= 18th Asian Film Awards =

2025 edition of award ceremony

- Teaser poster
- Awarded for: Excellence in Asian cinema
- Awarded by: Hong Kong International Film Festival; Busan International Film Festival; Tokyo International Film Festival
- Presented by: The Asian Film Awards Academy (AFAA)
- Announced on: Nominations: January 10, 2025
- Presented on: March 16, 2025
- Site: Xiqu Centre, West Kowloon Cultural District, Hong Kong
- Hosted by: Jason Chan; Sarah Song
- Official website: Asian Film Awards

Highlights
- Best Picture: All We Imagine as Light
- Best Actor: Sean Lau; Papa
- Best Actress: Shahana Goswami; Santosh
- Most awards: Exhuma; Santosh; Stranger Eyes; Twilight of the Warriors: Walled In (2)
- Most nominations: Exhuma (11)

Television coverage
- Network: YouTube; TVB Plus (Channel 82)

The 18th Asian Film Awards was held on March 16, 2025, at Xiqu Centre in the West Kowloon Cultural District, Hong Kong. The nominations were announced on January 10, 2025. The 18th edition featured a selection of 30 outstanding films from 25 countries and regions, competing across 16 awards. The South Korean film Exhuma with 11 nominations is the most-nominated film this year. Actors Dean Fujioka, Aokbab Chutimon, Austin Lin, Lo Chun-yip, and Masaki Okada were appointed, with Fujioka serving as the ambassador and the others as youth ambassadors.

The awards ceremony took place on March 16, 2025, at the Grand Theatre, with Jason Chan and Sarah Song as hosts. The event was broadcast live at 17:00 HKT on the YouTube channel of the Asian Film Awards Academy and TVB Plus (Channel 82). All We Imagine as Light by Payal Kapadia won the best film award.

== Events ==
The following events were held on March 14 and 15 leading to award ceremony:

- Stealing the Scene: The Best Supporting Actors Conversation
- Breaking Boundaries: The Next Wave of Asian Directors
- Tu Duu-chih’s Masterclass: Echoes of Light and Sound
- Bringing Stories to Life: The Art of Production Design
- Scoring the Screen: The Power of Film Music
- Pre-Awards gathering of ambassador Dean Fujioka and four youth ambassadors: Aokbab Chutimon, Austin Lin, Lo Chun-yip, and Masaki Okada. Win Metawin, a Thai star, also attended as they met fans at a special event in apm mall.
- Special screenings of three films nominated for Best Film and Best Director at the Awards:
  - All We Imagine as Light
  - Black Dog
  - Exhuma

== Jury ==
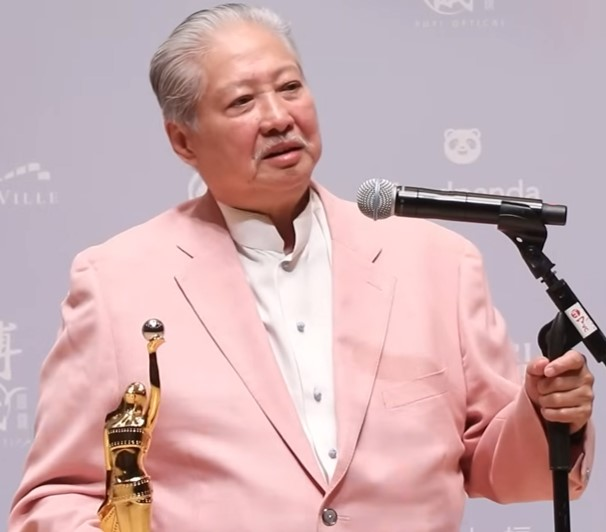
Sammo Hung, President of jury

- Sammo Hung as Jury President – Hong Kong actor, martial artist, film producer and director.
- (Italy) Sabrina Baracetti
- (United States) Roger Garcia
- (Japan) Ishizaka Kenji
- (Taiwan) Jennifer Jao
- (South Korea) Nam Dong-chul
- (China) Janet Wu Yanyan

== Winners and nominees ==
Complete list of nominees:

Winners are listed first and denoted in bold:

**Best Film**: **All We Imagine as Light (India / France / Netherlands / Luxembourg)**; Black Dog (China); Exhuma (South Korea); Teki Cometh (Japan); Twilight of the Warriors: Walled In (Hong Kong)	**Best Director**: (Japan) **Daihachi Yoshida – Teki Cometh**; (India) Payal Kapadia – All We Imagine as Light; (China) Guan Hu – Black Dog; (South Korea) Jang Jae-hyun – Exhuma; (Cambodia) Rithy Panh – Meeting with Pol Pot
**Best Actor**: (Hong Kong) **Sean Lau – Papa**; (Taiwan) Eddie Peng – Black Dog; (South Korea) Choi Min-sik – Exhuma; (Japan) Kyōzō Nagatsuka – Teki Cometh; (Hong Kong) Michael Hui – The Last Dance	**Best Actress**: (India) **Shahana Goswami – Santosh**; (India) Kani Kusruti – All We Imagine as Light; (Taiwan) Sylvia Chang – Daughter's Daughter; (Japan) Yuumi Kawai – Desert of Namibia; (South Korea) Kim Go-eun – Exhuma
**Best Supporting Actor**: (Taiwan) **Lee Kang-sheng – Stranger Eyes**; (Japan) Ken Mitsuishi – All the Long Nights; (Japan) Sosuke Ikematsu – My Sunshine; (Hong Kong) Chu Pak Hong – The Last Dance; (Hong Kong) / (United States) Philip Ng – Twilight of the Warriors: Walled In	**Best Supporting Actress**: (Taiwan) **Yang Kuei-mei – Yen and Ai-Lee**; (Hong Kong) Maggie Li Lin Lin – All Shall Be Well; (India) Divya Prabha – All We Imagine as Light; (South Korea) Lim Ji-yeon – Revolver; (Japan) Kumi Takiuchi – Teki Cometh
**Best New Director**: (India) / (United Kingdom) **Sandhya Suri – Santosh**; (Japan) Yoko Yamanaka – Desert of Namibia; (Japan) / (United States) Neo Sora – Happyend; (China) Dong Zijian – My Friend An Delie; (Vietnam) Minh Quý Trương – Viet and Nam	**Best Newcomer**: (Japan) **Hayato Kurihara – Happyend**; (South Korea) Lee Do-hyun – Exhuma; (Thailand) Putthipong Assaratanakul – How to Make Millions Before Grandma Dies; (Hong Kong) Dylan So – Papa; (Vietnam) Đào Duy Bảo Định – Viet and Nam
**Best Screenplay**: **The Seed of the Sacred Fig – Mohammad Rasoulof**; All the Long Nights – Kiyoto Wada and Sho Miyake; All We Imagine as Light – Payal Kapadia; Exhuma – Jang Jae-hyun; Meeting with Pol Pot – Rithy Panh and Pierre-Erwan Guillaume	**Best Editing**: **Twilight of the Warriors: Walled In – Cheung Ka-fai**; All We Imagine as Light – Clément Pinteaux; Meeting with Pol Pot – Rithy Panh and Matthieu Laclau; My Friend An Delie – William Chang Suk-ping; Papa – Jojo Shek
**Best Cinematography**: **Harbin – Hong Kyung-pyo**; My Friend An Delie – Lu Songye; Shambhala – Aziz Zhambakiyiv; Teki Cometh – Hidetoshi Shinomiya; Twilight of the Warriors: Walled In – Cheng Siu-keung	**Best Original Music**: **The Last Dance – Chu Wan Pin**; All the Long Nights – Hi'Spec; The Box Man – Michiaki Katsumoto; Exhuma – Kim Tae-seong; Twilight of the Warriors: Walled In – Kenji Kawai
**Best Costume Design**: **Exhuma – Choi Yoon-sun**; A Tapestry of a Legendary Land – Yang Donglin; Shambhala – Dorjee Dradhul Gurung; Teki Cometh – Miyamoto Mari; Twilight of the Warriors: Walled In – Bruce Yu, Karen Yip	**Best Production Design**: **Twilight of the Warriors: Walled In – Kenneth Mak, Chau Sai Hung Ambrose**; Black Dog – Huo Tingxiao, Li Chang; Don't Cry, Butterfly – Pham Phong Lan; Exhuma – Seo Seong-gyeong; The Box Man – Hayashida Yuji
**Best Visual Effects**: **Exhuma – Kim Shin-chul, Daniel Son**; Black Dog – Danny Yin; Black Ox – Sato Fumiro, Kobari Yasuhiro; Dead Talents Society – Tomi Kuo, Chiu Chun-Yi; Twilight of the Warriors: Walled In – Lin Chun Yue Jules, Ma Siu Fu, Garrett K Lam, Yee Kwok Leung	**Best Sound**: **Stranger Eyes – Tu Duu-chih, Tu Tse-Kang**; Cadet – Zurab Kurmanbayev; Exhuma – Kim Byung-in; Twilight of the Warriors: Walled In – Yiu Chun Hin, Cheung Man Hoi, To Burnard Davy; Viet and Nam – Vincent Villa
**Lifetime Achievement Award**: **Koji Yakusho**	**Excellence in Asian Cinema Award**: **Tang Wei**; **Jang Dong-gun**
**Next Generation Award**: **Wu Kang-ren**	**Rising Star of Asia Award**: **Kōki**

=== Films with multiple nominations ===
Films with multiple nominations
Nominations	Film
11	Exhuma
9	Twilight of the Warriors: Walled In
6	All We Imagine as Light
6	Teki Cometh
5	Black Dog
3	All the Long Nights
3	The Last Dance
3	Meeting with Pol Pot
3	My Friend An Delie
3	Papa
3	Viet and Nam
2	The Box Man
2	Desert of Namibia
2	Santosh
2	Shambhala
2	Stranger Eyes
