= Asian Film Award for Best New Director =

Asian Film Awards

- Awarded for: Best New Director of the Year in Asian Cinema
- Presented by: Asian Film Awards Academy
- First award: 2018
- Most recent winner: Sandhya Suri; Santosh (2025)
- Website: afa-academy.com

The Asian Film Award for Best New Director has been presented annually since 2018 by the Asian Film Awards Academy (AFAA), a non-profit organization founded by Busan International Film Festival, Hong Kong International Film Festival and Tokyo International Film Festival with the shared goal of celebrating excellence in Asian cinema.

== Winners and nominees ==
=== 2010s ===
Year	Recipient(s)	English title	Original title	Ref.
2018	(China) Dong Yue	The Looming Storm	暴雪将至	
2018	(China) Vivian Qu	Angels Wear White	嘉年华	
2018	(Taiwan) Huang Hsin-yao	The Great Buddha+	大佛普拉斯	
2018	(Thailand) Anucha Boonyawatana	Malila: The Farewell Flower	มะลิลา	
2018	(Japan) Yoshiyuki Kishi	Wilderness	あゝ、荒野	
2018	(Hong Kong) Derek Hui	This Is Not What I Expected	喜欢你	
2019	(Hong Kong) Oliver Chan	Still Human	淪落人	
2019	(Singapore) Yeo Siew Hua	A Land Imagined	幻土	
2019	(India) Rima Das	Bulbul Can Sing	बुलबुल गा सकती है	
2019	(Thailand) Phuttiphong Aroonpheng	Manta Ray	กระเบนราหู	
2019	(Japan) Shinichirou Ueda	One Cut of the Dead	カメラを止めるな!	
2019	(China) Bai Xue	The Crossing	过春天	

=== 2020s ===
Year	Recipient(s)	English title	Original title	Ref.
2020	(Japan) Hikari	37 Seconds		
2020	(Taiwan) John Hsu	Detention	返校	
2020	(China) Liang Ming	Wisdom Tooth	日光之下	
2020	(South Korea) Lee Sang-geun	Exit	엑시트	
2020	(Hong Kong) Norris Wong	My Prince Edward	金都	
2020	(Kazakhstan) Sharipa Urazbayeva	Mariam		
2021	(South Korea) Hong Eui-jeong	Voice of Silence	소리도 없이	
2021	(Japan) Yūjirō Harumoto	A Balance	由宇子の天秤	
2021	(India) PS Vinothraj	Pebbles	Koozhangal	
2021	(China) Yin Ruoxi	Sisters	我的姐姐	
2021	(China) Han Shuai	Summer Blur	汉南夏日	
2021	(Iran) Ahmad Bahrami	The Wasteland	خامو شدشت	
2023	(China) Jigme Trinley	One and Four	一个和四个	
2023	(Pakistan) Saim Sadiq	Joyland	جوائے لینڈ	
2023	(Indonesia) Makbul Mubarak	Autobiography		
2023	(Japan) Chie Hayakawa	Plan 75		
2023	(South Korea) Kim Se-in	The Apartment with Two Women	같은 속옷을 입는 두 여자	
2024	(Hong Kong) Nick Cheuk	Time Still Turns the Pages	年少日記	
2024	(Malaysia) Amanda Nell Eu	Tiger Stripes		
2024	(Vietnam) Phạm Thiên Ân	Inside the Yellow Cocoon Shell	Bên trong vỏ kén vàng	
2024	(Mongolia) Lkhagvadulam Purev-Ochir	City of Wind	Сэр сэр салхи	
2024	(India) Dominic Sangma	Rapture		
2025	(India) / (United Kingdom) Sandhya Suri	Santosh		
2025	(Japan) / (United States) Neo Sora	Happyend		
2025	(Japan) Yoko Yamanaka	Desert of Namibia	ナミビアの砂漠	
2025	(Vietnam) Minh Quý Trương	Viet and Nam	Trong lòng đất	
2025	(China) Dong Zijian	My Friend An Delie	我的朋友安德烈	

== See also ==
- Blue Dragon Film Award for Best New Director
- Caméra d'Or
- César Award for Best First Film
- European Film Award for European Discovery of the Year
- Golden Horse Award for Best New Director
- Hong Kong Film Award for Best New Director
