= Asian Film Award for Best Screenplay =

Asian Film Awards

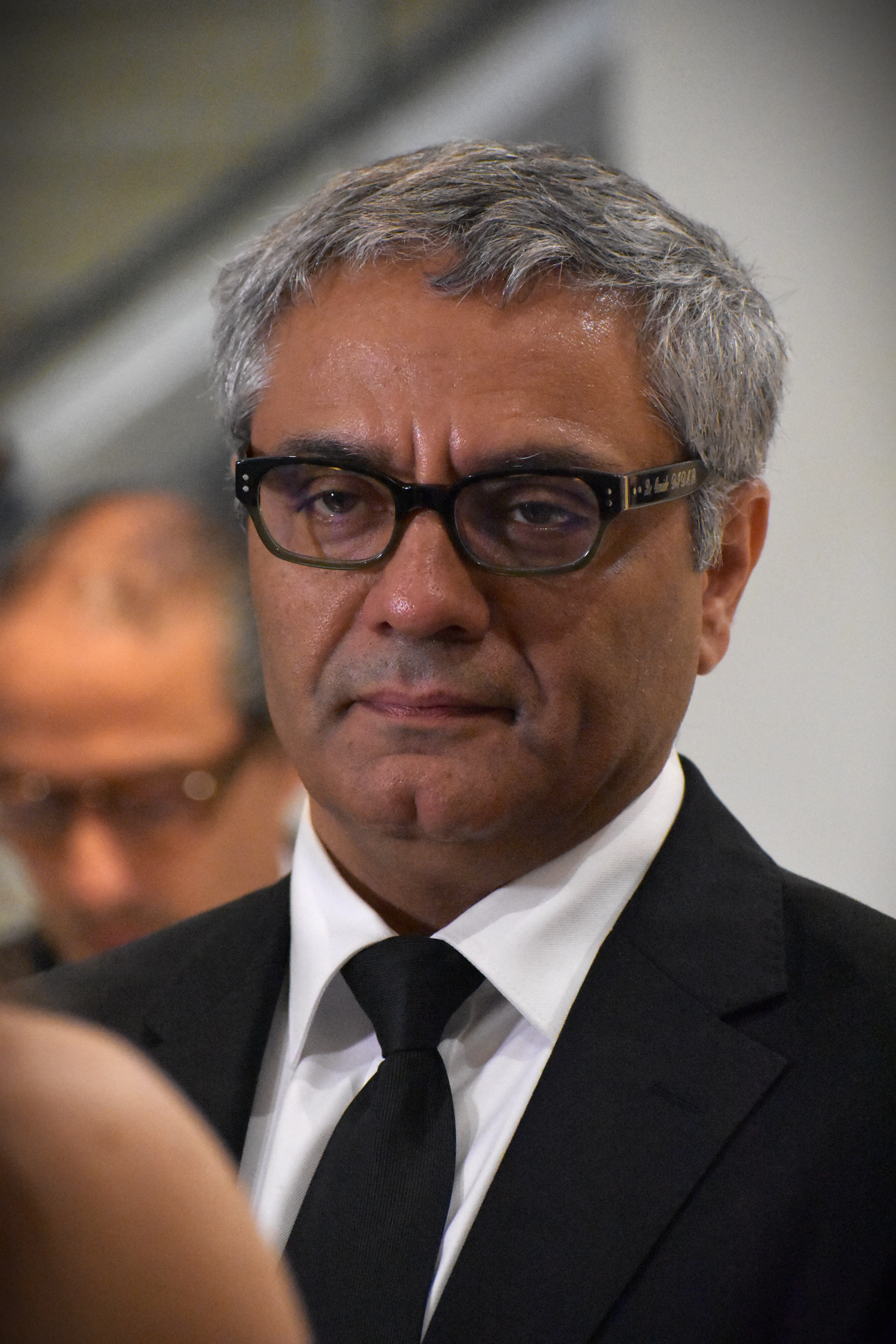
- The 2025 recipient: Mohammad Rasoulof
- Awarded for: Achievement in Screenwriting
- Presented by: Asian Film Awards Academy
- First award: 2007
- Currently held by: Mohammad Rasoulof; The Seed of the Sacred Fig (2025)
- Website: afa-academy.com

The Asian Film Award for Best Screenplay is presented annually by the Asian Film Awards Academy (AFAA), a non-profit organization founded by Busan International Film Festival, Hong Kong International Film Festival and Tokyo International Film Festival with the shared goal of celebrating excellence in Asian cinema. It was first presented in 2007. The category includes both original and adapted screenplays.

== Winners and nominees ==
=== 2000s ===
Year	English title	Original title	Recipient(s)	Ref.
2007	Men at Work	کارگران مشغول کارند	Mani Haghighi	
2007	Woman on the Beach	해변의 여인	Hong Sang-soo	
2007	Death Note 2: The Last Name	デスノート the Last name	Oishi Tetsuya, Shusuke Kaneko	
2007	Crazy Stone	疯狂的石头	Zhang Cheng, Yue Xiaojun, Ning Hao	
2007	My Scary Girl	달콤, 살벌한 연인	Sohn Jae-gon	
2007	Invisible Waves	คำพิพากษาของมหาสมุทร	Prabda Yoon	
2008	Mad Detective	神探	Au Kin-yee, Wai Ka-fai	
2008	I Just Didn't Do It	それでもボクはやってない	Masayuki Suo	
2008	Lust, Caution	色，戒	Wang Hui-ling, James Schamus	
2008	Little Moth	血蝉	Peng Tao	
2008	The Old Garden	오래된 정원	Im Sang-soo	
2009	Tokyo Sonata	トウキョウソナタ	Kiyoshi Kurosawa, Max Mannix, Tanaka Sachiko	
2009	The Magic Hour	ザ・マジックアワー	Kōki Mitani	
2009	The Chaser	추격자	Na Hong-jin	
2009	And the Spring Comes	立春	Li Qiang	
2009	Winds of September	九降風	Tom Lin Shu-yu, Henry Tsai Tsung-Han	

=== 2010s ===
Year	English title	Original title	Recipient(s)	Ref.
2010	Mother	마더	Park Eun-kyo, Bong Joon Ho	
2010	Like You Know It All	잘 알지도 못하면서	Hong Sang-soo	
2010	About Elly	درباره الی	Asghar Farhadi	
2010	Adrift	Chơi vơi	Phan Đăng Di	
2010	Written By	再生號	Wai Ka-fai, Au Kin-yee	
2011	Poetry	시	Lee Chang-dong	
2011	The Unjust	부당거래	Park Hoon-jung	
2011	Reign of Assassins	劍雨	Su Chao-Pin	
2011	Let the Bullets Fly	让子弹飞	Zhu Sujin, Shu Ping, Jiang Wen, Guo Junli, Wei Xiao, Li Bukong	
2011	Love in a Puff	志明與春嬌	Pang Ho-cheung, Heiward Mak	
2012	A Separation	جدایی نادر از سیمین	Asghar Farhadi	
2012	Postcard	一枚のハガキ	Kaneto Shindo	
2012	Overheard 2	竊聽風雲2	Alan Mak, Felix Chong	
2012	The Flowers of War	金陵十三钗	Liu Heng, Geling Yan	
2012	The Woman in the Septic Tank	Ang babae sa septic tank	Chris Martinez	
2013	Mystery	浮城谜事	Mei Feng, Yu Fan, Lou Ye	
2013	The Kirishima Thing	桐島、部活やめるってよ	Kōhei Kiyasu, Daihachi Yoshida	
2013	Nameless Gangster: Rules of the Time	범죄와의 전쟁: 나쁜놈들 전성시대	Yoon Jong-bin	
2013	Drug War	毒戰	Wai Ka-fai, Yau Nai-hoi, Ryker Chan, Yu Xi	
2013	Ship of Theseus		Anand Gandhi	
2014	The Lunchbox		Ritesh Batra	
2014	Snowpiercer		Bong Joon Ho, Kelly Masterson	
2014	The Grandmaster	一代宗师	Wong Kar-wai, Zou Jingzhi, Xu Haofeng	
2014	So Young	致我们终将逝去的青春	Li Qiang	
2014	The Great Passage	舟を編む	Watanabe Kensaku	
2015	Black Coal, Thin Ice	白日焰火	Diao Yinan	
2015	A Hard Day	끝까지 간다	Kim Seong-hun	
2015	The Light Shines Only There	そこのみにて光輝く	Takada Ryô	
2015	The Golden Era	黄金时代	Li Qiang	
2015	Court		Chaitanya Tamhane	
2016	Mountains May Depart	山河故人	Jia Zhangke	
2016	Journey to the Shore	岸辺の旅	Ujita Takashi, Kiyoshi Kurosawa	
2016	Veteran	베테랑	Ryoo Seung-wan	
2016	Port of Call	踏血尋梅	Philip Yung	
2016	Talvar		Vishal Bhardwaj	
2017	The Salesman	فروشنده	Asghar Farhadi	
2017	The Handmaiden	아가씨	Park Chan-wook, Chung Seo-kyung	
2017	Your Name	君の名は。	Makoto Shinkai	
2017	The Woman Who Left	Ang Babaeng Humayo	Lav Diaz	
2017	Trivisa	樹大招風	Mak Tin Shu, Loong Man Hong, Thomas Ng	
2018	Newton		Mayank Tewari, Amit V. Masurkar	
2018	Love Education	相愛相親	Sylvia Chang, You Xiaoying	
2018	Youth	芳华	Geling Yan	
2018	Anarchist from Colony	박열	Hwang Seong-gu	
2018	Bad Genius	ฉลาดเกมส์โกง	Tanida Hantaweewatana, Vasudhorn Piyaromna, Nattawut Poonpiriya	
2019	Ash Is Purest White	江湖儿女	Jia Zhangke	
2019	Burning	버닝	Lee Chang-dong, Oh Jung-mi	
2019	Sanju		Rajkumar Hirani, Abhijat Joshi	
2019	Dying to Survive	我不是药神	Wen Muye, Zhong Wei, Han Jianü	
2019	Project Gutenberg	無雙	Felix Chong	

=== 2020s ===
Year	English title	Original title	Recipient(s)	Ref.
2020	Parasite	기생충	Bong Joon-ho, Han Jin-won	
2020	Balloon	气球	Pema Tseden	
2020	A Sun	陽光普照	Chang Yao-sheng, Chung Mong-hong	
2020	So Long, My Son	地久天长	A Mei, Wang Xiaoshuai	
2020	Castle of Dreams	قصر شیرین	Mohammad Davoudi, Mohsen Gharaei	
2021	The Disciple		Chaitanya Tamhane	
2021	Voice of Silence	소리도 없이	Hong Eui-jeong	
2021	My Missing Valentine	消失的情人節	Chen Yu-hsun	
2021	Sister	我的姐姐	You Xiaoying	
2023	Decision to Leave	헤어질 결심	Jeong Seo-kyeong, Park Chan-wook	
2023	Drive My Car	ドライブ・マイ・カー	Ryusuke Hamaguchi, Takamasa Oe	
2023	When the Waves Are Gone	Kapag Wala Nang Mga Alon	Lav Diaz	
2023	Lighting Up the Stars	人生大事	Liu Jiangjiang, Yu Min	
2023	Autobiography		Makbul Mubarak	
2024	Snow Leopard	雪豹	Pema Tseden	
2024	Evil Does Not Exist	悪は存在しない	Ryusuke Hamaguchi	
2024	Monster	怪物	Yuji Sakamoto	
2024	Sleep	잠	Jason Yu	
2024	Paradise		Prasanna Vithanage, Anushka Senanayake	
2025	The Seed of the Sacred Fig	دانه‌ی انجیر معابد	Mohammad Rasoulof	
2025	All We Imagine as Light		Payal Kapadia	
2025	Exhuma	파묘	Jang Jae-hyun	
2025	All the Long Nights	夜明けのすべて	Wada Kiyoto, Miyake Sho	
2025	Meeting with Pol Pot	Rendez-vous avec Pol Pot	Pierre Erwan Guillaume, Rithy Panh	

== See also ==
- Blue Dragon Film Award for Best Screenplay
- Cannes Film Festival Award for Best Screenplay
- European Film Award for Best Screenwriter
- Hong Kong Film Award for Best Screenplay
- Japan Academy Film Prize for Screenplay of the Year
- Venice Film Festival Award for Best Screenplay
