= Santosh (2024 film) =

2024 Hindi film by Sandhya Suri

- Indian theatrical release poster with original release date
- Directed by: Sandhya Suri
- Written by: Sandhya Suri
- Produced by: Mike Goodridge; James Bowsher; Balthazar de Ganay; Alan McAlex
- Starring: Shahana Goswami; Sunita Rajwar; Sanjay Bishnoi
- Cinematography: Lennert Hillege
- Edited by: Maxime Pozzi-Garcia
- Music by: Luisa Gerstein
- Production companies: BFI; BBC Film; mk2 Films; Good Chaos; Haut et Court; Razor Film; ZDF; Arte; Suitable Pictures
- Distributed by: Civic Studios; Vertigo Releasing (United Kingdom and Ireland); PVR Inox Pictures (India); Haut et Court (France)
- Release dates: 20 May 2024 (Cannes); 17 July 2024 (France); 21 March 2025 (United Kingdom)
- Running time: 120 minutes
- Countries: United Kingdom; India; Germany; France
- Language: Hindi
- Budget: $2.5 million
- Box office: $1.3 million

Santosh is a 2024 Hindi-language police procedural crime drama film written and directed by Sandhya Suri. It is an international co-production of the United Kingdom, India, Germany, and France. Set in rural north India, it stars Shahana Goswami as a widow who inherits her late husband's job of police constable and is involved in the investigation of the murder and rape of a Dalit teenager.

The film was intended to be a documentary on sexual abuse in India, but the director decided to create a fiction film after seeing an image of female demonstrators and a female constable in a protest on the 2012 Delhi gang rape and murder. Filming lasted from August to October 2023 in Lucknow, India. The film had its world premiere in the Un Certain Regard section of the 77th Cannes Film Festival on 20 May 2024. It was planned for a release in India in January 2025, but was indefinitely delayed as requests for film cuts were not done.

Santosh received positive reception for its cinematography and approach in discussing its themes on corruption and was selected as the UK's entry for Best International Feature Film at the 97th Academy Awards and made it in the December shortlist.

== Plot ==
Santosh Saini, the wife of an Indian constable who was killed during a riot, inherits her spouse's position as a constable through a government scheme called "compassionate recruitment" and is appointed to a rural town. During her duty, she overhears a Dalit man speaking about the disappearance of his 15-year-old daughter, Devika Pippal, two days earlier, after the police had previously ignored his report. They attempt to file another complaint at the police station but are mockingly disregarded.

The following day, she comes across a protest outside the police station. She sees Devika's corpse among the crowd; Devika had been raped, murdered, and dumped in a well in a Dalit village. Devika's parents, standing beside her body, demand justice from the police and declare that they will not leave unless the perpetrator is punished. Santosh and other female constables are ordered to drag the protesters away. The death and subsequent protests receive widespread media attention.

Santosh, Inspector Geeta Sharma, and other police officers arrive in the Dalit village to investigate the death. Santosh learns from Devika's parents that Devika was last seen at dawn when she went to fetch water. She finds Devika's mobile phone and reads her text messages with Saleem, who had mentioned that he was going to Mumbai, and reports her findings to Geeta that evening. Santosh visits the village chief's (Note: The village chief is referred to as Pradhan.) house, where Saleem and his father work on the chief's farm, and learns that they left several days earlier. Afterwards, she pressures one of Saleem's friends into providing information about him and learns the name of the city where he is staying. Santosh and Geeta arrest Saleem at a hotel in the city.

They report to the police commissioner's house, where the commissioner suggests that they keep Saleem near his home after a politician, Beniwal, visits him. The day after Saleem's arrest, the police beat him during interrogations at an abandoned house. Saleem admits that he knew Devika, liked her, and had obtained her mobile phone number. Unsatisfied with his answers, the officers torture and waterboard him during the interrogations. Santosh is handed a paddle and, under pressure, repeatedly beats Saleem before suffering a panic attack.

Unable to sleep afterwards, Santosh reflects on Saleem's possible death and questions whether he is innocent. Geeta responds that his innocence would not help advance the case. Santosh discreetly checks Saleem's smartphone and discovers that he was in Mumbai on the day of Devika's death, implying that he could not have murdered her. In the following days, Santosh and the police team report that Saleem died by suicide through hanging. However, Geeta privately warns Santosh that autopsy reports will eventually reveal Santosh's responsibility for Saleem's death.

Santosh visits the village chief's house and learns that Devika had gone to fetch water from the chief's well because a cat's corpse had contaminated the well in the Dalit village. While Santosh is there, Beniwal, the chief's brother-in-law, arrives. Santosh asks Beniwal whether he was aware of Devika entering the property. However, Beniwal avoids the question, and one of his friends remarks that Dalits are not allowed to fetch water from the chief's well before casually mentioning a recent party they attended. When Santosh confronts Beniwal about whether he was responsible for Devika's murder, he responds by asking what she would do if he were guilty.

Santosh meets Geeta at a restaurant and confronts her over the fact that she knew Saleem was innocent. Geeta responds that Saleem's death has brought justice and served as a warning to those who would commit rape, and that finding the real culprit would not benefit Devika's family or village. Geeta shows Santosh her suspension letter. After visiting the Pippal house, Santosh leaves her uniform in her quarters and boards an intercity train.

== Cast ==
- Shahana Goswami as Santosh Saini
- Sunita Rajwar as Geeta Sharma
- Sanjay Bishnoi as Beniwal

== Production ==
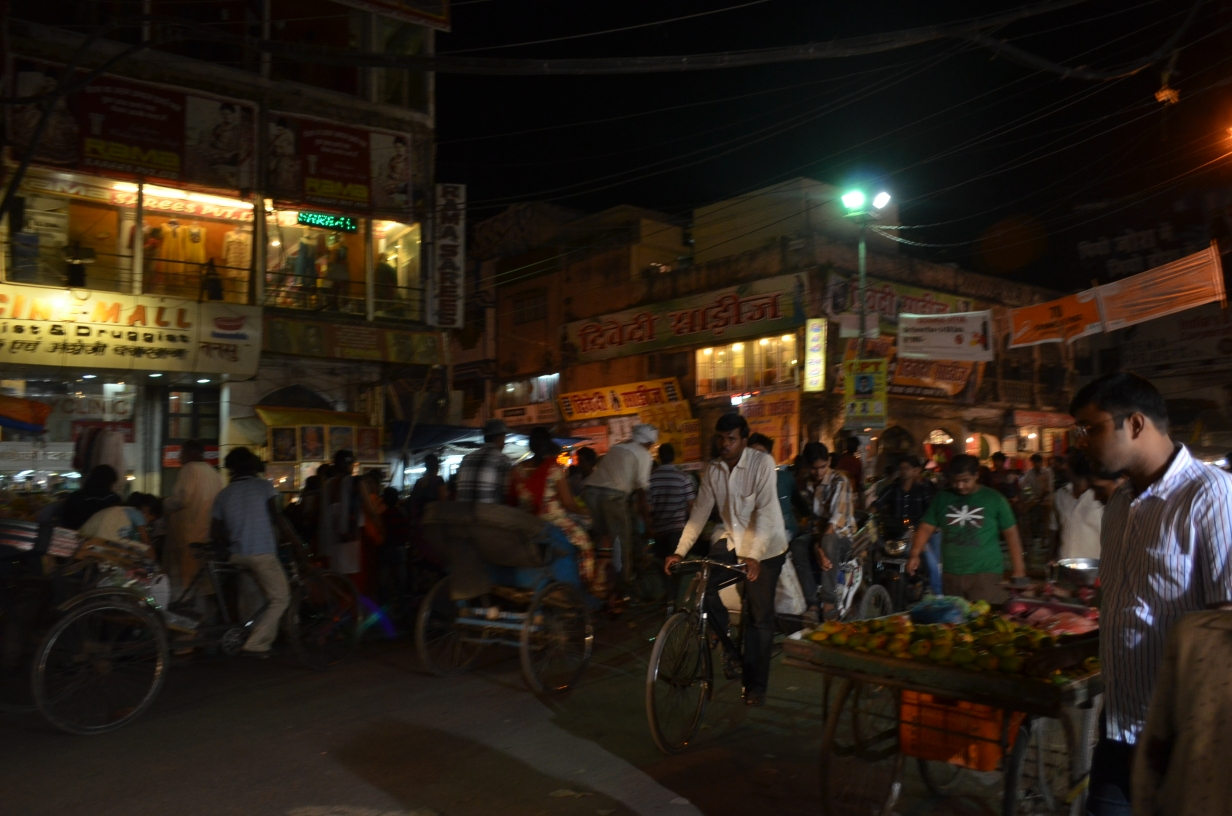
A market in Lucknow, the city where filming took place

The film was directed by British-Indian film director Sandhya Suri. Suri, who had worked with nongovernmental organizations in northern India, wanted to create a documentary on the context of sexual abuse against women in India as a follow-up to the 2005 documentary I for India. She eventually dropped the project as she struggled to translate her research "as a documentary form because it was just too horrific". However, she decided to use fiction after she saw an image of female demonstrators "almost spitting with hatred" in front of a female constable during a protest on the 2012 Delhi gang rape and murder. Suri decided to create a fiction film to narrate "what is it like to be her [the female constable] in uniform and out of uniform". She then discovered that an eligible person can inherit the job of a deceased immediate family member who died while in government service, which became a key part of the film's narrative. Suri consulted with police anthropologists for the script.

Principal photography occurred over 45 days from August to October 2023 in and around Lucknow, India. The cast is composed of both professional and nonprofessional actors. One person from the production's catering team was selected as an actor. The person who would portray the mother of the deceased girl was an observer who asked what was going on while the film crew prepared the film location at a police station. Real locations were used for the film; a scene shot in a hotel included people who were living there rather than hired extras for authenticity. The producers sent requests to Delhi's chief controller of railways to film a scene on a train at the national railway. Mumbai-based producer Suitable Producers assisted producers based in the United Kingdom in navigating shooting locations in India.

British film producer James Bowsher decided that the setting would be an unnamed city in India for its portrayal of local police. Producers decided not to apply for the Uttar Pradesh Film Subsidy to avoid filming stipulations from local authorities. While editing the film, producers debated whether to include a score to add tension in several scenes. Director Suri did not add a score.

== Release ==
The film premiered at the 77th Cannes Film Festival in May 2024. It was also selected for the MAMI Mumbai Film Festival 2024, where it was part of the South Asia Competition section. In December 2024, PVR Inox Pictures acquired Indian distribution rights to the film from mk2 Films, scheduling it for a theatrical release on 10 January 2025. However, the film's Indian release was indefinitely delayed after failing to obtain certification clearance from the Central Board of Film Certification (CBFC). In March 2025, censors from the CBFC blocked the film's release outright, supposedly over concerns of its depictions of Islamophobia, casteism, misogyny and police brutality, and demanded that cuts be made to the film. The production team found the ban unexpected since the script received approval from Indian authorities for shooting for filming without issues. The director called the ban on the film in India surprising as the issues raised in the film were not "particularly new to Indian cinema or hadn’t been raised before by other films". The film was then pivoted to a streaming release in India on Lionsgate Play on 17 October 2025 instead, only for that release to be halted at the last minute as well.

== Reception ==
=== Critical response ===
On the review aggregator website Rotten Tomatoes, 100% of 59 critics' reviews are positive, with an average rating of 7.6/10. The website's consensus reads: "Shahana Goswami bristles with unforgettable intensity in Santosh, a nervy procedural that asks the hard questions about a culture's social hierarchy." Metacritic, which uses a weighted average, assigned the film a score of 75 out of 100, based on 16 critics, indicating "generally favorable" reviews.

Santosh received provided positive reception from several reviewers for its casting, especially on the effectiveness of Rajwar and Goswami in depicting a mentor-mentee relationship and the casting of non-actors, which added authenticity to the film. The film's cinematography, which has been described as claustrophobic through its use of shadows similar to procedurals by a reviewer, was also discussed. For instance, Variety's Siddhant Adlakha noticed consistent silent reaction shots of Santosh throughout the film. Adlakha found these camera shots "an occasionally distancing experience", but added that these force viewers to infer the film's theme. The film's cinematography, by placing characters into "static frames" such as cramped police stations, houses, and alleyways, reflects the subtle compromises characters undergo in the film for The Hindu's Ayaan Paul Chowdhury.

A reviewer from the Financial Times described Santosh as a documentary-like analysis, while a Film Quarterly report called the film a "moral tale in the form of a noir". The film provides commentary through "offhand remarks and casual cruelties" rather than exposition. Adlankha described Suri's writing as "intellectually stimulating rather than emotionally engaging"; the film's ambiguity about Devika's murder causes its lack of dramatic suspense. The film presents issues of "police cliques [...] at the cost of human drama" in several instances, for Robert Abele of the Los Angeles Times. However, the ending was a "faint hesitation" in the film's analysis of corruption, Chowdhury notes. They argue that after a thorough analysis of corruption in the Indian police, Santosh "suddenly feels compelled to tidy things" and move away.

=== Accolades ===
Award	Date of ceremony	Category	Recipient(s)	Result	Ref.
Cannes Film Festival	25 May 2024	Prix Un Certain Regard	Sandhya Suri	Nominated	
BFI London Film Festival	20 October 2024	Sutherland Award for Best First Feature	Santosh	Nominated	
Seville European Film Festival	16 November 2024	Best Screenplay Award	Sandhya Suri	Won	
Camerimage	23 November 2024	Golden Frog – Directors' Debuts Competition	Sandhya Suri	Won	
Tokyo Filmex	30 November 2024	Special Jury Award	Santosh	Won	
Tokyo Filmex	30 November 2024	Student Jury Prize	Santosh	Won	
National Board of Review	4 December 2024	Top Five International Films	Santosh	Won (Note: This award does not have a single winner, but recognizes multiple films.)	
European Film Awards	7 December 2024	European Discovery – Prix FIPRESCI	Santosh	Nominated	
British Independent Film Awards	8 December 2024	Best British Independent Film	Sandhya Suri, Mike Goodridge, James Bowsher, Balthazar de Ganay and Alan McAlex	Nominated	
British Independent Film Awards	8 December 2024	Best Screenplay	Sandhya Suri	Won	
British Independent Film Awards	8 December 2024	Best Debut Screenwriter	Sandhya Suri	Nominated	
British Independent Film Awards	8 December 2024	Breakthrough Producer	Balthazar De Ganay, James Bowsher	Won	
Asian Film Awards	16 March 2025	Best Actress	Shahana Goswami	Won	
Asian Film Awards	16 March 2025	Best New Director	Sandhya Suri	Won	
British Academy Film Awards	16 February 2025	Outstanding Debut by a British Writer, Director or Producer	Sandhya Suri, James Bowsher, Balthazar de Ganay (also produced by Mike Goodridge and Alan McAlex)	Nominated	
97th Academy Awards	2 March 2025	Best International Feature Film	Santosh	Shortlisted	

== See also ==
- List of submissions to the 97th Academy Awards for Best International Feature Film
- List of British submissions for the Academy Award for Best International Feature Film
