= Inside the Yellow Cocoon Shell =

2023 film by Phạm Thiên Ân

- Vietnamese: Bên trong vỏ kén vàng
- Directed by: Phạm Thiên Ân
- Written by: Phạm Thiên Ân
- Produced by: Trần Văn Thi; Jeremy Chua
- Starring: Lê Phong Vũ; Nguyễn Thị Trúc Quỳnh; Nguyễn Thịnh; Vũ Ngọc Mạnh
- Cinematography: Đinh Duy Hưng
- Edited by: Phạm Thiên Ân
- Production companies: JK Film; Potocol; Deuxième Ligne Films; Zorba Production; Fasten Films
- Distributed by: CJ CGV
- Release dates: 24 May 2023 (Cannes); 11 August 2023 (Vietnam); 20 September 2023 (France)
- Running time: 179 minutes
- Countries: Vietnam; Singapore; France; Spain
- Language: Vietnamese
- Box office: US$352,927

Inside the Yellow Cocoon Shell (Vietnamese: Bên trong vỏ kén vàng) is a 2023 Vietnamese-language drama film written and directed by Phạm Thiên Ân, in his feature directorial debut. It is a co-production between Vietnam, Singapore, France and Spain.

It had its world premiere in the Directors' Fortnight section at the 76th Cannes Film Festival on 24 May 2023, and won the Caméra d'Or, which is awarded for the best first feature film. The film was released in Vietnam on 11 August 2023.

== Plot ==
Thien's sister-in-law Hanh dies in a motorcycle accident in Saigon, although her five-year-old son Dao survives the crash. Thien takes both Dao and his sister-in-law's body to the rural village where he grew up. There, he sees life in the countryside in a series of loosely connected events. A funeral and other Catholic ceremonies are conducted. Thien meets an old man who fought in the Vietnam War, who tells his stories of surviving when so many did not. He goes out hunting with his host and bonds with Dao, and awkwardly reconnects with Thao, a childhood friend he had attempted to form a romantic relationship with when younger, but who has since become a nun. He arranges for Dao to be taken to the school where she works, where most of the students are highlanders.

Thien leaves the village rather than stick around for an event, and begins aimlessly searching for his missing brother Tam, perhaps to learn of his fate, and tell him that the wife he abandoned was dead and his son needed to be cared for. He also learns that his brother had briefly gone to seminary and had considered becoming a priest, before deciding to marry instead. He shows a wedding picture of the two found on Hanh's body in a village he thinks might be connected, and talks with people there, but the search is ultimately fruitless.

== Cast ==
- Lê Phong Vũ as Thiện
- Nguyễn Thịnh as Đạo
- Nguyễn Thị Trúc Quỳnh as Thảo
- Vũ Ngọc Mạnh as Trung

== Production ==
The film was produced by Van Thi Tran for JK Film (Vietnam) and Jeremy Chua for Potocol (Singapore), in coproduction with Deuxième Ligne Films (France), Zorba Production (Vietnam) and Fasten Films (Spain).

Pham Thien An's 2019 Cannes short film entry, Stay Awake, Be Ready, which won the Illy Short Film Award in the Directors' Fortnight section, inspired Inside the Yellow Cocoon Shell.

On RFI Vietnamese radio, the "cocoon shell" is said by director Pham Thien An to be a metaphor or symbol for people trapped chasing after fame or fortune and to escape the "shell" requires some soul-searching revolving around the question of 'What to live for'.

== Release ==
The film was selected to be screened in the Directors' Fortnight section of the 76th Cannes Film Festival, where it had its world premiere on 24 May 2023. It was also invited at the 28th Busan International Film Festival in 'A Window on Asian Cinema' section and screened there in October 2023.

World sales are handled by Cercamon. The film was theatrically released in Vietnam by CJ CGV on 11 August 2023. Nour Films distributed the film in France on 20 September 2023, under the title L'Arbre aux papillons d'or. The film was given a limited release in the US by Kino Lorber starting on 19 January 2024.

== Reception ==
=== Critical response ===
On the review aggregator website Rotten Tomatoes, the film holds an approval rating of 94% based on 54 reviews, with an average rating of 8.2/10. The site's critics consensus reads, "Following its own alluringly inscrutable path between past, present, reality, and dreams, Inside the Yellow Cocoon Shell rewards patient viewers with an absorbing spiritual odyssey." Metacritic, which uses a weighted average, assigned the film a score of 94 out of 100, based on 15 critics, indicating "universal acclaim". On AlloCiné, the film received an average rating of 3.9 out of 5 stars, based on 26 reviews from French critics.

Guy Lodge of Variety called it "challenging but seductive art cinema that invites comparisons to such titans as Apichatpong Weerasethakul, Tsai Ming-liang and even Theo Angelopoulos, without feeling derivative of any." Peter Bradshaw of The Guardian awarded the movie five stars out of five, describing it as a "jewel of slow cinema (that) is a wondrous meditation on faith and death."

=== Accolades ===
Award	Date of ceremony	Category	Recipient(s)	Result	Ref.
Asia Pacific Screen Awards	3 November 2023	Young Cinema Award	Phạm Thiên Ân	Won	
Asian Film Awards	10 March 2024	Best New Director	Phạm Thiên Ân	Nominated	
Asian Film Awards	10 March 2024	Best Sound	Vương Gia Bảo, Toh Xander	Nominated	
Da Nang Asian Film Festival	6 July 2024	Best Film - Asian In-competition Films	Inside the Yellow Cocoon Shell	Nominated	
Da Nang Asian Film Festival	6 July 2024	Best Director - Asian In-competition Films	Phạm Thiên Ân	Won	
Da Nang Asian Film Festival	6 July 2024	Best Lead Actor - Asian In-competition Films	Lê Phong Vũ	Nominated	
Cannes Film Festival	27 May 2023	Caméra d'Or	Phạm Thiên Ân	Won	
Festival du Nouveau Cinéma de Montreal	15 October 2023	Louve d'Or	Phạm Thiên Ân	Nominated	
Gotham Awards	2 December 2024	Best International Feature	Thien An Pham, Jeremy Chua, Tran Van Thi	Nominated	
International Cinephile Society	11 February 2024	Best Picture	Inside the Yellow Cocoon Shell	Nominated	
International Cinephile Society	11 February 2024	Best Cinematography	Đinh Duy Hưng	Runner-up	
International Cinephile Society	11 February 2024	Best Debut Film	Phạm Thiên Ân	Runner-up	
Independent Spirit Awards	22 February 2025	Someone to Watch Award	Phạm Thiên Ân	Nominated	
Independent Spirit Awards	22 February 2025	Best Cinematography	Đinh Duy Hưng	Nominated	
Jerusalem Film Festival	23 July 2023	The Nechama Rivilin Award for Best International Film	Phạm Thiên Ân	Nominated	
Melbourne International Film Festival	19 August 2023	Bright Horizons Award	Phạm Thiên Ân	Nominated	
Montclair Film Festival	29 October 2023	Fiction Feature	Phạm Thiên Ân	Nominated	
Pingyao International Film Festival	16 October 2023	Roberto Rossellini Best Film Award	Phạm Thiên Ân	Won	
San Sebastián International Film Festival	30 September 2023	Zabaltegi-Tabakalera Prize	Phạm Thiên Ân	Nominated	
Singapore International Film Festival	10 December 2023	Silver Screen Award for Best Asian Feature Film	Phạm Thiên Ân	Won	
Tokyo FILMeX	26 November 2023	Grand Prize	Phạm Thiên Ân	Won	
