= Black Dog (2024 film) =

2024 film directed by Guan Hu

- Official film poster
- Traditional Chinese: 狗陣
- Simplified Chinese: 狗阵
- Hanyu Pinyin: Gǒu Zhèn
- Directed by: Guan Hu
- Written by: Guan Hu; Ge Rui; Wu Bing
- Produced by: Zhu Wenjiu
- Starring: Eddie Peng; Tong Liya
- Cinematography: Gao Weizhe
- Edited by: Matthieu Laclau; He Yongyi
- Music by: Breton Vivian
- Production companies: The Seventh Art Pictures; Huayi Brothers Pictures; Momo Pictures; Bona Film Group; Tencent Penguin Pictures; Tao Piao Piao; The Forge
- Release dates: 18 May 2024 (Cannes); 15 June 2024 (China); 25 July 2024 (Singapore)
- Running time: 110 minutes
- Country: China
- Language: Mandarin
- Box office: $4.6 million

Black Dog (Chinese: 狗阵; pinyin: Gǒu Zhèn; lit. 'Dog Formation') is a 2024 Chinese drama film directed by Guan Hu, starring Eddie Peng and Tong Liya. The film had its world premiere at the 77th Cannes Film Festival on 18 May 2024, where it won the Un Certain Regard prize.

== Plot ==
Former stunt motorcyclist Lang returns on parole to his hometown of Chixia on the outskirts of the Gobi Desert, where he was a local celebrity prior to his imprisonment for manslaughter. Many residents have left the failing town, leaving behind a large population of stray dogs. Lang's ailing and alcoholic father lives at a zoo he owns, which has long gone out of business.

A bounty is placed on a black dog that has been biting Chixia residents as part of a larger program to remove stray or unregistered animals before the 2008 Summer Olympics in Beijing. Lang pursues the bounty but returns defeated and bitten. Joining the local dog-capturing squad, he develops compassion for the dogs, leading to conflicts with the team members. When the dog is finally caught, Lang is tasked with transporting him, but becomes stranded in the wild overnight due to strong winds. He huddles with the dog in the cold and is bitten again. He is helped by a travelling circus group coming into town, and grows close with an unhappy dancer named Grape. Self-quarantining following the bite, Lang forms a bond with the black dog and decides to adopt him. Meanwhile, Lang's father is admitted to the hospital due to rapidly deteriorating health.

After spending time with Grape, Lang rides home drunk with the dog and is captured by snake farmer Butcher Hu, who seeks revenge for the death of his nephew a decade ago. He escapes captivity during an earthquake but is unable to locate the black dog. When he visits Hu's farm, he finds Hu bitten by a venomous snake and saves him. Hu thanks Lang, offers to reconcile, and explains that the dog has run off. Lang eventually finds the dog in critical condition at a dog racing venue out of town and takes him home. The dog later dies and Lang buries him in the desert, though it is revealed that he has fathered a puppy with another stray dog.

The whole town travels to the desert to see the solar eclipse, while the animals from the zoo are freed and roam the empty streets. As large-scale renovations of the town commence, Grape leaves on a long-distance bus by herself. On the night of the Olympics opening ceremony, Lang shares a final drink with his father in the hospital and pulls the plug, fulfilling the latter's wish. He then leaves town and rides off into the desert with the puppy.

== Cast ==
- Eddie Peng as Lang, a former convict
- Tong Liya as Grape, a circus performer in whom Lang takes romantic interest
- Jia Zhangke as Uncle Yao, who leads the canine round-up efforts
- Zhou You as Nie Shili
- Zhang Yi as Group leader
- Xin the dog

== Production ==
Guan Hu sought to tell the story of ordinary people left behind by the rapid economic development in China and cast actors who could bring a sense of realism to the project.

Eddie Peng established such a strong bond with Xin, the dog featured in the film, that he adopted the dog after filming had wrapped.

== Release ==
Black Dog was selected to be screened in the Un Certain Regard section of the 77th Cannes Film Festival, where it had its world premiere on 18 May 2024, and was officially released in mainland China on June 15 and in Singapore on July 25.

== Reception ==
=== Critical response ===
On the review aggregator website Rotten Tomatoes, 98% of 43 critics' reviews are positive, with an average rating of 7.9/10. The website's consensus reads: "Guan Hu delivers a poetic and redemptive journey through China with Black Dog, reminding us that the best of friends often has four legs." Metacritic, which uses a weighted average, assigned the film a score of 78 out of 100, based on 9 critics, indicating "generally favorable" reviews.

=== Accolades ===
Award	Ceremony date	Category	Recipient(s)	Result	Ref.
Cannes Film Festival	24 May 2024	Un Certain Regard	Black Dog	Won	
Cannes Film Festival	24 May 2024	Palm Dog Award - Grand Jury Prize	Xin	Won	
Gotham Awards	2 December 2024	Best Director	Guan Hu	Nominated	
Independent Spirit Awards	22 February 2025	Best International Film	Black Dog	Nominated	
Asian Film Awards	16 March 2025	Best Film	Black Dog	Nominated	
Asian Film Awards	16 March 2025	Best Director	Guan Hu	Nominated	
Asian Film Awards	16 March 2025	Best Actor	Eddie Peng	Nominated	
Asian Film Awards	16 March 2025	Best Production Design	Huo Tingxiao, Li Chang	Nominated	
Asian Film Awards	16 March 2025	Best Visual Effects	Danny Yin	Nominated	
Hong Kong Film Awards	27 April 2025	Best Asian Chinese Language Film	Black Dog	Nominated	
Belgian Film Critics Association	11 January 2026	Grand Prix	Black Dog	Won	
