= Desert of Namibia =

2024 film by Yôko Yamanaka

- Theatrical release poster
- Japanese: ナミビアの砂漠
- Directed by: Yoko Yamanaka
- Written by: Yoko Yamanaka
- Produced by: Keisuke Konishi; Shinji Ogawa; Masashi Yamada; Tokushi Suzuki
- Starring: Yuumi Kawai; Daichi Kaneko; Kanichiro
- Cinematography: Shin Yonekura
- Edited by: Banri Nagase
- Music by: Takuma Watanabe
- Production company: Happinet Phantom Studios
- Release date: 17 May 2024 (Cannes)
- Running time: 137 minutes
- Country: Japan
- Language: Japanese
- Box office: $27,915

Desert of Namibia (Japanese: ナミビアの砂漠) is a 2024 Japanese psychological drama film written and directed by Yoko Yamanaka. It stars Yuumi Kawai, Daichi Kaneko, and Kanichiro.

The film had its world premiere in the Directors' Fortnight section of the 2024 Cannes Film Festival on 17 May, where it won the FIPRESCI Prize. For her performance, Kawai won a Blue Ribbon Award for Best Actress and received nominations at the 17th Asia Pacific Screen Awards and 18th Asian Film Awards.

== Plot ==
In Tokyo, Kana, a 21-year-old beauty salon employee of partial Chinese ancestry, meets with her friend Ichika at a café. Ichika tells Kana that, Chiaki, a former classmate of hers and schoolmate of Kana’s, recently committed suicide for no apparent reason. Now, she is guilt-ridden because the day prior, Chiaki had video called Ichika, but Ichika did not take the opportunity to make plans to meet up. Kana has little memory of Chiaki and is largely unmoved but seeing how affected Ichika is, takes her to a bar for drinks. Leaving the bar, she meets Hayashi, her lover, and they spend time together before returning to their respective homes. Kana lives with Honda, her other lover.

After work the next day, Kana and Honda reenact a conversation between Honda and his employer where the latter asks the former to go to hostess bars for business reasons, with Honda claiming that he will not go, even if it means being fired. They are interrupted when Hayashi calls to make plans. Lying to Honda that it was Ichika who called, asking her to spend the night with her, she meets up with Hayashi and they spend the night. He asks her to leave Honda, which she agrees to. One night, Honda confesses to having gone to a hostess bar, but clarifies that he was not titillated. Kana laughs it off and claims to not care.

Some time later, while Honda is on a business trip, Kana moves in with Hayashi. One day, while looking through his things, she finds a picture of a prenatal ultrasound and is disturbed. Accompanying Hayashi to a social gathering, she mostly mills around but is unnerved when he introduces her to Kanako, a woman he has not seen in a long time. At home, when Hayashi delays eating with Kana to work on a project, she throws a tantrum and leaves the house but falls on a flight of stairs and is severely injured. Hayashi nurses her back to health and she is able to return to work. On her way home from work, she is stopped by Honda, who desperately wants to know what happened to her. She gets in his car but then runs out. Honda pursues her but falls to the ground, a sight Kana finds weird and laughable.

Kana walks in on Hayashi writing a screenplay about a jobless man who raises an abandoned baby. When she asks him whether he is trying to atone for his sins and he expresses confusion, she brings out the photo. Hayashi claims to have forgotten about it. When asked whether the baby was given birth or aborted, he tells her that the baby was not born and aborted, but he did not force the woman to do so. When Hayashi answers evasively about the woman’s identity, Kana throws a tantrum and forces him to call her to apologize for traumatizing her and forgetting all about it. When Hayashi refuses and tells her that it is none of her business, she attacks him and accuses him of murdering the baby. In the ensuing struggle, Hayashi escapes the apartment. Leaning against a wall, Kana hears a neighbor reciting English words. Some time later, Kana reveals to Hayashi that she was fired for telling a customer to pursue medical instead of cosmetic treatment and belittles their digital literacy. She then tells him that she will not do anything anymore and leave everything for him to do, and that as an artist, he should try to create something meaningful, but she does not elaborate. When Hayashi walks away from the conversation, Kana assaults him yet again.

Kana schedules a video call with a male physician who proposes bipolar disorder and borderline personality disorder as potential diagnoses of her mental health problems but refers her to a cheaper clinic. There, Kana meets with a female physician and reveals to her that her father was a pedophile who committed incest with her but still believes she has to respect and forgive him. The physician encourages her to express her true feelings about him when she is alone, but Kana is agonized by the fact that many people in the world think differently from how they act. At night, she goes out onto the balcony to get some air and coincidentally exchanges glances with the English-learning neighbor, another young woman.

Returning happily from a shopping trip, Kana and Hayashi meet the neighbor while taking the elevator and Kana cryptically claims that the neighbor knows all about the both of them. In the apartment, they fight again for no specified reason. Kana is later seen watching footage of their fight on her phone while running on a treadmill in a warehouse of sorts. She visits the female physician again and confides in her to feeling a little lost. One night, while hiding in a forested area, the neighbor finds Kana. Over a campfire, the neighbor shares drinks with Kana, offers her perspective on the photo of the ultrasound, and tells her about misleadingly named animals. The two then prance around the campfire joyously.

Another day, another tussle between Kana and Hayashi. Afterwards, they sit down together and eat. However, the meal is disrupted when she answers a video call from her Chinese relatives, who have gathered for a meal. Kana’s very limited Chinese speaking and comprehension skills, combined with the fact that her mother is not at the gathering, creates an awkward atmosphere as she repeats a Chinese phrase to indicate that she does not understand what is being said. Hanging up the call, Kana and Hayashi resume the meal in awkward silence until Hayashi asks Kana to translate the Chinese phrase into Japanese for him; she obliges. When he then repeats the phrase out of the blue, they burst into laughter. After a moment, Hayashi looks at Kana with a slight smile. Meanwhile, Kana looks at the table forlornly before lifting her head to meet his gaze and smiling slightly.

== Cast ==
- Yuumi Kawai as Kana
- Daichi Kaneko as Hayashi
- Kanichiro as Honda
- Yuzumi Shintani as Ichika
- Keisuke Horibe as Koichiro
- Makiko Watanabe as Mari

== Release ==
Desert of Namibia had its world premiere at the 2024 Cannes Film Festival on 17 May 2024 in the Directors' Fortnight section. It won the FIPRESCI Prize at the festival, and the director Yoko Yamanaka became the youngest woman to win the award.

In November 2024, it was reported that Kani Releasing acquired the film's North American rights.

== Reception ==
Siddhant Adlakha of Variety described the film as "an intentionally languid psychological portrait". William Repass of Slant Magazine gave the film two and a half stars out of four and praised Kawai's performance, describing it as "arresting". Mark Schilling of The Japan Times gave the film three out of five stars and described Kawai's performance as "masterful and multilayered".

Writing for Screen International, Fionnuala Halligan gave the film a mixed review and criticized the vague reference to mental health issues.

=== Accolades ===
Award	Date of ceremony	Category	Recipient(s)	Result	Ref.
Cannes Film Festival	25 May 2024	FIPRESCI Prize – Parallel Sections	Yoko Yamanaka	Won	
World Film Festival of Bangkok	17 November 2024	Lotus Award for Best Film	Yoko Yamanaka	Won	
Asia Pacific Screen Awards	30 November 2024	Best Film	Yoko Yamanaka and Keisuke Konishi	Nominated	
Asia Pacific Screen Awards	30 November 2024	Best Performance	Yuumi Kawai	Nominated	
Blue Ribbon Awards	28 January 2025	Best Actress	Yuumi Kawai	Won (Note: Shared with her performance in A Girl Named Ann.)	
Mainichi Film Awards	13 February 2025	Best Lead Performance	Yuumi Kawai	Won	
Asian Film Awards	16 March 2025	Best Actress	Yuumi Kawai	Nominated	
Asian Film Awards	16 March 2025	Best New Director	Yoko Yamanaka	Nominated	
