= Kazuhiro Sawataishi =

Japanese filmmaker, costume designer, and photographer

Kazuhiro Sawataishi (澤田石 和寛, Sawataishi Kazuhiro) (born 1984 in Kanagawa), also known by his artist name Kan Sawa (澤寛), is a Japanese filmmaker, costume designer, character designer, and photographer based in Tokyo.

In 2025, he was invited to join the Academy of Motion Picture Arts and Sciences (AMPAS) as a member of the Costume Designers branch. He is also a voting member of the Asian Film Awards Academy and has received two nominations for Best Costume Design at the Asian Film Awards, at the 5th and 13th editions of the ceremony.

== Education ==
Sawataishi completed his master's studies at the Graduate School of Fine Arts, Tokyo University of the Arts, and is currently enrolled in the doctoral (later) program at the same institution.

== Career ==
=== Film ===
Sawataishi has served as costume designer on films by a number of internationally recognized directors, including Takashi Miike (13 Assassins), Keishi Otomo (the Rurouni Kenshin series), Chen Kaige (Caught in the Web), Gakuryu Ishii (Punk Samurai Slash Down), and Toshiaki Toyoda (Transcending Dimensions). His work on Ishii's Bitter Honey was noted for its red color scheme.

He served as costume designer for Toshiaki Toyoda's Transcending Dimensions (2025), which won Best Director (Noves Visions) at the Sitges Film Festival in 2025. The film also screened at the International Film Festival Rotterdam.

Beyond feature films, his portfolio extends to costume design for television dramas and commercials.

In June 2025, the Academy of Motion Picture Arts and Sciences announced that Sawataishi had been invited to join the Costume Designers branch, citing his work on Rurouni Kenshin: The Legend Ends and 13 Assassins.

=== Directing ===
Working under the artist name Kan Sawa, he made his directorial debut with the feature film Family (かぞく, 2023), a live-action adaptation of the unfinished final manga by Seiki Tsuchida. The film stars Ryo Yoshizawa, Shun Oguri, Shinnosuke Abe, and Masatoshi Nagase. It was selected for the Nippon Cinema Now section of the 36th Tokyo International Film Festival, received a theatrical release in Japan in November 2023, and was subsequently distributed worldwide on Amazon Prime Video, available in over 200 countries and territories.

=== Photography ===
Under the name Kan Sawa, Sawataishi has been active as a photographer since 2018. His debut photographic series, Rapture, was exhibited at haku gallery in Kyoto from 12 April to 12 May 2019 as a satellite event of KYOTOGRAPHIE (KG+). The same year, he served as visual director for NHK's drama series Wonderwall and published an accompanying photo book of the same title. He has also exhibited the series POLISH, a photographic study of Yoshida Dormitory at Kyoto University, at AL gallery in Tokyo and at the Rissei Library in Kyoto.

His subsequent photo book, Heavens of Light, Planet of Solitude (2019), distributed globally, brings together a selection of photographs ranging from Tokyo street snaps and overseas landscapes to portraits and abstract architectural studies.

In 2025, Sawa was selected as one of twelve supported artists for the third term of the Tokyo Artist Accelerator Program (TAAP) organised by the Tokyo Metropolitan Government and Arts Council Tokyo.

=== Theater ===
Sawataishi has also collaborated with theater directors on major international productions. He worked with Giorgio Barberio Corsetti on The Threepenny Opera (Tokyo Festival 2018 / Shizuoka World Theatre Festival 2021), and with Satoshi Miyagi on Towards Joy (East Asia Cultural City 2023 Shizuoka).

=== Fashion ===
He produced and designed the fashion brand "Dammy".

== Filmography ==
=== As costume designer ===
- Crows Zero (2007)
- God's Puzzle (2008)
- Crows Zero 2 (2009)
- Tajomaru (2009) – costume design for Shun Oguri
- 13 Assassins (2010)
- Yusha Yoshihiko (TV mini-series; Season 1, 2011; Season 2, 2012)
- Seiji: Riku no Sakana (2012)
- Caught in the Web (2012)
- Rurouni Kenshin (2012)
- Flower of Shanidar (2013)
- Killers (2014)
- Joshi Zu (2014)
- Rurouni Kenshin: Kyoto Inferno (2014)
- Hot Road (2014)
- Rurouni Kenshin: The Legend Ends (2014)
- Soredake (2015)
- Shinjuku Swan (2015)
- The Whispering Star (2015)
- Lychee Light Club (2015)
- Nobunaga Concerto: The Movie (2016)
- Mitsu no Aware (2016)
- Himitsu (2016)
- Museum (2016)
- Punk Samurai Slash Down (2018)
- Transcending Dimensions (2025) – winner of Best Director (Noves Visions), Sitges Film Festival 2025

=== As director ===
- Family (かぞく, 2023) – credited as Kan Sawa; writer and director

== Photography ==
=== Selected exhibitions ===
- Rapture,AL, Tokyo / haku gallery, Kyoto – KYOTOGRAPHIE KG+ (2019)
- POLISH, AL, Tokyo / Rissei Library, Kyoto (2019)
- Heavens of Light, Planet of Solitude, AL, Tokyo (2019)

=== Photo books ===
- Wonderwall (2018)
- Heavens of Light, Planet of Solitude (2019)

== Theater ==
- The Threepenny Opera, directed by Giorgio Barberio Corsetti (Tokyo Festival 2018 / Shizuoka World Theatre Festival 2021)
- Towards Joy, directed by Satoshi Miyagi (East Asia Cultural City 2023 Shizuoka)
