= Samal Yeslyamova =

Kazakh film actress (born 1984)

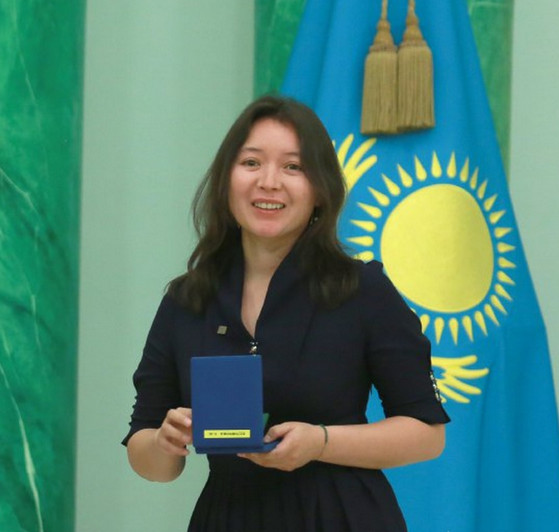
- Samal Yeslyamova awarded Honoured Culture Worker of Kazakhstan in 2018
- Born: Samal Ilyaskyzy Yeslyamova; 1 September 1984 (age 42); Petropavlovsk, North Kazakhstan Region, Kazakh SSR, Soviet Union
- Occupation: Actress
- Years active: 2008–present

Samal Ilyaskyzy Yeslyamova (Kazakh: Самал Ілиясқызы Есләмова, Samal Iliiasqyzy Eslämova; born 1 September 1984) is a Kazakh film actress. She is recognized internationally for starring in the film Ayka directed by Sergey Dvortsevoy, which won her the award for Best Actress at the Cannes Film Festival in 2018.

== Biography ==
Yeslyamova was born in Petropavl, North Kazakhstan Region, Kazakh SSR, Soviet Union. She always dreamed of becoming a journalist but eventually decided to become an actress. While studying at Russian Academy of Theatre Arts – GITIS in 2008, Yeslyamova played in the film Tulpan by Sergey Dvortsevoy. The film about the life of shepherds in the Kazakh Steppe won the main prize of the Prix Un Certain Regard competition of the Cannes Film Festival and another 9 Grand Prix of international film festivals around the world. In 2011, she graduated from the acting department of GITIS.

Ten years later, in May 2018, she received the Best Actress Award at the Cannes Film Festival for her role in Ayka by the same director. The actress played an immigrant worker from Kyrgyzstan who, driven by poverty, is forced to leave her child in the hospital. Filming lasted for six years.

In 2021, it was announced that Yeslyamova won the award for 2019 Best Actress for her role in the film “Ayka” at the Nika National Film Awards in Russia. Due to the COVID-19 pandemic, the 2019 and 2020 award ceremonies were postponed, and results were revealed in 2021.

== Selected filmography ==
- Tulpan (2008) as Samal
- Ayka (2018) as Ayka
- The Horse Thieves. Roads of Time (2019) as Aigal
- Three (2020) as Dina Sadikhov

== Awards and nominations ==
Associations	Year	Category	Work	Result	Ref.
Asia Pacific Screen Awards	2018	Best Performance by an Actress	Ayka	Nominated	
Asia Pacific Screen Awards	2019	Best Performance by an Actress	The Horse Thieves. Roads of Time	Nominated	
Asian Film Awards	2019	Best Actress	Ayka	Won	
Cannes Film Festival	2018	Best Actress	Ayka	Won	
International Antalya Film Festival	2018	Best Actress	Ayka	Won	
Nika Award	2021	Best Actress	Ayka	Won (Note: Tied with Viktoria Miroshnichenko for Beanpole (Дылда))	
Russian Guild of Film Critics	2020	Best Actress	Ayka	Nominated	

=== Honours ===
- 2026: In October 2026, Yeslyamova served as a member of the Competition Jury at the 31st Busan International Film Festival.
