= Asian Film Award for Best Costume Design =

- Country: Hong Kong
- Presented by: Asian Film Awards Academy
- First award: 2010
- Final award: 2023
- Winner (2023): Man Lim-chung; The Goldfinger
- Website: www.afa-academy.com

The Asian Film Award for Best Costume Design is one of the Asian Film Awards, starting in 2010 in its fourth edition. It has been awarded annually by the Hong Kong International Film Festival Society, and later by the Asian Film Awards Academy, starting in 2013.

== Winners and nominees ==
Winners are listed first and highlighted in bold.

| Year (edition) | Film (Country / Region) | Nominees |
|---|---|---|
**2010** (4th)
| **2010** (4th) | **Face** (Taiwan) | **Christian Lacroix, Anne Dunsford, Wang Chia-Hui** |
| **2010** (4th) | Bodyguards and Assassins (Hong Kong) | Dora Ng |
| **2010** (4th) | The Sword with No Name (South Korea) | Shim Hyun-seob |
| **2010** (4th) | Goemon (Japan) | Tina Kalivas, Vaughan Alexander |
| **2010** (4th) | The Warrior and the Wolf (China) | Wada Emi |
**2011** (5th)
| **2011** (5th) | **Let the Bullets Fly** (China, Hong Kong) | **William Chang Suk Ping** |
| **2011** (5th) | 13 Assassins (Japan) | Kazuhiro Sawataishi |
| **2011** (5th) | Detective Dee and the Mystery of the Phantom Flame (China, Hong Kong) | Bruce Yu Ka-on |
| **2011** (5th) | Norwegian Wood (Japan) | Yen-Khe Luguern |
| **2011** (5th) | The Housemaid (South Korea) | Choi Se-yeon |
**2012** (6th)
| **2012** (6th) | **The Flying Swords of Dragon Gate** (Hong Kong, China) | **Yee Chung-Man, Lai Hsuan-wu** |
| **2012** (6th) | Milocrorze: A Love Story (Japan) | Amano Kyoko, Emura Kouichi |
| **2012** (6th) | The Flowers of War (China) | William Chang Suk-ping |
| **2012** (6th) | White Vengeance (China, Hong Kong) | Mok Kwan-kit, Wong Ming-ha |
| **2012** (6th) | The Outrage (Thailand) | Noppadol Techo |
**2013** (7th)
| **2013** (7th) | **The Silent War** (China, Hong Kong) | **Man Lim-chung** |
| **2013** (7th) | The Last Supper (China) | Chen Xue-bing & Zhong Jia-ni |
| **2013** (7th) | The Last Tycoon (China, Hong Kong) | Jessie Dai Mei-ling & Chan Chi-man |
| **2013** (7th) | A Werewolf Boy (South Korea) | Kwak Jung-ae |
| **2013** (7th) | The Floating Castle (Japan) | Otsuka Mitsuru, Matsunaga Kazuta & Inamura Akihiko |
**2014** (8th)
| **2014** (8th) | **The Grandmaster** (Hong Kong, China) | **William Chang** |
| **2014** (8th) | Snowpiercer (South Korea, United States, France) | Catherine George |
| **2014** (8th) | Young Detective Dee: Rise of the Sea Dragon (Hong Kong, China) | Pik Kwan Lee, Bruce Yu |
| **2014** (8th) | The Face Reader (South Korea) | Shim Hyun-sub |
**2015** (9th)
| **2015** (9th) | **Gone with the Bullets** (Hong Kong) | **William Chang** |
| **2015** (9th) | Over Your Dead Body (Japan) | Isao Tsuge |
| **2015** (9th) | The Fatal Encounter (South Korea) | Jeong Gyeong-hee |
| **2015** (9th) | The Taking of Tiger Mountain (South Korea) | Kwon Yu-jin |
| **2015** (9th) | Brotherhood of Blades (China) | Liang Tingting |
**2016** (10th)
| **2016** (10th) | **The Throne** (South Korea) | **Lee Ji-yeon, Shim Hyun-seob** |
| **2016** (10th) | Bajirao Mastani (India) | Anju Modi, Maxima Basu |
| **2016** (10th) | Heneral Luna (Philippines) | Carlo Tabije |
| **2016** (10th) | The Assassin (Taiwan, China, Hong Kong) | Hwarng Wern-ying |
| **2016** (10th) | Kakekomi (Japan) | Masae Miyamoto |
**2017** (11th)
| **2017** (11th) | **The Handmaiden** (South Korea) | **Jo Sang-gyeong** |
| **2017** (11th) | The Wasted Times (China) | Yee Chung-Man |
| **2017** (11th) | The Sanada Ten Braves (Japan) | Kazuko Kurosawa |
| **2017** (11th) | Train to Busan (South Korea) | Kwon Yoo-jin, Rim Seung-hee |
| **2017** (11th) | See You Tomorrow (China, Hong Kong) | William Chang, Cheung Siu-hong |
**2018** (12th)
| **2018** (12th) | **Legend of the Demon Cat** (China) | **Chen Tongxun** |
| **2018** (12th) | Anarchist from Colony (South Korea) | Shim Hyun-sup |
| **2018** (12th) | Baahubali 2: The Conclusion (India) | Rama Rajamouli, Prashanti Tipirneni |
| **2018** (12th) | Blade of the Immortal (Japan) | Yuya Maeda |
| **2018** (12th) | The Thousand Faces of Dunjia (Hong Kong, Mainland China) | Shirley Chan |
**2019** (13th)
| **2019** (13th) | **Shadow** (China) | **Chen Minzheng** |
| **2019** (13th) | Hidden Man (China) | Dong Zhongmin, Uma Wang & Zhang Shuping |
| **2019** (13th) | Project Gutenberg (Hong Kong, China) | Man Lim Chung |
| **2019** (13th) | Punk Samurai Slash Down (Japan) | Kazuhiro Sawataishi |
| **2019** (13th) | The Spy Gone North (South Korea) | Chae Kyung-hwa |
**2020** (14th)
| **2020** (14th) | **Happy Old Year** (Thailand) | **Pacharin Surawatanapongs** |
| **2020** (14th) | Better Days (Hong Kong, China) | Dora Ng |
| **2020** (14th) | Forbidden Dream (South Korea) | Cho Sang-kyung |
| **2020** (14th) | Gully Boy (India) | Arjun Bhasin, Poornamrita Singh |
| **2020** (14th) | Kingdom (Japan) | Masae Miyamoto |
**2021** (15th)
| **2021** (15th) | **Wife of a Spy** (Japan) | **Valerian Spring Tree** |
| **2021** (15th) | Cliff Walkers (China) | Chen Minzheng |
| **2021** (15th) | Space Sweepers (South Korea) | Cho Sang-kyung, Kwak Jung-ae |
| **2021** (15th) | The Book of Fish (South Korea) | Shim Hyun-seob |
| **2021** (15th) | Yellow Cat (Kazakhstan) | Yermek Utegenov |
**2022** (16th)
| **2022** (16th) | **Anita (Hong Kong)** | **Karen Yip, Dora NG** |
| **2022** (16th) | Alienoid (South Korea) | Ryu Hyun-min, Oh Jung-geun |
| **2022** (16th) | Before, Now & Then (Indonesia) | Retno Ratih Damayanti |
| **2022** (16th) | Egoists (Japan) | Shinozuka Nami |
| **2022** (16th) | Ponniyin Selvan: I (India) | Eka Lakhani |
