= Ayka =

2018 film

- Film poster
- Directed by: Sergey Dvortsevoy
- Written by: Sergey Dvortsevoy; Gennadiy Ostrovskiy
- Produced by: Sergey Dvortsevoy; Anna Wydra; Thanassis Karathanos; Martin Hampel; Gulnara Sarsenova; Michel Merkt
- Starring: Samal Yeslyamova; Polina Severnaya; Andrey Kolyadov
- Cinematography: Jolanta Dylewska
- Edited by: Sergei Dvortsevoy; Petar Markovic
- Release date: 18 May 2018 (Cannes)
- Running time: 100 minutes
- Countries: Russia; France; Germany; Poland; China; Kazakhstan
- Languages: Kyrgyz; Russian

Ayka (Russian: Айка) is a 2018 drama film directed by Sergey Dvortsevoy. It was selected to compete for the Palme d'Or at the 2018 Cannes Film Festival. At Cannes, Samal Yeslyamova won the award for Best Actress. It was selected as the Kazakhstani entry for the Best Foreign Language Film at the 91st Academy Awards, making the December shortlist. The film was produced under the working title My Little One.

== Plot ==
The story is centered around a young Kyrgyz woman named Ayka who lives in Moscow, Russia. After giving birth to a baby, she abandons the newborn, escaping through a hospital window. She is desperate for income, as she owes money to criminals but now struggles to repay the debt. She returns to a job plucking chicken feathers. After the work is done, the men running the operation leave without paying their workers. Trying to regain another previous job, Ayka finds that she has been permanently replaced while in labor. With her work permit expired and pain and complications from the pregnancy, it is nearly impossible for her to find or keep another employment. Ayka finally gets a part-time job as a cleaner at the veterinary clinic.

Debt collectors find her and demand she return their money, threatening to torture her sister back in Kyrgyzstan. She confesses to them about the recent birth of a son, saying that she became pregnant as a result of rape. They offer to take her child in order to settle her debts.

== Cast ==
- Samal Yeslyamova as Ayka
- Polina Severnaya as the hospital administrator
- Andrey Kolyadov as Victor, the chief

== Reception ==
=== Critical response ===
Ayka has an approval rating of 82% on review aggregator website Rotten Tomatoes, based on 11 reviews, and an average rating of 6.7/10.

== Awards and nominations ==
Award	Date of ceremony	Category	Recipient(s)	Result	Ref(s)
Cannes Film Festival	19 May 2018	Palme d'Or	Sergey Dvortsevoy	Nominated	
Cannes Film Festival	19 May 2018	Best Actress	Samal Yeslyamova	Won	
Asian Film Awards	17 March 2019	Best Actress	Samal Yeslyamova	Won	
Russian Guild of Film Critics	22 January 2020	Best Film	Sergey Dvortsevoy	Nominated	
Russian Guild of Film Critics	22 January 2020	Best Director	Sergey Dvortsevoy	Nominated	
Russian Guild of Film Critics	22 January 2020	Best Actress	Samal Yeslyamova	Nominated	
Russian Guild of Film Critics	22 January 2020	Best Cinematographer	Jolanta Dylewska	Nominated	
Nika Award	25 April 2021	Best Film	Sergey Dvortsevoy	Nominated	
Nika Award	25 April 2021	Best Director	Sergey Dvortsevoy	Nominated	
Nika Award	25 April 2021	Best Actress	Samal Yeslyamova	Won (Note: Tied with Viktoria Miroshnichenko for Beanpole)	
Nika Award	25 April 2021	Best Screenplay	Sergey Dvortsevoy; Gennadiy Ostrovskiy	Nominated	
Nika Award	25 April 2021	Best Film Editing	Petar Markovic	Won	

== See also ==
- List of submissions to the 91st Academy Awards for Best Foreign Language Film
- List of Kazakhstani submissions for the Academy Award for Best Foreign Language Film
