= 17th Asian Film Awards =

2024 edition of award ceremony

- Official poster
- Awarded for: Excellence in Asian cinema
- Awarded by: Hong Kong International Film Festival; Busan International Film Festival; Tokyo International Film Festival
- Presented by: The Asian Film Awards Academy (AFAA)
- Announced on: Nominations: January 12, 2024
- Presented on: March 10, 2024
- Site: Xiqu Centre, Hong Kong
- Official website: afa-academy.com

Television coverage
- Network: YouTube

The 17th Asian Film Awards was held on March 10, 2024 at the Xiqu Centre, Hong Kong. The nominations were announced on January 12, 2024. The winners were announced on March 10, 2024 with Evil Does Not Exist winning the best film award.

== Jury ==
- Kiyoshi Kurosawa – Jury President, director and writer

== Winners and nominations ==
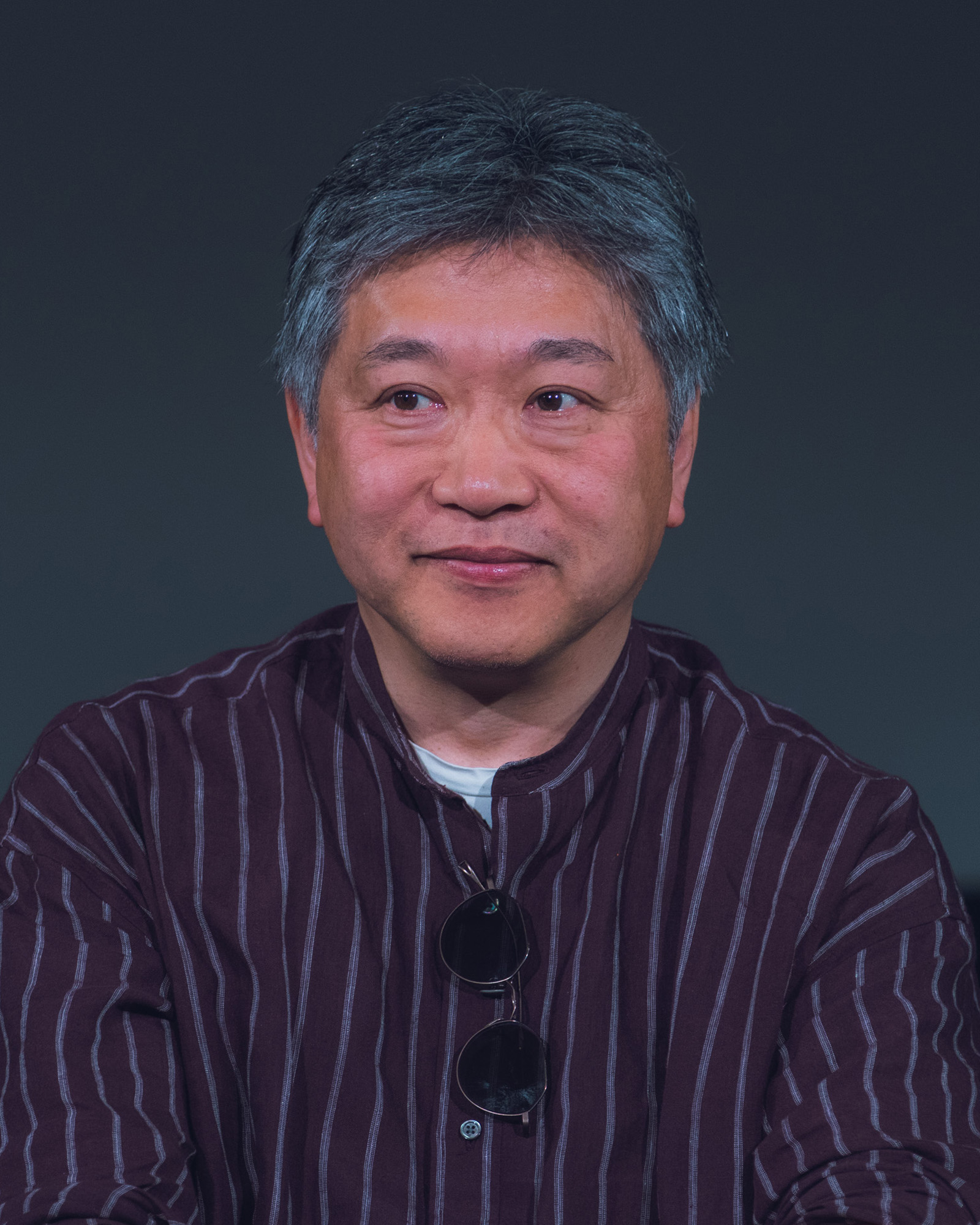
Hirokazu Kore-eda, winner of Best Director Award

The nominations were announced on January 12, 2024 and led by Evil Does Not Exist and 12.12: The Day with six.

Best Film: (Japan) Evil Does Not Exist; (South Korea) 12.12: The Day; (Sri Lanka) / (India) Paradise; (Japan) Perfect Days; (China) Snow Leopard	Best Director: (Japan) Hirokazu Kore-eda – Monster; (China) Gu Xiaogang – Dwelling by the West Lake; (Japan) Ryusuke Hamaguchi – Evil Does Not Exist; (South Korea) Kim Sung-su – 12.12: The Day; (Sri Lanka) Prasanna Vithanage – Paradise
Best Actor: (Japan) Koji Yakusho – Perfect Days as Hirayama; (South Korea) Hwang Jung-min – 12.12: The Day as Major General Chun Doo-gwang; (Hong Kong) Tony Leung Chiu-wai – The Goldfinger as Henry Ching; (China) Shen Teng – Full River Red as Zhang Da; (Malaysia) Wu Kang-ren – Abang Adik as Chen Ah-bang	Best Actress: (China) Jiang Qinqin – Dwelling by the West Lake as Tai Hua; (South Korea) Jung Yu-mi – Sleep as Soo-jin; (Japan) Rinko Kikuchi – 658km, Yoko no Tabi as Yoko; (Taiwan) Audrey Lin – Trouble Girl as Xiao Xiao; (China) Zhou Dongyu – The Breaking Ice as Nana
Best Supporting Actor: (South Korea) Park Hoon – 12.12: The Day as Colonel Moon Il-pyeong; (Japan) Nakamura Shidō II – Kubi as Naniwa Mosuke; (South Korea) Park Jeong-min – Smugglers as Jang Do-ri; (Malaysia) Jack Tan – Abang Adik as Zhang Wen-di; (Hong Kong) Sean Wong – Time Still Turns the Pages as Eli Cheng Yau Kit	Best Supporting Actress: (Hong Kong) Rachel Leung – In Broad Daylight as Wong Siu-ling; (South Korea) Go Min-si – Smugglers as Go Ok-bun; (Japan) Minami Hamabe – Godzilla Minus One as Noriko Ōishi; (Japan) Mariko Tsutsui – Last Shadow at First Light as Satomi; (Taiwan) Wanfang – Snow in Midsummer as Ah Eng
Best New Director: (Hong Kong) Nick Cheuk – Time Still Turns the Pages; (Mongolia) Lkhagvadulam Purev-Ochir – City of Wind; (Malaysia) Amanda Nell Eu – Tiger Stripes; (Vietnam) Phạm Thiên Ân – Inside the Yellow Cocoon Shell; (India) Dominic Sangma – Rapture	Best Newcomer: (Mongolia) Tergel Bold-Erdene – City of Wind as Ze; (Thailand) Awat Ratanapintha – Doi Boy as Sorn; (Japan) Mihaya Shirata – Last Shadow at First Light as Ami; (China) Wang Yibo – Hidden Blade as Mr. Ye; (Hong Kong) Yoyo Tse – Fly Me to the Moon
Best Screenplay: Snow Leopard – Pema Tseden (China); Evil Does Not Exist – Ryusuke Hamaguchi (Japan); Monster – Yuji Sakamoto (Japan); Paradise – Prasanna Vithanage and Anushka Senanayake (Sri Lanka) / (India); Sleep – Jason Yu (South Korea)	Best Editing: 12.12: The Day – Kim Sang-bum (South Korea); Evil Does Not Exist – Ryusuke Hamaguchi and Azusa Yamazaki (Japan); Only the River Flows – Matthieu Laclau (China); Paradise – A. Sreekar Prasad (Sri Lanka) / (India); Time Still Turns the Pages – Nick Cheuk and Keith Hiu Chun Chan (Hong Kong)
Best Cinematography: Snow Leopard – Matthias Delvaux (China); 12.12: The Day – Lee Mo-gae (South Korea); Evil Does Not Exist – Yoshio Kitagawa (Japan); Only the River Flows – Zhiyuan Chengma (China); Qas – Azamat Dulatov (Kazakhstan)	Best Original Music: Evil Does Not Exist – Eiko Ishibashi (Japan); Dwelling by the West Lake – Shigeru Umebayashi (China); Qas – Akmaral Zykayeva (Kazakhstan); Rapture – Anon Ch Momin (India) / (China) / (Switzerland) / (Qatar) / (Netherlands); Road to Boston – Lee Dong-june (South Korea)
Best Costume Design: The Goldfinger – Man Lim-chung (Hong Kong) / (China); Creation of the Gods I: Kingdom of Storms – Tim Yip (China); Kubi – Kazuko Kurosawa (Japan); Smugglers – Yoon Jung-hee (South Korea); Snow in Midsummer – Elaine Ng (Malaysia) / (Taiwan) / (Singapore)	Best Production Design: The Goldfinger – Eric Lam (Hong Kong) / (China); Concrete Utopia – Cho Hwa-sung (South Korea); Monster – Keiko Mitsumatsu (Japan); Only the River Flows – Menglun Zhang (China); Snow Leopard – Daktse Drundrup (China)
Best Visual Effects: Godzilla Minus One – Takashi Yamazaki, Kiyoko Shibuya, Masaki Takahashi, and Tatsuji Nojima (Japan); Concrete Utopia – Eun Jae-hyun (South Korea); Creation of the Gods I: Kingdom of Storms – Douglas Hans Smith, Joshua Bryer, and Jeremy Ball (China); The Moon – Jin Jong-hyun (South Korea); The Wandering Earth 2 – Allen Wei, Ahdee Chiu, Ding Yanlai, and Eric Xu (China)	Best Sound: Godzilla Minus One – Natsuko Inoue (Japan); Concrete Utopia – Kim Suk-won and Kim Eun-jung (South Korea); Creation of the Gods I: Kingdom of Storms – Yang Jiang and Zhao Nan (China); Inside the Yellow Cocoon Shell – Vuong Gia Bao and Toh Xander (Vietnam) / (Singapore) / (France) / (Spain); Snow in Midsummer – Tu Duu-chih and Wu Shu-yao (Malaysia) / (Taiwan) / (Singapore)
Excellence in Asian Cinema Award: Lee Young-ae; Ryohei Suzuki	Lifetime Achievement Award Zhang Yimou
AFA Next Generation Award: (Thailand) Metawin Opas-iamkajorn	Asian Film Contribution Award To be announced

=== Films with multiple nominations and awards ===
Films that received multiple nominations
Nominations	Film
6	12.12: The Day
6	Evil Does Not Exist
4	Paradise
4	Snow Leopard
3	Concrete Utopia
3	Creation of the Gods I: Kingdom of Storms
3	Dwelling by the West Lake
3	Godzilla Minus One
3	The Goldfinger
3	Monster
3	Only the River Flows
3	Smugglers
3	Snow in Midsummer
3	Time Still Turns the Pages
2	Abang Adik
2	City of Wind
2	Inside the Yellow Cocoon Shell
2	Kubi
2	Last Shadow at First Light
2	Perfect Days
2	Qas
2	Rapture
2	Sleep
