= Asian Film Award for Best Actress =

Asian Film Awards

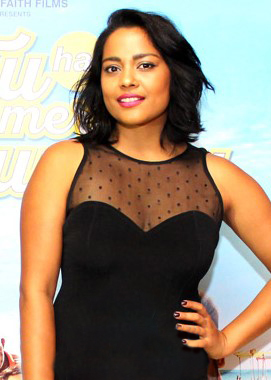
- The 2025 recipient: Shahana Goswami
- Awarded for: Best Performance by an Actress in a Leading Role in Asian Cinema
- Presented by: Asian Film Awards Academy
- First award: 2007
- Most recent winner: Shahana Goswami for Santosh (2025)
- Website: afa-academy.com

The Asian Film Award for Best Actress is presented annually by the Asian Film Awards Academy (AFAA), a non-profit organization founded by Busan International Film Festival, Hong Kong International Film Festival and Tokyo International Film Festival with the shared goal of celebrating excellence in Asian cinema. It was first presented in 2007.

== Winners and nominees ==
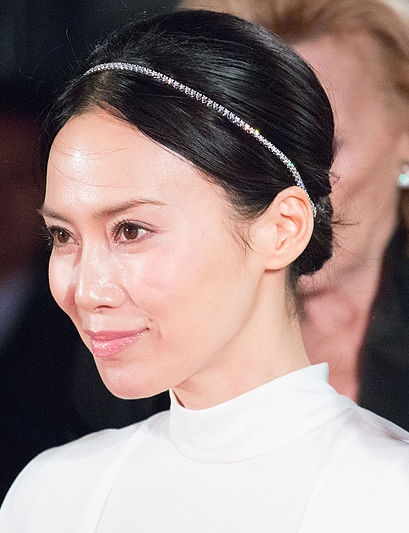
Miki Nakatani, winner 2007.

Jeon Do-yeon, winner 2008.

Zhou Xun, winner 2009.

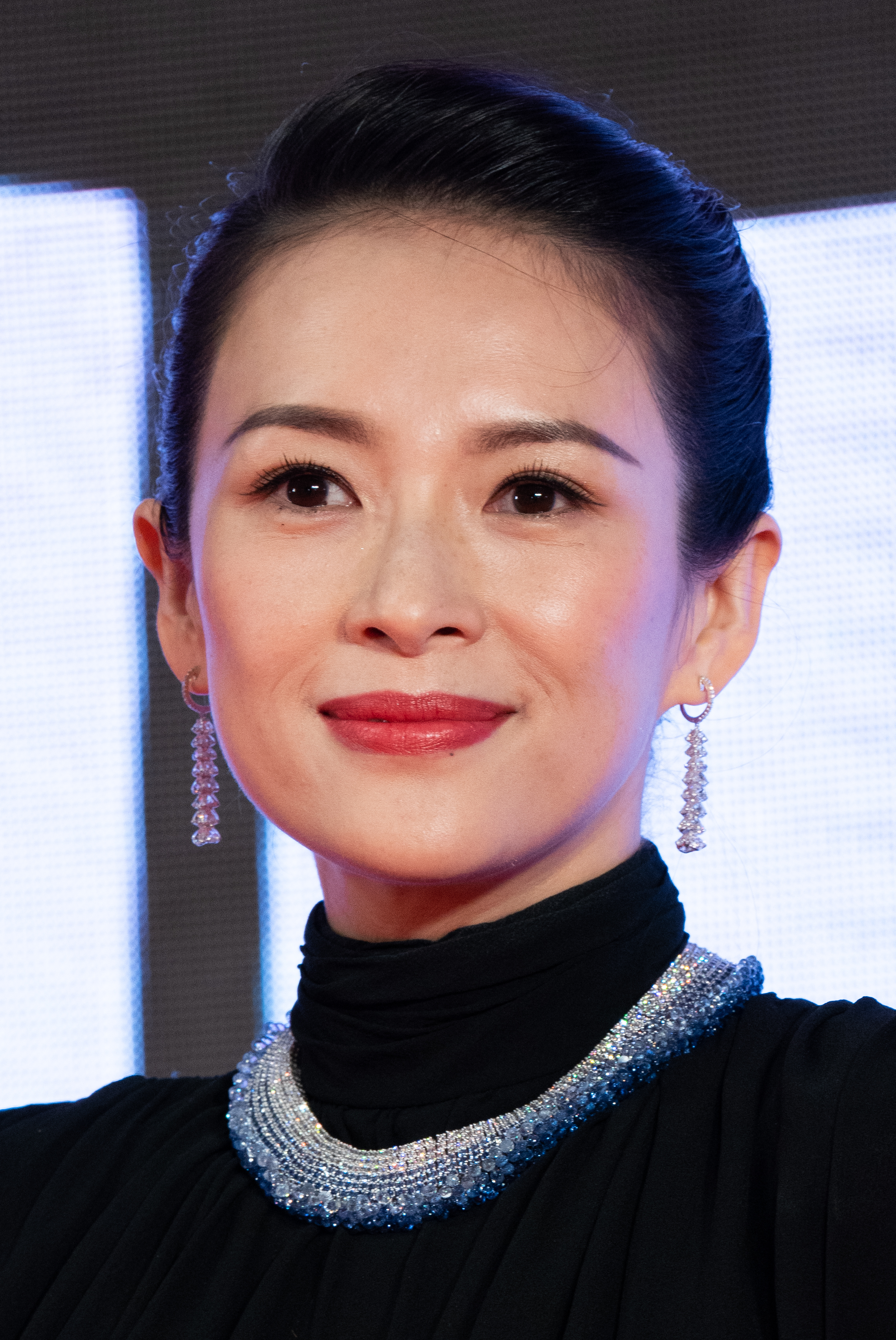
Zhang Ziyi, winner 2014.

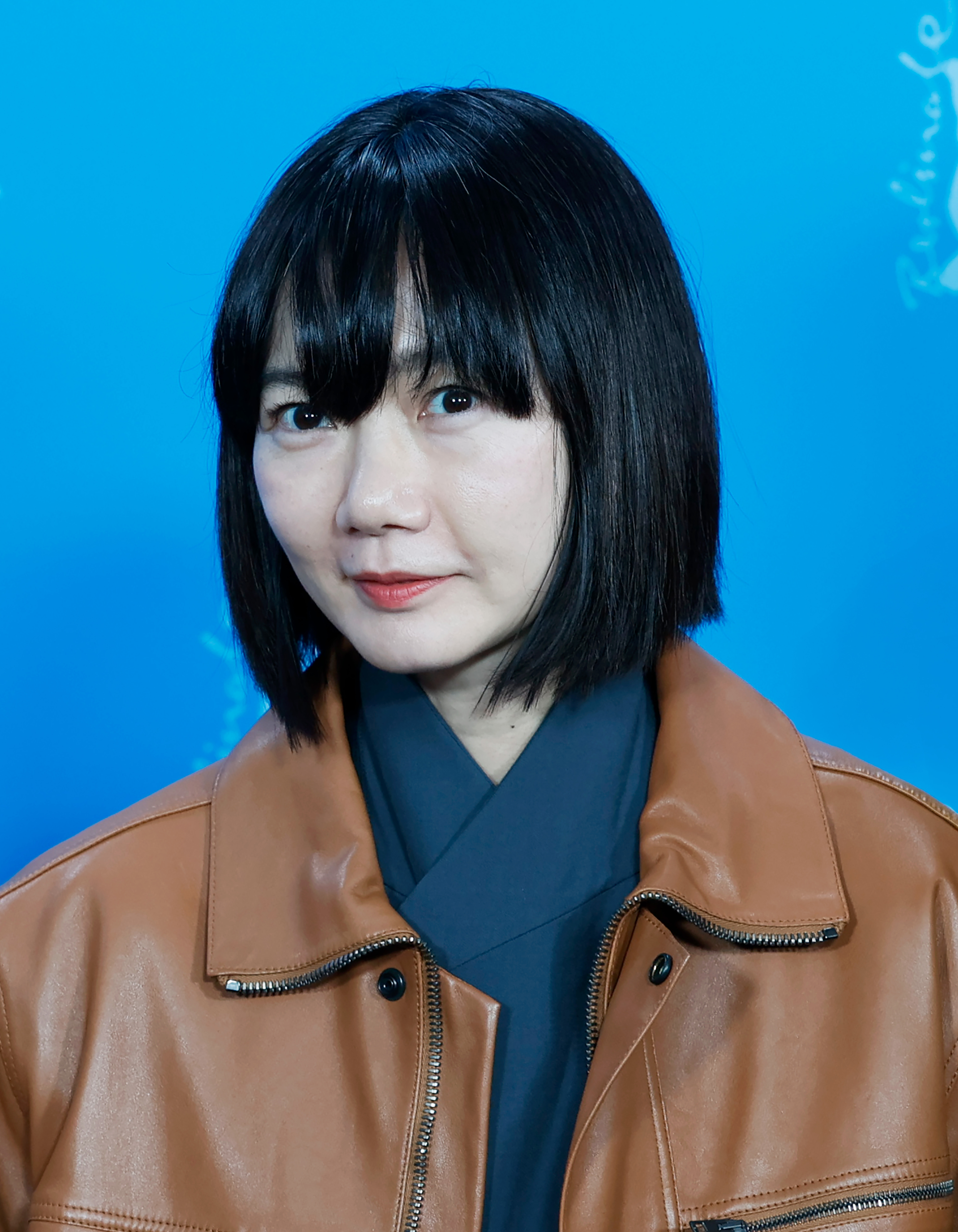
Bae Doona, winner 2015.

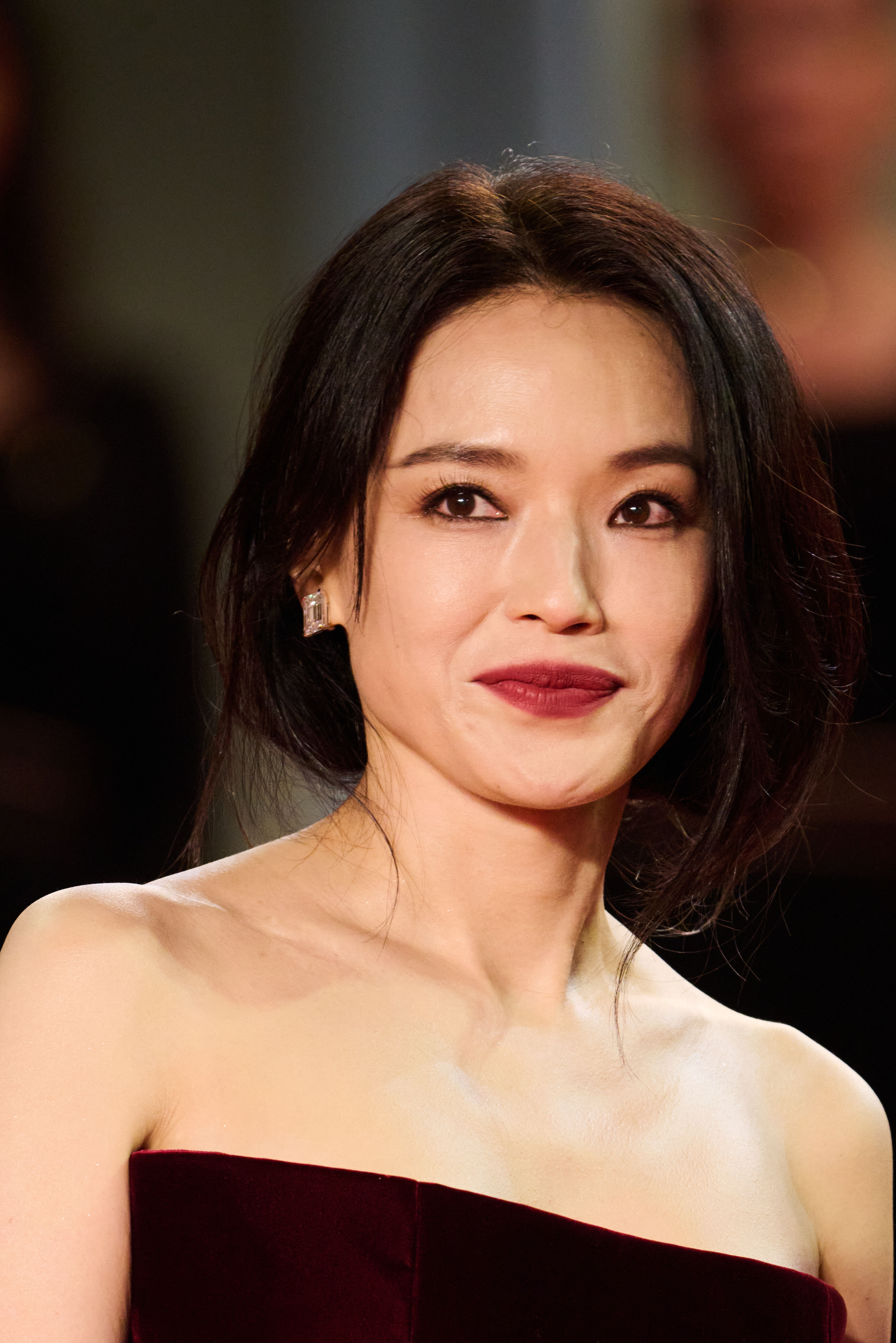
Shu Qi, winner 2016.

Fan Bingbing, winner 2017.

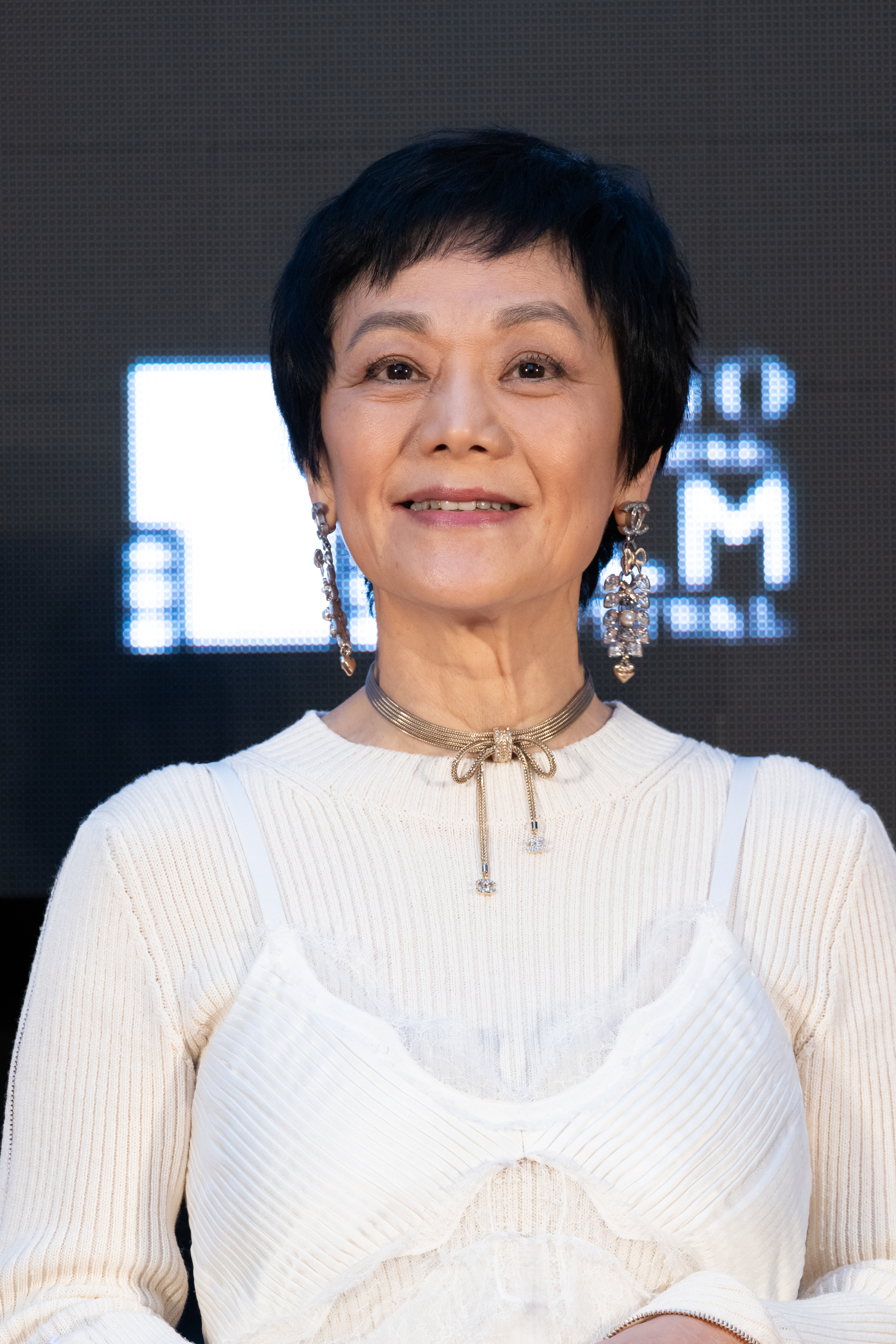
Sylvia Chang, winner 2018.

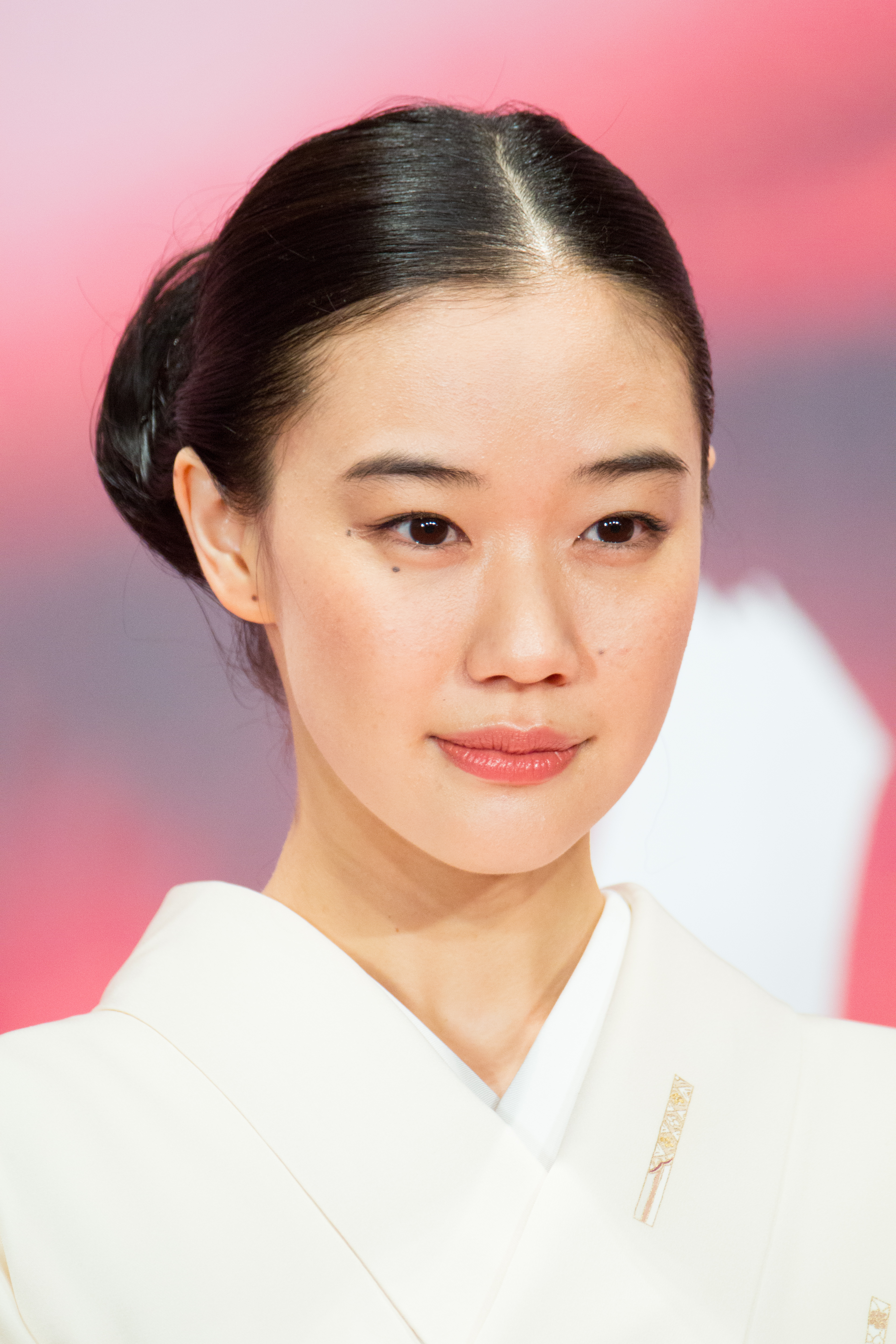
Yū Aoi, winner 2021.

Tang Wei, winner 2023.

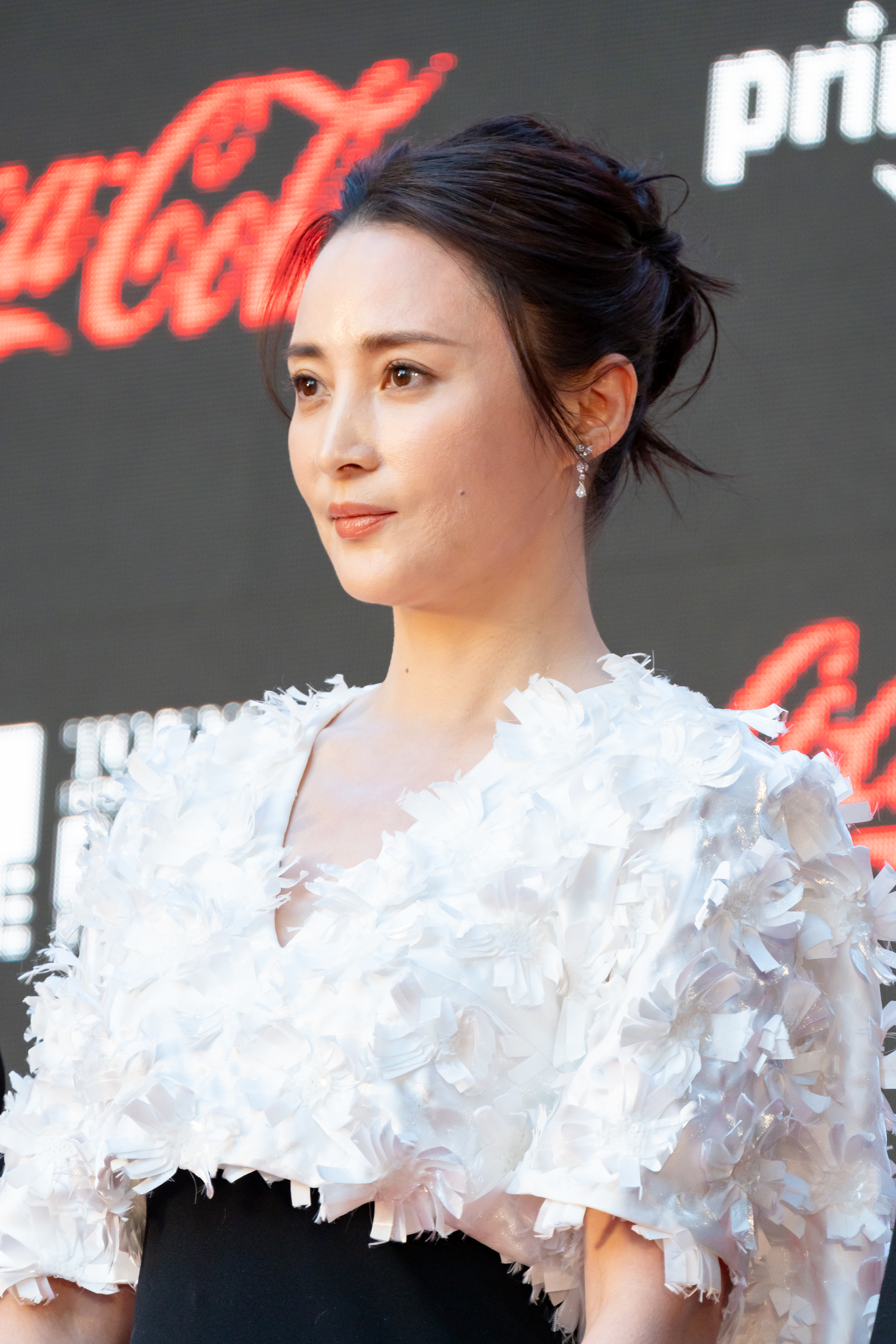
Jiang Qinqin, winner 2024.

=== 2000s ===
Year	Actress	English title	Original title	Ref.
2007	(Japan) Miki Nakatani	Memories of Matsuko	嫌われ松子の一生, Kiraware Matsuko no Isshō	
2007	(China) Gong Li	Curse of the Golden Flower		
2007	(South Korea) Kim Hye-soo	Tazza: The High Rollers	타짜 Tajja	
2007	(South Korea) Im Soo-jung	I'm a Cyborg, But That's OK	싸이보그지만 괜찮아	
2007	(Japan) Rie Miyazawa	Hana	花よりもなほ Hana yori mo Naho	
2007	(China) Zhang Ziyi	The Banquet	夜宴 Yè Yàn	
2008	(South Korea) Jeon Do-yeon	Secret Sunshine	밀양, Miryang	
2008	(China) Joan Chen	The Home Song Stories		
2008	(Japan) Kirin Kiki	Tokyo Tower	東京タワー 〜オカンとボクと、時々、オトン〜	
2008	(South Korea) Yunjin Kim	Seven Days	세븐 데이즈	
2008	(India) Deepika Padukone	Om Shanti Om		
2008	(China) Tang Wei	Lust, Caution		
2009	(China) Zhou Xun	The Equation of Love and Death	李米的猜想, Lǐ mǐ de cāi xiǎng	
2009	(Japan) Eri Fukatsu	The Magic Hour	ザ・マジックアワー	
2009	(China) Jiang Wenli	And the Spring Comes	立春 Lì chūn	
2009	(India) Deepika Padukone	Chandni Chowk to China		
2009	(Japan) Sayuri Yoshinaga	Kabei: Our Mother	母べえ	
2009	(China) Zhao Wei	Painted Skin		

=== 2010s ===
Year	Actress	English title	Original title	Ref.
2010	(South Korea) Kim Hye-ja	Mother	마더	
2010	(China) Li Bingbing	The Message	风声 Fēngshēng	
2010	(South Korea) Bae Doona	Air Doll	空気人形 Kūki Ningyō	
2010	(Taiwan) Sandrine Pinna	Yang Yang	陽陽	
2010	(Japan) Takako Matsu	Villon's Wife	ヴィヨンの妻 〜桜桃とタンポポ〜	
2011	(China) Xu Fan	Aftershock	唐山大地震	
2011	(South Korea) Jeon Do-yeon	The Housemaid	하녀 Hanyeo	
2011	(Japan) Rinko Kikuchi	Norwegian Wood	ノルウェイの森 Noruwei no mori	
2011	(Japan) Takako Matsu	Confessions	告白 Kokuhaku	
2011	(Malaysia) Michelle Yeoh	Reign of Assassins		
2012	(Hong Kong) Deanie Ip	A Simple Life	桃姐	
2012	(India) Vidya Balan	The Dirty Picture		
2012	(Taiwan) Michelle Chen	You Are the Apple of My Eye	那些年，我們一起追的女孩	
2012	(Philippines) Eugene Domingo	The Woman in the Septic Tank	Ang Babae sa Septic Tank	
2012	(Iran) Leila Hatami	A Separation	جدایی نادر از سیمین Jodái-e Náder az Simin	
2013	(Philippines) Nora Aunor	Thy Womb	Sinapupunan	
2013	(South Korea) Cho Min-soo	Pietà	피에타	
2013	(Iran) Golshifteh Farahani	The Patience Stone	سنگ صبور	
2013	(Taiwan) Gwei Lun-mei	Girlfriend, Boyfriend	女朋友。男朋友	
2013	(China) Hao Lei	Mystery		
2014	(China) Zhang Ziyi	The Grandmaster	一代宗師	
2014	(Philippines) Eugene Domingo	Barber's Tales	Mga Kuwentong Barbero	
2014	(South Korea) Han Hyo-joo	Cold Eyes	감시자들	
2014	(Hong Kong) Paw Hee-ching	Rigor Mortis	殭屍	
2014	(Japan) Yoko Maki	The Ravine of Goodbye	さよなら渓谷 Sayonara keikoku	
2015	(South Korea) Bae Doona	A Girl at My Door	도희야	
2015	(China) Gong Li	Coming Home	歸來	
2015	(India) Kalki Koechlin	Margarita With A Straw	Choone Chali Aasman	
2015	(Japan) Rie Miyazawa	Pale Moon	紙の月	
2015	(China) Tang Wei	The Golden Era	黃金時代	
2015	(China) Zhao Wei	Dearest	親愛的	
2016	(Taiwan) Shu Qi	The Assassin	刺客聶隱娘	
2016	(Japan) Haruka Ayase	Our Little Sister	海街diary	
2016	(South Korea) Kim Hye-soo	Coin Locker Girl	차이나타운	
2016	(Taiwan) Karena Lam	Zinnia Flower	百日告別	
2016	(China) Zhao Tao	Mountains May Depart	山河故人	
2017	(China) Fan Bingbing	I Am Not Madame Bovary	我不是潘金莲	
2017	(South Korea) Son Ye-jin	The Last Princess	덕혜옹주	
2017	(Japan) Haru Kuroki	A Bride for Rip Van Winkle	皆川 七海	
2017	(Hong Kong) Kara Hui	Happiness	幸運是我	
2017	(Philippines) Charo Santos-Concio	The Woman Who Left	Ang Babaeng Humayo	
2018	(Taiwan) Sylvia Chang	Love Education	相爱相亲	
2018	(Japan) Yū Aoi	Birds Without Names	彼女がその名を知らない鳥たち	
2018	(Indonesia) Marsha Timothy	Marlina the Murderer in Four Acts	Marlina Si Pembunuh Dalam Empat Babak	
2018	(South Korea) Kim Min-hee	The Day After	그	
2018	(China) Zhou Dongyu	This Is Not What I Expected	喜欢你	
2019	(Kazakhstan) Samal Yeslyamova	Ayka	Айка	
2019	(China) Zhao Tao	Ash Is Purest White	江湖儿女	
2019	(South Korea) Han Ji-min	Miss Baek	미쓰백	
2019	(Japan) Ando Sakura	Shoplifters	万引き家族	
2019	(Hong Kong) Chloe Maayan	Three Husbands	三夫	

=== 2020s ===
Year	Actress	English title	Original title	Ref.
2020	(China) Zhou Dongyu	Better Days	少年的你	
2020	(Thailand) Chutimon Chuengcharoensukying	Happy Old Year	ฮาวทูทิ้ง..ทิ้งอย่างไรไม่ให้เหลือเธอ	
2020	(South Korea) Jung Yu-mi	Kim Ji-young: Born 1982	82년생 김지영	
2020	(Japan) Mariko Tsutsui	A Girl Missing	よこがお	
2020	(Malaysia) Yeo Yann Yann	Wet Season	熱帶雨	
2020	(China) Yong Mei	So Long, My Son	地久天长	
2021	(Japan) Yū Aoi	Wife of a Spy	スパイの妻	
2021	(South Korea) Jeon Jong-seo	The Call	콜	
2021	(China) Zhang Zifeng	Sister	我的姐姐	
2021	(Taiwan) Chen Shu-fang	Little Big Women	孤味	
2021	(Kazakhstan) Assel Sadvakassova	Ulbolsyn	Ұлболсын	
2023	(South Korea) Tang Wei	Decision to Leave	헤어질 결심	
2023	(Taiwan) Sylvia Chang	A Light Never Goes Out	燈火闌珊	
2023	(Taiwan) Karena Lam	American Girl	美國女孩	
2023	(Indonesia) Happy Salma	Before, Now & Then	Nana	
2023	(Japan) Chieko Baisho	Plan 75	Mishi Kakutani	
2024	(China) Jiang Qinqin	Dwelling by the West Lake	草木人间	
2024	(South Korea) Jung Yu-mi	Sleep	잠	
2024	(Taiwan) Audrey Lin	Trouble Girl	小曉	
2024	(Singapore) / (China) Zhou Dongyu	The Breaking Ice	燃冬	
2024	(Japan) Rinko Kikuchi	658km, Yoko no Tabi	陽子の旅	
2025	(India) Shahana Goswami	Santosh		
2025	(India) Kani Kusruti	All We Imagine as Light		
2025	(Taiwan) Sylvia Chang	Daughter's Daughter	女兒的女兒	
2025	(South Korea) Kim Go-eun	Exhuma	파묘	
2025	(Japan) Yuumi Kawai	Desert of Namibia	ナミビアの砂漠	
2026	No awards given^{(The ceremony was suspended following a deadly fire in Hong Kong. Only special non-competitive honors were given)}			

== Multiple nominations ==
Nominations	Actress
3	Sylvia Chang
3	Tang Wei
3	Zhou Dongyu
2	Bae Doona
2	Eugene Domingo
2	Karena Lam
2	Gong Li
2	Jeon Do-yeon
2	Jung Yu-mi
2	Rinko Kikuchi
2	Kim Hye-soo
2	Takako Matsu
2	Rie Miyazawa
2	Deepika Padukone
2	Yū Aoi
2	Zhang Ziyi
2	Zhao Tao
2	Zhao Wei

== See also ==
- Blue Dragon Film Award for Best Actress
- Cannes Film Festival Award for Best Actress
- European Film Award for Best Actress
- Golden Horse Award for Best Leading Actress
- Hong Kong Film Award for Best Actress
- Japan Academy Film Prize for Outstanding Performance by an Actress in a Leading Role
