= The Field (2018 film) =

2018 French-Indian film

- Directed by: Sandhya Suri
- Written by: Sandhya Suri
- Produced by: Balthazar De Ganay; Thomas Bidegain
- Starring: Mia Maelzer; Ravi Choudhuri; Vittha Nagnath Kale
- Cinematography: Benoît Soler
- Edited by: Nicolas Chaudeurge
- Production companies: Film London; Lionfish Films; L'Homme du train
- Release date: 9 September 2018 (TIFF)
- Running time: 19 minutes
- Countries: France; India; United Kingdom

The Field is a short drama film, directed by Sandhya Suri and released in 2018. The film stars Mia Maelzer as Laila, a woman who works in the cornfields in the small agricultural town of Shahzadpur, Haryana, who has secret romantic interludes with her lover in the fields at night.

The film premiered at the 2018 Toronto International Film Festival, where it won the award for Best International Short Film.

== Awards ==
The film was a British Independent Film Award nominee for Best Short Film at the British Independent Film Awards 2018, and a BAFTA Award nominee for Best Short Film at the 72nd British Academy Film Awards in 2019.
