= Amiko =

- Film poster
- Japanese: あみこ
- Directed by: Yôko Yamanaka
- Written by: Yoko Yamanaka
- Produced by: Yoko Yamanaka
- Cinematography: Asuka Kato; Yoko Yamanaka
- Edited by: Yoko Yamanaka
- Music by: Shotaro Ohori
- Release date: February 2018 (Berlin)

Amiko (Japanese: あみこ) is a 2017 Japanese coming-of-age drama film. It was written, directed, and produced by Yôko Yamanaka.

== Synopsis ==
Amiko is about a high school girl named Amiko who has a crush on a boy named Aomi after they bond over their shared love of Radiohead and dislike of their boring hometown. After Aomi moves from their hometown, Nagano, to Tokyo, Amiko learns that he is living with his girlfriend. She goes to Tokyo to confront him, and learns about herself along the way.

== Cast ==
- Aira Sunohara as Amiko
- Hiroro Oshita as Aomi
- Maiko Mineo as Kanako

== Production and release ==
Director Yoko Yamanaka created the film at 19 years old, after dropping out of film school, and rest of the crew was similarly youthful, ranging from 18 to 20 years old. They created the film on a budget of $2,500, and part of that budget was spent repairing a car Yamanaka crashed on the way to the set. They rarely had permits for the locations where they shot footage and were sometimes chased away. The film debuted at the Pia Film Festival, and has been screened at several others including the Berlin International Film Festival, Japan Cuts in New York City, the Hong Kong International Film Festival, and Montreal's Fantasia International Film Festival.

== Critical reception ==
Many critics were quick to point out the film's high quality, despite its low budget. /Film said that its small budget fit with the youthful atmosphere it was trying to convey, closing their review by saying that the film is "a short burst of angst". Keno Katsuda of Women and Hollywood wrote that the film challenges "conventions of passive Japanese femininity". Clarence Tsui of the Hollywood Reporter seemed to be especially impressed with Yamanaka's camerawork and Sunohara's performance.

Multiple reviewers said it can be seen as similar to Lady Bird, but noted that while it centers on an acerbic teenager, the film is not at all about the titular character's relationship with her mother because there are no parents in this film.
