= Yoko Yamanaka =

Japanese film director (born 1997)

Yōko Yamanaka
- Born: 1997 (age 28–29); Nagano, Japan
- Occupation: Filmmaker
- Years active: 2017-present
- Notable work: Desert of Namibia; Amiko

Yōko Yamanaka (山中瑶子, Yamanaka Yōko; born 1997) is a Japanese filmmaker known for her 2017 film, Amiko, and 2024 film, Desert of Namibia.

== Career ==
Yamanaka dropped out of the Nihon University College of Art to create her debut film, Amiko. She wrote the screenplay at 19 years old, six months after graduating from high school. The film premiered in 2017 at the Pia Film Festival and won the Audience Award and the Hikari TV Award. Amiko subsequently showed at the 2018 Berlin International Film Festival, making Yamanaka the youngest director ever to premiere a film at the Berlin festival at only 20 years old.

Her next feature film, Desert of Namibia, screened at the Directors’ Fortnight at the 2024 Cannes Film Festival. She won the FIPRESCI Award at the festival for her work directing the film. At age 27, Yamanaka was the youngest female director to win this award and the sixth Japanese director to win.

== Personal life ==
Yamanaka was born in Nagano in 1997. Her mother is Chinese.

== Filmography ==
Year	Film	Credited as		
Year	Film	Director	Producer	Writer
2017	Amiko	Yes	Yes	Yes
2019	See You on the Other Side (short)	Yes	No	Yes
2024	Desert of Namibia	Yes	No	Yes
