= I for India =

- Directed by: Sandhya Suri
- Distributed by: ICA Projects
- Release date: 29 November 2005
- Running time: 70 minutes
- Countries: United Kingdom; Germany
- Languages: English; Hindi

I for India is a 2005 British-German documentary film directed by Sandhya Suri.

Directed by Sandhya Suri, it chronicles home movie footage (filmed on Super 8mm) and reel-to-reel tape recordings made by her father, Doctor Yash Pal Suri, starting from the 1960s. With the primitive state of telecommunications at the time, Dr. Suri sent the films and tapes to his family in India as a form of contact and information as to his new life in the UK with his wife and family. Dr. Suri reveals much of his innermost emotions, such as missing his family and home town, his difficulties at settling in a new country, and concern at the casual racism to which he was often subjected. The film also includes footage of various British TV programmes of its era regarding Asian emigrants (perceived as naively patronising), also incorporating part of an interview featuring Margaret Thatcher's views on emigration shortly before she became British prime minister.

It was distributed by ICA Projects. It was released theatrically in both the UK and the US.
