= Sergey Dvortsevoy =

Kazakh filmmaker of Russian origin

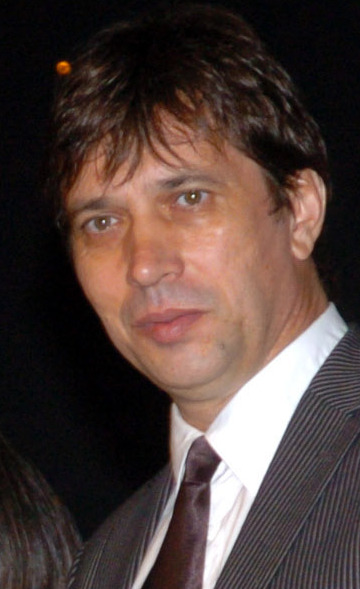
Dvortsevoy in 2008

Sergey Vladimirovich Dvortsevoy (born 1962) is a Kazakh filmmaker of Russian origin. His 2008 feature film Tulpan, was Kazakhstan's 2009 Academy Awards official submission to Foreign Language Film category.

== Early life ==
Dvortsevoy worked as an aviation engineer. He also worked for nine years as a radio engineer at Aeroflot; before studying film in Moscow in the early 1990s. His films immediately garnered international acclaim, receiving prizes and recognition at festivals around the world, including the nomination of Bread Day (1998) for the prestigious Joris Ivens Award at the Amsterdam International Documentary Film Festival. The following year, his work was presented at the Robert Flaherty Film Seminar, an institution dedicated to Flaherty's adherence to the goal of seeing and depicting the human condition. Dvortsevoy's documentaries are committed to observational filmmaking. His subjects are people living in and around Russia in transition—try in their individual ways to eke out an existence.

== Career ==
Tulpan was Dvortsevoy's first fiction film and was nominated for the 2009 Asia Pacific Screen Awards for Best Feature Film (which it won) and Best Achievement in Directing. The Findling Award was given to him for his first film Schastye.

== Filmography ==
- Paradise (1996)
- Bread Day (1998)
- Highway (1999)
- In the Dark (2004)
- Tulpan (2008)
- Ayka (2018)
