= Satoshi Miyagi =

Japanese theatre director

Satoshi Miyagi (宮城聰, Miyagi Satoshi; February 9, 1959) is a Japanese Theatre Director, in Kanda, Tokyo. He pursued studies in aesthetics at Tokyo University. He had a strong interest in Rakugo Japanese comic talk since his teens. He was awarded the Theatre Pasta Theatre Awards in 2007 for his excellent work in theatre.

== Biography ==
In 1980, Miyagi created a performance group at university and started his career as a director and actor. In 1990, he established the Ku Na’uka Theatre Company, known for its unique approach of assigning a single role to two actors.

In 1995, for the first edition of Theatre Olympics in Delphi, he presented Elektra with the Suzuki Company of Toga and Tadashi Suzuki. In 1996, the company ventured into the realm of Japanese classical theater. Tenshu-Monogatari, by Kyoka Izumi, was highly successful with audiences and toured many cities in Japan, India and Pakistan. Miyagi also presented Chushin-gura, originally written for Bunraku and Kabuki, for the 2nd edition of Theatre Olympics, held in Shizuoka.

=== Career ===
Miyagi is part of the P4 group of Japanese theatre directors, which also includes Yukikazu Kano, Oriza Hirata, and Masahiro Yasuda. As of 2011 he was the head of the International Department of Theater Interaction -Japan-, Secretary General of the BeSeTo (Beijing, Seoul, Tokyo) Theatre Festival, and the guest director of SPAC (Shizuoka Performing Arts Center; managed by Tadashi Suzuki).

== Awards ==
- Theatre Pasta Theatre Awards, 2007
