= Phạm Thiên Ân =

Vietnamese film director

- Born: November 1989 (age 36); Lâm Đồng province, Vietnam
- Education: Hoa Sen University
- Occupation: film director

Phạm Thiên Ân (born November 1989) is a Vietnamese film director. He is best known for his feature film Inside the Yellow Cocoon Shell (2023), which earned the Caméra d'Or award at the 2023 Cannes Film Festival.

== Early life ==
Thiên Ân was born in Lâm Đồng province, Vietnam in November 1989 and was raised in a Catholic family. He studied information technology at Hoa Sen University, but left before obtaining a degree. Before his filmmaking career, he worked as a wedding videographer.

== Career ==
Thiên Ân's directorial debut came in 2018, with the release of his short film "The Mute". He directed a second short film, "Stay Awake, Be Ready", which was released a year later in 2019, and was selected for the Directors' Fortnight section at the 2019 Cannes Film Festival.

In 2023, he was awarded the Caméra d'Or award for best debut feature at the 2023 Cannes Film Festival for his film Inside the Yellow Cocoon Shell. The North American rights for the film were acquired by film distributor Kino Lorber.

Thiên Ân has stated that his influences include Luis Buñuel, Kenji Mizoguchi, Theo Angelopoulos, Bela Tarr, and Andrei Tarkovsky.

== Filmography ==
- "The Mute" (Câm Lang) (short, 2018)
- "Stay Awake, Be Ready" (Hãy tinh thúc & san sàng) (short, 2019)
- Inside the Yellow Cocoon Shell (Bên Trong Vỏ Kén Vàng) (2023)

== Awards ==
=== 2023 ===
- Caméra d'Or, 2023 Cannes Film Festival (Inside the Yellow Cocoon Shell)
- Silver Screen Award, Singapore International Film Festival (Inside the Yellow Cocoon Shell)
- Grand Prize, Tokyo FILMeX, (Inside the Yellow Cocoon Shell)
