= One and Four =

- Directed by: Jigme Trinley
- Written by: Jigme Trinley
- Produced by: Pema Tseden; Lei Wang
- Starring: Jinpa; Wang Zheng; Kunde; Darggye Tenzin
- Cinematography: Lv Songye
- Edited by: Jin Di
- Music by: Ding Ke
- Release date: 2 November 2021 (Tokyo International Film Festival)
- Running time: 88 minutes
- Country: Tibet
- Language: Tibetan

One and Four (originally titled གཅིག་དང་བཞི། Yige he sige) is a 2021 Tibetan thriller film directed by Jigme Trinley, starring Jinpa, Wang Zheng, Kunde and Darggye Tenzin.

== Cast ==
- Jinpa as Sanggye
- Wang Zheng as The Tall Guy
- Kunde as Kunbo
- Darggye Tenzin as The Short Guy
- Tsemdo as a dead cop

== Release ==
The film premiered at the Tokyo International Film Festival on 2 November 2021.

== Reception ==
Jessica Kiang of Variety wrote that the film is "at times more a filmmaking exercise than a fully formed film, it’s because underneath all the impressive craft there’s not a whole lot of substance. But the texture is so convincing you can almost overlook that emptiness, especially when it’s all done with a sly wink and a mordant sense of mischief." Elizabeth Kerr of The Hollywood Reporter wrote that the film is "an efficient and visually engaging, if slightly familiar, tale of modern encroachment on the natural world and the violence it can bring." Kurt Halfyard of ScreenAnarchy wrote that while the film "appears not quite up to the difficult task of tangling and untangling itself", it "still remains an admirable first feature."
