= Asian Film Awards =

Annual film awards of Asia

- Current: 18th Asian Film Awards
- Awarded for: Excellence in cinematic achievements
- Location: Hong Kong; Busan, South Korea
- Country: Asia
- Presented by: Hong Kong International Film Festival Society (2007–2012); Asian Film Awards Academy (2013–present)
- First award: 2007
- Final award: 2025
- Website: www.afa-academy.com

The Asian Film Awards are presented annually by the Asian Film Awards Academy to recognise the excellence of the film professionals in the film industries of Asian cinema.

== History ==
The former Asian Film Awards trophy designed by William Chang used in the 3rd Asian Film Awards in 2009.

On 29 January 2007, Wilfred Wong, the Chairman of Hong Kong International Film Festival Society, announced the launch of the Asian Film Awards (AFA). The 1st Asian Film Awards occurred on 20 March 2007, on the opening night of the 31st Hong Kong International Film Festival (HKIFF) in Hong Kong Convention and Exhibition Centre. It honoured the best film achievements of the Asian cinema in the year 2006. It was attended by about 4000 guests from around the world.

The AFA Presentation Ceremony takes place as part of the Entertainment Expo Hong Kong Opening Gala. Eminent filmmakers and superstars from around the world are invited to bestow awards upon the winner(s) of each category, making the ceremony a dazzling extravaganza as well as an influential cultural event.

Throughout its history and since its inauguration in 2007, Chinese-language films and professionals from China, Taiwan, and Hong Kong have dominated the awards.

== The trophy ==
On 13 February 2007, the Hong Kong Trade Development Council hosted a celebration of Park Chan-wook's I'm a Cyborg, But That's OK announcement of being the opening film for the 31st Hong Kong International Film Festival at a reception in Berlin. At the same event the AFA trophy, designed by award-winning production designer, William Chang, was also unveiled.

According to William Chang, his inspiration behind the artwork was his admiration to a combination of architectural drawings and his own collection of antique statues. Measuring 36 cm (14 in), the trophy symbolises the joy and the accomplishment of all the award winners.

The current trophy is gold as a whole but had changed significantly before. The first trophies that were handed in 2007 has its trophy in black with a white base. In the 2nd AFA, the current gold colour was used as whole but in 2009 for its 3rd AFA instead of a gold base, it has a black base. Then in 2010, the whole gold trophy had returned and now used nowadays.

== Eligibility, nominations and voting ==
To be eligible, films must be feature length (more than 60 minutes); be in 35mm or 70mm film format or digital format suitable for exhibition in cinemas; and be fiction films from Asia. This encompasses all the cinemas of Asia: East Asia, Central Asia, South Asia, Southeast Asia and West Asia. Additionally, the films must have English subtitles.

The films must have been released between 1 January and 31 December of the year preceding the awards ceremony, and have been exhibited through a domestic theatrical release and distribution to at least one other country; been premiered at an international film festival; or received national film awards.

The Hong Kong International Film Festival Society compile the preliminary nomination list with the participation of the two parties who can submit films for the consideration to be included in the nomination list which are:

- the Asian Film Awards Official Submission Organisations are composed of recognised film organizations from different Asian territories. Each Official Submission Organisation can submit up to three films to represent their territory.
- the Asian Film Awards Jury is composed of film professionals from around the world. Each Jury Member can recommend up to two additional nominations in each Category.

After the Society finalised the nomination list, the Jury and the Voting Members (composed of previous winners from past AFA) would then vote in an Online Balloting System where it would be counted, tallied and kept confidential until the day of the AFA by a reputable firm of certified public accountants.

== Award categories ==
- Best Film
- Best Director
- Best Actor
- Best Actress
- Best Screenplay
- Best Supporting Actor: since 2008
- Best Supporting Actress: since 2008
- Best New Director: since 2018
- Best Newcomer: since 2009
- Best Cinematographer ^{*}
- Best Production Designer ^{*}
- Best Composer ^{*}
- Best Editor ^{*}
- Best Visual Effects
- Best Costume Designer ^{*}: since 2010

=== Special awards ===
These special awards are not always presented on a consistent annual basis. The Society chooses the special awards to be given for a certain year.

- Asian Film Award for Excellence in Scholarship in Asian Cinema
- Asian Film Award for Outstanding Contribution to Asian Cinema ^{*}
- Nielsen Box Office Star of Asia Award ^{*}
- Lifetime Achievement Award: since 2008
- The Edward Yang New Talent Award: since 2008
- The Asian Film Award for Top-Grossing Film Director: since 2009
- The Asian Film Award for Top-Grossing Asian Film: since 2011
- Award for the Promotion of Asian Cinema: since 2011
- Excellence in Asian Cinema Award: since 2013
- The Next Generation Award: since 2016

=== People's Choice awards ===
- People's Choice for the Best Asian Film: 2009 (defunct)
- People's Choice for Best Actor ^{*}: since 2010
- People's Choice for Best Actress ^{*}: since 2010

^* The asterisk indicates the awards that were renamed for a certain Asian Film Awards Presentation Ceremony. Their first and original names are used in this list.

== Major award winners ==
| Year | Best Film | Best Director | Best Actor | Best Actress | Best Supporting Actor | Best Supporting Actress | Best New Director |
|---|---|---|---|---|---|---|---|
| 2007 1st | (South Korea) The Host | (China) Jia Zhangke for Still Life | (South Korea) Song Kang-ho for The Host | (Japan) Miki Nakatani for Memories of Matsuko | No award | No award | No award |
| 2008 2nd | (South Korea) Secret Sunshine | (South Korea) Lee Chang-dong for Secret Sunshine | (Hong Kong) Tony Leung for Lust, Caution | (South Korea) Jeon Do-yeon for Secret Sunshine | (China) Sun Honglei for Mongol | (China) Joan Chen for The Sun Also Rises | No award |
| 2009 3rd | (Japan) Tokyo Sonata | (Japan) Hirokazu Kore-eda for Still Walking | (Japan) Masahiro Motoki for Departures | (China) Zhou Xun for The Equation of Love and Death | (South Korea) Jung Woo-sung for The Good, the Bad, the Weird | (Philippines) Gina Pareño for Service | No award |
| 2010 4th | (South Korea) Mother | (China) Lu Chuan for City of Life and Death | (China) Wang Xueqi for Bodyguards and Assassins | (South Korea) Kim Hye-ja for Mother | (Hong Kong) Nicholas Tse for Bodyguards and Assassins | (Hong Kong) Kara Hui for At the End of Daybreak | No award |
| 2011 5th | (Thailand) Uncle Boonmee Who Can Recall His Past Lives | (South Korea) Lee Chang-dong for Poetry | (South Korea) Ha Jung-woo for The Yellow Sea | (China) Xu Fan for Aftershock | (Hong Kong) Sammo Hung for Ip Man 2 | (South Korea) Youn Yuh-jung for The Housemaid | No award |
| 2012 6th | (Iran) A Separation | (Iran) Asghar Farhadi for A Separation | (Indonesia) Donny Damara for Lovely Man | (Hong Kong) Deanie Ip for A Simple Life | (Taiwan) Lawrence Ko for Jump Ashin! | (Philippines) Shamaine Buencamino for Niño | No award |
| 2013 7th | (China) Mystery | (Japan) Takeshi Kitano for Outrage Beyond | (Philippines) Eddie Garcia for Bwakaw | (Philippines) Nora Aunor for Thy Womb | (India) Nawazuddin Siddiqui for Talaash: The Answer Lies Within | (Japan) Makiko Watanabe for Capturing Dad | No award |
| 2014 8th | (Hong Kong) (China) The Grandmaster | (Hong Kong) Wong Kar-wai for The Grandmaster | (India) Irrfan Khan for The Lunchbox | (China) Zhang Ziyi for The Grandmaster | (China) Huang Bo; No Man's Land | (Singapore) Yeo Yann Yann for Ilo Ilo | No award |
| 2015 9th | (China) Blind Massage | (Hong Kong) Ann Hui for The Golden Era | (China) Liao Fan for Black Coal, Thin Ice | (South Korea) Bae Doona for A Girl at My Door | (China) Wang Zhiwen; The Golden Era | (Japan) Ikewaki Chizuru for The Light Shines Only There | No award |
| 2016 10th | (Taiwan) (China) (Hong Kong) The Assassin | (Taiwan) Hou Hsiao-hsien for The Assassin | (South Korea) Lee Byung-hun for Inside Men | (Taiwan) Shu Qi for The Assassin | (Japan) Asano Tadanobu forJourney to the Shore | (China) Zhou Yun for The Assassin | No award |
| 2017 11th | (China) I Am Not Madame Bovary | (South Korea) Na Hong-jin for The Wailing | (Japan) Asano Tadanobu for Harmonium | (China) Fan Bingbing for I Am Not Madame Bovary | (Hong Kong) Lam Suet for Trivisa | (South Korea) Moon So-ri for The Handmaiden | No award |
| 2018 12th | (China) Youth | (Japan) Yuya Ishii for The Tokyo Night Sky Is Always the Densest Shade of Blue | (Hong Kong) Louis Koo for Paradox | (Taiwan) Sylvia Chang for Love Education | (South Korea) Yang Ik-june for Wilderness | (China) Zhang Yuqi for Legend of the Demon Cat | (China) Dong Yue for The Looming Storm |
| 2019 13th | (Japan) Shoplifters | (South Korea) Lee Chang-dong for Burning | (Japan) Kōji Yakusho for The Blood of Wolves | (Russia) (Kazakhstan) Samal Yeslyamova for Ayka | (China) Zhang Yu for Dying to Survive | (Hong Kong) Kara Hui for Tracey | (Hong Kong) Oliver Chan for Still Human |
| 2020 14th | (South Korea) Parasite | (China) Wang Xiaoshuai for So Long, My Son | (South Korea) Lee Byung-hun for The Man Standing Next | (China) Zhou Dongyu for Better Days | (Japan) Ryo Kase for To the Ends of the Earth | (Taiwan) Ko Shu-chin for A Sun | (Japan) Hikari for 37 Seconds |
| 2021 15th | (Japan) Wife of a Spy | (China) Zhang Yimou for One Second | (South Korea) Yoo Ah-in for Voice of Silence | (Japan) Yū Aoi for Wife of a Spy | (South Korea) Kim Hyun-bin for The Silent Forest | (Japan) Aju Makita for True Mothers | (South Korea) Hong Eui-jeong for Voice of Silence |
| 2022 16th | (Japan) Drive My Car | (Japan) Hirokazu Kore-eda for Broker | (Hong Kong) Tony Leung Chiu-wai for Where the Wind Blows | (China) Tang Wei for Decision to Leave | (Japan) Hio Miyazawa for Egoist | (South Korea) Kim So-jin for Emergency Declaration | (China) Jigme Trinley for One and Four |
| 2023 17th | (Japan) Evil Does Not Exist | (Japan) Hirokazu Kore-eda for Monster | (Japan) Koji Yakusho for Perfect Days | (China) Jiang Qinqin for Dwelling by the West Lake | (South Korea) Park Hoon for 12.12: The Day | (Hong Kong) Rachel Leung for In Broad Daylight | (Hong Kong) Nick Cheuk for Time Still Turns the Pages |
| 2024 18th | (India) (France) (Netherlands) (Luxembourg) All We Imagine as Light | (Japan) Daihachi Yoshida for Teki Cometh | (Hong Kong) Sean Lau for Papa | (India) Shahana Goswami for Santosh | (Taiwan) Lee Kang-sheng for Stranger Eyes | (Taiwan) Yang Kuei-mei for Yen and Ai-Lee | (India) Sandhya Suri for Santosh |

== Presentation ceremonies ==
- 2021: The 15th edition of the awards presentation hosted by actress Kim Gyu-ri and broadcaster Lee Seung-guk was held on 8 October 2021 in Busan at Haeundae. 36 films from 8 Asian regions competed for 16 awards. Director Kiyoshi Kurosawa's Wife of a Spy (2020) won the best picture award at the ceremony streamed live on YouTube and Naver.
- 2023: The 16th edition of the awards presentation hosted by Hong Kong-born Canadian actress Grace Chan and actor Sammy Leung was held on 12 March 2023 at Hong Kong Jockey Club Auditorium in Hong Kong Palace Museum. 30 films from 22 regions and countries have been shortlisted for 81 nominations. Drive My Car by Ryusuke Hamaguchi won the best film award and best direction was awarded to Hirokazu Kore-eda for Broker, whereas Tang Wei's performance in Decision to Leave got her the best actress award. Tony Leung Chiu-wai, a Hong Kong actor and singer, was presented with Asian Film Contribution Award for his contribution to the Asian cinema and the best actor award for his performance in Where the Wind Blows.

== See also ==
- Hong Kong International Film Festival
- 17th Asian Film Awards
