= Sandhya Suri =

British-Indian film director

- Born: England
- Occupation: Filmmaker
- Years active: 2005–present
- Notable work: Santosh

Sandhya Suri is a British-Indian film director and documentarian. She is known for her debut feature film Santosh (2024), which she wrote and directed.

== Early life and education ==
Sandhya Suri was born in England and raised in Darlington. Her father, Yash Pal Suri, had emigrated from India to work as a doctor at a hospital in Teesside.

After earning a degree in mathematics, Suri worked as a teacher in Japan. Her experiences documenting this period on camera inspired her to study documentary filmmaking at the National Film and Television School in Buckinghamshire.

== Career ==
In 2005, Suri released the documentary I for India, detailing her father's experiences as a 20th-century Indian immigrant in the United Kingdom, based on his own tape recordings. I for India was nominated for the Grand Jury Prize at the 2006 Sundance Film Festival.

Suri's second film, the silent 2018 documentary Around India with a Movie Camera, used archival British Film Institute footage to explore life in British India. That same year, Suri released the narrative short film The Field, which was nominated for the BAFTA Award for Best Short Film in 2019.

Suri's narrative feature debut, Santosh was selected to screen in the Un Certain Regard portion of the 2024 Cannes Film Festival. She first began work on Santosh in 2016 when she was accepted to the Sundance Institute Director's Lab.

In 2026, Suri was selected as president of Documentary Competition (Grierson Award) jury at the 2026 BFI London Film Festival.

== Filmography ==
Year	Title	Notes	Ref.
2005	I for India	Documentary	
2018	Around India with a Movie Camera	Documentary	
2018	The Field	Short film	
2024	Santosh	—N/a	

== Awards and nominations ==
Year	Award	Category	Nominated work	Result	Ref.
2006	Sundance Film Festival	Grand Jury Prize	I for India	Nominated	
2018	British Independent Film Awards	Best Short Film	The Field	Nominated	
2018	London Film Festival	Best Short Film	The Field	Nominated	
2018	Toronto International Film Festival	Best International Short Film	The Field	Won	
2019	BAFTA Film Awards	Best Short Film	The Field	Nominated	
2019	Melbourne International Film Festival	Best Fiction Short Film	The Field	Won	
2019	Sundance Film Festival	Grand Jury Prize for Best Short Film	The Field	Nominated	
2024	Cannes Film Festival	Un Certain Regard	Santosh	Nominated	
