= Legend of the Demon Cat =

2017 Chinese-Japanese-Hong Kong film by Chen Kaige

- Theatrical release poster

Chinese name
- Traditional Chinese: 妖貓傳
- Simplified Chinese: 妖猫传
- Literal meaning: Kūkai -KU-KAI- The Mystery of The Beautiful Queen
- Hanyu Pinyin: Yāomāo chuán
- Jyutping: Jiu¹ maau¹ cyun⁴

Japanese name
- Kanji: 空海 -KU-KAI- 美しき王妃の謎
- Romanization: Kūkai utsukushiki ōhi no nazo
- Directed by: Chen Kaige
- Screenplay by: Chen Kaige; Wang Hui-ling
- Based on: Shamon kūkai tō no kuni nite oni to utage su (沙門空海唐の国にて鬼と宴す; lit. 'Feast with A Demon In The Country of Shamon Kukai Tang') by Baku Yumemakura
- Produced by: Kao Shirley
- Starring: Huang Xuan; Shōta Sometani
- Cinematography: Cao Yu
- Edited by: Li Dianshi
- Music by: Klaus Badelt; Anne-Kathrin Dern; Misha Segal
- Production companies: New Classics Media; Kadokawa; Emperor Motion Pictures; Shengkai Film
- Distributed by: Emperor Motion Pictures, Moonstone Entertainment (present); QC Media (China); Toho, Kadokawa (Japan); Parkway Management (Hong Kong)
- Release dates: 22 December 2017 (China); 11 January 2018 (Hong Kong); 24 February 2018 (Japan)
- Running time: 129 minutes
- Countries: China; Japan; Hong Kong
- Languages: Mandarin; Japanese
- Budget: CN¥170 million
- Box office: CN¥530 million

Legend of the Demon Cat (simplified Chinese: 妖猫传; traditional Chinese: 妖貓傳; pinyin: Yāomāo chuán) is a Chinese-Japanese fantasy mystery film directed by Chen Kaige, based on the Japanese novel series by Baku Yumemakura. The film, a surreal reimagining of the tragic romance between Emperor Xuanzong and Lady Yang, stars Huang Xuan as Bai Letian and Shota Sometani as Kūkai, who form an investigative partnership to uncover the truth behind the legendary consort’s death during the An Lushan Rebellion against the Tang dynasty. It premiered in China on December 22, 2017.

== Plot ==
The film opens in AD 805 in Chang’an, the capital of the Tang Empire, where Chunqin, the wife of imperial guard commander Chen Yunqiao, encounters a mysterious talking black cat in her garden while eating melons. In exchange for sharing her fruit, the cat rewards her with a pot of coins, which she later shows to her husband.

Meanwhile, Kūkai, a Japanese monk serving as a Kentōshi in Chang’an, is summoned to the imperial palace to perform an exorcism on Emperor Dezong, but the emperor suddenly dies amid the sound of a cat’s wail. Court scribe Bai Letian, whose official duty is to record the emperor’s daily conduct, is ordered to attribute the death to illness.

As Kūkai and Bai leave the palace together, Kūkai remarks that he sensed the presence of a cat. Moments later, they discover a small wooden tablet that rises on its own and bears the message: “The emperor is dead. Li Song is next,” threatening the life of the crown prince.

Bai initially doubts Kūkai’s suggestion that the terrors are linked to a cat, having never seen one in the palace during his three years of service. That night, however, while Bai secretly retrieves a brocade pouch containing a lock of Lady Yang’s hair from Emperor Xuanzong’s treasury, in an effort to verify the emperor's everlasting sorrow over his lost consort, palace guards are distracted by the sudden appearance of a cat, allowing him to narrowly escape.

Impressed by Kūkai’s insight, Bai befriends him; Kūkai’s dry wit contrasts with Bai’s lively, straightforward character. Bai shares his ambition to achieve literary immortality by composing an epic poem, Song of Everlasting Sorrow, about the love between Emperor Xuanzong and Lady Yang. Kūkai, in turn, reveals he came to China in the hope of studying under Huiguo, the abbot of the Great Qinglong Temple, but he has been denied entry. Wandering through the bustling streets of Chang’an, the pair are drawn to a street magician’s illusion performance, before encountering a group of imperial guards led by Chen Yunqiao, who, enriched by the cat’s gift, is treating his men to a brothel.

Having heard rumors of a talking cat at Chen’s home, Bai and Kūkai decide to follow him to the brothel, only to witness the demon cat manifest itself, violently attacking the guards and declaring to Chen that “debts must be paid.” The following night, the cat visits Chen’s home again and possesses Chunqin. Chen flees in terror to the brothel he frequents, where he encounters Kūkai performing an exorcism on a courtesan who has fallen into a coma after drinking Chen’s wine the previous night, apparently cursed in an attempt to target Chen. Chen immediately begs Kūkai for help with Chunqin.

Arriving at Chen’s house, Bai and Kūkai witness an apparition of Chunqin walking along the roof, reciting a poem by Li Bai praising the beauty of Lady Yang. Seeking to understand its significance, the two consult the imperial archives and learn that the poem was composed at the Feast of Supreme Joy, Lady Yang’s birthday banquet in AD 755.

When they return to Chen’s residence again, an apparition of Lady Yang appears beneath a flowering tree before dissolving, revealing the house in a state of ruin. Inside, the possessed Chunqin speaks on behalf of the cat, dismissing both Li's poem and Bai's draft of Song of Everlasting Sorrow as false. Through Chunqin, the cat reveals that it was Emperor Xuanzong’s pet and had been present at the Feast of Supreme Joy, where it witnessed firsthand that Li's poem was written before the poet ever met Lady Yang. The cat further explains that it seeks revenge against the Tang royal house and the Chen family because it was buried alive on Emperor Xuanzong’s orders, an act carried out by Chen Yunqiao’s father, Chen Xuanli. According to the cat, it escaped the burial and later arrived at Chen’s household in pursuit of vengeance, where it accidentally died after consuming poisoned fish. Its unresolved resentment prevented its spirit from dissipating, transforming it into a demon. After the illusory ruins generated by the cat dissolve, Bai and Kūkai discover the cat’s desiccated carcass at Chen's house, just as the cat had described.

Continuing its revenge, the demon cat later possesses Chen Yunqiao to kill Chunqin, and ultimately drives Chen into madness. Sensing that the demon cat’s vendetta may have stemmed from the death of Lady Yang, Bai and Kūkai interview her former lady-in-waiting, now elderly. She recounts that Gao Lishi, Xuanzong’s longtime close eunuch attendant, strangled Lady Yang on the emperor's orders during the Mawei Station Mutiny in AD 756, which occurred as the imperial court fled Chang’an for Chengdu during the An Lushan Rebellion. Though she did not witness the strangling, she wove the white silk used for it. Shortly after Bai and Kūkai depart, the demon cat kills the woman for her part in the death of Lady Yang.

The pair next visit the former Chang’an residence of Abe no Nakamaro, a deceased Japanese Kentōshi and a witness to the mutiny, who harbored a great admiration for Lady Yang. They obtain his diary from his widow and learn that during the mutiny, imperial guards led by Chen Xuanli blamed the rebellion on the consort, believing that her beauty had enticed An Lushan and fueled his ambitions. At Mawei Station, the mutinous guards surrounded the emperor and the consort and executed members of her family, including her cousin Yang Guozhong, in order to intimidate Xuanzong into consenting to her death. From Xuanzong’s perspective, however, he could neither surrender his consort to the troops nor force her to commit suicide without fatally undermining his authority as emperor. Nor could she flee abroad, as Abe no Nakamaro had proposed taking her to Japan, since any discovery of such an attempt would have provoked the soldiers and likewise doomed the emperor. As Kūkai observes, “For the sake of the emperor's dignity and safety, she could neither live nor die.”

The emperor devised a third course of action with the aid of a great magician known as Yellow Crane, employing the so-called “Immortal Path,” an acupuncture technique purported to induce a death-like hibernation. Xuanzong assured Lady Yang that she would be revived once the crisis had passed. Although she never believed in the plausibility of the technique, Lady Yang understood the emperor’s predicament and consented to the plan. Before Yellow Crane needled her into a death-like sleep, she entrusted the emperor with a pouch containing a lock of her hair, which, as Bai discovers, Xuanzong kept in the inner sanctum of his treasury for the rest of his life. Unbeknownst to her, the technique merely sealed her breathing for two days. The plan was not a rescue, but to spare the emperor, or anyone else, from the burden of killing her.

To appease the soldiers, they were told that Gao Lishi had strangled Lady Yang on his own initiative in a desperate attempt to shield the emperor, and Xuanzong staged the eunuch's punishment before the troops. After the unconscious consort was examined by Chen Xuanli and declared dead, her body was sealed in a coffin and transported to a tomb. Xuanzong placed his pet cat inside the tomb with her, effectively burying both alive, and later ordered the execution of all who knew the tomb’s location, including Abe no Nakamaro. Lady Yang awoke inside the coffin and died a second, agonizing death.

Following clues in the diary, Bai and Kūkai locate Lady Yang’s tomb, but the coffin is empty. The demon cat appears and is identified by Kūkai as Bai Long, one of Yellow Crane's two disciples known as the “Flying Cranes” for their signature performance in which they transformed into two white cranes. The other half, Dan Long, is revealed to be the street magician Bai and Kūkai encountered before.

Decades ago, the “Flying Cranes” were among those who had been present at Lady Yang’s entombment and were nearly purged by the emperor in its aftermath. After escaping with their lives, they returned to the tomb and retrieved her body. Dan Long, Yellow Crane’s biological son, then confessed to his partner that he knowingly participated in the “Immortal Path” scheme. Although he secretly poisoned Lady Yang’s wine in an attempt to spare her suffering, it did not kill her, and she later awoke nonetheless. Bai Long, Yellow Crane’s adopted son, had formed a deep attachment to Lady Yang after she revealed that she, like him, was also raised by an uncle. Viewing Dan Long’s actions as a betrayal, Bai Long parted ways with him and refused to abandon Lady Yang’s body, ultimately sacrificing his own body to preserve hers from decay. His spirit fused with the emperor’s cat, inheriting its memories, including Lady Yang’s final awakening and screams within the coffin. Consumed by grief and rage, the cat returned to Chang’an and gouged out the eyes of the aged Xuanzong, who thereafter claimed that he had gone blind from weeping for Lady Yang.

Dan Long invites Bai, Kūkai, and the cat to the ruins of the site where the Feast of Supreme Joy was once held. Using illusion, he recreates the splendor of the banquet at which he and Bai Long first met Lady Yang. Dan Long reveals that after Bai Long sacrificed his body to preserve Lady Yang’s, he retrieved Bai Long’s body and preserved it in an ice cave, mirroring Bai Long’s devotion. The two well-preserved bodies now lie side by side. Bai Long initially attempts to attack Dan Long, but is moved when Dan Long tells him that he never left him. Kūkai tells the cat that Lady Yang’s spirit is no longer bound to the preserved body it has guarded for so long. Exhausted and shattered, the cat struggles to climb toward the platform where her body rests but collapses. A white crane, Bai Long’s former illusory form from his duet with Dan Long, rises and flies away. The cat dies amid the overgrown weeds of the former banquet grounds, and Kūkai places its body beside Lady Yang's.

In the final scenes, Bai and Kūkai walk once again through the bustling streets of Chang’an. Bai declares that he will not revise his Song of Everlasting Sorrow, believing that while its account may not be factually true, its emotional truth remains. He attributes the poem’s true authorship to Bai Long. Kūkai then revisits the Great Qinglong Temple to fulfill his Japanese master’s instruction to study Tantric Teachings there in pursuit of a way to live without sorrow. This time, the temple gates open to him, and he is received by Dan Long, who is revealed to be the abbot, Huiguo, whom Kūkai asks whether he has discovered such a path free from sorrow. The film closes with Bai asleep in his quarters, where his earlier drawing of Lady Yang is now shown with a black cat in her arms.

== Cast ==
- Huang Xuan as Bai Letian
- Shōta Sometani as Kūkai
- Kitty Zhang as Chunqin
- Qin Hao as Chen Yunqiao
- Hiroshi Abe as Abe no Nakamaro
- Keiko Matsuzaka as Bai Ling
- Liu Haoran as Bai Long (White Dragon)
- Oho Ou as The young Dan Long (Red Dragon)
- Zhang Tianai as Yulian
- Zhang Luyi as Emperor Xuanzong of Tang
- Sandrine Pinna as Lady Yang
- Tian Yu as Gao Lishi
- Liu Peiqi as Huang He (Yellow Crane)
- Xin Baiqing as Li Bai
- Cheng Taisheng as The Old Dan Long
- Mason Lee as The Chamberlain
- Qin Yi as Old Lady-in-waiting
- Shōhei Hino as Kūkai's Teacher

== Production ==
A set costing US$200 million and five years to create was constructed for the film. It was reported that the set will be turned into a theme park.

== Awards and nominations ==
Awards	Category	Recipient	Result	Ref.
25th Beijing College Student Film Festival	Best Director	Chen Kaige	Nominated	
25th Beijing College Student Film Festival	Best Visual Effects	—N/a	Won	
23rd Huading Awards	Best Director	Chen Kaige	Nominated	
23rd Huading Awards	Best Supporting Actress	Sandrine Pinna	Won	
9th China Film Director's Guild Awards	Best Film	Legend of the Demon Cat	Nominated	
9th China Film Director's Guild Awards	Best Director	Chen Kaige	Nominated	
12th Asian Film Awards	Best Director	Chen Kaige	Nominated	
12th Asian Film Awards	Best Supporting Actress	Kitty Zhang	Won	
12th Asian Film Awards	Best Cinematography	Cao Yu	Nominated	
12th Asian Film Awards	Best Costume Design	Chen Tongxun	Won	
12th Asian Film Awards	Best Production Design	Tu Nan and Lu Wei	Won	
12th Asian Film Awards	Best Visual Effects	Ishi Norio	Won	

== See also ==
- Chang hen ge (poem)
