= Only the River Flows =

2023 Chinese drama film

- Chinese theatrical release poster

Chinese name
- Simplified Chinese: 河边的错误
- Traditional Chinese: 河邊的錯誤
Transcriptions
Standard Mandarin
- Hanyu Pinyin: Hébiān de cuòwù
- Directed by: Wei Shujun
- Screenplay by: Kang Chunlei; Wei Shujun
- Based on: Mistakes by the River by Yu Hua
- Produced by: Tang Xiaohui; Huang Xufeng; Li Chan; Shen Yang
- Starring: Zhu Yilong; Chloe Maayan; Hou Tianlai; Tong Linkai
- Cinematography: Zhiyuan Chengma
- Edited by: Mattieu Laclau
- Production company: KXKH Film
- Distributed by: Lian Ray Pictures
- Release dates: May 20, 2023 (Cannes); October 21, 2023 (China)
- Running time: 102 minutes
- Country: China
- Language: Mandarin
- Box office: $41.4 million

Only the River Flows (simplified Chinese: 河边的错误; traditional Chinese: 河邊的錯誤; pinyin: Hébiān de cuòwù) is a 2023 Chinese neo-noir crime drama film directed by Wei Shujun, who co-wrote the screenplay with Kang Chunlei based on Yu Hua's short novel Mistakes by the River. The film stars Zhu Yilong as a police chief investigating a series of murders in a riverside town in rural China in the 1990s.

The film was selected to compete in the Un Certain Regard section of the 76th Cannes Film Festival. It was released theatrically in China on October 21, 2023. As of November 7, the total box office of the film is 301 million RMB, placing it among China's highest-grossing independent films.

== Plot ==
In 1995, police captain Ma Zhe investigates the murder of an elderly woman called Granny Four in a small riverside town in rural China. The main suspect is a mentally ill drifter she had adopted, known only as "the madman." During the investigation, Ma Zhe discovers a cassette tape containing emotional recordings between two secret lovers, Qian Ling and Wang Hong. The tape leads the police into hidden relationships, poetry gatherings, and clues about a mysterious woman with long wavy hair seen near the crime scene. Before the mystery is solved, Wang Hong is murdered in the same way as Granny Four, making the case more complicated.

As pressure from police superiors grows, Ma Zhe investigates several suspects, including Xu Liang, a troubled hairdresser with a criminal past who strangely keeps asking the police to arrest him. Meanwhile, the madman is institutionalized, and the authorities want the case closed quickly. Ma Zhe, however, feels the evidence does not fully fit together. At the same time, his personal life deteriorates. His wife's pregnancy may involve a genetic disorder in the baby, causing emotional conflict between them. Ma Zhe becomes increasingly obsessed, exhausted, and mentally unstable as he replays the cassette tapes and tries to understand the hidden connections between the murders.

The climax happens after the madman escapes from a psychiatric hospital and kills the young boy who first found Granny Four's body. During a final manhunt near an abandoned temple, Ma Zhe shoots and kills the madman. But afterward, he tells his chief that he believes the madman intentionally arranged events so that Ma Zhe himself would become the one to kill him. Despite Ma Zhe's doubts and confusion, the police officially declare the case solved, praise him as a hero, and award him a merit honor. The ending leaves the truth uncertain, with Ma Zhe psychologically damaged and unable to separate reality, coincidence, institutional pressure, and fate.

== Cast ==
- Zhu Yilong as Ma Zhe
- Chloe Maayan as Bai Jie
- Hou Tianlai as the Chief of Police
- Tong Linkai as Xie

== Production ==
Just before principal photography, the COVID-19 pandemic in China was surging again, and the entire cast and crew was put on lockdown. The team had around 45 days of preparation and approximately 45 days of shooting, and had to pause for two days when Wei and Zhu tested positive.

Principal photography began in Nanfeng, Jiangxi, on 19 December 2022, and wrapped in early February 2023. "The film was shot mostly in chronological order as same as in the script".

Zhu Yilong gained weight during the preparation to give the character a heavyset appearance from overwork. He lost 55 pounds during the 45 days of shooting as the shooting went on.

Almost the entire film was shot on 16 mm film.

Speaking to Amy Hawkins of The Guardian, Wei said of Yu's book the following: "A detective novel is supposed to be based on rationality and logic, [but in Mistakes by the River there is a] different understanding of rationality … we're thinking about the limits of rationality. I found that very appealing."

== Release ==
=== World premiere ===
The film was selected to compete in the Un Certain Regard section of the 76th Cannes Film Festival, where it premiered on May 20, 2023.

=== Film festival entries ===
Film festival	Date	Area	Ref
76th Cannes Film Festival: Un Certain Regard	May 20, 2023	France	
40th Jerusalem Film Festival: International Competition	July 13, 2023	Israel	
2023 New Zealand International Film Festival	July 19, 2023	New Zealand	
2023 Darwin International Film Festival	September 14, 2023	Australia	
40th Manaki Brothers – International Cinematographers' Film Festival	September 23, 2023	Macedonia	
29th Athens International Film Festival	September 27, 2023	Greece	
42nd Vancouver International Film Festival: Panorama	September 28, 2023	Canada	
28th Busan International Film Festival: A Window on Asian Cinema	October 4, 2023	South Korea	
67th BFI London Film Festival	October 4, 2023	England	
BE2CAN 2023	October 4, 2023	Czech Republic	
7th Pingyao International Film Festival	October 11, 2023	China	
59th Chicago International Film Festival	October 11, 2023	United States	
Clam, The International Social Film Festival of Catalonia	October 12, 2023	Spain	
24th Newport Beach Film Fest: International Spotlights	October 13, 2023	United States	
Adelaide Film Festival	October 18, 2023	Australia	
24th Bergen International Film Festival	October 18, 2023	Norway	
61st Vienna International Film Festival	October 19, 2023	Austria	
47th São Paulo International Film Festival: International Perspective	October 19, 2023	Brazil	
14th Les Films de Cannes à Bucarest	October 20, 2023	Romania	
Asian Film Festival Barcelona 2023: Official Panorama Section	October 25, 2023	Spain	
34th Stockholm International Film Festival: Competition	November 8, 2023	Sweden	
The International Film Festival of the Art of Cinematography Camerimage: Contemporary World Cinema	November 11, 2023	Poland	
33rd Films from the South Festival: Spotlight China	November 11, 2023	Norway	
72th International Filmfestival Mannheim-Heidelberg	November 16, 2023	Germany	
QCinema International Film Festival	November 17, 2023	Philippines	
Tokyo Filmex 2023	November 19, 2023	Japan	

=== Theatrical release ===
The film has been licensed for theatrical and home release in Northern America by KimStim and in the United Kingdom and Ireland by Picturehouse Entertainment.

Date	Area
October 21, 2023	China
November 2, 2023	Australia

== Reception ==
=== Critical response ===
On the review aggregator website Rotten Tomatoes, Only the River Flows holds an approval rating of 89%.

Screen Daily stated "while ostensibly a noir, is a reminder of the alternative narrative perspectives and cinematic sophistication that have moved cinema forward in the past. Production design is pleasing and the cinematography is genuinely star-making". The Hollywood Reporter stated "Shame and secrecy seem to be the guiding principles at a time, and in a place, where obedience counted most, and Wei keenly observes how adhering to social norms could drive some people over the edge. Even if Ma Zhe winds up catching the killer, or at least the guy he believes the killer to be, it's a bitter victory, a source of private anguish despite his public triumph." Asia Movie Pulse stated "particularly the friction rising from the fact that their upcoming child will be born with a disorder. Ma Zhe repeatedly states that they are supposed to abort it, but his wife insists that 'her body, her decision', in a comment that echoes quite intently even today, but even more in the one-child policy in 90's China. The way this issue and the way the case unfolds shed light to the protagonist's character is probably the most appealing aspect of the movie." AwardsWatch also reviewed in favor on performance and cinematography after BFI London Film Festival by stating "Yilong gives a subtly excellent performance backed by an all-convincing ensemble that brings to life Shujun's murky, yet refined vision." "The beautifully dark look of Chengma Zhiyuan's 16mm cinematography gives the film a non-contemporary feel."

=== Accolades ===
Award / Film Festival	Date of ceremony	Category	Recipient(s)	Result
Cannes Film Festival	May 26, 2023	Un Certain Regard	Only the River Flows	Nominated
Jerusalem Film Festival	July 20, 2023	International Competition	Only the River Flows	Nominated
Manaki Brothers – International Cinematographers' Film Festival	September 29, 2023	Official Selection: Silver Camera 300	Chengma Zhiyuan	Won
Pingyao International Film Festival	October 16, 2023	Fei Mu Awards: Best Film	Only the River Flows	Won
Chicago International Film Festival	October 22, 2023	International Competition	Only the River Flows	Nominated
Asian Film Festival Barcelona	November 6, 2023	Panorama: Best Film	Only the River Flows	Won
Stockholm International Film Festival	November 17, 2023	Stockholm Competition	Only the River Flows	Nominated
Tokyo Filmex 2023	November 26, 2023	Competition Grand Prize	Only the River Flows	Nominated
