= Yang Lina =

Yang Lina may refer to:

- Yang Lina (actress) (1963-2010), Singaporean actress
- Yang Lina (director) (born 1972), Chinese director
- Yang Lina (footballer) (born 1994), Chinese footballer
