= Xi Meijuan =

Chinese actress

- 奚美娟
- Born: 20 April 1955 (age 71); Chuansha County, Jiangsu, China
- Education: Shanghai Theatre Academy
- Occupation: Actress
- Years active: 1988–present
- Spouse: Zhou Yemang (m. 1985; div. 1994)
- Children: 1
- Awards: Golden Rooster Awards – Best Actress; 1991 Leave Women the Truth; 2022 Song of Spring

Xi Meijuan (Chinese: 奚美娟; pinyin: Xī Měijuān) is a Chinese film, television and stage actress. She is a member of the 12th National People's Congress.

== Biography ==
Xi was born into a worker's family in Chuansha County, Jiangsu (now Pudong New Area, Shanghai) on 20 April 1955. In 1973, she enrolled at Shanghai Theatre Academy, where she majored in the Performance Department.

== Family ==
After graduating from Shanghai Theatre Academy, Xi was assigned to work at Shanghai People's Art Theatre. In 1982, Zhou Yemang also came to work at Shanghai People's Art Theatre, and the two got married in 1985. Shortly after marriage, Zhou obtained a three-year study abroad spot in Canada, causing a rift in their marital relationship. In 1990, Xi had an unexpected miscarriage after becoming pregnant. At the age of 39, Xi gave birth to a son named Xi Nan (奚男) during her second pregnancy. Shortly thereafter, the two divorced, and Zhou remarried "Qiong Girl" Wang Zhixia (“琼女郎”王之夏).

== Filmography ==
=== Film ===
Year	Title	Director	Role	Notes
1990	Leave Women the Truth	Wu Zhennian	Wang Yujuan	Golden Rooster Award for Best Actress
1992	Jiang Zhu Ying	Song Jiangbo	Lu Changqin	Beijing College Student Film Festival Jury Award for Best Actress; Golden Phoenix Award Society Award
1993	The Joy Luck Club	Wayne Wang	Wu Jingmei	
1994	First Attraction	Bao Zhifang	Ye Lin	
1995	The Strangers in Beijing	He Qun	Teng Boju	
1996	A Tree	Zhou Youchao	Zhu Zhu	Golden Phoenix Award Society Award; Toshkent International Film Festival Best Actress; Nominated - Golden Rooster Award for Best Actress
2000	Full Moom Tonight	Chen Li	Lingyu	Huabiao Award for Outstanding Actress; Shanghai Film Critics Award for Best Actress
2010	Under the Hawthorn Tree	Zhang Yimou	Jingqiu's mother	
2015	The White Lie			
2017	Eternal Wave	Billy Chung	Liang Dong's mother	
2019	For Love with You			
2022	Song of Spring	Yang Lina	Daughter who suffers from Alzheimer's disease	Golden Rooster Award for Best Actress; China Film Director's Guild Award for Best Actress

=== Television ===
Year	Title	Chinese title	Director	Role	Notes/Ref.
1996	Er Nv Qing Chang	儿女情长	Shi Xiaohua	Tong Jianju	Golden Eagle Award for Best Supporting Actress (China)
2003	Red Carnation	红色康乃馨	Bao Fuming	Lan Sihong	Feitian Award for Outstanding Actress
2004	Dealer	坐庄	Qi Jian	Xue Shuyu	Golden Eagle Award's Audience's Choice for Actress
2005	Audit Report	审计报告	Gu Jinyun	Du Huiqin	
2006	Mummy	保姆	Liu Xin	Yang A Xiu	
2007	Black Triangle	黑三角	Yu Ding	Yu Huangshi	
2008	Chuncao	春草	Zheng Xiaolong	Chuncao's mother	
2008	Wang Gui and Anna	王贵和安娜	Teng Huatao	Anna's mother	
2009	Late Marriage	晚婚	Zhou Xiaowen	Xu Jiarong	
2010	The War of Moms	母亲的战争	Liu Xin	Ma's mother	
2011	Maternity Matron	月嫂	Jiang Haiyang	Ding Zhanju	
2012	To Elderly With Love	老有所依	Zhao Baogang/Lü Haozhe	Yazhi	
2013	Hot Mom	辣妈正传	Shen Yan	Fang Youqing	
2021	New Generation: Bomb Disposal Expert	我们的新时代	Zhang Ting	Liu Xishi's mother	
2022	Tianxia Changhe	天下长河	Zhang Ting	Empress Xiaozhuangwen	

Theater
Year	Title	Role	Notes
1976	The Trials of a Long Journey /万水千山	Li Fenglian	
1978	Ku Mu Feng Chun/枯木逢春	Ku Mei Zi	
1981	Salam's Witch/萨拉姆的女巫	Abigail Williams	
1986	Horse/马	Jil	
1987	China Dream/中国梦	Mingming	China Drama Golden Lion Award; Plum Blossom Prize for Outstanding Performance in a Play
1991	Those Left Behind/留守女士	Nai Chuan	Magnolia Drama Award for Outstanding Performance in a Leading Role
2003	Family/家	Ruiyu	
