= Song of Spring =

Song of Spring may refer to:

- Song of Spring (1951 film), an Italian melodrama film
- Song of Spring (2022 film), a Chinese drama film
