= Big World (film) =

2024 Chinese drama film

- Theatrical release poster
- Simplified Chinese: 小小的我
- Literal meaning: Little Me
- Hanyu Pinyin: Xiǎo xiǎo de wǒ
- Directed by: Yang Lina
- Written by: You Xiaoying
- Produced by: Isabella Yin
- Starring: Jackson Yee; Diana Lin; Jiang Qinqin; Zhou Yutong; Li Gengyou
- Cinematography: Piao Songri
- Edited by: Zhu Lin
- Music by: Takeshi Kobayashi
- Production company: Shanghai Gengxi Film
- Release dates: 2 November 2024 (Tokyo); 27 December 2024 (China)
- Running time: 131 minutes
- Country: China
- Language: Mandarin (Sichuan dialect)
- Box office: US$109.5 million

Big World (Chinese: 小小的我; pinyin: Xiǎo xiǎo de wǒ) is a 2024 Chinese coming-of-age drama film directed by Yang Lina. It follows Liu Chunhe, a young man with cerebral palsy, who overcomes challenges to fulfill his grandmother's dream. The film premiered at the 37th Tokyo International Film Festival, and was released theatrically on 27 December 2024.

== Plot ==
Liu Chunhe, who has cerebral palsy, bravely breaks free from the physical and mental constraints holding him back as he strives to find his own place in life. His grandmother, Chen Suqun, is an eccentric elderly woman who treats Chunhe as an ordinary child. Rather than simply spoiling him in a typical grandparent-grandchild relationship, she sees him as a perfect child. Her love for Chunhe is not just about care and sacrifice—she deeply understands his emotional needs. She encourages him to work and study, believing he should experience everything a normal child does, even if it means getting hurt.

However, Chen Suqun struggles to get along with her daughter, Chen Lu. She has always tried to make up for her emotional distance from Chen Lu by taking care of Chunhe. As Chunhe works to fulfill his grandmother's lifelong dream on stage, he also hopes to mend his relationship with his mother. After a transformative summer, he finally embarks on a new journey.

After meeting Yaya, Chunhe aspires to become truly independent, rather than just being Chen Lu's cherished but dependent son. He dreams of attending a distant teachers' college to become an educator, earning genuine respect and recognition from the world. In contrast, Chen Lu wishes for him to stay close to home, where she can ensure his safety and care for him in every aspect of his life.

== Cast ==
- Jackson Yee as Liu Chunhe
- Diana Lin as Chen Suqun
- Jiang Qinqin as Chen Lu
- Zhou Yutong as Yaya
- Li Gengyou as Cafe owner

== Release ==
Big World premiered and competed at the 37th Tokyo International Film Festival and was awarded the Audience Award.

On 9 December 2024, it was officially announced that the film will be released on 31 December, along with the release of a promotional poster and a trailer named "Chunhe is coming back!" On 21 December, the release date was moved up to 27 December. The last weekend of 2024 saw a remarkable boost in China's box office, with the film taking the lead by earning $28.2 million (200 million yuan). As of 8 January, the box office of the film has exceeded 600 million yuan.

=== Impact ===
After the film was launched, the production team put out a short documentary that featured individuals with cerebral palsy working in diverse roles such as chefs, delivery drivers, dancers, poets, and full-time dads. The documentary particularly resonated with those in the disabled community, receiving commendations for bringing attention to a seldom-discussed facet of Chinese society.

== Accolades ==
Year	Award	Category	Recipient(s)	Results	Ref.
2024	37th Tokyo International Film Festival	Audience Award	Big World	Won	
2025	16th China Film Director's Guild Awards	Best Actor	Jackson Yee	Won	
2025	38th Golden Rooster Awards	Best Picture	Big World	Nominated	
2025	38th Golden Rooster Awards	Best Writing	You Xiaoying	Nominated	
2025	38th Golden Rooster Awards	Best Actor	Jackson Yee	Won	
2025	38th Golden Rooster Awards	Best Supporting Actress	Jiang Qinqin	Nominated	
2025	38th Golden Rooster Awards	Best Sound Recording	Li Danfeng and Si Zhonglin	Nominated	
