= Asian Film Award for Best Supporting Actress =

Asian Film Awards

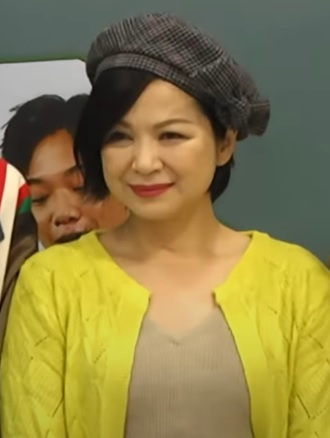
- The 2025 recipient: Yang Kuei-mei
- Awarded for: Best Performance by an Actress in a Supporting Role in Asian Cinema
- Presented by: Asian Film Awards Academy
- First award: 2008
- Most recent winner: Yang Kuei-mei; Yen and Ai-Lee (2025)
- Website: afa-academy.com

The Asian Film Award for Best Supporting Actress is presented annually by the Asian Film Awards Academy (AFAA), a non-profit organization founded by Busan International Film Festival, Hong Kong International Film Festival and Tokyo International Film Festival with the shared goal of celebrating excellence in Asian cinema. It was first presented in 2008.

== Winners and nominees ==
=== 2000s ===
Year	Recipient(s)	English title	Original title
2008	(China) Joan Chen	The Sun Also Rises	太阳照常升起
2008	(South Korea) Gong Hyo-jin	Happiness	행복 Haengbok
2008	(South Korea) Kim Hye-soo	Skeletons in the Closet	좋지 아니한가 Johji-anihanga
2008	(Thailand) Apinya Sakuljaroensuk	Ploy	พลอย
2008	(Japan) Hiroko Yakushimaru	Always: Sunset on Third Street 2	続・三丁目の夕日
2009	(Philippines) Gina Pareño	Service	Serbis
2009	(Japan) Yū Aoi	Sex Is No Laughing Matter	人のセックスを笑うな
2009	(Philippines) Jaclyn Jose	Service	Serbis
2009	(Japan) Kirin Kiki	Still Walking	歩いても 歩いても
2009	(South Korea) Kim Ji-young	Forever the Moment	우리 생애 최고의 순간

=== 2010s ===
Year	Recipient(s)	English title	Original title
2010	(Hong Kong) Kara Hui	At the End of Daybreak	心魔, Sham Moh
2010	(China) Yan Ni	Cow	斗牛
2010	(South Korea) Kim Kkot-bi	Breathless	똥파리 Ddongpari
2010	(Japan) Ryōko Hirosue	Villon's Wife	ヴィヨンの妻 〜桜桃とタンポポ〜
2010	(Japan) Sakura Ando	A Crowd of Three	ケンタとジュンとカヨちゃんの国
2011	(South Korea) Youn Yuh-jung	The Housemaid	하녀 Hanyeo
2011	(Japan) Yū Aoi	Otōto	おとうと
2011	(Japan) Yoshino Kimura	Confessions	告白
2011	(Hong Kong) Carina Lau	Let the Bullets Fly	让子弹飞
2011	(Indonesia) Shanty Paredes	Madame X	
2012	(Philippines) Shamaine Buencamino	Niño	
2012	(Taiwan) Gwei Lun-mei	Flying Swords of Dragon Gate	
2012	(Thailand) Cris Horwang	Headshot	ฝนตกขึ้นฟ้า
2012	(Japan) Hikari Mitsushima	Hara-Kiri: Death of a Samurai	一命 Ichimei
2012	(China) Yan Ni	11 Flowers	
2013	(Japan) Makiko Watanabe	Capturing Dad	チチを撮りに
2013	(South Korea) Jun Ji-hyun	The Thieves	도둑들 Dodukdeul
2013	(South Korea) Kim Hye-soo	The Thieves	도둑들 Dodukdeul
2013	(Taiwan) Lee Lieh	Together	Tian mimi
2013	(China) Qin Lan	The Last Supper	王的盛宴
2014	(Malaysia) Yeo Yann Yann	Ilo Ilo	爸妈不在家
2014	(Japan) Yū Aoi	Tokyo Family	東京家族 Tōkyō Kazoku
2014	(Taiwan) Mavis Fan	Will You Still Love Me Tomorrow?	
2014	(South Korea) Kim Young-ae	The Attorney	변호인 Byeonhoin
2014	(Japan) Fumi Nikaidō	Why Don't You Play in Hell?	地獄でなぜ悪い Jigoku de naze warui
2015	(Japan) Chizuru Ikewaki	The Light Shines Only There	そこのみにて光輝く
2015	(South Korea) Han Ye-ri	Haemoo	해무 Haemu
2015	(Japan) Haru Kuroki	The Little House	小さいおうち Chiisai Ouchi
2015	(India) Tabu	Haider	
2015	(China) Wan Qian	Paradise in Service	軍中樂園 Jun Zhong Le Yuan
2016	(China) Zhou Yun	The Assassin	刺客聶隱娘
2016	(Hong Kong) Cherry Ngan	Mojin: The Lost Legend	
2016	(South Korea) Park So-dam	The Priests	검은 사제들
2016	(Japan) Anna Tsuchiya	Gonin Saga	
2016	(Japan) Juri Ueno	The Beauty Inside	뷰티 인사이드
2017	(South Korea) Moon So-ri	The Handmaiden	아가씨
2017	(Hong Kong) Elaine Jin	Mad World	一念無明
2017	(Japan) Atsuko Maeda	The Mohican Comes Home	モヒカン故郷に帰る
2017	(India) Shabana Azmi	Neerja	नीरजा
2017	(China) Lynn Hung	See You Tomorrow	擺渡人
2018	(China) Zhang Yuqi	Legend of the Demon Cat	妖猫传
2018	(South Korea) Choi Hee-seo	Anarchist from Colony	박열
2018	(Japan) Hana Sugisaki	Blade of the Immortal	無限の住人
2018	(China) Wu Yanshu	Love Education	相爱相亲
2018	(Japan) Suzu Hirose	The Third Murder	三度目の殺人
2019	(Hong Kong) Kara Wai	Tracey	翠絲
2019	(South Korea) Jin Seo-yeon	Believer	독전
2019	(Taiwan) Ding Ning	Cities of Last Things	幸福城市
2019	(China) Xu Qing	Hidden Man	邪不压正
2019	(Japan) Mayu Matsuoka	Shoplifters	万引き家族

=== 2020s ===
Year	Recipient(s)	English title	Original title	Ref.
2020	(Taiwan) Ko Shu-chin	A Sun	陽光普照	
2020	(South Korea) Lee Jeong-eun	Parasite	기생충	
2020	(China) Zhou Ye	Better Days	少年的你	
2020	(Hong Kong) Patra Au	Twilight's Kiss	叔．叔	
2020	(Japan) Yūko Tanaka	One Night	ひとよ	
2021	(Japan) Aju Makita	True Mothers	朝が来る	
2021	(Hong Kong) Loletta Lee	Drifting	濁水漂流	
2021	(Taiwan) Hsieh Ying-xuan	Little Big Women	孤味	
2021	(China) Qin Hailu	Cliff Walkers	懸崖之上	
2021	(South Korea) Jang Yoon-ju	Three Sisters	세 자매	
2023	(South Korea) Kim So-jin	Emergency Declaration	비상선언	
2023	(Japan) Sakura Ando	A Man	ある男	
2023	(Indonesia) Laura Basuki	Before, Now & Then	Nana	
2023	(China) Yin Tao	Home Coming	万里归途	
2023	(Japan) Yuumi Kawai	Plan 75		
2024	(Hong Kong) Rachel Leung	In Broad Daylight	白日之下	
2024	(Japan) Minami Hamabe	Godzilla Minus One	ゴジラ-1.0	
2024	(Japan) Mariko Tsutsui	Last Shadow at First Light		
2024	(South Korea) Go Min-si	Smugglers	밀수	
2024	(Taiwan) Wanfang	Snow in Midsummer	五月雪	
2025	(Taiwan) Yang Kuei-mei	Yen and Ai-Lee	小雁與吳愛麗	
2025	(India) Divya Prabha	All We Imagine as Light		
2025	(Hong Kong) Maggie Li Lin Lin	All Shall Be Well	從今以後	
2025	(South Korea) Lim Ji-yeon	Revolver	리볼버	
2025	(Japan) Kumi Takiuchi	Teki Cometh	敵	

== See also ==
- Blue Dragon Film Award for Best Supporting Actress
- Golden Horse Award for Best Supporting Actress
- Hong Kong Film Award for Best Supporting Actress
- Japan Academy Film Prize for Outstanding Performance by an Actress in a Supporting Role
