= Love Education =

2017 film directed by Sylvia Chang

- Theatrical release poster
- Traditional Chinese: 相愛相親
- Simplified Chinese: 相爱相亲
- Hanyu Pinyin: Xiāng ài xiāng qīn
- Directed by: Sylvia Chang
- Written by: Sylvia Chang; You Xiaoying
- Produced by: Patricia Cheng
- Starring: Sylvia Chang; Tian Zhuangzhuang; Lang Yueting; Song Ningfeng; Wu Yanshu
- Cinematography: Mark Lee Ping-bing
- Edited by: Matthieu Laclau
- Music by: Kay Huang
- Production companies: Beijing Hairun Pictures; Dream Creek Productions
- Distributed by: Applause Entertainment (Taiwan)
- Release dates: October 21, 2017 (Busan); November 3, 2017 (China); November 17, 2017 (Taiwan)
- Running time: 120 minutes
- Countries: China; Taiwan
- Language: Mandarin
- Box office: NT$5 million (Taiwan) US$26 million (Mainland China)

Love Education is a 2017 Chinese-Taiwanese drama film directed and co-written by Sylvia Chang. It stars Chang, Tian Zhuangzhuang, Lang Yueting, Song Ningfeng, and Wu Yanshu. It focuses on three generations of women in Henan Province.

The film received critical acclaim, with many praising the screenplay and direction, as well as the performances of Wu, Tian, and Chang.

== Plot ==
Love Education is a story of family and love, involving three women of different ages. Weiwei, nearly 30, has reached the age where she is able to marry. Her love life is in danger of her past, with her work causing troubles with her mother, Huiying, unable to understand it fully. Huiying is a middle-aged teacher who is about to retire, and takes on all arrangements after her mother's death, as she and her husband, Xiaoping, depend on each other but the couple suffer from emotional miscommunication. Nana, the 90-year-old grandma who has lived alone for decades, finds her life interrupted Huiying's sudden visit, and brings up the history of a bittersweet love affair. Through the three generations of women who share different views on life and love, they must find a way to connect as they meet together.

== Cast ==
- Sylvia Chang as Qiu Huiying
- Tian Zhuangzhuang as Yin Xiaoping
- Lang Yueting as Weiwei
- Wu Yanshu as Nana
- Song Ning as A-da
- Geng Le as Lu Mingwei
- Sitar Tan as Zhu Yin
- Rene Liu
- Li Xuejian
- Wang Zhiwen

== Production ==
The city and rural scenes were filmed in Zhengzhou and Luoyang, respectively.

== Awards and nominations ==
Award	Category	Recipients	Result	Ref.
25th Beijing College Student Film Festival	Best Film	Love Education	Nominated	
25th Beijing College Student Film Festival	Jury Award	Love Education	Nominated	
25th Beijing College Student Film Festival	Best Actor	Tian Zhuangzhuang	Nominated	
25th Beijing College Student Film Festival	Best Actress	Wu Yanshu	Nominated	
25th Beijing College Student Film Festival	Best Screenplay	Sylvia Chang, You Xiaoying	Won	
23rd Huading Awards	Best Director	Sylvia Chang	Nominated	
23rd Huading Awards	Best Actress	Sylvia Chang	Nominated	
23rd Huading Awards	Best Supporting Actress	Lang Yueting	Nominated	
9th China Film Director's Guild Awards	Best Film	Love Equation	Nominated	
9th China Film Director's Guild Awards	Best Hong Kong/Taiwan Director	Sylvia Chang	Won	
9th China Film Director's Guild Awards	Best Actor	Tian Zhuangzhuang	Nominated	
9th China Film Director's Guild Awards	Best Actress	Sylvia Chang	Nominated	
9th China Film Director's Guild Awards	Best Screenwriter	Sylvia Chang, You Xiaoying	Won	
37th Hong Kong Film Awards	Best Film	Patricia Cheng	Nominated	
37th Hong Kong Film Awards	Best Director	Sylvia Chang	Nominated	
37th Hong Kong Film Awards	Best Screenplay	Sylvia Chang, You Xiaoying	Won	
37th Hong Kong Film Awards	Best Actor	Tian Zhuangzhuang	Nominated	
37th Hong Kong Film Awards	Best Actress	Sylvia Chang	Nominated	
37th Hong Kong Film Awards	Best Supporting Actress	Wu Yanshu	Nominated	
37th Hong Kong Film Awards	Best Cinematography	Mark Lee Ping-bing	Nominated	
37th Hong Kong Film Awards	Best Original Film Score	Kay Huang	Nominated	
37th Hong Kong Film Awards	Best Original Film Song	"Flowers in Blossom"; Composer: Kay Huang; Lyrics: Lam Kwun-fan; Performer: Sitar Tan	Nominated	
12th Asian Film Awards	Best Director	Sylvia Chang	Nominated	
12th Asian Film Awards	Best Actress	Sylvia Chang	Won	
12th Asian Film Awards	Best Supporting Actor	Tian Zhuangzhuang	Nominated	
12th Asian Film Awards	Best Supporting Actress	Wu Yanshu	Nominated	
12th Asian Film Awards	Best Screenplay	Sylvia Chang, You Xiaoying	Nominated	
54th Golden Horse Awards	Best Feature Film	Love Education	Nominated	
54th Golden Horse Awards	Best Director	Sylvia Chang	Nominated	
54th Golden Horse Awards	Best Leading Actor	Tian Zhuangzhuang	Nominated	
54th Golden Horse Awards	Best Leading Actress	Sylvia Chang	Nominated	
54th Golden Horse Awards	Best Supporting Actress	Wu Yanshu	Nominated	
54th Golden Horse Awards	Best Original Screenplay	Sylvia Chang and You Xiaoying	Nominated	
54th Golden Horse Awards	Best Original Film Song	"Flowers in Blossom"; Composer: Kay Huang; Lyrics: Lam Kwun-fan; Performer: Sitar Tan	Nominated	
54th Golden Horse Awards	Piaget Award	Love Education	Won	
