= Girls on Wire =

2025 Chinese drama film

- Theatrical release poster
- Traditional Chinese: 想飞的女孩
- Literal meaning: Girl who wants to fly
- Hanyu Pinyin: Xiǎng fēi de nǚhái
- Directed by: Vivian Qu
- Written by: Vivian Qu
- Produced by: Sean Chen; Hong Qin; Xu Jiahan
- Starring: Liu Haocun; Wen Qi; Zhang Youhao; Zhou You; Peng Jing
- Cinematography: Chaoyi Zhang
- Edited by: Hongyu Yang
- Music by: Wen Zi
- Production companies: L'Avvantura Films; JQ Spring Pictures
- Distributed by: Films Boutique
- Release dates: 17 February 2025 (Berlinale); 8 March 2025 (China)
- Running time: 115 minutes
- Country: China
- Language: Mandarin
- Box office: $2.1 million

Girls on Wire (Chinese: 想飞的女孩) is a 2025 Chinese drama film written and directed by Vivian Qu. It follows Tian Tian (Liu Haocun), a single mother who kills a drug dealer and is then pursued by those seeking vengeance.

The film had its world premiere at the main competition of the 75th Berlin International Film Festival on 17 February 2025, where it was nominated for the Golden Bear. It was theatrically released in China on 8 March.

== Synopsis ==
The film follows the journey of two estranged cousins over 20 years, exploring their evolution and redemption. After a desperate escape from a drug den, Tian Tian seeks refuge with her cousin Fang Di, whom she hasn't seen in five years. However, Fang Di, hardened by a life of struggles and broken dreams, is reluctant to reconcile. As danger looms with criminals closing in, their fates become inextricably linked once again.

== Cast ==
- Liu Haocun as Tian Tian
- Wen Qi as Fang Di
- Zhang Youhao as Ming
- Zhou You as Tian Tian's father
- Peng Jing as Fang Di's Mother

== Release ==
Girls on Wire had its world premiere on 17 February 2025, as part of the 75th Berlin International Film Festival, in Competition. The film will be screened in Cinephile Paradise at the 49th Hong Kong International Film Festival on 13 April 2025.

The film was released in China on 8 March 2025.

The film is selected at the 24th New York Asian Film Festival held from July 11 to July 25, 2025 for its North American Premiere. It will have its first screening on July 19 at the LOOK Cinemas W57. The film was also part of Horizons section of the 59th Karlovy Vary International Film Festival, where it was screened from 4 July to 9 July 2025.

On 28 October 2025, the film was showcased at the 38th Tokyo International Film Festival in 'World Focus' section. It will be presented in 'Cinema of the World - 2025' section of the 56th International Film Festival of India in November 2025.

Berlin-based Films Boutique acquired the sales rights of the film in January 2025.

== Accolades ==
Award	Date of ceremony	Category	Recipient	Result	Ref.
Berlin International Film Festival	23 February 2025	Golden Bear	Girls on Wire	Nominated	
