= Vivian Qu =

Chinese film director, screenwriter and producer

- Vivian Qu at the 54th Golden Horse Awards
- Born: Beijing, China
- Occupations: Film director; screenwriter; producer

Chinese name
- Chinese: 文晏
Transcriptions
Standard Mandarin
- Hanyu Pinyin: Wén Yàn

Vivian Qu (Chinese: 文晏; Wen Yan) is a Chinese film director, screenwriter and producer who directed the award-winning 2013 film Trap Street. She also produced Night Train, released in 2007, Knitting, in 2008 and Black Coal, Thin Ice in 2014, which won that year's Golden Bear Award at the Berlin International Film Festival.

In 2017, her second directing feature Angels Wear White was entered into the main competition section of the 74th Venice International Film Festival, and won the best film of Chinese films from first and second-time directors in the Pingyao International Film Festival. It later won her the Golden Horse Award for Best Director in Taiwan.

== Early life and education ==
Qu was born and brought up in Beijing, China. She used to study art design. She went to the United States in the 1990s and studied art history and fine arts in New York City. She says that the subject of cinema combined all her interests, in "writing, photography, music... together in one art form".

== Life and career ==
In 2003, Qu returned to Beijing, in order to become a film producer, and to pursue her interest in helping independent filmmakers. She says that she became aware that whilst filmmakers in China have good ideas and scripts, they lack the resources to produce or market their films for an international audience. In 2007, she began producing films in collaboration with Chinese film director Diao Yi'Nan, and first produced Night Train, the story of a young, widowed prison guard who takes a night train to a dating service, as she feels lonely and isolated. The film was screened at the Cannes Film Festival. The following year, she produced the film Knitting, a romantic drama told from a female perspective and based on the Chinese myth of the cowherd and the weaver girl, as told in the Qixi Festival. In 2013, she produced Longing for the Rain, the story of a woman living in a loveless marriage until a man appears in her dreams, and with whom she finds she cannot live without.

As Qu was working creatively with film directors in her role as film producer, she also decided to try to direct. Her debut feature as director, Trap Street, made in 2013, tells the story of a young digital map-maker who finds his computerised maps have been mysteriously altered after he becomes infatuated with a young woman working for China's intelligence service, in a street which does not officially exist. Qu says that the film reflects a changing reality in modern China, in which people have started to notice "little things that are happening", such as "the Internet and text messages being censored all the time", with social media services such as Facebook routinely inaccessible. She also says that people are detained by the authorities for apparently minor infractions, such as keying in particular words on search engines. However, she says that, despite such perceptions, for most of the younger generation in China, who did not live through such periods as the Cultural Revolution, "this is something completely new", and that they don't understand why it is happening. She says that, for her, "this [trend] is very disturbing... but we're not taking it seriously".

In 2017, Vivian Qu's second feature-length film Angels Wear White was shot in Hainan Island in China. The story happens in the Chinatown where a huge statue of ‘Forever Marilyn’ witnesses all the dark and suspicious activities going on in the Warmness Hotel. It focuses on two parallel storylines that tell the life and plight of two teenage girls, one as an “illegal” teenage worker without an ID at a hotel reception (Xiaomi or Mia), the other one as a schoolgirl that encountered sexual assault in that hotel (Wen). Mia witnesses the rape happening at the reception desk and there is this decision on whether to report the crime or not, while Wen has been through the aftermath of that crime from different perspectives that impacts her life. Qu tells the depressing incident in a critical tone and applies a soft compassion to the marginalized groups of women who have encountered sexual and physical abuse. As the film centres around these groups of women, Qu entitles the film to spread her voice for the objectifying women within the Chinese society.

While Qu dedicates to amplify facts of harm and suppression to the marginalized women on screen, Qu also pays close attention to female filmmakers’ position in the Chinese film industry. Along with the gender equity movements like Time's Up and #MeToo in the U.S., Qu expresses her concern that women are generally given less opportunity in the Chinese film industry. In Cannes in 2018, Qu states that women filmmakers are receiving less budgets for their proposals and are commonly thought to be only able to produce romantic genre. Such phenomenon substantially reduces female filmmakers’ opportunities and intensifies the gender inequality and sexism. Another issue mentions by Qu that exacerbates the situation in the Chinese film industry is that investors and the capital press filmmakers use young casts for the roles that are written for people much older. This aging process puts more stress on women producers and actresses.

Qu's directing style is largely influenced by French filmmaker Robert Bresson, and she uses a similar storytelling method to set the ending and the opening of the film in a way corresponding to each other. Her Angels Wear White won the best film of Chinese films from first and second-time directors in the Pingyao Awards and screened in Venice Film Festival in 2017. Qu also won the Best Director award at the Golden Horse Film Festival in Taiwan. After that, Qu decides to continue her life as a director instead of going back to being a producer. She also agrees on Ang Lee’s claim that exploring new technologies is an important orientation for the young generation directors.

== Filmography ==
=== As Scriptwriter ===
- 2004 Letter From an Unknown Woman
- 2013 Trap Street

=== As director ===
- 2013 Trap Street
- 2017 Angels Wear White
- 2025 Girls on Wire (想飞的女孩), Selected in competition of 75th Berlin International Film Festival and had its world premiere in February 2025.

=== As producer ===
- 2014 Black Coal, Thin Ice
- 2013 Chunmeng
- 2008 Knitting
- 2007 Night Train

== Awards and nominations ==
Year	Award	Category	Work	Result	Ref.
2013	32nd Vancouver International Film Festival	Dragons & Tigers Award	Trap Street	Runner-up	
2013	70th Venice International Film Festival	Critics' Week	Trap Street	Nominated	
2014	Independent Film Festival Boston	Grand Jury Prize	Trap Street	Won	
2017	74th Venice International Film Festival	Golden Lion	Angels Wear White	Nominated	
2017	61st BFI London Film Festival	Official Competition	Angels Wear White	Nominated	
2017	Pingyao International Film Festival	Fei Mu Award for Best Film	Angels Wear White	Won	
2017	54th Golden Horse Awards	Best Director	Angels Wear White	Won	
2017	54th Golden Horse Awards	Best Narrative Feature	Angels Wear White	Nominated	
2017	54th Antalya Golden Orange Film Festival	Golden Orange	Angels Wear White	Won	
2017	Festival des 3 Continents	Silver Montgolfiere	Angels Wear White	Won	
2018	12th Asian Film Awards	Best Film	Angels Wear White	Nominated	
2018	12th Asian Film Awards	Best New Director	Angels Wear White	Nominated	
2018	28th Tromsø International Film Festival	FIPRESCI Prize	Angels Wear White	Won	
2018	49th Nashville Film Festival	Best Screenplay	Angels Wear White	Won	
2018	20th RiverRun International Film Festival	Best Narrative Feature	Angels Wear White	Won	
2018	20th RiverRun International Film Festival	Peter Brunette Award for Best Director – Narrative Feature	Angels Wear White	Won	
2018	2nd Malaysia International Film Festival	Best Screenplay	Angels Wear White	Won	
2018	2nd Malaysia International Film Festival	Best Director	Angels Wear White	Won	
2018	9th China Film Director's Guild Awards	Director of the Year	Angels Wear White	Won	
2018	9th China Film Director's Guild Awards	Film of the Year	Angels Wear White	Nominated	
2018	9th China Film Director's Guild Awards	Screenplay of the Year	Angels Wear White	Nominated	
2018	25th Beijing College Student Film Festival	Grand Jury Prize	Angels Wear White	Won	
2019	38th Hong Kong Film Awards	Best Film from Mainland and Taiwan	Angels Wear White	Nominated	
2025	75th Berlin International Film Festival	Golden Bear	Girls on Wire	Nominated	
