= Trap Street (film) =

- Traditional Chinese: 水印街
- Simplified Chinese: 水印街
- Hanyu Pinyin: Shuiyin jie
- Directed by: Vivian Qu
- Written by: Vivian Qu
- Produced by: Sean Chen
- Starring: Lu Yulai; He Wenchao; Yong Hou; Zhao Xiaofei; Liu Tiejian; Li Xinghong
- Cinematography: Matthieu Laclau; Li Tian
- Edited by: Yang Hongyu
- Production companies: 22 Hours Films, Beijing
- Distributed by: ASC Distribution (France) – theatrical release
- Release date: September 1, 2013 (Venice)
- Running time: 93 minutes
- Country: China
- Language: Mandarin

Trap Street (Chinese: 水印街; pinyin: Shuiyin jie) is a 2013 Chinese film written and directed by debut Chinese film director Vivian Qu and starring Lu Yulai and He Wenchao. It premiered at the 2013 Venice International Film Festival, where it was nominated for the prestigious Luigi De Laurentiis Award. It subsequently won the Dragons and Tigers Award – Special Mention and second place in the Award itself at the Vancouver International Film Festival in the same year, and the Grand Jury Prize at the Boston Independent Film Festival in early 2014.

The film tells the story of a young digital map-making surveyor, working for a digital mapping company, who in his spare time helps install CCTV cameras. He becomes infatuated with a young woman who works at a mysterious building in a street he has recently mapped. After establishing what appears to be a growing friendship, he loses contact with her. Determined to find her by using his computing and electronic skills, he discovers that the street has mysteriously disappeared from the electronic record, and the CCTV images of it are not accessible.

== Plot ==
Trap Street tells the story of a young digital map-making surveyor, Li Qiuming, who works for a digital mapping company in a city in Southern China. During his spare time, he makes a little extra money by helping private clients to install CCTV cameras in places he has identified on his maps. One day, he finds an attractive young woman, and deciding to pluck up the courage to meet her, he tells her about his hobbies and the nature of his job. Her name is Guan Lifen. She seems to be uninterested in him, but he persists, and soon becomes infatuated with her. He offers her a lift home in his car, but after he has dropped her off, notices a small box with a memory stick inside it. He resolves to return it to her as soon as he can and arranges to meet her at a local cafe. However, Guan does not turn up, and a man arrives instead to collect the memory stick, asking Li for his home address so that he can thank him properly.

While looking for Guan, Li discovers her in an unlabelled street: it is called Forest Lane, and he sees Guan entering a mysterious building in it, known as Lab 23. He meets her and she now seems more interested in him. During a subsequent meeting, Li gives her the present of a satellite navigation device for her car, which impresses her, and they seem to become friends.

Losing contact with Guan, and unable to find her, Li decides to try tracking her down using the digital map he has created, and by accessing the video images off one of the CCTV cameras he has set up nearby. He is then shocked to discover that the street has disappeared from his map, and the video from the CCTV camera is unobtainable. On their next meeting, in a bar, some weeks later, Guan seems reluctant to talk to him, much as on their first meeting, and uninterested in the many efforts he has made to locate her. The mood darkens, and Li himself then disappears from the bar.

== Production ==
Trap Street was filmed in the city of Nanjing in central East-coast China, and marks the directorial debut of female Chinese film-maker Vivian Qu (文晏), a former film producer, who also wrote the screenplay. The film stars the Sichuan-born Chinese film scriptwriter and actor, Lu Yulai, and Chinese film director and actress, He Wenchao. The film has not yet been released in mainland China, as it must first be reviewed by China's State Administration of Press, Publication, Radio, Film and Television, the Chinese film industry's governing body. It has, however, been screened in Hong Kong (since 1997 a Special Autonomous Region of China), at the Hong Kong International Film Festival, and at many film festivals around the world.

The film takes its name from a trap street, a false street deliberately entered on a map by publishing houses in order to 'trap' anyone attempting to break copyright by selling copies of it while passing it off as their own work. The film's title inverts the meaning, becoming a real street which is deliberately obscured or removed from a map – and anyone who attempts to identify it by placing it on public record is then 'trapped'. GPS technology would supposedly uncover the existence of any such street, but the film's central message is that more powerful forces are able to shape both the technology and the public to "reflect the reality they wish to put across". The film was partly financed through a grant from the Swiss film fund Visions Sud Est.

== Cast ==
- Lu Yulai as Li Qiuming
- He Wenchao as Guan Lifen
- Yong Hou as Zhang Sheng
- Zhao Xiaofei as Qiuming's Father
- Liu Tiejian as Bo Xie
- Li Xinghong as Interrogator

== Reception ==
Trap Street enjoyed success at international film festivals across the world from an early stage. After receiving a nomination for the Luigi De Laurentiis Award at Venice on its world premiere on 1 September 2013, it went on to become an official selection of the 2013 Toronto International Film Festival on 6 September, where it was nominated for the Discovery Award.

At the Vancouver International Film Festival on 1 October, Trap Street won the Dragons and Tigers Award – Special Mention, as well as second place in the Dragons and Tigers Award. It was subsequently nominated for awards at many other festivals and won the Grand Jury Prize at the Boston Independent Film Festival on 24 April 2014. It is due for theatrical release across France, beginning on 18 June 2014.

=== Festival screenings, nominations and awards ===
- 2013 Venice International Film Festival, Italy
  - Luigi De Laurentiis Award (nomination)
  - 1 September 2013
- 2013 Toronto International Film Festival, Canada
  - Discovery Award (nomination)
  - 6 September 2013
- 2013 Vancouver International Film Festival, Canada
  - Dragon and Tigers Award – Special Mention
  - Dragon and Tigers Award – 2nd place
  - 1 October 2013
- 2Morrow Film Festival, Russia
  - 4 October 2013
- Warsaw International Film Festival, Poland
  - Grand Prize (nomination)
  - 11 October 2013
- BFI London Film Festival, United Kingdom
  - Sutherland Trophy (nomination)
  - 16 October 2013
- Stockholm International Film Festival, Sweden
  - 11 November 2013
- Tallinn Black Nights Festival, Estonia
  - Grand Prize (nomination)
  - 26 November 2013
- Kerala International Film Festival, India
  - 9 December 2013
- Rotterdam International Film Festival, the Netherlands
  - Lions Film Award (nomination)
  - 23 January 2014
- Portland International Film Festival, USA
  - 8 February 2014
- Jameson Dublin International Film Festival, Ireland
  - 21 February 2014
- Miami International Film Festival, USA
  - 10 March 2014
- Sofia International Film Festival, Bulgaria
  - Grand Prize (nomination)
  - 11 March 2014
- The Big Picture Film Festival, Australia
  - 21 March 2014
- Hong Kong International Film Festival, Hong Kong S.A.R., China
  - 26 March 2014
- Cleveland International Film Festival, USA
  - 27 March 2014
- New Directors/New Films Festival, USA
  - 28 March 2014
- National Museum of Singapore, Singapore
  - 5 April 2014
- Nashville Film Festival, USA
  - Best of Festival (nomination)
  - 19 April 2014
- Boston Independent Film Festival, USA
  - Grand Jury Prize
  - 24 April 2014
- MOOOV Filmfestival, Belgium
  - 26 April 2014
- San Francisco International Film Festival, USA
  - New Directors Prize (nomination)
  - 26 April 2014
- Kosmorama International Film Festival, Norway
  - 28 April 2014
- Theatrical distribution across France
  - 18 June 2014

== See also ==
- List of Chinese films of 2013
