= China Film Director's Guild Awards =

China Film Director's Guild Awards (Chinese: 中国导演协会年度表彰大会) are presented by China Film Director's Guild annually to honor excellence in cinema of China.

== Major award winners ==
Year	Best Film	Best Director	Best Actor	Best Actress	Best Screenwriter	Best Hong Kong / Taiwan Director	Best Young Director
2005; 1st	—N/a	Tian Zhuangzhuang for Delamu	Li Xuejian for South of the Clouds	Zhou Xun for Baober in Love	—N/a	—N/a	Lu Chuan for Kekexili: Mountain Patrol
2011; 2nd	Aftershock	Wang Xiaoshuai for Chongqing Blues	Wang Xueqi for Chongqing Blues	Xu Fan for Aftershock	Xue Xiaolu for Ocean Heaven	(Hong Kong) Dante Lam for The Stool Pigeon	Xu Jinglei for Go Lala Go!
2012; 3rd	Let the Bullets Fly	Jiang Wen for Let the Bullets Fly	Ge You for Let the Bullets Fly	Zhang Ziyi for Love for Life	Zhang Meng for The Piano in a Factory	(Hong Kong) Johnnie To for Life Without Principle	Du Jiayi for One Mile Above
2013; 4th	Back to 1942	Feng Xiaogang for Back to 1942	Huang Bo for Design of Death	Yan Bingyan for Feng Shui	Chen Kaige & Tang Danian for Caught in the Web	(Taiwan) Wei Te-sheng for Seediq Bale	Song Fang for Memories Look at Me
2014; 5th	—N/a	—N/a	Xu Zheng for No Man's Land	Tang Wei for Finding Mr. Right	Xue Xiaolu for Finding Mr. Right	(Hong Kong) Peter Chan for American Dreams in China	Li Ruijun for Fly with the Crane
2015; 6th	Black Coal, Thin Ice	Lou Ye for Blind Massage	Liao Fan for Black Coal, Thin Ice	Gong Li for Coming Home	Diao Yinan for Black Coal, Thin Ice	(Hong Kong) Ann Hui for The Golden Era	Lü Yang for Brotherhood of Blades
2016; 7th	Mr. Six	Guan Hu for Mr. Six	Feng Xiaogang for Mr. Six	Bai Baihe for Go Away Mr. Tumor	Ah Cheng for The Assassin	(Taiwan) Hou Hsiao-hsien for The Assassin	Gan Bi for Kaili Blues
2017; 8th	I Am Not Madame Bovary	Cheng Er for The Wasted Times	Zhang Yi for Cock and Bull	Fan Bingbing for I Am Not Madame Bovary	Liu Zhenyun for I Am Not Madame Bovary	(Hong Kong) Derek Tsang for Soul Mate	Zhang Dalei for The Summer Is Gone
2018; 9th	Youth	Vivian Qu for Angels Wear White	Tu Men for Old Beast	Zhou Dongyu for This Is Not What I Expected	Sylvia Chang & You Xiaoying for Love Education	(Taiwan) Sylvia Chang for Love Education	Zhou Ziyang for Old Beast
2019; 10th	Dying to Survive	Jia Zhangke for Ash Is Purest White	Eric Wang for Dying to Survive	Ma Yili for Lost, Found	Song Tairu, Zhaxi Dawa for Ala Changso	(Hong Kong) Felix Chong for Project Gutenberg	Wen Muye for Dying to Survive
2020; 11th。	The Wandering Earth	Wang Xiaoshuai for So Long, My Son	Wang Jingchun for So Long, My Son	Zhou Dongyu for Better Days	Diao Yinan for The Wild Goose Lake	(Hong Kong) Derek Tsang for Better Days	Huo Meng for Crossing The Border-ZhaoGuan
2021; 12th	The Eight Hundred	Pema Tseden for Balloon	Jinpa for Balloon	Gong Li for Leap	Zhang Ji for Leap	(Hong Kong) Peter Chan for Leap	Gu Xiaogang for Dwelling in the Fuchun Mountains
2022; 13th	Hi, Mom	Lu Yang for A Writer's Odyssey	Chen Jianbin for The Eleventh Chapter	Zhou Xun for The Eleventh Chapter	Shao Yihui for Myth of Love	(Taiwan) Leste Chen for Upcoming Summer	Shao Yihui for Myth of Love
2023; 14th	Home Coming	—N/a	Zhu Yilong for Lighting Up the Stars	Wu Yanshu & Xi Meijuan for Song of Spring	Liu Bing & Geng Jun for Manchurian Tiger	(Hong Kong) Tsui Hark for The Battle at Lake Changjin II	Li Gen for Before Next Spring
2024; 15th	Creation of the Gods I: Kingdom of Storms	Cao Baoping for Across the Furious Sea	Yang Haoyu for Journey to the West	Zhou Xun for Across the Furious Sea	Hongni Xiaohuolu for Chang'an	(Hong Kong) Philip Yung for Where the Wind Blows	Kong Dashan for Journey to the West
2025; 16th	The Sinking of the Lisbon Maru	Guan Hu for Black Dog	Jackson Yee for Big World	Song Jia for Her Story; Yong Mei for Like a Rolling Stone	Shao Yihui for Her Story	(Hong Kong) Soi Cheang for Twilight of the Warriors: Walled In	Gao Peng for A Long Shot
2026; 17th	Ne Zha 2	Cai Shangjun for The Sun Rises on Us All	Tony Leung Ka-fai for The Shadow's Edge	Xin Zhilei for The Sun Rises on Us All	Yu Shui & Liu Jia for Nobody	(Taiwan) Shu Qi for Girl	Shen Ao for Dead to Rights

== Other awards ==
=== Box Office Director of the Year ===
Year	Winner	Film
2005; 1st	Zhang Yimou	House of Flying Daggers

=== Lifetime Achievement award ===
Year	Winner
2005; 1st	Wu Tianming
2011; 2nd	Xie Tieli
2012; 3rd	Wu Yigong

=== Special Jury award ===
Year	Winner	Work
2013; 4th	Xu Zheng	
2014; 5th	Cui Jian	
2015; 6th	Dearest	
2016; 7th	Zhang Yang	Paths of the Soul
2017; 8th	Wang Xuebo	Knife in the Clear Water
2017; 8th	Wang Yichun	What's In The Darkness
2018; 9th	Zheng Dasheng	Bangzi Melody
2019; 10th		Have a Nice Day
2020; 11th		Ne Zha; My People, My Country
2021; 12th	—N/a	—N/a
2022; 13th		I Am What I Am
2023; 14th		Yanagawa; Moon Man
2024; 15th		One and Four
2025; 16th	Pema Tseden (Director)	Snow Leopard
2025; 16th	Li Meng & Zhang Yimou (Screenwriter)	Article 20
2026; 17th	Da Peng	The Lychee Road

=== Special Contribution award ===
Year	Winner
2013; 4th	Xie Fei

=== Outstanding Contribution for Director ===
Year	Winner
2014; 5th	Teng Wenji
2015; 6th	Zheng Dongtian
2016; 7th	Huang Shuqin
2017; 8th	Yan Jizhou
2018; 9th	Han Sanping
2019; 10th	Huang Jianxin
2020; 11th	Li Shaohong
2021/2022/2023/2024; 12th/13th/14th/15th	Zhang Yimou
2025; 16th	Tian Zhuangzhuang
2026; 17th	Chen Kaige

=== Outstanding Directorial Debut ===
Year	Winner
2015; 6th	The Coffin in the Mountain
