= This Is Not What I Expected =

2017 Chinese-Hong Kong film by Peter Chan

- Theatrical release poster
- Directed by: Derek Hui
- Screenplay by: Li Yuan; Xu Yi-meng
- Based on: Finally I Get You by Lan Bai Se
- Produced by: Peter Chan; Jojo Hui
- Starring: Takeshi Kaneshiro; Zhou Dongyu
- Cinematography: Fisher Yu; Zhao Xiaoshi
- Edited by: Derek Hui; Zhou Xiaolin; Tan Xiang-Yuan
- Music by: Chan Kwong-wing; Patrick Lui; Clement Fung
- Production companies: Alibaba Pictures; We Pictures
- Distributed by: Alibaba Pictures
- Release date: 27 April 2017
- Running time: 106 minutes
- Countries: China; Hong Kong
- Language: Mandarin
- Budget: US$18 million
- Box office: US$30 million

This Is Not What I Expected (Chinese: 喜欢你) is a 2017 romantic comedy film directed by Derek Hui and produced by Peter Chan, starring Takeshi Kaneshiro and Zhou Dongyu. It is adapted from the novel Finally I Get You written by Lan Bai Se. The film was released on 27 April 2017.

== Plot ==
26-year-old Gu Sheng Nan (Zhou Dongyu) is a chef at a hotel. One day, Lu Jin (Takeshi Kaneshiro) leaves a business meeting and discovers Gu Sheng Nan vandalising his car, mistaking it for a different car. Lu Jin leaves to a hotel where he has his next buyout plan. It turns out that Gu Sheng Nan happens to also be working there as a chef. As a way of persuading Lu Jin to buy the hotel, the manager has each of the chefs cook him a dish. He is dissatisfied with all of the dishes, but the manager tells him to try one more. The manager pleads with Gu Sheng Nan to make a special dish for Lu Jin. Lu Jin is given the dish and reacts very positive to it. He decides to keep the hotel going just to continue, but only if the chef continues to cook for him.

The following night Lu Jin sees Gu Sheng Nan on the roof drunk. She falls into his balcony and he confronts her as to why she is there, not knowing that she is the chef who cooked for him. The weeks go by and he finds himself running into Gu Sheng Nan on multiple occasions, thinking that she has a personal vendetta against him. Lu Jin eventually comes to the conclusion that Gu Sheng Nan is the secret chef who has been cooking for him.

While Gu Sheng Nan takes time off from work, Lu Jin is able to find out where she lives and comes there asking her to cook for him. He eventually falls asleep on Gu Sheng's couch after eating dinner. Lu Jin makes this part of his new schedule and comes to Gu Sheng Nan's apartment every day to eat and sleep on her couch. One day the two eat puffer fish, but because it was bad, given to her by 'a rich friend, a fellow businessman bought it,' she says (unbeknownst to Lu Jin it was his associate who has a reason for keeping his boss happy with good food) and they both start to hallucinate and get high off the toxins. They spend the night roaming around the city hallucinating, but when they get on the bus the toxins worn off in Lu Jin, but Gu Sheng Nan is still hallucinating. He brings her home and the following day he does not show up in the hotel room where he was staying.

Gu Sheng Nan goes to his house and discovers that he has his own personal chef, who is also a woman. Lu Jing tells Gu Sheng Nan that he stayed at the hotel and ate her cooking because his own personal chef was on leave. Gu Sheng Nan angrily leaves. The following day Lu Jing is told by his company that the hotel is not up to standards and it will be turned into a different business. All of the workers are fired, and Gu Sheng Nan confronts Lu Jing, which Lu Jing says that the hotel is not up to standards and he has no choice but to fire everyone. He tells Gu Sheng Nan that he has no choice but to do it, and that to succeed in life, he had to fire a worker who worked 20 years for a company when he was only 19 years old.

Lu Jing leaves for his London office, and while there he asks his personal chef to sit down and eat dinner with him. She tells him that she can't because she has always made enough for just one person. That following night she writes him a text telling him that she can no longer be his chef because she knows that he is interested in more than just good food, he wants a person there to be with him. Lu Jing travels back to Shanghai and is able to locate Gu Sheng Nan through a previous alarm system he had in order to avoid her and have her avoid him. She flees but he finally hunts her down and tells her he has no place for her, as in another job, but that there's a place by his side. Eventually they both go up to a balcony and watch the sunset together. During the credits they're still watching and get hungry but he says he'll cook for her. Later still they're in the dark watching the night and Lu Jin suggests that they watch the sunrise.

== Cast ==
- Takeshi Kaneshiro as Lu Jin
- Zhou Dongyu as Gu Shengnan
- Sun Yizhou as Xiao Meng
- Ming Xi as Xu Zhaodi
- Tony Yang as Cheng Ziqian
- Lin Chi-ling as Lu Jin's personal chef
- Chang Kuo-chu as Lu Jin's father
- Zhao Yingjun as Policeman
- Gao Xiaosong as himself

== Reception ==
The film grossed a total of CN¥209.9 million in China.

=== Critical reception ===
On the review aggregator website Rotten Tomatoes, 78% of 9 critics' reviews are positive.

== Awards and nominations ==
Awards	Category	Nominee	Results	Ref.
2nd Golden Screen Awards	Best Co-Production Film	This Is Not What I Expected	Won	
2nd Golden Screen Awards	Best Actor	Takeshi Kaneshiro	Won	
14th Guangzhou Student Film Festival	Most Popular Actress	Zhou Dongyu	Won	
12th Asian Film Awards	Best Actress	Zhou Dongyu	Nominated	
12th Asian Film Awards	Best New Director	Derek Hui	Nominated	
12th Asian Film Awards	Best Production Design	Ben Luk	Nominated	
9th China Film Director's Guild Awards	Best Film	This Is Not What I Expected	Nominated	
9th China Film Director's Guild Awards	Best Actress	Zhou Dongyu	Won	
9th China Film Director's Guild Awards	Best Screenwriter	Xu Yimeng, Li Yuan	Nominated	
37th Hong Kong Film Awards	Best New Director	Derek Hui	Nominated	
37th Hong Kong Film Awards	Best Original Film Song	"When I Love You"	Nominated	
37th Hong Kong Film Awards	Best Costume Make Up Design	Dora Ng	Nominated	
