= Pingyao International Film Festival =

Film festival in China

- Location: Pingyao, Shanxi, China
- Founded: 16 March 2017
- Founded by: Jia Zhangke
- Awards: Roberto Rossellini Award, Fei Mu Award
- Artistic director: Lin Xudong
- Festival date: Opening: 24 September 2026; Closing: 30 September 2026
- Language: International
- Website: www.pyiffestival.com

Current: 9th
- 10th 8th

The Pingyao International Film Festival (PYIFF), officially as "Pingyao Crouching Tiger, Hidden Dragon International Film Festival", is a film festival held in Pingyao, Shanxi, China. It was launched in October 2017 by Jia Zhangke, a Chinese film director, screenwriter and leading figure of the "Sixth Generation" movement of Chinese cinema and prestigious festival director Marco Müller. The festival's goal is to bring attention to works done by young, lesser known directors in the Chinese film industry, as well as to encourage communication and cooperation between Chinese and international filmmakers, mainly showing films from Asia, Eastern Europe, Latin America, and Africa.

== History ==
Zhangke first announced the creation of the Pingyao International Film Festival (PYIFF) in 2017 during a press conference for the China Film Directors Center in Beijing, where this festival is commercially operated and government-guided. Marco Müller, PYIFF's artistic director, who has also served as former chief adviser and selector at the Beijing International Film Festival and former director of the Venice, Rome and Locarno film festivals, confirmed that the festival's name was permitted by Ang Lee, director of the 2000 film Crouching Tiger, Hidden Dragon. In a subsequent interview, Müller stated that in 2015 he and Jia Zhangke collaborated their resources for the purposes of creating a film festival in China, which was finalized after Müller visited the ancient city of Pingyao in 2016.

== PYIFF 2017 ==
The 1st Pingyao International Film Festival took place in the Pingyao Festival Palace between 28 October and 4 November 2017. John Woo was among the guests during the opening ceremony and received the Honorary Award for Significant Contribution to Culture Exchange Between the East and West. The opening film of the festival was Youth!

=== Awards ===
- Roberto Rossellini Awards
  - Best Film: Suleiman Mountain (director Elizaveta Stishova, Russia/Kyrgyzstan/Poland, 2017)
  - Best Director: Chloé Zhao (The Rider, USA, 2017)

Jury:
Vishal Bhardwaj (India – film director, script writer, composer and producer)
Liu Zhenyun (China – writer and scriptwriter)
Kaori Momoi (Japan – actress and director)
Renzo Rossellini (Italy – producer and president of the Roberto Rossellini Foundation)
Aleksey German JR. (Russia – director and writer)
Arnaud Desplechin (France – director and cinematographer)
Xie Fei (China – director and professor)

- Fei Mu Awards (Selected from the Chinese-language films)
  - Best Film: Angels Wear White (director Vivian Qu, China, 2017)
  - Best Director: Liu Jian (on Have a Nice Day, China, 2017)

Jury:
Anurag Kashyap (India, director, producer, writer, Actor)
Song Fang (China, director, Writer)
Ivy Ho (Hong Kong, Producer)
Shozo Ichiyama (Japan, Producer)
Lin Xudong (China, Painter, Editor and Film Critic)
Jean-Michel Frodon (France, journalist, Film Critic and Writer)
Wong Ain-Ling (Hong Kong, Film Critic, Researcher and Writer)

- Work in Progress Lab-Wings Project Award
  - The Pig Butcher (2016, director Wang Yitong)

== PYIFF 2018 ==
The 2nd Pingyao International Film Festival was held from 11 to 20 October 2018. The ten-day event screened fifty-five films from twenty-five countries and regions in ten sections such as:

1) Crouching Tigers (directorial debuts or second features worldwide),

2) Hidden Dragons (exceptional genre films worldwide)

3) Gala

4) Best of Fest

5) Special presentation

6) New Generation China (latest work from young Chinese directors) sections.

Films that were screened in the 2nd Pingyao International Film Festival include:

Crouching Tigers | debut or second feature film by new directors

- Dear Son by Mohamed Ben Attia (Tunisia / 2nd film / Asian Premiere)
- The Load by Ognjen Glavonić (Serbia / 1st film / Asian Premiere)
- Empire Hotel by Ivo Ferreira (Portugal / 2nd film / World Premiere)
- Soni by Ivan Ayr (India /1st film / Asian Premiere)
- Meteors by Romain Laguna (France / 1st film / Asian Premiere)
- The Man Who Surprised Everyone by Natasha Merkulova & Aleksey Chupov (Russia / 2nd film / China Premiere)
- A Land Imagined by Yeo Siuw Hua (Singapore / 2nd film / Asian Premiere)
- The Crossing by Bai Xue (China / 1st film / Asian Premiere)

Hidden Dragons | imaginative and original genre film from around the world

- Los silencios (The Silences) by Beatriz Seigner (Brazil / Asian Premiere)
- En liberté (The Trouble with You) by Pierre Salvadori (France / China Premiere)
- Vulkan (Volcano) by Roman Bondarchuk (Ukraine / Asian Premiere)
- Kraben rahu (Manta Ray) by Phuttiphong Aroonpheng (Thailand / China Premiere)
- Cities of Last Things by Ho Wi-ding (Taiwan / China Premiere)
- When Love Blossoms by Ye Jiangtian (China / World Premiere)

Gala | new films by major directors

- Vada Chennai (North Chennai) by Vetri Maraan (India / World Premiere)
- Wildlife by Paul Dano (United States / Asian Premiere)
- Un peuple et son roi (One Nation, One King) by Pierre Schoeller (France / China Premiere)
- The Pluto Moment by Zhang Ming (China / China Premiere)
- Red Flowers and Green Leaves by Liu Miaomiao, Hu Weijie (China / World Premiere)
- Baby by Liu Jie (China / Asian Premiere)

Best of Fest

- Girl by Lukas Dhont (Belgium / China Premiere)
- Tarde para morir joven (Too Late to Die Young) by Dominga Sotomayor (Chile / Asian Premiere)
- Lazzaro felice (Happy as Lazzaro) by Alice Rohrwacher (Italy / China Premiere)
- Ayka by Sergey Dvortsvoy (Russia / Final version | World Premiere)
- Gangbyun hotel (Hotel by the River) by Hong Sang Soo (South Korea / Asian Premiere)

Special Presentations | special screenings, masterclass

- Half The Sky by Daniela Thomas, Elizaveta Stishova, Ashwiny Iyer Tiwari, Liu Yulin, Sara Blecher (China / International Premiere / Opening film)
- The Wind Guardians by Liu Kuo (China / Festival Mentor's Choice)
- Lust Stories by Anurag Kashyap, Zoya Akhtar, Dibakar Banerjee and Karan Johar (India / Netflix India / New Media)
- Throw Down by Johnnie To (Restored / Hong Kong / China Premiere / EAST-WEST Contribution)
- Beoning (Burning) by Lee Chang-dong + Masterclass
- Ang Panahon ng Halimaw (Season of the Devil) by Lav Diaz (Philippines) + Masterclass

New Generation China | selection of the most original new Chinese language films

- Don't Walk Away by Li Jiaxi (World Premiere)
- Three Adventures of Brooke by Zhu Yuanqing (Asian Premiere)
- Lush Reeds by Yang Yishu (Asian Premiere)
- Life of Zhang Chu by Lu Yulai (World Premiere)
- Crossing The Boarder by Huo Meng (World Premiere)
- Dead Pigs by Cathy Yan (China Premiere)
- My Dear Friend by Yang Pingdao (China Premiere)

== PYIFF 2019 ==
The 3rd Pingyao International Film Festival was held on 10-19 October 2019. The festival kicked off with a gala screening of Han Yan's Old Neighborhood and was closed with the world premiere of Hong Kong director Jacob Cheung’s The Opera House.

== PYIFF 2020 ==
The 4th Pingyao International Film Festival was held on 10-19 October 2019 as a physical event without international guests due to COVID-19. The opening film and Special Presentation of the festival are both world premieres of Chinese productions – Sun Hong's This Is Life will open the festival, while Zhang Yang's So Far So Close will screen as the Special Presentation title on the night of the awards ceremony.

Crouching Tigers | international directorial debuts or second features

- Asia (Israel) – Dir: Ruthy Pribar (Asian Premiere)
- The Whale Boy (Russia, Poland, Belgium) – Dir: Philipp Yuryev (Asian Premiere)
- Residue (US) – Dir: Merawi Gerim (Asian Premiere)
- The Stonebreaker (Italy, France, Belgium) – Dirs: Gianluca De Serio, Massimiliano De Serio (Asian Premiere)
- Memory House (Brazil, France) – Dir: João Paulo Miranda Maria (Asian Premiere)
- The Book Of Vision (Italy, UK, Belgium) – Dir: Carlo S. Hintermann (Asian Premiere)
- Milestone (India) – Dir: Ivan Ayr (Asian Premiere)
- Oasis (Serbia, Slovenia, Netherlands, France, Bosnia & Herzegovina) – Dir: Ivan Ikic (Asian Premiere)
- Preparations to Be Together for an Unknown Period of Time (Hungary) – Dir: Lili Horvat (Asian Premiere)
- Yalda, A Night For Forgiveness (France, Germany, Switzerland, Luxembourg, Lebanon, Iran) – Dir: Massoud Bakhshi (China Premiere)
- A Balance (Japan) – Dir: Yujiro Harumoto (World Premiere)
- Atomic Summer (France) – Dir: Gaël Lépingle (World Premiere)

Hidden Dragons | Chinese-language films by first and second-time feature directors

- The Best Is Yet To Come (China) – Dir: WANG Jing (Asian Premiere)
- Summer Blur (China) – Dir: HAN Shuai (World Premiere)
- Cafe By the Highway (China) – Dir: SHI Xiaofan (World Premiere)
- Stars Await Us (China) – Dir: ZHANG Dalei (World Premiere)
- A Yang Pingdao Film (China) – Dir: YANG Pingdao (World Premiere)
- Mama (China, France) – Dir: LI Dongmei (Asian Premiere)
- The Calming (China) – Dir: SONG Fang (Asian Premiere)
- A Song For You (China) – Dir: Dukar Tserang (World Premiere)
- Where Is My Flight Home (China) – Dir: WANG Lei (World Premiere)
- An Insignificant Affair (China) – Dir: NING Yuanyuan (Asian Premiere)
- Happiness Of Iberia (China) – Dir: CHE Yu-shi (World Premiere)
- Striding Into The Wind (China) – Dir: Wei Shujun (World Premiere)

== PYIFF 2021 ==
The 5th Pingyao International Film Festival was held on 12-10 October 2021.

Crouching Tigers | first second and third films from around the world

- Amparo, directed by Simón Mesa Soto (Colombia, Sweden, Qatar)
- As Far As I Can Walk, directed by Strahinja Banovic (Serbia, Luxembourg, France, Bulgaria, Lithuania)
- Feathers, directed by Omar El Zohairy (France, Egypt, The Netherlands, Greece)
- Mama, I’m Home (Mama, Ya Doma) directed by Vladimir Bitokov (Russia)
- Pedro directed by Natesh Hegde (India)
- Playground (Un Monde) directed by Laura Wandel (Belgium)
- Prayers for the Stolen (Noche de Fuego) directed by Tatiana Huezo (Mexico, Germany, Brazil, Qatar)
- Rehana (Rehana Maryam Noor) directed by Abdullah Mohammad Saad (Bangladesh, Singapore, Qatar)
- The Tale of King Crab (Re Granchio) directed by Alessio Rigo de Righi & Matteo Zoppis (Italy, Argentina, France)
- What Do We See When We Look at the Sky? (Ras vkhedavt, rodesac cas vukurebt) directed by Alexandre Koberidze (Germany, Georgia)
- Whether the Weather Is Fine (Kun Maupay Man It Panahon) directed by Carlo Francisco Manatad (Philippines, France, Singapore, Indonesia, Germany, Qatar)
- White Building (Bodeng Sar) directed by Kavich Neang (Cambodia, France)

Hidden Dragons | Chinese-language films by first-, second- or third-time directors

- Streetwise (Gaey Wa’r) by Na Jiazuo (Debuted in Cannes)
- Minibus Driver by Dong Chunze (World Premiere)
- Karma by Zheng Peike (World Premiere)
- Venus by Water by Wang Lin
- Lost in Summer by Sun Liang
- The Last Post by Tu Men(World Premiere)
- Grateful to Have You by Jia Su
- Summer Sonatina by Yan Hai(World Premiere)
- Ripples of Life by Wei Shujun (Cannes film)
- Journey to the West by Kong Dashan (World Premiere)

== PYIFF 2022 ==
The 6th Pingyao International Film Festival was held on 14-19 January 2023.

Crouching Tigers | first second and third films from around the world

- Next Sohee, by Jung Ju-ri, (South Korea)
- Under the Fig Trees, by Erige Sehiri, (Tunisia, France, Switzerland, Qatar)

== PYIFF 2024 ==
The 8th Pingyao International Film Festival was held from 21-30 September 2024.

Winners

- Crouching Tiger Hidden Dragon East-West Award:
  - Chen Kaige
  - Walter Salles
- Roberto Rossellini Awards:
  - Best Film: The Sparrow in the Chimney, by Ramon Zurcher, Switzerland
  - Best Director: Boris Lojkine for Souleymane's Story, France

== PYIFF 2025 ==
The 9th Pingyao International Film Festival was held from 21 to 30 September 2025.

Winners

- Crouching Tiger Hidden Dragon East-West Award
  - Feng Xiaogang
  - Teruyo Nogami
- International Contribution to Chinese Cinema Award
  - Kim Dong-ho
- Fei Mu Awards [Hidden Dragons section]
  - Best Film: Deep Quiet Room, dir. Shen Ko-shang
  - Best Director: Zhang Zhongchen, Nighttime Sounds
  - Best Actress: Ranice Tay, Amoeba, dir. Tan Siyou
  - Best Actor: Joseph Chang, Deep Quiet Room, dir. Shen Ko-shang
  - Jury Award: The Toddling Youths (documentary), dir. Qi Yanyan
  - Best Short Film: After the Cat, dir. Chu Hoi Ying
- Roberto Rossellini Awards [Crouching Tigers section]
  - Best Film: The President's Cake, dir. Hasan Hadi
  - Best Director: Akinola Davies Jr., My Father's Shadow
  - Jury Award: The World of Love, dir. Yoon Ga-eun
- Youth Jury Award
  - Amoeba, dir. Tan Siyou
- Tong Ye Award
  - Daughters, dir. Miao Zhuangzhuang
- Netpac Award – Best First Film
  - Daughters, dir. Miao Zhuangzhuang
- Cinephilia Critics' Award
  - Amoeba, dir. Tan Siyou
- Pingyao Corner
  - Best Student Short Film: Quick Pause, Quick Breath, dir. Li Longjianhui (Central Academy of Drama)
  - Best Student Short Film – Special Mention:
    - I Wanna Fly, dir. Liu Canwen (Shanghai Vancouver Film School)
    - Downstream, dir. Song Yibo (Beijing Film Academy)
- Chinese Filmmaker of the Year
  - Huo Meng, Bi Gan, Cai Shangjun

== PYIFF 2026 ==
The 10th Pingyao International Film Festival will be held from 24 to 30 September 2026.

Opening film: Spring in a Small Town, by Fei Mu (4K restoration, 1948)
Closing film: Good Trip, by Norris Wong, Hoi Wong (2026)

Winners

=== Fei Mu Awards – Hidden Dragons ===
- Best Film: Final Payment, Niu Niu
- Unitree Best Director: Xu Zao, Light Pillar
- Best Actress: Sun Yi, A Joke, Wang Xiaozhen
- Best Actor: Niu Jianrong, Final Payment, Niu Niu
- Jury Award: Zoom In, Zoom Out, Dong Jie
- Special Mention: Suzhou Quartet, Cai Chengjie
