= Wei Shujun =

Chinese filmmaker

- 魏书钧
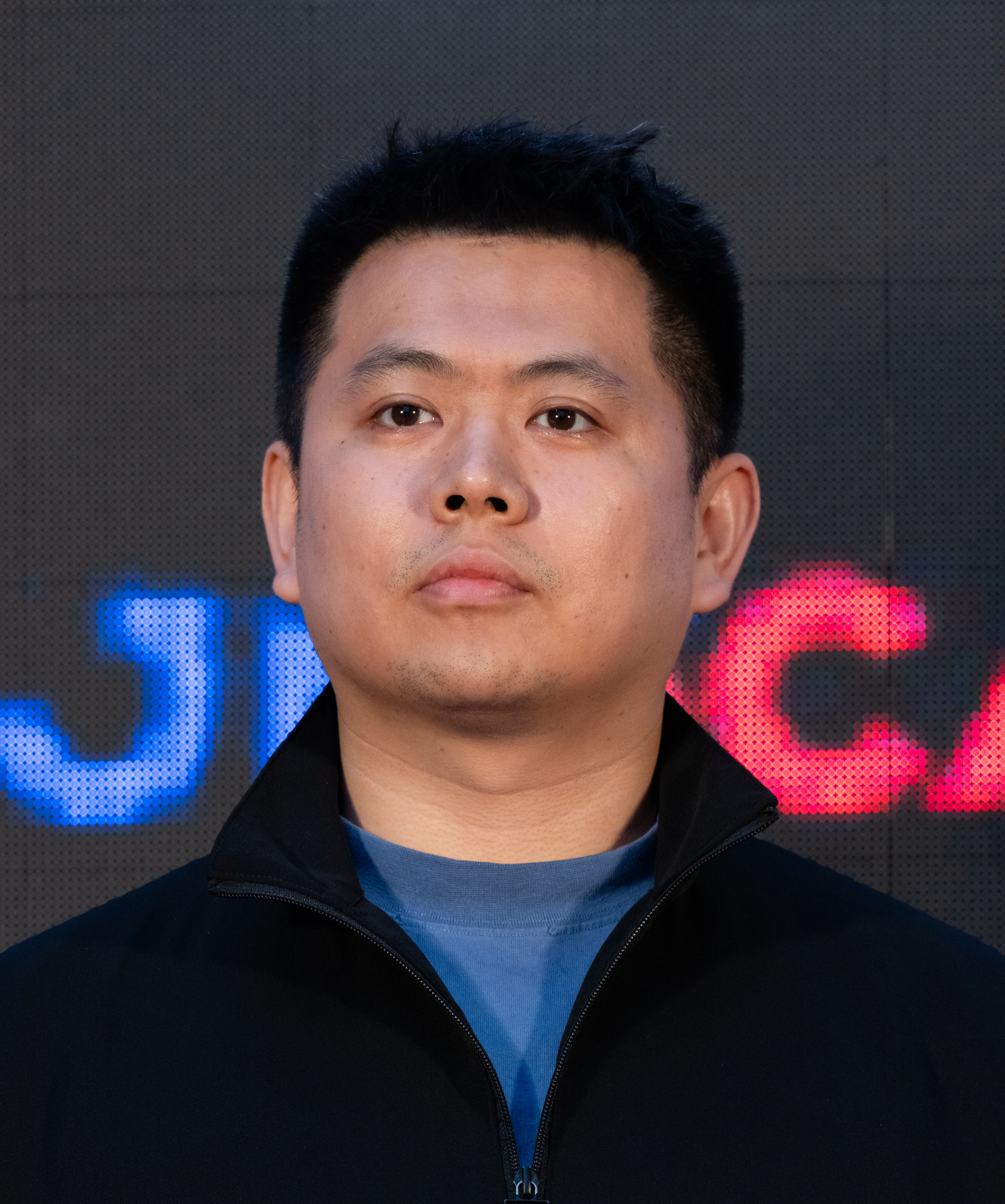
- Wei in 2024
- Born: Beijing, China
- Education: Communication University of China
- Occupations: Film director; screenwriter
- Years active: 2016–present

Wei Shujun (Chinese: 魏书钧; pinyin: Wèi Shūjūn) is a Chinese film director, screenwriter and actor based in Beijing. He is best known for his feature films Only the River Flows (2023) and Striding Into the Wind (2020). His short film On the Border (2018) won the Mention Spéciale at the 2018 Cannes Film Festival. Other films by him include Ripples of Life (2021), Mostly Sunny (2024), I Dreamed a Dream (2025) and the upcoming Mr. Crane Is Back!.

== Early life and education ==
Wei started his career in film at the age of fourteen as a child actor. Wei is a fan of hip-hop and considered a career as a professional musician when he was in his twenties. Wei went on to study sound recording at the Communication University of China. At university, he watched a lot of movies and became increasingly interested in making films.

== Career ==
Wei directed his first film Duck Neck (浮世千) in 2016. Two years later, Wei followed it up with a short film, 2018's On the Border (延边少年), which was awarded the Special Mention at the 2018 Cannes Film Festival. Wei's debut feature film Striding Into the Wind was released in 2020 and set to premiere at the 73rd Cannes Film Festival, which was later canceled. It was eventually screened at the BFI London Film Festival in October 2020. The plot follows two skeptical sound recording students on a roadtrip to Inner Mongolia, where they intend to film a movie. In a 2022 interview, Wei revealed that the main characters were largely based on his own experience at film school that he and co-writer Gao Linyang went to together.

The following year, Wei's sophomore feature film Ripples of Life (永安镇故事集) was screened at the 2021 Directors' Fortnight. The movie captures the process of filmmaking in the Chinese indie industry, following different members of a film crew preparing for production. The movie is split into three "novels", each taking on a different set of perspectives. The movie's screenwriter, Kang Chunlei, said of the theme of the movie, "We hope to explore the stagnation of life and its impact on each individual". Kang and producer Huang Xuefeng played the part of the screenwriter and producer respectively.

Wei's film Only the River Flows was released in 2023 and was a box office hit in China. An adaptation of Yu Hua's barely known 1987 novella Mistakes By The River (河边的错误), it marked the second collaboration with Kang as co-screenwriter. The story follows Detective Ma Zhe (Zhu Yilong) investigating a series of murders in a fictional riverside town in mid-1990s China. Only the River Flows is Wei's first feature film not to center on young filmmakers, but instead draws parallels between the professions of filmmaking and law enforcement. Only the River Flows screened as part of the Un Certain Regard competition at the 2023 Cannes Film Festival, making it the third film by Wei to be picked up by the festival.

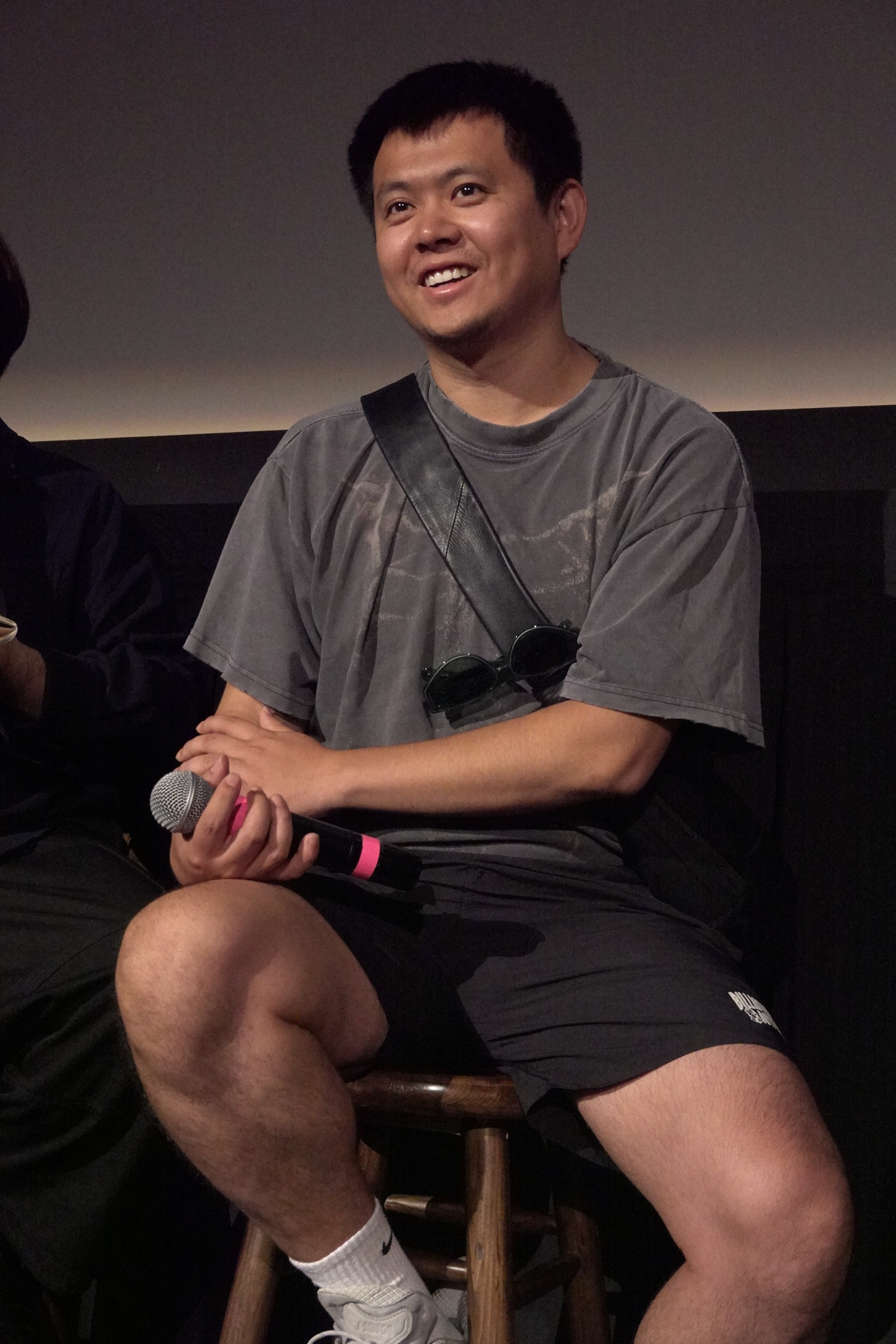
Wei speaking at Metrograph in 2024

2024 saw the release of Mostly Sunny (阳光俱乐部), a family drama starring Huang Xiaoming and Zu Feng as brothers dealing in radically different ways with their mother's cancer diagnosis. Written and directed by Wei, the film additionally features fellow film director Jia Zhangke in a supporting role. After Wei's arthouse success, he has commented on the more commercial context that Mostly Sunny was produced under, further saying "I have a responsibility for the money and to the industry. Arthouse films in China usually don't do well financially. So if you fail, it's even more difficult to find money for your next film." The movie was co-written by former collaborator Yixiang Zhai and shot by Chengma. The following year, Wei's docu-fiction film I Dreamed a Dream premiered at the International Film Festival Rotterdam. The film follows a group of young men with ambitions to become famous rappers as they take part in a mysterious film shoot led by an absent genius director. The film marks yet another collaboration with cinematographer Chengma Zhiyuan.

Wei's upcoming film, Mr. Crane Is Back! (白鹤亮翅), has been in production since at least 2022. In a 2024 interview, Wei announced work on an upcoming 12-episode TV series executive produced by Diao Yinan.

== Themes and influences ==
Wei's films have often meditated on the process of filmmaking and the realities of the domestic industry. Another theme that Wei examines in his work is empirical rationality. Mostly Sunny and Only the River Flows both feature main characters that struggle against the limits of a rational worldview under extreme circumstances.

== Critical reception ==
A "rave review" of Only the River Flows written by Jessica Kiang from Variety especially highlighted the film's cinematography and complimented the deliberately confusing nature of the movie, in addition to its "pitch-black" sense of humour. Ding Rui, writing for Sixth Tone, went further to connect the open-endedness of the narrative to its domestic box office success, writing, "Only the River Flows encourages audiences to draw their own conclusions, helping fuel widespread debates on social media" and called the movie a "psychological experiment". In an interview with French film website Cinematraque, Wei was compared to other young Chinese film directors such as Gu Xiaogang and Bi Gan. When asked about that connection, he said that he hopes their generation can leave a mark on cinema.

== Filmography ==
=== Feature films ===
Year	English Title	Original Title	Notes
2016	Duck Neck	浮世千	
2020	Striding Into the Wind	野马分鬃	
2021	Ripples of Life	永安镇故事集	
2023	Only the River Flows	河边的错误	
2024	Mostly Sunny	阳光俱乐部	
2025	I Dreamed a Dream	青春梦	
TBA	Mr. Crane Is Back!	白鹤亮翅	Post-production

=== Short films ===
Year	English Title	Original Title	Notes
2018	On The Border	延边少年	

== Awards and nominations ==
Year	Association	Category	Nominated work	Result	Ref(s).
2018	Cannes Film Festival	Mention Spéciale	On The Border	Won	
2021	Pingyao International Film Festival	Fei Mu Award for Best Director	Ripples of Life	Won	
2023	Pingyao International Film Festival	Fei Mu Award for Best Film	Only the River Flows	Won	
2023	Cannes Film Festival	Un Certain Regard	Only the River Flows	Nominated	
