= Striding Into the Wind =

2020 road movie by Wei Shujun

- Directed by: Wei Shujun
- Release date: 2020
- Country: China

Striding Into the Wind (simplified Chinese: 野马分鬃; traditional Chinese: 野馬分鬃; pinyin: Yě mǎ fēn zōng) is a 2020 Chinese road movie directed by Wei Shujun.
