= 12th Asian Film Awards =

2018 edition of award ceremony

- Date: March 17, 2018
- Site: The Venetian Macao, Macau

Highlights
- Best Film: Youth
- Most awards: Legend of the Demon Cat (4)
- Most nominations: Legend of the Demon Cat (6)

The 12th Asian Film Awards are the 2018 edition of the Asian Film Awards. The ceremony was held on March 17, 2018, at the Venetian Hotel in Macau.

== Winners and nominees ==
Winners are listed first and highlighted in bold.

Best Film	Best Director
**Youth** (China); Angels Wear White (China) (France); Newton (India); The Day After (South Korea); The Third Murder (Japan)	**Yuya Ishii – The Tokyo Night Sky Is Always the Densest Shade of Blue** (Japan); Chen Kaige – Legend of the Demon Cat (China); Sylvia Chang – Love Education (Taiwan); Ann Hui – Our Time Will Come (Hong Kong); Hong Sang-soo – The Day After (South Korea); Feng Xiaogang – Youth (China)
Best Actor	Best Actress
**Louis Koo – Paradox** (Hong Kong); Kim Yoon-seok – 1987: When the Day Comes (South Korea); Sukollawat Kanarot – Malila: The Farewell Flower (Thailand); Rajkummar Rao – Newton (India); Duan Yihong – The Looming Storm (China)	**Sylvia Chang – Love Education** (Taiwan); Yū Aoi – Birds Without Names (Japan); Marsha Timothy – Marlina the Murderer in Four Acts (Indonesia); Kim Min-hee – The Day After (South Korea); Zhou Dongyu – This Is Not What I Expected (China)
Best Supporting Actor	Best Supporting Actress
**Yang Ik-june – Wilderness** (South Korea); Yoo Hae-jin – A Taxi Driver (South Korea); Geng Le – Angels Wear White (China); Tian Zhuangzhuang – Love Education (China); Eddie Peng – Our Time Will Come (Taiwan)	**Kitty Zhang – Legend of the Demon Cat** (China); Choi Hee-seo – Anarchist from Colony (South Korea); Hana Sugisaki – Blade of the Immortal (Japan); Wu Yanshu – Love Education (China); Suzu Hirose – The Third Murder (Japan)
Best New Director	Best Newcomer
**Dong Yue – The Looming Storm** (China); Vivian Qu – Angels Wear White (China); Anucha Boonyawatana – Malila: The Farewell Flower (Thailand); Huang Hsin-yao – The Great Buddha + (Taiwan); Derek Hui – This Is Not What I Expected (Hong Kong); Yoshiyuki Kishi – Wilderness (Japan)	**Chutimon Chuengcharoensukying – Bad Genius** (Thailand); Zhou Meijun – Angels Wear White (China); Im Yoon-ah – Confidential Assignment (South Korea); Ling Man-lung – Tomorrow Is Another Day (Hong Kong); Akari Kinoshita – Wilderness (Japan); Elane Zhong – Youth (China)
Best Screenplay	Best Editing
**Mayank Tewari, Amit V Masurkar – Newton** (India); Hwang Seong-gu – Anarchist from Colony (South Korea); Tanida Hantaweewatana, Vasudhorn Piyaromina, Nattawut Poonpiriyai – Bad Genius (Thailand); Sylvia Chang, You Xiaoying – Love Education (Taiwan) (China); Yan Geling – Youth (China)	**Shin Min-kyung – The King** (South Korea); Li Nien-hsiu – Mon Mon Mon Monsters (Taiwan); Mary Stephen, Kwong Chi-leung – Our Time Will Come (Hong Kong) (China); Hirokazu Kore-eda – The Third Murder (Japan); Zhang Qi – Youth (China)
Best Cinematography	Best Original Music
**Kim Ji-yong – The Fortress** (South Korea); Cao Yu – Legend of the Demon Cat (China); Yunus Pasolang – Marlina the Murderer in Four Acts (Indonesia); Nagao Nakashima – The Great Buddha+ (Taiwan); Takimoto Mikiya – The Third Murder (Japan)	**Joe Hisaishi – Our Time Will Come** (Hong Kong) (China); Jo Yeong-wook – A Taxi Driver (South Korea); Wen Zi – Angels Wear White (China); Lin Sheng Xiang – The Great Buddha+ (Taiwan); Taro Iwashiro – Wilderness (Japan)
Best Action Film	Best Costume Design
**Paradox** (Hong Kong); Along With the Gods: The Two Worlds (South Korea); Blade of the Immortal (Japan); Brotherhood of Blades II: The Infernal Battlefield (China); The Thousand Faces of Dunjia (Hong Kong) (China)	**Chen Tongxun – Legend of the Demon Cat** (China); Shim Hyun-sup – Anarchist from Colony (South Korea); Rama Rajamouli, Prashanti Tipirneni – Baahubali 2: The Conclusion (India); Yuya Maeda – Blade of the Immortal (Japan); Shirley Chan – The Thousand Faces of Dunjia (Hong Kong)
Best Production Design	Best Visual Effects
**Tu Nan, Lu Wei – Legend of the Demon Cat** (China); Lee Mok-won – Along with the Gods: The Two Worlds (South Korea); Frans Paat – Marlina the Murderer in Four Acts (Indonesia); Yohei Taneda – The Third Murder (Japan); Ben Luk – This Is Not What I Expected (Hong Kong)	**Norio Ishii – Legend of the Demon Cat** (China) (Japan) (Hong Kong); Jin Jong-hyun – Along with the Gods: The Two Worlds (South Korea); Ankur Sachedev – Baahubali 2: The Conclusion (India); Shingo Kobayashi – Gintama (Japan); Huang Mei-cing, Pao Cheng-hsun – Mon Mon Mon Monsters (Taiwan); Jang Seong-ho, Park Young-soo, Son Oh-young – The Thousand Faces of Dunjia (Hong Kong) (China)
Best Sound	AFA Next Generation Award
**Tu Du-chih, Wu Shu-yao – The Great Buddha+** (Taiwan); Wang Gang – Brotherhood of Blades II: The Infernal Battlefield (China); Khikmawan Santosa – Marlina the Murderer in Four Acts (Indonesia); Tu Du-chih, Wu Shu-yao, Tu Chun-tang – Mon Mon Mon Monsters (Taiwan); Choi Tae-young – The Fortress (South Korea)	**Im Yoona – Confidential Assignment (South Korea)**
Excellence In Asian Cinema Award	Lifetime Achievement Award
**Kara Hui** (Hong Kong)	**Sylvia Chang** (Taiwan)
2017 Highest-Grossing Asian Film Award	
**Wolf Warrior 2** (China)
