= Wu Yanshu =

Chinese actress (born 1938)

- 吴彦姝
- Born: 1938 (age 87–88); Guangzhou, Guangdong, China
- Occupation: Actress
- Years active: 1960s–present
- Agent: Shanxi Drama Theatre
- Children: 1

Chinese name
- Traditional Chinese: 吳彥姝
- Simplified Chinese: 吴彦姝
Transcriptions
Standard Mandarin
- Hanyu Pinyin: Wú Yànshū

Wu Yanshu (Chinese: 吴彦姝; born 1938) is a Chinese actress. Wu is considered a National Class-A Actor in China.

Wu first garnered recognition for her acting in 2016, when her performance in Finding Mr. Right 2 and earned her a Golden Horse Award nomination for Best Supporting Actress. Her film breakthrough came in 2017 with her performance as the grandmother in the drama film Love Education, for which she received Best Supporting Actress nominations at the 54th Golden Horse Awards, 37th Hong Kong Film Awards and 12th Asian Film Awards. For her role in Relocate, she won a Best Supporting Actress at the 31st Golden Rooster Awards, the Chinese equivalent of the Academy Awards.

== Early life ==
Born in 1938, Wu worked at Shanxi Drama Theatre since the 1960s. Premier Zhou Enlai invited her to perform Liu Hulan in the Great Hall of the People in Beijing. She retired in 2003. In 2011 she moved to Beijing, living with her daughter.

== Career ==
Wu's first major film credit was Stream Is Singing, playing the role of Gao Xiaoling. The drama film was produced by Changchun Film Studio.

In 1982, she guest-starred on Men of a Certain Age, a drama film starring Da Shichang and Pan Hong.

Wu had a supporting role in the comedy television series The Story of Xi Gengtian (2006), which starred Lin Yongjian as Xi Gengtian.

In 2011, Wu had a cameo appearance in Journey to the West, adapted from Wu Cheng'en's classical novel of Journey to the West, one of the Four Great Classical Novels in Chinese literature.

Wu appeared as Yu Lan in Love is Not Blind (2013), a romance drama starring Yao Di and Zhang Mo.

In 2016, Wu played the role of Tang Xiuyi in Xue Xiaolu's film Finding Mr. Right 2, for which she received a Best Supporting Actress nomination at the 53rd Golden Horse Awards.

Wu had key supporting role in the 2017 Love Education, directed by Sylvia Chang. She was praised for her role and earned critical acclaim for her performance. And she was nominated for Best Supporting Actress at the 54th Golden Horse Awards, 37th Hong Kong Film Awards and 12th Asian Film Awards. At the same year, Wu's performance in the feature film Relocate which garnered her a Best Supporting Actress at the 31st Golden Rooster Awards.

== Personal life ==
Wu's husband was a composer and chairman of Shanxi Provincial Musicians Association. Her daughter is a screenwriter.

== Filmography ==
=== Film ===
Year	English title	Chinese title	Role	Notes
1959	Stream Is Singing	流水欢歌	Gao Xiaoling	
1982	Men of a Certain Age	人到中年	Aunt Bai	
2011	The Faithful Brothers	信义兄弟	Mother	
2016	Finding Mr. Right 2	北京遇上西雅图之不二情书	Tang Xiuyi	
2017	Relocate	搬迁	Old Mrs. Ma	
2017	Love Education	相爱相亲	Grandmother (Yue Zengshi)	
2018	Last Letter	你好，之华	Chen Guizhi	
2018	Animal World	动物世界	Old woman	
2019		温暖之城之红日亭	Grandma Jin	
2019	Fagara	花椒之味	Grandmother	
2019	The Whistleblower	吹哨人	Gao's wife	
2020		旦后	Lin Bo'er (old)	
2021	Embrace Again	穿过寒冬拥抱你	Xie Yongqin	
2021	Tracing Her Shadow	又见奈良	Chen Huiming	
2021	A Hustle Bustle New Year	没有过不去的年	Song Baozhen	
2021	All About My Mother	关于我妈的一切	Grandmother	
2021	The Bamboo Hat	红尖尖	Grandmother	
2021		不老奇事	Su Lingfang	
2022	Only Fools Rush In	四海		
2022		请别相信她		
2022	Song of Spring	妈妈	Mother	

=== TV series ===
Year	English title	Chinese title	Role	Notes
2002	Love of Life and Death	生死之恋	Mother Wang	
2006	The Story of Xi Gengtian	喜耕田的故事	Mother of Xuan Zhu	
2009	At Middle Age	人到中年	Aunt Bai	
2010	Cellphone	手机	Mother of Wu Yue	
2011	Journey to the West	西游记	Pilanpo Bodhisattva	
2012	Police Story of Yingpan Town	营盘镇警事	Mother of Dang Yu	
2013	Raise Children to Provide Against Old Age	养儿防老	Grandma	
2013	Love is Not Blind	失恋三十三天	Yu Lan	
2014	Government Audit	国家审计	Mother of Zhou Weihai	
2017	Seeking Mr. Right	北京遇上西雅图	Grandma	
2018	When We Were Young	人不彪悍枉少年	grandmother of Hua Biao	
2018	Madhouse	疯人院	Zhao Yi	
2019	My True Friend	我的真朋友	Chen Bijun	
2020	My Best Friend's Story	流金岁月	Jiang Nansun's grandmother	
2020	Shichahai	什刹海	Aunt Zhong	
2021	Faith Makes Great	理想照耀中国	Yan Hongying (old)	
2021		美好的日子	Mrs. Jiang	
2024	Best Choice Ever	承欢记	Chen Shuzhen	

== Theater ==
Year	English title	Chinese title	Role	Notes
1960s	Liu Hulan	刘胡兰	Liu Hulan	
1960s	Sentinels Under Neon Lights	霓虹灯下的哨兵	Lin Yuanyuan	

== Awards and nominations ==
Year	Nominated work	Award	Result	Ref.
Beijing International Film Festival
2022	Song of Spring	Best Actress	Won	
Golden Horse Awards
2016	Finding Mr. Right 2	Best Supporting Actress	Nominated	
2017	Love Education	Best Supporting Actress	Nominated	
Golden Rooster Awards
2017	Relocate	Best Supporting Actress	Won	
Hong Kong Film Awards
2018	Love Education	Best Supporting Actress	Nominated	
Asian Film Awards
2018	Love Education	Best Supporting Actress	Nominated	
