= Gao Lishi =

Chinese eunuch and politician (684–762)

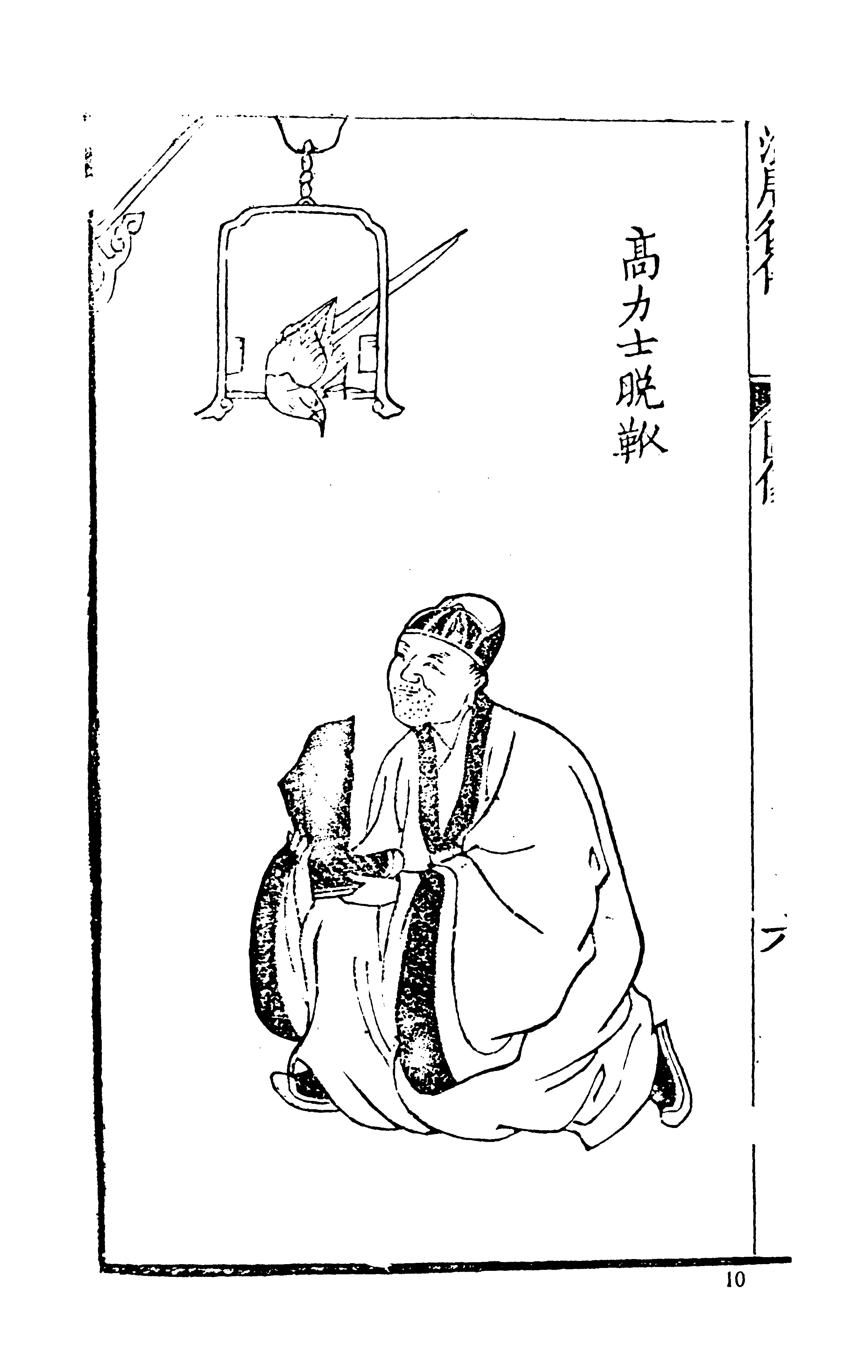
Gao Lishi

Gao Lishi (Chinese: 高力士; pinyin: Gāo Lìshì) (684 – c.May 762), born Feng Yuanyi (馮元一), noble title Duke of Qi (齊國公), was a Chinese eunuch and politician of the Tang dynasty and the Wu Zhou dynasty, becoming particularly powerful during Emperor Xuanzong of Tang's reign. He was in charge of many decisions that were supposed to be the emperor's responsibility during Emperor Xuanzong's later years, and was believed to have been richer than many of the nobility of the era. Despite this, however, he was often viewed as a positive example of eunuch participation in politics for his personal loyalty to Emperor Xuanzong, which withstood despite its putting himself in personal danger later, during the reign of Emperor Xuanzong's son Emperor Suzong (when Emperor Xuanzong was Taishang Huang (retired emperor)) as it drew jealousy from fellow eunuch Li Fuguo. Further, during the years of his highest power, he was also said to make no improper influences on governance, and therefore drew no anger from the intelligentsia. Late in Emperor Suzong's reign, he was exiled upon Li Fuguo's urging. After a pardon in 762, he was returning from exile, when he heard of Emperors Xuanzong's and Suzong's deaths. Mourning Emperor Xuanzong, he grew ill and died.

== Background ==
Gao Lishi was born in 684, when Empress Dowager Wu (later known as Wu Zetian) was successively regent over her sons Emperor Zhongzong (Li Zhe/Li Xian) and Emperor Ruizong (Li Dan). He was from Pan Prefecture (潘州, roughly modern Maoming, Guangdong). His was born Feng Yuanyi (馮元一), and he was reportedly a great-grandson of the early Tang local government official Feng Ang (馮盎). In 698, a local official, Li Qianli (李千里), submitted two young eunuchs to Wu Zetian, who had by that point taken the throne as Empress regnant as tribute; one was Lishi (who had not yet taken the name of Gao at this point), and one was named Jin'gang (金剛). Wu Zetian favored Lishi for his intelligence and kept him as an attending eunuch. Later, however, Lishi committed a minor fault, and she had him battered and expelled from her presence. An older eunuch, Gao Yanfu (高延福), took Lishi as an adoptive son (and thus had Lishi take his own name of Gao), and as Gao Yanfu had previously served Wu Zetian's powerful nephew Wu Sansi the Prince of Liang, he had Gao Lishi serve Wu Sansi. After about a year, Wu Zetian summoned him back to her palace, and he again attended her. He eventually grew to be exceedingly tall. As he was careful, he was put in charge of announcing imperial edicts, and was eventually promoted to be Gongwei Cheng (宮闈丞), a highly ranked eunuch.

During the subsequent return to the throne by Emperor Zhongzong, Gao Lishi cultivated a friendship with Emperor Zhongzong's nephew Li Longji the Prince of Linzi, the son of Li Dan the Prince of Xiang (Emperor Zhongzong's brother and former emperor). In 705, after Emperor Zhongzong's sudden death, Li Longji and Emperor Zhongzong's sister Princess Taiping overthrew Emperor Zhongzong's powerful wife Empress Wei and returned Li Dan to the throne. Li Longji was created crown prince, and he retained Gao on his staff.

== During Emperor Xuanzong's reign ==
In 712, Emperor Ruizong passed the throne to Li Longji, who took the throne as Emperor Xuanzong. However, Emperor Ruizong retained most of the imperial authority as Taishang Huang (retired emperor), and Princess Taiping, through him, continued to exert great influence on governance. As of 713, it was said that five of the seven chancellors at the time -- Dou Huaizhen, Cen Xi, Xiao Zhizhong, Cui Shi, and Lu Xiangxian, and three of the four generals of the Forbidden Troops at the time—Chang Yuankai, Li Ci, and Li Qin—were recommended by her (although Lu was not considered a follower of hers). Also, most of the officials and officers under chancellors and senior generals in the central government depended on her. With Emperor Xuanzong and Princess Taiping locked into a power struggle, Zhang Shuo, from his post at Luoyang, had a messenger present Emperor Xuanzong with his sword—meaning to tell him that it was time to take decisive action. Meanwhile, it was said that Princess Taiping, Dou, Cen, Xiao, and Cui; along with other officials Xue Ji, Li Jin (李晉) the Prince of Xinxing (a grandson of Li Deliang (李德良), a cousin of Tang's founder Emperor Gaozu), Li You (李猷), Jia Yingfu (賈膺福), Tang Jun (唐晙); the generals Chang Yuankai (常元楷), Li Ci (李慈), and Li Qin (李欽); and the monk Huifan (惠範), were plotting to overthrow Emperor Xuanzong. It was further said that they discussed, with the lady-in-waiting Yuan to poison the gastrodia elata that Emperor Xuanzong routinely took as an aphrodisiac. When this alleged plot was reported to Emperor Xuanzong by Wei Zhigu, Emperor Xuanzong, who had already received advice from Wang Ju (王琚), Zhang Yue, and Cui Riyong to act first, did so. He convened a meeting with his brothers Li Fan (李範) the Prince of Qi, Li Ye (李業) the Prince of Xue, Guo, along with a number of his associates — the general Wang Maozhong (王毛仲), the officials Jiang Jiao (姜皎) and Li Lingwen (李令問), his brother-in-law Wang Shouyi (王守一), Gao Lishi, and the military officer Li Shoude (李守德) — and decided to act first. On July 29, Emperor Xuanzong had Wang Maozhong take 300 soldiers to the imperial guard camp to behead Chang and Li Ci. Then, Jia, Li You, Xiao, and Cen were arrested and executed as well. Dou and Princess Taiping committed suicide. Emperor Ruizong turned over imperial authority to Emperor Xuanzong and thereafter was no longer involved in important decisions. As a result of Gao's participation in this action against Princess Taiping and her party, Emperor Xuanzong awarded him by making him a general of the imperial guards, as well as the acting head of the eunuch bureau (內侍省, Neishi Sheng). Gao's general commission made Gao the first eunuch in Tang history to carry the third rank in Tang's nine-rank system, and this was viewed as the start of the rise of eunuchs.

Afterwards Gao became one of Emperor Xuanzong's closest confidants, and it was often Gao that Emperor Xuanzong sent to communicate his wishes with key officials. For example, later in 713, when the chancellor Yao Chong was initially surprised and dismayed when Emperor Xuanzong refused to discuss the commissions of low-level officials with him, Gao spoke with Emperor Xuanzong and was told that the reason was not that he was displeased with Yao, but rather that these were decisions that Yao himself, as chancellor, had the authority to make. After Gao informed Yao this, Yao's apprehensions were dissolved. In 726, when Zhang Shuo was accused of corruption and arrested, it was Gao that Emperor Xuanzong sent to visit Zhang to see how he was doing, and it was at Gao's subsequent intercession that Zhang's punishment was reduced.

In 730, when Emperor Xuanzong was beginning to be apprehensive about Wang Maozhong's power and arrogance, it was Gao who suggested that he act first, and in spring 731, Emperor Xuanzong exiled Wang and his associates, and subsequently forced Wang to commit suicide. Thereafter it was said that Gao was particularly trusted by Emperor Xuanzong, who remarked, "If Gao Lishi is here, I can sleep securely." Gao therefore rarely returned to his own home, and the petitions submitted to Emperor Xuanzong were first screened by Gao before he would pass them on to Emperor Xuanzong—and Gao ruled on the less important matters himself, causing his power to rise immensely. He spent much effort to support his adoptive parents Gao Yanfu and Gao Yanfu's wife. He also had the commander (jiedushi) of Lingnan Circuit locate his birth mother Lady Mai and send her to the capital Chang'an, so that he could support her. When Lady Mai died, the general Cheng Boxian (程伯獻) and the official Feng Shaozheng (馮紹正), who had sworn to be brothers with Gao Lishi, both mourned her deeply. Gao Lishi's father-in-law Lü Xuanwu (呂玄晤) was promoted quickly, as were his brothers and sons, and when Gao Lishi's wife Lady Lü died, the officials and the ordinary citizens all mourned her, to impress Gao. However, it was said that while Gao was powerful, he was careful and modest, and therefore continuously drew trust from Emperor Xuanzong. Among officials and generals who ingratiated him and had him help their advancements were Yuwen Rong, Li Linfu, Li Shizhi, Gai Jiayun (蓋嘉運), Wei Jian (韋堅), Yang Shenjin (楊慎矜), Wang Hong (王鉷), Yang Guozhong, An Lushan, An Sishun, and Gao Xianzhi. The intelligentsia at the time blamed him for the advancement of some of the more power-hungry officials, but also recognized that whenever officials associated with him were charged with crimes, he would not improperly intercede to save them.

In 737, Emperor Xuanzong's favorite concubine Consort Wu, trying to have her son Li Mao (李瑁) the Prince of Shou made crown prince, made false accusations against Li Ying the Crown Prince, as well as two other princes, Li Yao (李瑤) the Prince of E and Li Ju (李琚) the Prince of Guang. Li Ying, Li Yao, and Li Ju were deposed and then forced to commit suicide. Consort Wu died later that year, but Li Linfu, who was then chancellor and who was allied with her, continued to lobby on Li Mao's behalf. Instead, Emperor Xuanzong was considering an older son, Li Yu the Prince of Zhong, but could not decide quickly, and was depressed over the matter as well as his killing of three of his own sons. He could not sleep well or eat well. Gao asked him the reason, and he responded, "You are my old servant. Can you not tell?" Gao responded, "Is it that the position of young master [(i.e., crown prince)] has not been decided?" He responded, "Yes." Gao responded, "You do not need to trouble your heart. Just select the oldest one, and no one would dare to dispute it." Emperor Xuanzong therefore made up his mind, and he selected Li Yu (whose name was later changed to Li Heng) as crown prince.

Meanwhile, it was customary for Tang emperors to rotate their residences between Chang'an and the eastern capital Luoyang, depending on the amount of harvests for the year, as it was easier to transport food supplies to Luoyang than Chang'an. However, after Emperor Xuanzong last returned to Chang'an from Luoyang in 736, he did not visit Luoyang again. Li Linfu knew that he, in his more advanced age (he was 49 as of 736), tired of the rotation, and therefore expended effort to build up food supplies within the Guanzhong region, centered around Chang'an. By 744, on one occasion, Emperor Xuanzong commented to Gao:

It has been almost 10 years since I have left Chang'an. The realm is peaceful, and I want to rest and do nothing, giving governance to Li Linfu. What do you think?

Gao, who did not trust Li Linfu, responded:

Since ancient times, it was customary for the Son of Heaven to visit places throughout the realm. In addition, the powers of governance should not be easily given to others. If his authority is established, who would dare to oppose him?

Emperor Xuanzong was displeased, and Gao bowed and stated, "I am insane. I did not know what I said, and I should be killed." Emperor Xuanzong tried to make light of the situation by holding a feast for Gao, but Gao did not dare to discuss governmental matters with Emperor Xuanzong after this point.

In 746, there was an occasion when Emperor Xuanzong's new favorite concubine, Consort Yang Yuhuan, angered Emperor Xuanzong by being jealous and rude to him, and he had her sent to the mansion of her cousin Yang Xian (楊銛). Later that day, however, his mood was such that he could not eat, and the servants were battered by him for minor offenses. Gao knew that he missed Consort Yang, and Gao requested that the treasures in Consort Yang's palace be sent to her. Emperor Xuanzong agreed, and further sent imperial meals to her as well. That night, Gao requested that Emperor Xuanzong welcome Consort Yang back to the palace, a request that Emperor Xuanzong easily agreed to. Thereafter, she was even more favored, and no other imperial consort drew the favor of Emperor Xuanzong.

Meanwhile, it was said that Li Linfu did not have a good relationship with Li Heng the Crown Prince. Gao often protected Li Heng from Li Linfu's machinations however, and as such Li Heng's position was never actually endangered. As a result, Li Heng referred to Gao as an older brother. The other princes and dukes referred to him as "father," and Emperor Xuanzong's sons-in-law referred to him as "master." By 748, he was given the very high general rank of Piaoqi Da Jiangjun (驃騎大將軍) and was also awarded the title of Duke of Bohai.

In 750, there was another occasion at which Consort Yang offended Emperor Xuanzong with her words, and he sent her back to her clan. The official Ji Wen (吉溫) told Emperor Xuanzong that he overreacted, and Emperor Xuanzong regretted his actions. He against sent imperial meals to her, and she wept to the eunuchs delivering the meal, stating:

My offense deserves death, and it is fortunate that His Imperial Majesty did not kill me, but instead returned me to my household. I will forever leave the palace. My gold, jade, and treasures were all given me by His Imperial Majesty, and it would be inappropriate for me to offer them back to him. Only what my parents gave me I would dare to offer.

She cut off some of her hair and had the hair taken back to Emperor Xuanzong. Emperor Xuanzong had Gao escort her back to the palace, and thereafter loved her even more.

In 752, when associates of Wang Hong's brother Wang Han (王銲) plotted treason and rose in rebellion inside Chang'an, the troops commanded by Yang Guozhong (Consort Yang's cousin) and Wang Hong were initially unable to crush Wang Han's associates, but Gao then arrived with reinforcements and crushed the rebellion decisively. In the aftermaths, when Wang Hong hesitated at asking for punishment for his brother, Yang Guozhong accused Wang Hong of being complicit, and both Wang Hong and Wang Han were executed. Later that year, when Emperor Xuanzong, seeing that Geshu Han, the commander of Longyou Circuit (隴右, headquartered in modern Haidong Prefecture, Qinghai), had poor relations with An Lushan, then the commander of Fanyang Circuit (范陽, headquartered in modern Beijing) and An Sishun (whose uncle was An Lushan's stepfather), then the commander of Shuofang Circuit (朔方, headquartered in modern Yinchuan, Ningxia), and wanted to improve relations between these three key border troop commanders, he summoned all three to the capital and had Gao host a feast for the three of them, trying to get them to resolve their unpleasantries. However, instead, at the feast, Geshu and An Lushan got into an argument, which only stopped after Gao gazed at Geshu, stopping him from responding to An Lushan's insults.

By 754, Yang Guozhong, who was then chancellor, was beginning to repeatedly accuse An Lushan of plotting rebellion, claiming that if Emperor Xuanzong summoned An to the capital, An would surely not come. Instead, when Emperor Xuanzong summoned An to the capital in early 754, An came. Emperor Xuanzong considered making him chancellor as well—even having the official Zhang Ji (張垍, Zhang Shuo's son) draft an edict to that effect—but eventually did not do so. When An was set to return to Fanyang, Emperor Xuanzong had Gao hold a feast for An to send him off. After the feast, Gao observed to Emperor Xuanzong that An was somewhat displeased, perhaps because he had found out that he was originally set to be made chancellor but was not. Emperor Xuanzong, believing Zhang Ji and his brothers Zhang Jun (張均) and Zhang Shu (張埱) to have leaked the news, demoted all of them. Meanwhile, there was a war in the southwest between Tang forces and Nanzhao, which was not going well for Tang, and 200,000 soldiers had died in the conflict. Yang Guozhong, however, was hiding the truth from Emperor Xuanzong and declaring that there had been numerous victories. In response, Emperor Xuanzong told Gao:

I am old now. I entrust the governmental matters to the chancellors, and the border matters to the generals. I do not worry about them.

Gao responded, however, as he saw trouble brewing:

I heard that we were suffering repeated losses in Yunnan, and the border generals are wielding too much power. How can Your Imperial Majesty control the situation? If a rebellion erupts, there is no way to stop it. How can you have no worries?

Emperor Xuanzong began to be concerned, but took no decisive action, instead stating, "Do not speak further. Let me think about these things."

At the time, Yang Guozhong was also hiding a major flood from Emperor Xuanzong. Once, when Emperor Xuanzong was alone with Gao, he stated, "The rains would not stop. Speak what you will." Gao responded, "Since Your Imperial Majesty trusted all power to the chancellors, the rewards and punishments are out of hand, and the yin and yang are out of alignment. How would I dare to speak?"

Meanwhile, Yang Guozhong repeatedly tried to provoke An into rebelling, including arresting and executing staff members at An's mansion in Chang'an. In 755, An finally did. In 756, after Geshu was defeated by An's forces, after being forced by Yang Guozhong to engage An, Tong Pass, the last major defense against An's forces, fell to An. Yang Guozhong suggested fleeing to Chengdu, the capital of Jiannan Circuit, of which Yang Guozhong was commander. On July 14, Emperor Xuanzong, keeping the news secret from the people of Chang'an, took the imperial guards to escort him, Consort Yang, her family, and his immediate clan members, and exited Chang'an, heading toward Chengdu. Attending him were Yang Guozhong, his fellow chancellor Wei Jiansu, the official Wei Fangjin (魏方進), the general Chen Xuanli (陳玄禮), and some eunuchs and ladies in waiting close to him, including Gao.

On July 15, Emperor Xuanzong's train reached Mawei Station (馬嵬驛, in modern Xianyang, Shaanxi). The imperial guards were not fed and were angry at Yang Guozhong. Chen also believed that Yang Guozhong provoked this disaster and planned to carry him—and reported his plans to Li Heng through Li Heng's eunuch Li Fuguo, but Li Heng was hesitated and gave no approval. Meanwhile, emissaries of the Tibetan Empire, who had followed Emperor Xuanzong south, were meeting with Yang Guozhong and complaining that they were also not fed. The imperial guard soldiers took this opportunity to proclaim that Yang Guozhong was planning treason along with the Tibetan emissaries, and they killed him, along with his son Yang Xuan (楊暄), the Ladies of Han and Qin, and Wei Fangjin. Wei Jiansu was also nearly killed, but was spared at the last moment with severe injuries. The soldiers then surrounded Emperor Xuanzong's pavilion, and refused to scatter even after Emperor Xuanzong came out to comfort them and order them to scatter. Chen publicly urged him to put Consort Yang to death—which Emperor Xuanzong initially declined. After Wei Jiansu's son Wei E (韋諤) and Gao Lishi spoke further, Emperor Xuanzong finally resolved to do so. He therefore had Gao take Consort Yang to a Buddhist shrine and supervise her forced suicide by strangling. After he showed the body to Chen and the other imperial guard generals, the guard soldiers finally scattered and prepared for further movement. The imperial guards eventually escorted Emperor Xuanzong to Chengdu. Gao continued to attend to him there. For Gao's faithfulness, Emperor Xuanzong created him the Duke of Qi.

== During Emperor Suzong's reign ==
Li Heng, however, broke away from Emperor Xuanzong's party and fled to Shuofang instead, and was proclaimed emperor there (as Emperor Suzong) later in 756, a proclamation that Emperor Xuanzong recognized, as he assumed the title of Taishang Huang and had only relatively limited authority thereafter.

In 757, after Emperor Suzong recaptured Chang'an, he welcomed Emperor Xuanzong back to Chang'an. Gao Lishi accompanied Emperor Xuanzong back to the capital, and was rewarded with the honorific title Kaifu Yitong Sansi (開府儀同三司).

After Emperor Xuanzong's return to Chang'an, he took residence at Xingqing Palace (興慶宮), which was converted from his residence as an imperial prince. Gao and Chen Xuanli attended to him, as did Emperor Xuanzong's younger sister Li Chiying (李持盈) the Princess Yuzhen, the lady in waiting Ru Xianyuan (如仙媛), and the eunuchs Wang Cheng'en (王承恩) and Wei Yue (魏悅). Meanwhile, Li Fuguo had become very powerful, but these attendants of Emperor Xuanzong did not respect him. To retaliate, Li Fuguo began to try to convince Emperor Suzong that Emperor Xuanzong and his attendants were plotting to seize power back. In 760, with Emperor Suzong's tacit, although not explicit, approval, on one occasion when Emperor Xuanzong was out riding, Li Fuguo intercepted him and forced him to move back to the main palace. Even on that occasion, however, Gao would not submit to Li Fuguo, and even yelled at Li Fuguo to force him to get off his horse and to escort Emperor Xuanzong on foot, along with Gao. Soon after Emperor Xuanzong was forcibly moved, Li Fuguo forced Chen to retire, Li Chiying to return to her temple (she had become an ordained Taoist nun in 711), and exiled Gao, Wang, Wei, and Ru. In Gao's case, he was exiled to Wu Prefecture (巫州, roughly modern Huaihua, Hunan).

== Death ==
In spring 762, Emperor Suzong, then seriously ill, declared a general pardon. Gao Lishi was therefore allowed to return to Chang'an, and he began to undertake the journey. While he was on the way back to Chang'an, however, on May 5, Emperor Xuanzong died, followed by Emperor Suzong on May 16. When Gao reached Lang Prefecture (朗州, roughly modern Changde, Hunan), he heard of the two emperors' deaths, and he, mourning Emperor Xuanzong bitterly, spit up blood and died soon afterwards.

Emperor Suzong's son Emperor Daizong, who became emperor after Emperor Suzong's death, recognizing Gao's faithfulness and prior protection of Emperor Suzong, posthumously restored his titles and further bestowed honors, and buried him near Emperor Xuanzong's tomb.

== In fiction and popular culture ==
- Portrayed by Liu Kai-chi in The Legend of Lady Yang. (2000)
- Portrayed by Evergreen Mak in TVB's Whatever it Takes. (2001)

== See also ==
- Li Bai

== Notes and references ==
- Old Book of Tang, vol. 184.
- New Book of Tang, vol. 207.
- Zizhi Tongjian, vols. 210, 212, 213, 214, 215, 216, 217, 218, 221, 222.
