= Song of Spring (2022 film) =

- Theatrical release poster
- Traditional Chinese: 媽媽
- Simplified Chinese: 妈妈
- Hanyu Pinyin: Māmā
- Directed by: Yang Lina
- Written by: Yang Lina
- Produced by: Yin Lu
- Starring: Wu Yanshu; Xi Meijuan
- Cinematography: Yu Jing-pin
- Edited by: Zhu Lin
- Music by: Björn Shen
- Production companies: Zhejiang Hengdian Film Co., Ltd.; Tianjin Lianrui Film Co., Ltd.; Tianjin Zoe Film Co., Ltd.; China Film Corporation; Beijing Weimengchuangke Network Technology Co., Ltd.; Lian Ray Pictures
- Distributed by: Lian Ray Pictures
- Release date: 10 September 2022 (China)
- Running time: 109 minutes
- Country: China
- Language: Mandarin

Song of Spring (Chinese: 妈妈; pinyin: Māmā) is a 2022 Chinese drama film written and directed by Yang Lina and starring Wu Yanshu and Xi Meijuan. The film tells the family story of an 85-year-old mother caring for a 65-year-old daughter with Alzheimer's disease. Song of Spring premiered in China on 10 September 2022.

== Cast ==
- Wu Yanshu as Mother
- Xi Meijuan as Daughter who has Alzheimer's disease.
- Wen Qi as Zhou Xia
- Zhu Shimao as Doctor
- Li Xiaochuan as Police
- Ren Luomin as Father
- Yang Enyou as Child

== Soundtrack ==
No.	Title	Lyrics	Music	Singer(s)	Length
1.	"Mother's Love (世上只有妈妈好)" (Ending theme)	Li Juanqing	Liu Hongyuan/ Qianlei	Qian Lei
2.	"Be Thankful (感恩)" (Interlude)	HZ	HZ	Tao Yi

== Release ==
Song of Spring was theatrically released on 10 September 2022.

== Reception ==
Douban, a major Chinese media rating site, gave the drama 7.5 out of 10.

== Accolades ==
Date	Award	Category	Recipient(s) and nominee(s)	Result	Notes
2022	12th Beijing International Film Festival	Tiantan Award	Song of Spring	Nominated	
2022	12th Beijing International Film Festival	Best Actress	Wu Yanshu	Won	
2022	35th Golden Rooster Awards	Best Actress	Xi Meijuan	Won	
2023	14th China Film Director's Guild Awards	Best Actress	Wu Yanshu	Won	
2023	14th China Film Director's Guild Awards	Best Actress	Xi Meijuan	Won	
