= Angels Wear White =

2017 film

- Film poster
- Traditional Chinese: 嘉年華
- Simplified Chinese: 嘉年华
- Literal meaning: Carnival
- Hanyu Pinyin: Jiā Nián Huá
- Directed by: Vivian Qu
- Written by: Vivian Qu
- Produced by: Sean Chen
- Starring: Vicky Chen; Zhou Meijun
- Cinematography: Benoît Dervaux
- Edited by: Yang Hongyu
- Music by: Wen Zi
- Production company: 22 Hours Films
- Release date: 7 September 2017 (Venice)
- Running time: 107 minutes
- Countries: China; France
- Language: Mandarin

Angels Wear White (Chinese: 嘉年华) is a 2017 Chinese drama film directed by Vivian Qu. It was screened in the main competition section of the 74th Venice International Film Festival.

== Plot ==
Mia (Vicky Chen), a teenager, works as a cleaner in a motel in a small seaside town. One night, while manning the reception for her co-worker Lili (Peng Jing), she witnesses the sexual assault of two 12-year-old schoolgirls by a middle-aged man. Through the surveillance TV, she sees the man forcing himself into the girls' room and records the whole incident with her mobile phone.

== Cast ==
- Vicky Chen as Mia (Xiaomi)
- Zhou Meijun as Xiaowen
- Shi Ke as Attorney Hao
- Liu Weiwei as Xiaowen's mother
- Geng Le as Xiaowen's father
- Jiang Xinyue as Zhang Xinxin
- Peng Jing as Lili
- Wang Yuexin
- Li Mengnan
- Bamboo Chen

== Release ==
It opened the 28th Singapore International Film Festival (SGIFF) on 23 November 2017 at Marina Bay Sands, Singapore.

== Awards and nominations ==
Awards	Category	Recipient	Result	Ref.
25th Beijing College Student Film Festival	Jury Award	Angels Wear White	Won	
25th Beijing College Student Film Festival	Best Director	Vivian Qu	Nominated	
25th Beijing College Student Film Festival	Best Newcomer	Zhou Meijun	Nominated	
23rd Huading Awards	Best Film	Angels Wear White	Won	
23rd Huading Awards	Best Director	Vivian Qu	Nominated	
23rd Huading Awards	Best Screenwriter	Vivian Qu	Nominated	
9th China Film Director's Guild Awards	Best Film	Angels Wear White	Nominated	
9th China Film Director's Guild Awards	Best Director	Vivian Qu	Won	
9th China Film Director's Guild Awards	Best Screenwriter	Vivian Qu	Nominated	
9th China Film Director's Guild Awards	Best Actress	Vicky Chen	Nominated	
12th Asian Film Awards	Best Film	Angels Wear White	Nominated	
12th Asian Film Awards	Best Supporting Actor	Geng Le	Nominated	
12th Asian Film Awards	Best New Director	Vivian Qu	Nominated	
12th Asian Film Awards	Best Newcomer	Zhou Meijun	Nominated	
12th Asian Film Awards	Best Original Music	Wen Zi	Nominated	
54th Golden Horse Awards	Best Feature Film	Angels Wear White	Nominated	
54th Golden Horse Awards	Best Director	Vivian Qu	Won	
54th Golden Horse Awards	Best Leading Actress	Vicky Chen	Nominated	
38th Hong Kong Film Awards	Best Film from Mainland and Taiwan	Angels Wear White	Nominated	
