= Yang Lina (director) =

Chinese independent filmmaker (born 1972)

- Born: 1972 (age 53–54); Jilin, China
- Other name: Yang Tianyi
- Education: People's Liberation Army Academy of Art
- Occupation: Film director

Yang Lina
- Simplified Chinese: 杨荔钠
- Traditional Chinese: 楊荔鈉
Transcriptions
Standard Mandarin
- Hanyu Pinyin: Yáng Lìnà

Yang Lina is a Chinese independent filmmaker and performer whose films primarily deal with marginalized people, social issues, and feminism. Having shot documentary films for much of her career, she is a major contributor to the New Documentary Movement in China.

== Career ==
Yang was born in Jilin province in 1972. She graduated from the People's Liberation Army Academy of Art in 1995, beginning her career as a dancer and theater actress in a PLA drama troupe. She left in the mid-1990s, transitioning into filmmaking with her first documentary, Old Men (1999), which focused on the daily lives of a group of octogenarians in Beijing.

Established filmmakers in the New Documentary Movement at the time, such as Wu Wenguang and Zhang Yuan, typically used studio equipment and multi-person crews to shoot their documentaries. Following their example, Yang initially hired a cameraman and soundman, but, unhappy with their formal style, began shooting Old Men (1999) herself on the Panasonic EZ-1, a MiniDV camcorder. Her techniques and use of the DV (digital video) format's closer point of view impressed Wu, who mentored her and gave feedback on her project. As one of the first Chinese documentarians to adopt the format, Yang helped initiate the DV turn in the New Documentary Movement, "situating [herself] as an emblematic transitional figure". Old Men won multiple festival awards, including the Jury Award at the Cinéma du Réel and the Asian New Current Award at the Yamagata International Documentary Film Festival.

Her first acting role came in Jia Zhangke's Platform (2000), where she played Zhong Ping, a member of a performance troupe dealing with changes following the Cultural Revolution. The same year, her family history and parents' divorce was the subject of her second documentary, Home Video. During this period she went by the stage name "Yang Tianyi".

Yang turned to feature filmmaking in the 2010s, conceiving of a trilogy of women-focused films. It began with Longing for the Rain (2013), which portrayed female sexuality amidst economic and class issues; it was followed by Spring Tide (2019), a family drama about three generations of women and their conflicts, and concluded with Song of Spring (2022), about an elderly woman forced to take care of her daughter who has developed Alzheimer's disease.

Big World (2024), based on screenwriter You Xiaoying's personal experiences, starred Jackson Yee as a young man with cerebral palsy. It won the Audience Award at the 37th Tokyo International Film Festival.

Yang served on the jury of the 27th Shanghai International Film Festival in 2025.

== Filmography ==
=== As actor ===
Year	English title	Chinese title	Role	Notes
2000	Platform	站台	Zhong Ping	Credited as Yang Tianyi

=== As director ===
Year	English title	Chinese title	Notes
1999	Old Men	老头	Documentary; credited as Yang Tianyi
2000	Home Video	家庭录像带	Documentary
2007	Let's Dance Together	一起跳舞	Documentary
2008	My Neighbors and Their Japanese Ghosts	我的邻居说鬼子	Documentary
2008	Love Life of Mr. An	老安	Documentary
2009	Wild Grass of Qingdao	野草	Documentary
2013	Longing for the Rain	春梦	
2019	Spring Tide	春潮	
2022	Song of Spring	春歌 (also titled 妈妈!)	
2022	Leap of Faith	少女与马	Documentary
2024	Big World	小小的我	
2026	It's OK	我，许可	
