= 15th Asia Pacific Screen Awards =

Film awards ceremony

- Awarded for: Excellence in cinema and performance in Asia Pacific region
- Awarded by: Asia Pacific Screen Academy
- Presented by: UNESCO; FIAPF
- Date: 11 November 2022
- Site: Home of the Arts, Gold Coast, Australia
- Official website: www.asiapacificscreenawards.com

Highlights
- Best Film: Before, Now & Then
- Most awards: Return to Seoul (2)
- Most nominations: Before, Now & Then (4)

The 15th Asia Pacific Screen Awards was held on 11 November 2022 at the Home of the Arts, Gold Coast, Queensland, Australia.

== Jury ==
The juries are composed of:

International jury

- Guneet Monga, Indian film producer
- Mohamed Hefzy, Egyptian screenwriter and producer
- Numan Acar, German-Turkish actor and producer
- Sophie Hyde, Australian film director
- Vimukthi Jayasundara, Sri Lankan filmmaker and critic

International nominations council

- Hong-joon Kim, director of Korean Film Archive and a professor emeritus at Korea National University of Arts
- Anne Démy-Geroe, Australian film curator and lecturer
- Anderson Le, artistic director of Hawaii International Film Festival
- Beena Paul, Indian film editor
- Delphine Garde-Mroueh, film curator and researcher
- Gulnara Abikeyeva, Kazakh film critic and researcher
- Kiki Fung, programmer of Hong Kong International Film Festival

Youth, Animation, Documentary international jury

- Baby Ruth Villarama, Filipino documentarian and writer
- Shin Su-won, South Korean director and screenwriter
- Zhao Qi, Chinese documentary filmmaker
- Tearepa Kahi, New Zealand director

Youth, Animation, Documentary nominations council

- Meenakshi Shedde, Indian film curator
- Carl Joseph Papa, Filipino animation filmmaker
- Faramarz K-Rahber, Iranian-Australian filmmaker

== Winners and nominees ==
The nominations were announced on 12 October 2022.

- Winners denoted in **boldface** and with ‡

**Best Film**: **Before, Now & Then – Kamila Andini** (Indonesia) ‡; Poet – Darezhan Omirbaev (Kazakhstan); Return to Seoul – Davy Chou (Cambodia) (Qatar) (France) (Belgium) (Germany); This Is What I Remember – Aktan Arym Kubat (Kyrgyzstan) (Japan) (Netherlands) (France); When the Waves Are Gone – Lav Diaz (Philippines) (France) (Denmark) (Portugal)	**Best Director**: **Davy Chou – Return to Seoul** (Cambodia) (France) ‡; Kamila Andini – Before, Now & Then (Indonesia); Lav Diaz – When the Waves Are Gone (Philippines); Ameer Fakher Eldin – The Stranger (Syria); Shin Su-won – Hommage (South Korea)
**Best Performance**: **Lee Jung-eun – Hommage as Ji-wan** (South Korea) ‡; John Lloyd Cruz – When the Waves Are Gone as Hermes Papauran (Philippines); Aktan Arym Kubat – This Is What I Remember (Kyrgyzstan); Navid Mohammadzadeh – Beyond the Wall as Ali (Iran); Happy Salma – Before, Now & Then as Nana (Indonesia)	**Best Youth Film**: **Farha – Darin J. Sallam** (Jordan) (Palestine) (Saudi Arabia) (Sweden) ‡; Alam – Firas Khoury (Palestine) (Saudi Arabia) (Qatar) (France) (Tunisia); Hanging Gardens – Ahmed Yassin Al Daradji (Iraq) (Egypt) (Lebanon) (Palestine) (Saudi Arabia) (United Kingdom); Jaggi – Anmol Sidhu (India); Sweet As – Jub Clerc (Australia)
**Best Animated Film**: **Aurora's Sunrise – Inna Sahakyan** (Armenia) (Germany) (Lithuania) ‡; Dounia and the Princess of Aleppo – Marya Zarif and André Kadi (Canada); Goodbye, Don Glees! – Atsuko Ishizuka (Japan); Silver Bird and Rainbow Fish – Lei Lei (United States) (Netherlands) (China); To the Bright Side – Xiya Lan, Nianze Li, Yi Zhao, Kun Yu, Gaoxiang Liu, Maoning Liu and Chen Chen (China)	**Best Documentary Film**: **All That Breathes – Shaunak Sen** (India) (United States) (United Kingdom) ‡; Delikado – Karl Malakunas (Philippines) (Australia) (Hong Kong) (United States) (United Kingdom) (Special Mention); Blue Island – Chan Tze-woon (Hong Kong) (Japan); Children of the Mist – Diem Ha Le (Vietnam); Woodgirls – A Duet for a Dream – Azadeh Bizargiti (Iran) (Czech Republic)
**Best Screenplay**: **Makbul Mubarak – Autobiography** (Indonesia) ‡; Vahid Jalilvand – Beyond the Wall (Iran); Aktan Arym Kubat and Dalmira Tilepbergenova – This Is What I Remember (Kyrgyzstan); Darezhan Omirbaev – Poet (Kazakhstan); Park Chan-wook and Jeong Seo-kyeong – Decision to Leave (South Korea)	**Best Cinematography**: **Niklas Lindschau – The Stranger** (Germany) ‡; Batara Goempar – Before, Now & Then (Indonesia); Florent Herry – Snow and the Bear (France); Lv Songye – One and Four (China); Boris Troshev – Poet (Kazakhstan)
**Best New Performance** **Park Ji-min – Return to Seoul (South Korea) (France)** ‡	**Jury Grand Prize** **This Is What I Remember – Aktan Arym Kubat, Altynai Koichumanova, Denis Vaslin, Yuji Sadai, Carine Chichkowsky and Fleur Knopperts (Kyrgyzstan) (Japan) (Netherlands) (France)** ‡
**Cultural Diversity Award** **(under the patronage of UNESCO)** **Muru – Tearepa Kahi (New Zealand) ‡**	**Young Cinema Award** **(in partnership with NETPAC and Griffith Film School)** **Saim Sadiq for Joyland (Pakistan) ‡**
**FIAPF Award** **Nadine Labaki (Lebanon) ‡**
