= 16th Asian Film Awards =

2023 edition of award ceremony

- Teaser poster
- Awarded for: Excellence in Asian cinema
- Awarded by: Hong Kong International Film Festival; Busan International Film Festival; Tokyo International Film Festival
- Presented by: The Asian Film Awards Academy (AFAA)
- Announced on: Nominations: January 6, 2023
- Presented on: March 12, 2023
- Site: Hong Kong Jockey Club Auditorium, West Kowloon, Hong Kong
- Hosted by: Grace Chan; Sammy Leung
- Official website: Asian Film Awards

Highlights
- Best Picture: Drive My Car
- Excellence in Asian Cinema Award: Hiroshi Abe
- Best Direction: Hirokazu Kore-eda for Broker
- Best Actor: Tony Leung Chiu-wai; Where the Wind Blows
- Best Actress: Tang Wei; Decision to Leave
- Best Supporting Actor: Hio Miyazawa; Egoists
- Best Supporting Actress: Kim So-jin; Emergency Declaration
- Lifetime achievement: Sammo Hung
- Most awards: Decision to Leave and Drive My Car – 3
- Most nominations: Decision to Leave – 10

Television coverage
- Network: YouTube
- Duration: 5 hours 16 minutes

The 16th Asian Film Awards was held on March 12, 2023 at Hong Kong Jockey Club Auditorium in Hong Kong Palace Museum. The nominations were announced on January 6, 2023. At the 16th edition of the awards ceremony, 30 films from 22 regions and countries were shortlisted for 81 nominations. South Korean film Decision to Leave received 10 nominations most for any film whereas Drive My Car with eight nominations was second.

Lin Min Chen, a Malaysian Chinese singer, actor and model was appointed as Youth Ambassador of the film awards.

The award ceremony hosted by Grace Chan and Sammy Leung was held on 12 March 2023, where international actors and celebrities from Hong Kong walked the red carpet. Hiroshi Abe, Japanese model and actor, was presented with Excellence in Asian Cinema Award and 'Red Carpet Best Dressed Award', whereas AFA Next Generation Award was presented to Ji Chang-wook a South Korean actor and singer. Later, Sammo Hung, a martial arts veteran from Hong Kong was honoured with a Lifetime Achievement Award, and Tony Leung Chiu-wai, a Hong Kong actor and singer, was presented with Asian Film Contribution Award for his contribution to the Asian cinema and the best actor award for his performance in Where the Wind Blows. Drive My Car by Ryusuke Hamaguchi won the best film award and best direction was awarded to Hirokazu Kore-eda for Broker, whereas Tang Wei's performance in Decision to Leave got her the best actress award.

The ceremony was aired live on YouTube channel of Asian Film Awards Academy.

== Events ==
Asian Film Awards Academy is holding an exhibition to celebrate 15 Years of excellence of Asian Film Awards from 5 to 11 March, 2023 at Harbour City’s Ocean Terminal Main Concourse. It is a pre-event leading to the film awards ceremony. Vivian Sung, a Taiwanese actress and Lin Min Chen, a Malaysian Chinese singer, actor and AFA Youth Ambassador are invited on 11 March to interact with fans.

Japanese traditional martial arts dance group 'ORIENTARHYTHM' and talented pianist Niu Niu performed on stage during the ceremony.

=== Red Carpet Best Dressed Award ===
An award known as 'Best Dressed Award' is launched from this year ceremony. The award consists of a trophy designed by Hong Kong production and costume designer, William Chang and The Sail Melaka X iPANDAS Memorigin Tourbillon watch. Hiroshi Abe became the first recipient of the award.

Red Carpet Best Dressed Award Jury:

- Hun Kim, Designer Director of Karl Lagerfeld
- William Chang, Oscar-nominated and renowned HK Art Director
- Winnie Wan, editor-in-chief of Elle Hong Kong
- Michele Reis, renowned artist & co-creator of M Sail Tower
- Dato’ Leong Sir Ley, Founder & Chairman of Sheng Tai International

== Jury ==
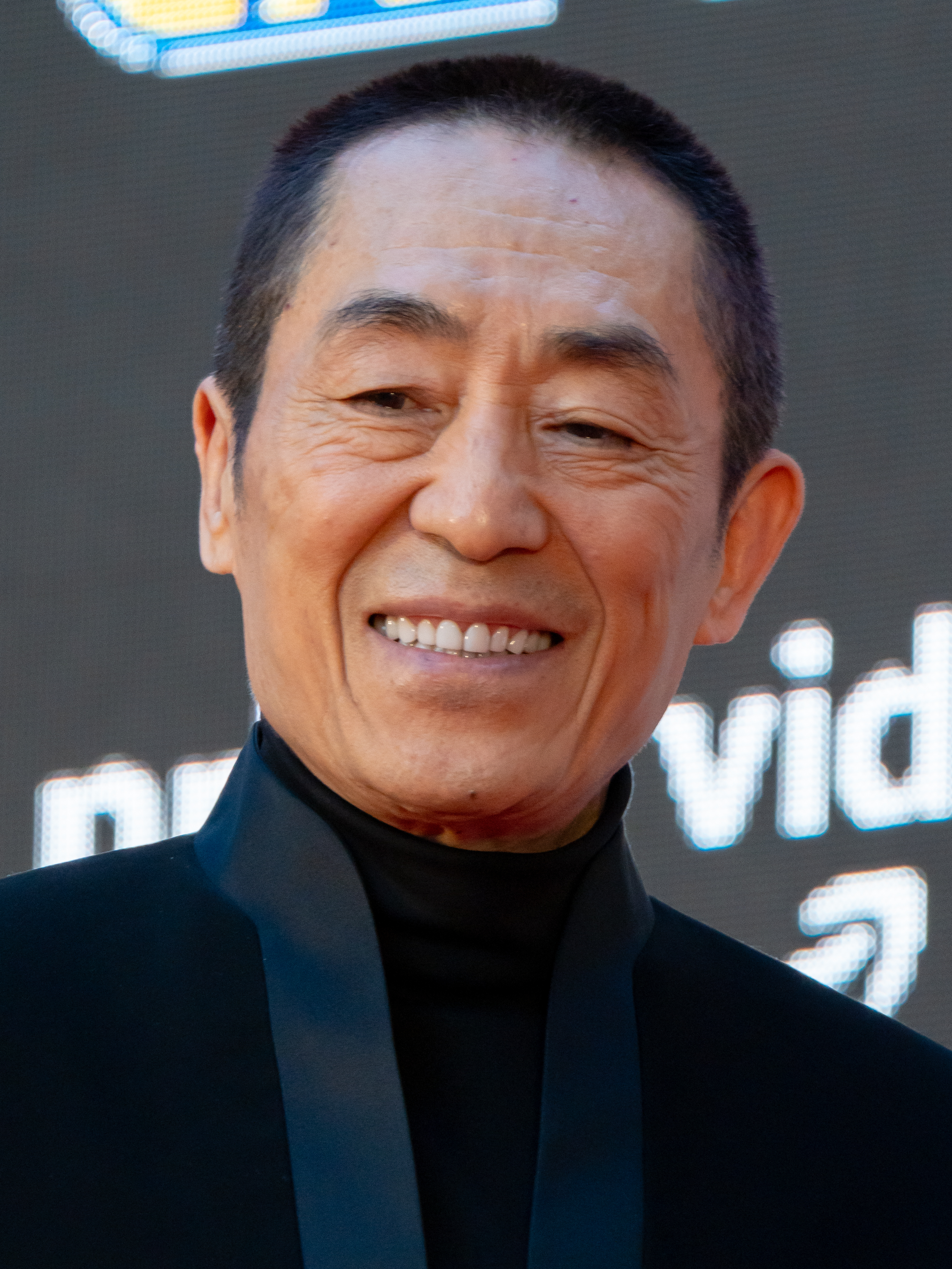
Zhang Yimou, President of jury

- Zhang Yimou (China) as Jury President - film director, producer, writer, actor and former cinematographer

== Awards and nominations ==
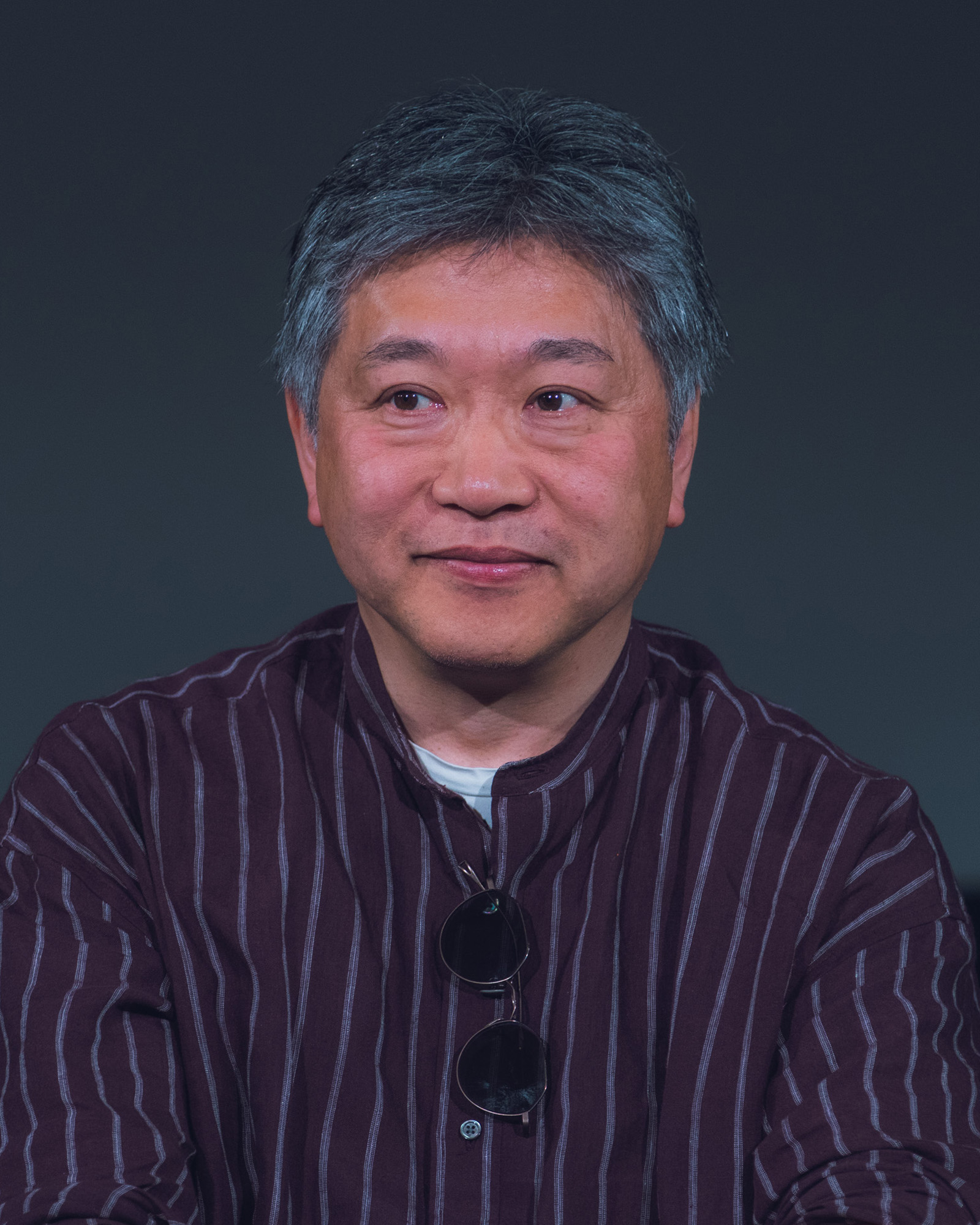
Hirokazu Kore-eda, winner of Best Director Award

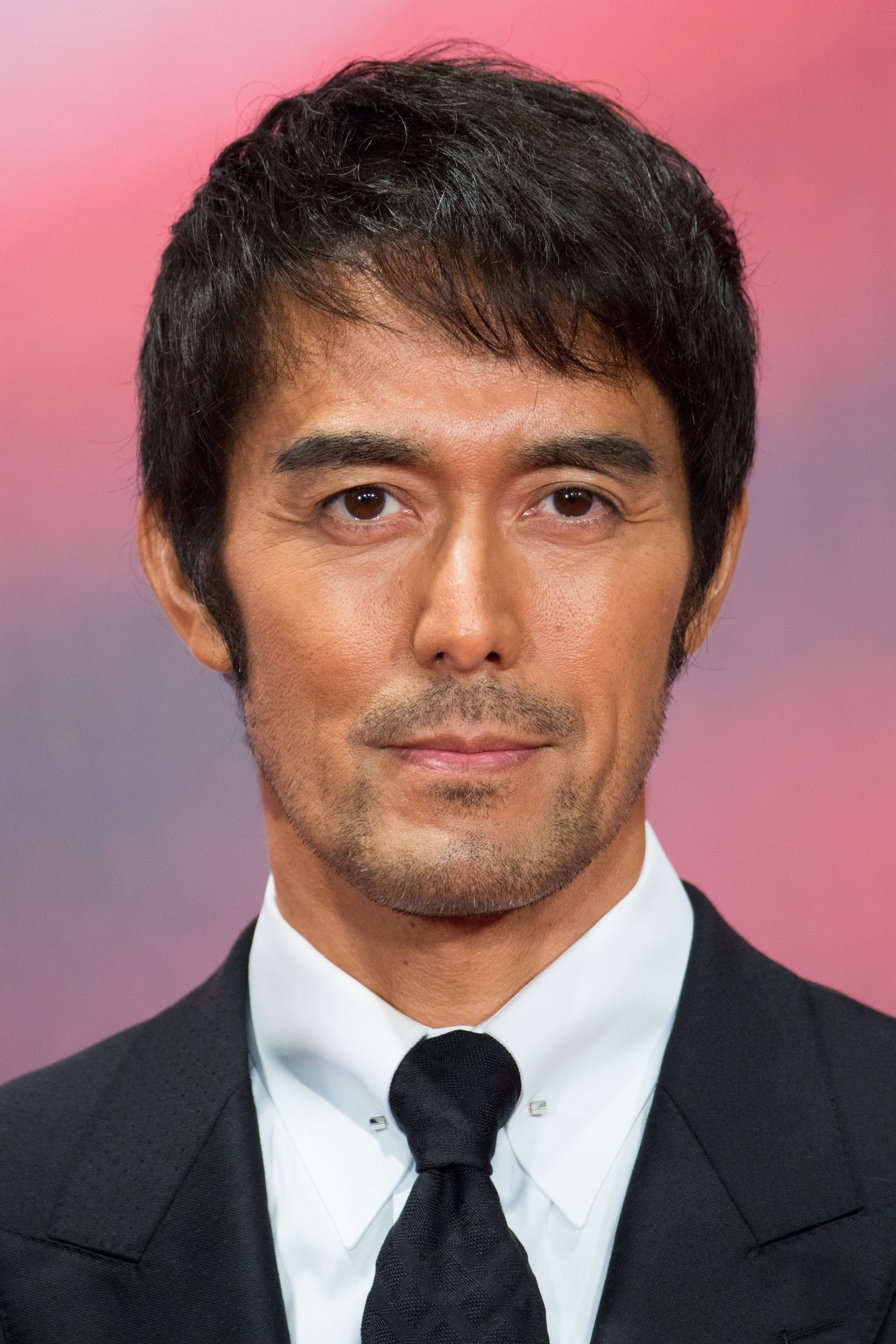
Hiroshi Abe, winner of Excellence in Asian Cinema and Best Dressed Awards

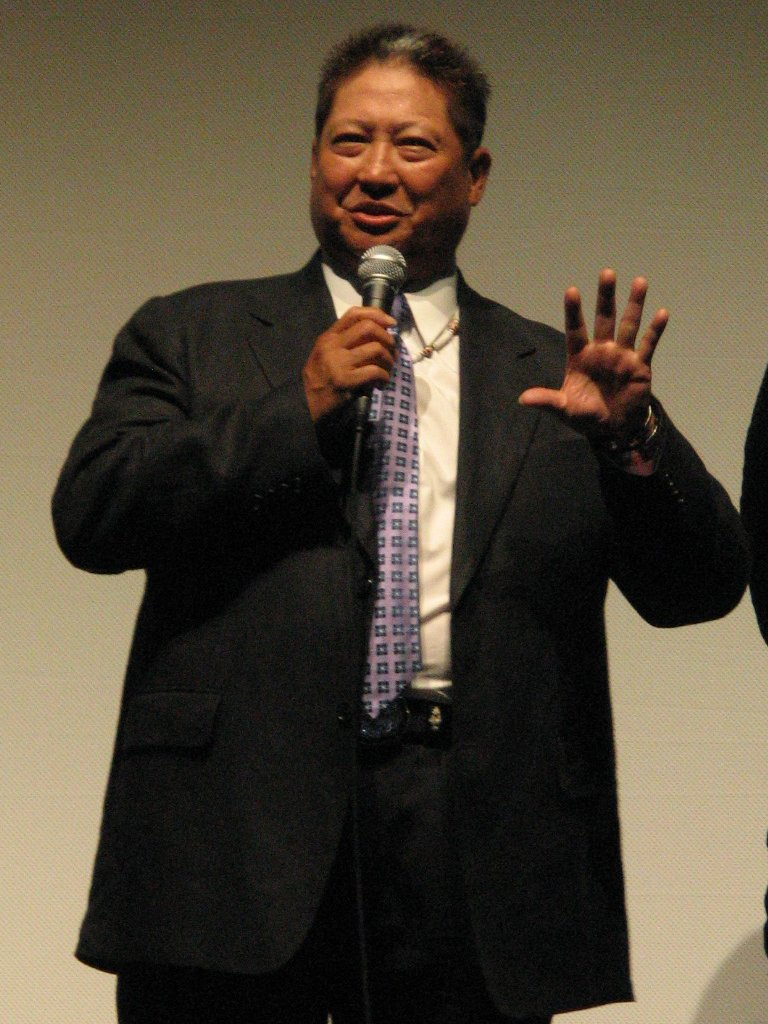
Sammo Hung, Lifetime Achievement Award recipient

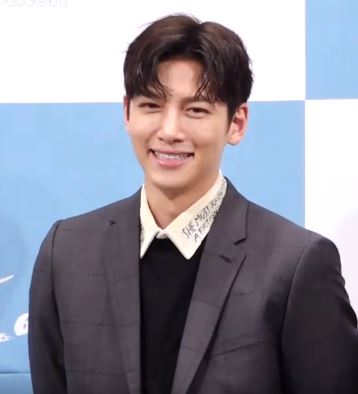
Ji Chang-wook, AFA Next Generation Award recipient

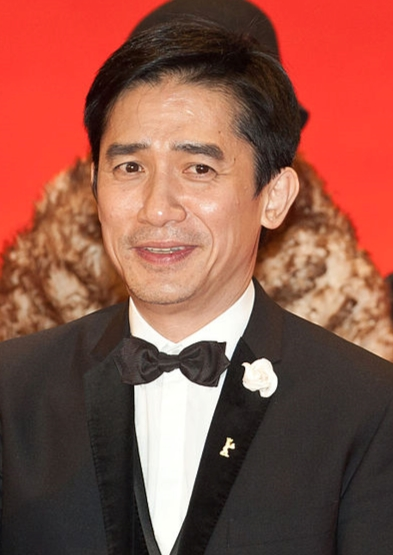
Tony Leung Chiu-wai, winner of Best Actor Award

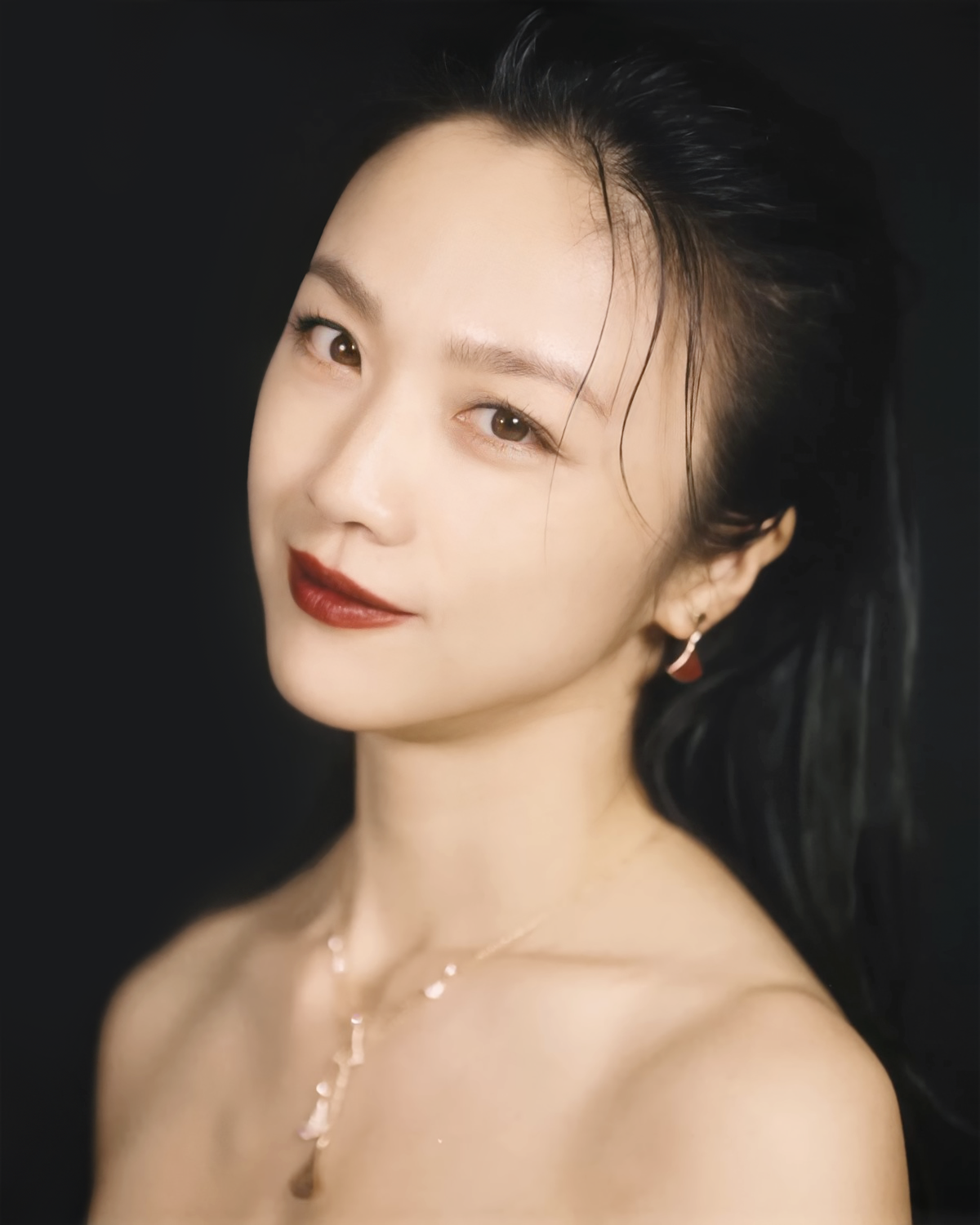
Tang Wei, winner of Best Actress Award

Complete list of nominees:

Winners are listed first and denoted in bold:

**Best Film**	**Best Director**
**Drive My Car** (Japan); Decision to Leave (South Korea); Ponniyin Selvan: I (India); Poet (Kazakhstan); When the Waves Are Gone (Philippines)	**Hirokazu Kore-eda – Broker** (South Korea); Ryusuke Hamaguchi – Drive My Car (Japan); Park Chan-wook – Decision to Leave (South Korea); Darezhan Omirbaev – Poet (Kazakhstan); Davy Chou – Return to Seoul (Cambodia)
**Best Actor**	**Best Actress**
**Tony Leung Chiu-wai – Where the Wind Blows as Nam Kong** (Hong Kong); Park Hae-il – Decision to Leave as Jang Hae-jun (South Korea); Hidetoshi Nishijima – Drive My Car as Yūsuke Kafuku (Japan); Ryohei Suzuki – Egoist as Kōsuke (Japan); Zhang Yi – Home Coming as Zong Dawei (China); Mohsen Tanabandeh – World War III as Shakib (Iran)	**Tang Wei – Decision to Leave as Song Seo-rae** (South Korea); Sylvia Chang – A Light Never Goes Out as Mei-heung (Hong Kong); Karena Lam – American Girl as Wang Li-li (Taiwan); Happy Salma – Before, Now & Then as Nana (Indonesia); Chieko Baisho – Plan 75 as Mishi Kakutani (Japan)
**Best Supporting Actor**	**Best Supporting Actress**
**Hio Miyazawa – Egoist as Ryūta** (Japan); Masaki Okada - – Drive My Car as Kōji Takatsuki Kafuku (Japan); Yim Si-wan – Emergency Declaration as Ryu Jin-seok (South Korea); Oh Kwang-rok – Return to Seoul as Freddie's biological father (Cambodia); Michael Hui – Where the Wind Blows as George Lee (Hong Kong)	**Kim So-jin – Emergency Declaration as Kim Hee-jin** (South Korea); Sakura Ando – A Man as Rie Taniguchi (Japan); Laura Basuki – Before, Now & Then as Ino (Indonesia); Yin Tao – Home Coming as Bai Hua (China); Yuumi Kawai – Plan 75 as Yoko Narimiya (Japan)
**Best New Director**	**Best Newcomer**
**Jigme Trinley – One and Four** (China); Makbul Mubarak - Autobiography (Indonesia); Saim Sadiq - Joyland (Pakistan); Chie Hayakawa – Plan 75 (Japan); Kim Se-in – The Apartment with Two Women (South Korea)	**Mak Pui-tung** – **The Sparring Partner** as **Angus Tong** (Hong Kong); Lee Ji-eun – Broker as Moon So-young (South Korea); Louise Wong - Anita as Anita Mui (Hong Kong); Yang En You – Lighting Up the Stars as Wu Xiao Wen (China); Park Ji-min – Return to Seoul as Frédérique "Freddie" Benoît (France)
**Best Screenplay**	**Best Editing**
**Chung Seo-kyung, Park Chan-wook – Decision to Leave** (South Korea); Makbul Mubarak - Autobiography (Indonesia); Ryusuke Hamaguchi, OE Takamasa – Drive My Car (Japan); Liu Jiangjiang, Yu Min – Lighting Up the Stars as Wu Xiao Wen (China); Lav Diaz – When the Waves Are Gone (Philippines)	**Azusa Yamazaki – Drive My Car** (Japan); Kim Sang-bum – Decision to Leave (South Korea); A. Sreekar Prasad – Ponniyin Selvan: I (India); Zhu Lin, Wei Yong, Gao Qiongjiali – Lighting Up the Stars (China); Dounia Sichov – Return to Seoul (Cambodia)
**Best Cinematography**	**Best Music**
**Lu Songye – One and Four** (China); Batara Goempar – Before, Now & Then (Indonesia); Kim Ji-yong – Decision to Leave (South Korea); Hideho Urata – Plan 75 (Japan); Ravi Varman – Ponniyin Selvan: I (India)	**Eiko Ishibashi – Drive My Car** (Japan); Jo Yeong-wook – Decision to Leave (South Korea); A. R. Rahman – Ponniyin Selvan: I (India); Jérémie Arcache, Christophe Musset – Return to Seoul (France); Bahman Ghobadi, Vedat Yildirim The Four Walls (Turkey)
**Best Costume Design**	**Best Production Design**
**Karen Yip, Dora NG - Anita** (Hong Kong); Ryu Hyun-min, Oh Jung-geun – Alienoid (South Korea); Retno Ratih Damayanti – Before, Now & Then (Indonesia); Shinozuka Nami - Egoist (Japan); Eka Lakhani – Ponniyin Selvan: I (India)	**Ryu Seong-hie – Decision to Leave** (South Korea); Vida Sylvia Theresia – Before, Now & Then (Indonesia); Li Miao – Home Coming (China); Thota Tharani – Ponniyin Selvan: I (India); Bill Lui, Andrew Wong – Where the Wind Blows (Hong Kong)
**Best Visual Effects**	**Best Sound**
**Chas Chau, Leung Wai Kit, Kwok Tai – Warriors of Future** (Hong Kong); Jung Seung-oh – Alienoid (South Korea); Zhang Fan – Moon Man (China); V. Srinivas Mohan – RRR (India); Atsuki Sato – Shin Ultraman (Japan)	**Tu Duu-Chih - Anita** (Hong Kong); Kim Suk-won – Decision to Leave (South Korea); Nomura Miki, Obo Tatsuya – Drive My Car (Japan); Vincent Villa – Return to Seoul (Cambodia); Ashwin Rajashekar – RRR (India)
**Excellence in Asian Cinema Award**	**Lifetime Achievement Award**
**Hiroshi Abe** (Japan)	**Sammo Hung** (Hong Kong)
**AFA Next Generation Award**	**Asian Film Contribution Award**
**Ji Chang-wook** (South Korea)	**Tony Leung Chiu-wai**

== Films with multiple nominations ==
The following films received multiple nominations:

Nominations	Films
10	Decision to Leave
8	Drive My Car
6	Ponniyin Selvan: I
6	Return to Seoul
5	Before, Now & Then
3	Where the Wind Blows
3	Egoist
3	Home Coming
3	Plan 75
3	Lighting Up the Stars
2	RRR
2	Autobiography
2	Poet
2	When the Waves Are Gone
2	Emergency Declaration
2	Alienoid
