= Poet (disambiguation) =

A poet is a person who writes poetry.

Poet or poets may also refer to:

- Poets (song), by The Tragically Hip
- "Poet", a song by Sly & the Family Stone from the album There's a Riot Goin' On
- "Poet", a song by Bastille from the album All This Bad Blood
- Arnold "Poet" Jackson, a fictional character
- SS Poet, a General G. O. Squier-class transport ship
- Poet (2021 film), a Kazakh-language film by Darezhan Omirbaev
- POET, an American biofuel company
- PoET, a Sun-observing telescope

== See also ==
- The Poet (disambiguation)
- The Poetess (disambiguation)
