= Student (film) =

2012 film

- Film poster
- Directed by: Darezhan Omirbaev
- Based on: Crime and Punishment by Fyodor Dostoyevsky
- Production company: Kazakhfilm
- Release date: 17 May 2012 (Cannes)
- Running time: 90 minutes
- Country: Kazakhstan
- Languages: Kazakh, Russian

Student (Kazakh: Студент, Stýdent) is a 2012 Kazakhstani drama film directed by Darezhan Omirbaev. It is an adaptation of Fyodor Dostoyevsky's 1866 novel Crime and Punishment. The film competed in the Un Certain Regard section at the 2012 Cannes Film Festival.

== Reception ==
Student has an approval rating of 67% on review aggregator website Rotten Tomatoes, based on 12 reviews, and an average rating of 6.4/10. Metacritic assigned the film a weighted average score of 63 out of 100, based on 6 critics, indicating "generally favorable reviews".

Leslie Felperin of Variety wrote: "As he did with Killer, Omirbayev once again offers a quietly scathing portrait of his homeland, which, on the evidence here, is on the verge of losing its soul in the pursuit of Range Rovers, banal soap operas and other ephemeral pleasures. ... [T]here's much to admire in the film's elegantly classical tempo and the way Omirbayev achieves so much with so little[.]"
