= Boston Society of Film Critics Award for Best Film =

Annual film award

The Boston Society of Film Critics Award for Best Film is one of the annual film awards given by the Boston Society of Film Critics.

== Winners ==
=== 1980s ===
Year	Winner	Director(s)
1980	Raging Bull	Martin Scorsese
1981	Pixote (Pixote: A lei do mais fraco)	Hector Babenco
1982	E.T. the Extra-Terrestrial	Steven Spielberg
1983	The Night of the Shooting Stars (La notte di San Lorenzo)	Paolo Taviani and Vittorio Taviani
1984	The Killing Fields	Roland Joffé
1985	Ran	Akira Kurosawa
1986	Blue Velvet	David Lynch
1987	Hope and Glory	John Boorman
1988	Bull Durham	Ron Shelton
1989	Crimes and Misdemeanors	Woody Allen

=== 1990s ===
Year	Winner	Director(s)
1990	Goodfellas	Martin Scorsese
1991	The Silence of the Lambs	Jonathan Demme
1992	Unforgiven	Clint Eastwood
1993	Schindler's List	Steven Spielberg
1994	Pulp Fiction	Quentin Tarantino
1995	Sense and Sensibility	Ang Lee
1996	Trainspotting	Danny Boyle
1997	L.A. Confidential	Curtis Hanson
1998	Out of Sight	Steven Soderbergh
1999	Three Kings	David O. Russell

=== 2000s ===
Year	Winner	Director(s)
2000	Almost Famous	Cameron Crowe
2001	Mulholland Drive	David Lynch
2002	The Pianist	Roman Polanski
2003	Mystic River	Clint Eastwood
2004	Sideways	Alexander Payne
2005	Brokeback Mountain	Ang Lee
2006	The Departed	Martin Scorsese
2007	No Country for Old Men	Joel Coen and Ethan Coen
2008	Slumdog Millionaire; WALL-E	Danny Boyle; Andrew Stanton
2009	The Hurt Locker	Kathryn Bigelow

=== 2010s ===
Year	Winner	Director(s)
2010	The Social Network	David Fincher
2011	The Artist	Michel Hazanavicius
2012	Zero Dark Thirty	Kathryn Bigelow
2013	12 Years a Slave	Steve McQueen
2014	Boyhood	Richard Linklater
2015	Spotlight	Thomas McCarthy
2016	La La Land	Damien Chazelle
2017	Phantom Thread	Paul Thomas Anderson
2018	If Beale Street Could Talk	Barry Jenkins
2019	Little Women	Greta Gerwig

=== 2020s ===
Year	Winner	Director(s)
2020	Nomadland	Chloé Zhao
2021	Drive My Car	Ryusuke Hamaguchi
2022	Return to Seoul	Davy Chou
2023	The Holdovers	Alexander Payne
2024	Anora	Sean Baker
2025	Sinners	Ryan Coogler
