= Park Ji-min (actress) =

South Korean and French actress (born 1988)

- Born: 1988 (age 36–37); Seoul, South Korea
- Education: École des Arts Décoratifs
- Occupations: Actress; visual artist
- Years active: 2022–present
- Known for: Return to Seoul

Park Ji-min (Korean: 박지민; born 1988) is a South Korean-born French actress and visual artist. She made her acting debut in Davy Chou's Return to Seoul (2022), for which she received nominations at the Asian Film Awards and Lumière Awards.

== Early life and education ==
Park Ji-Min was born in Seoul in 1988, where she lived until the age of 9. Her parents were hippie artists who "dreamed of elsewhere" and wanted to protect their children from the intense pressures to succeed in Korea. They immigrated with their children to Paris. She has described her difficulty of adapting to living in a new country. Once she started primary school, she says she became "extremely stressed" and developed a "survival instinct" which never left her. After obtaining her baccalaureate, Park continued her studies at the École nationale supérieure des arts décoratifs.

== Career ==
Park first worked as a visual artist, establishing her own practice in which she creates sculptures and paintings. Before accepting the lead role in Davy Chou's Return to Seoul (2022), she had no plans to pursue acting and never took any acting classes. She was introduced to Chou through a mutual friend and their first meeting was only for Chou to gain cultural insight through Park. However, after their conversation he reached out to Park and asked her for a camera test for the main character in his film. She hesitated before accepting and worked with Chou on rewriting the script for a year, deconstructing the role so that it would represent feminist messages and feature an authentic image of Korean culture. In the film, Park stars as a Korean adoptee from France named Freddie who travels to South Korea and reunites with her biological parents.

In 2024, she appeared in the Apple TV+ fashion drama series La Maison, which traces the history of an haute couture house.

In 2025, she appeared as the romantic interest in Hafsia Herzi's lesbian drama The Little Sister, which was screened in the main competition at the 2025 Cannes Film Festival, where it won the Queer Palm. She starred in two other films which screened at that year's Cannes edition, Rebecca Zlotowski's A Private Life and Anna Cazenave Cambet's Love Me Tender.

== Filmography ==
=== Film ===
Year	Title	Role	Notes
2022	Return to Seoul	Frédérique "Freddie" Benoît	
2025	The Little Sister	Ji-Na	
2025	A Private Life	Vanessa Park	
2025	Love Me Tender	Victoria	

=== Television ===
Year	Title	Role	Notes
2024	La Maison	Ye-Ji Kiang	

== Awards and nominations ==
Accolades received by Park Ji-min
Year	Award	Category	Work	Result	Ref.
2022	Asia Pacific Screen Awards	Best New Performance	Return to Seoul	Won	
2023	Asian Film Awards	Best Newcomer	Return to Seoul	Nominated	
2024	Lumière Awards	Best Female Revelation	Return to Seoul	Nominated	
