= Lisbon & Estoril Film Festival =

Annual film festival in Portugal

- Official poster
- Location: Lisbon and Sintra, Portugal
- Predecessor: European Film Festival (2007); Estoril Film Festival (2007–2010); Lisbon & Estoril Film Festival (2010–2017)
- Founded: 2006
- Artistic director: Catarina Sampaio
- Website: leffest.com

The Lisbon & Estoril Film Festival (LEFFEST), formerly Estoril Film Festival, but also known as Lisbon & Sintra Film Festival, is an annual international film festival held in November in Estoril, Portugal. Established in 2006, the competition section is open to international films, animation, fiction and documentaries. It awards the Silver Seagull Award for Best Film, amongst others. In 2017, the festival moved to Sintra and was named Lisbon & Sintra Film Festival.

== Awards ==
- LEFFEST Best Film Award
- Jury Prize João Bénard da Costa
- Jury Special Prize - Best Director
- Jury Special Prize - Relevação

== Winners ==
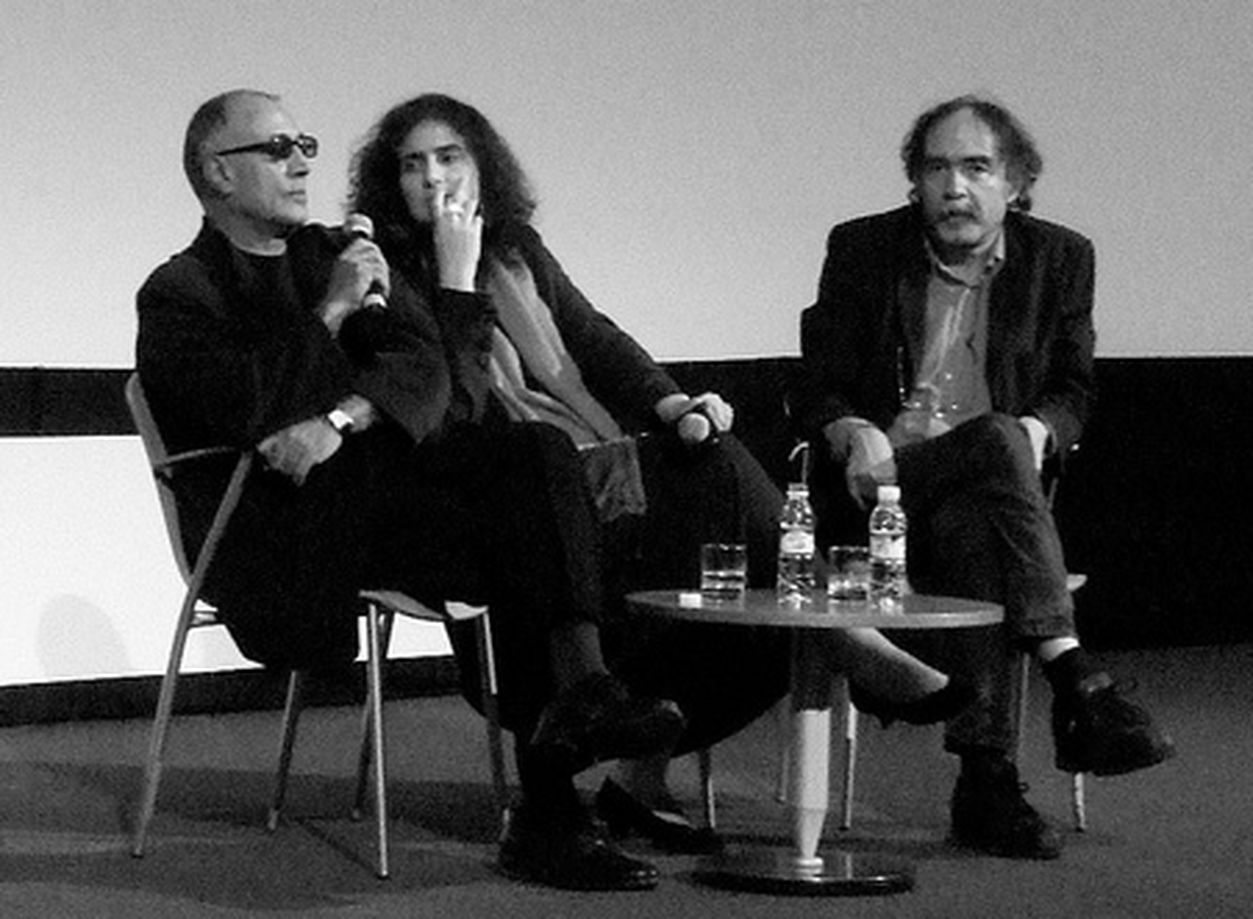
Abbas Kiarostami and Paulo Branco at the Estoril Film Festival in 2010

Ceremony	Date	Best Film Award LEFFEST	Jury Prize João Bénard da Costa	Ref.
16th LEFFEST - Lisbon & Sintra Film Festival	10–20 November 2022	Poet by Darezhan Omirbayev	Return to Dust by Li Ruijun	
17th LEFFEST - Lisbon & Sintra Film Festival	10–19 November 2023	Close Your Eyes by Víctor Erice	The Delinquents by Rodrigo Moreno	
