= List of Kazakhstani films =

A list of films produced in Kazakhstan many of which are produced in the Kazakh language.

== A ==
- Abai (1995)
- Aksuat (1999)
- Alciz Shurek (1994)
- Allazhar (1993)
- Altyn Kyrghol (2001)
- Amanat (2016)
- Amangel'dy (1938)
- Amerikanskaya doch (1995)
- Antiromantika (2001)
- Ayka (2018)

== B ==
- Batyr-bayan (1993)
- Baykalskiy intsident. Skrytaya ugroza (2014)
- Burnaja reka, bezmiateznoje more (2004)
- Bride Sabina 2 (2016)

== C ==
- Corn Island (2014)
- The Crying Steppe (2020)
- Cadet (2025)

== D ==
- Damilya (2014)
- Desant (1988)
- Dzhosus/Lazutchik (1992)
- Dzhuliya (1992)

== E ==
- Eisenstein v Alma-Ate (1998)
- Ergii (2001)
- Experimentum crucis (1995)

== F ==
- The Fall of Otrar (1991)
- Fara (1999)
- The First Rains of Spring (2011)

== G ==
- The Gentle Indifference of the World (2018)
- Golubinyj zvonar (1994)
- Gorkiy dym oseni (1997)
- Gospodi, pomiluy zabludshikh (1992)

== H ==
- Harmony Lessons (2013)
- Highway (1999)
- Hundeleben (2004)
- Hunting the Phantom (2014)

== J ==
- Jylama (2003)

== K ==
- Kairat (1992)
- Kardiogramma
- Kempyr (2014)
- Kiyan (Konechnaya ostanovka) (1989)
- Killer (1998)
- Kyz-Zhibek (1970)

== L ==
- Lift (2018)

== M ==
- Malenkie lyudi (2003)
- Molitva Leyly (2002)
- Mongol (2007)
- Myn Bala (2011)

== N ==
- Namis (1996)
- Nomad (2006)

== O ==
- Ograblenie po-kazakh$ki (2014)
- Okhotnik (2004)
- Ompa (1998)
- Ostrov vozrozhdeniya (2004)
- Ovsunchu (2003)
- The Owners (2014)
- The Old Man (2012)

== P ==
- The Plague at the Karatas Village (2016)
- Poka - Heisst Tschüss auf Russisch (2014)
- Posledniye kanikuly (1996)
- Posledniye kholoda (1993)
- Prisoner of the Mountains (1996)

== R ==
- Returning to the 'A' (2011)
- The Road (2001)

== S ==
- Sagan kushik kerek pe? (2004)
- Schastye (1996)
- Shiza (2004)
- Smacznego, telewizorku (1993)
- Songs from the Southern Seas (2008)
- Sorcerer's Dolls (1998)
- Steppe Express (2005)
- Stranger (1993)
- Stranger (2015)
- Sunny Days (2011)

== T ==
- Taraz (2016)
- Tot, kto nezhneye (1995)
- Tri brata (2000)
- Tropinka k oblakam (2014)
- Tomiris (2019)
- Tulpan (2008)
- Tyghyryqtan zhol tapqan (2014)

== U ==
- Ulzhan (2007)

== V ==
- La voix des steppes (2014)
- Vokaldy paralelder (2005)

== W ==
- Walnut Tree (2015)
- The Wild East (1993)
- The Wounded Angel (2016)

== Y ==
- Ya ne vernus (2014)
- Yellow Cat (2020)

== Z ==
- Zagovor Oberona (2014)
- Zhizneopisaniye molodogo akkordeonista (1994)
- Zhol (2014)
- Zhyoshya (2006)
