= Asian Film Award for Best Director =

Asian Film Awards

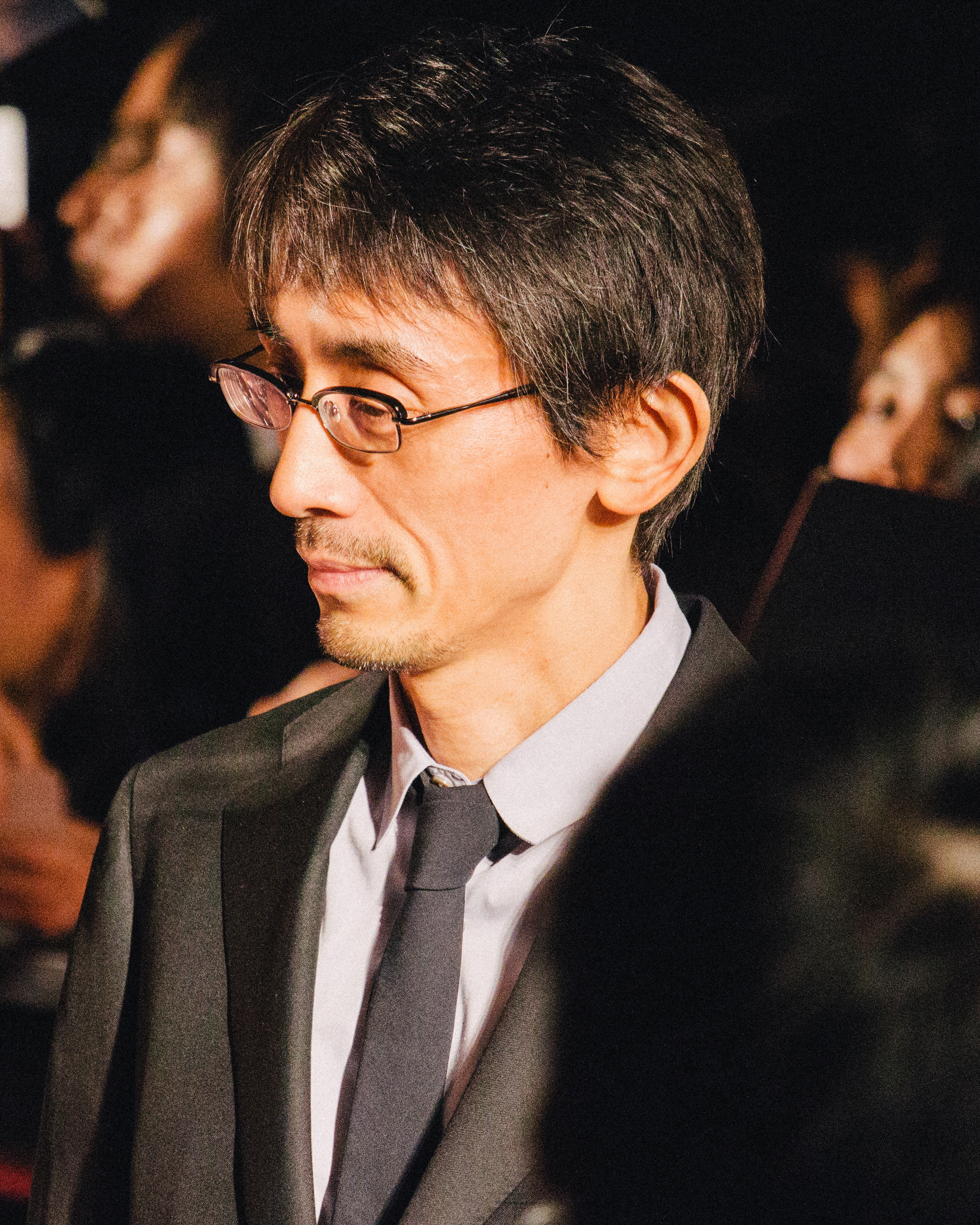
- The 2025 recipient: Daihachi Yoshida
- Awarded for: Excellence in Directing in Asian Cinema
- Presented by: Asian Film Awards Academy
- First award: 2007
- Most recent winner: Daihachi Yoshida; Teki Cometh (2025)
- Website: afa-academy.com

The Asian Film Award for Best Director is presented annually by the Asian Film Awards Academy (AFAA), a non-profit organization founded by Busan International Film Festival, Hong Kong International Film Festival and Tokyo International Film Festival with the shared goal of celebrating excellence in Asian cinema.

== History ==
It was first presented in 2007 during the first edition of the awards. Chinese filmmaker Jia Zhangke was the first recipient of the award for his work in the drama Still Life. The most recent winner is Japanese director Daihachi Yoshida for the film Teki Cometh.

Japanese film director Hirokazu Kore-eda and South Korean director Lee Chang-dong both hold the record of most wins in the category with three; Kore-eda for Still Walking (2009), Broker (2023) and Monster (2024); Lee for Secret Sunshine (2008), Poetry (2011) and Burning (2019). They are also the only directors with multiple wins in the category. Hirokazu Koreeda is also the director with the most nominations for the award with six.

== Winners and nominees ==
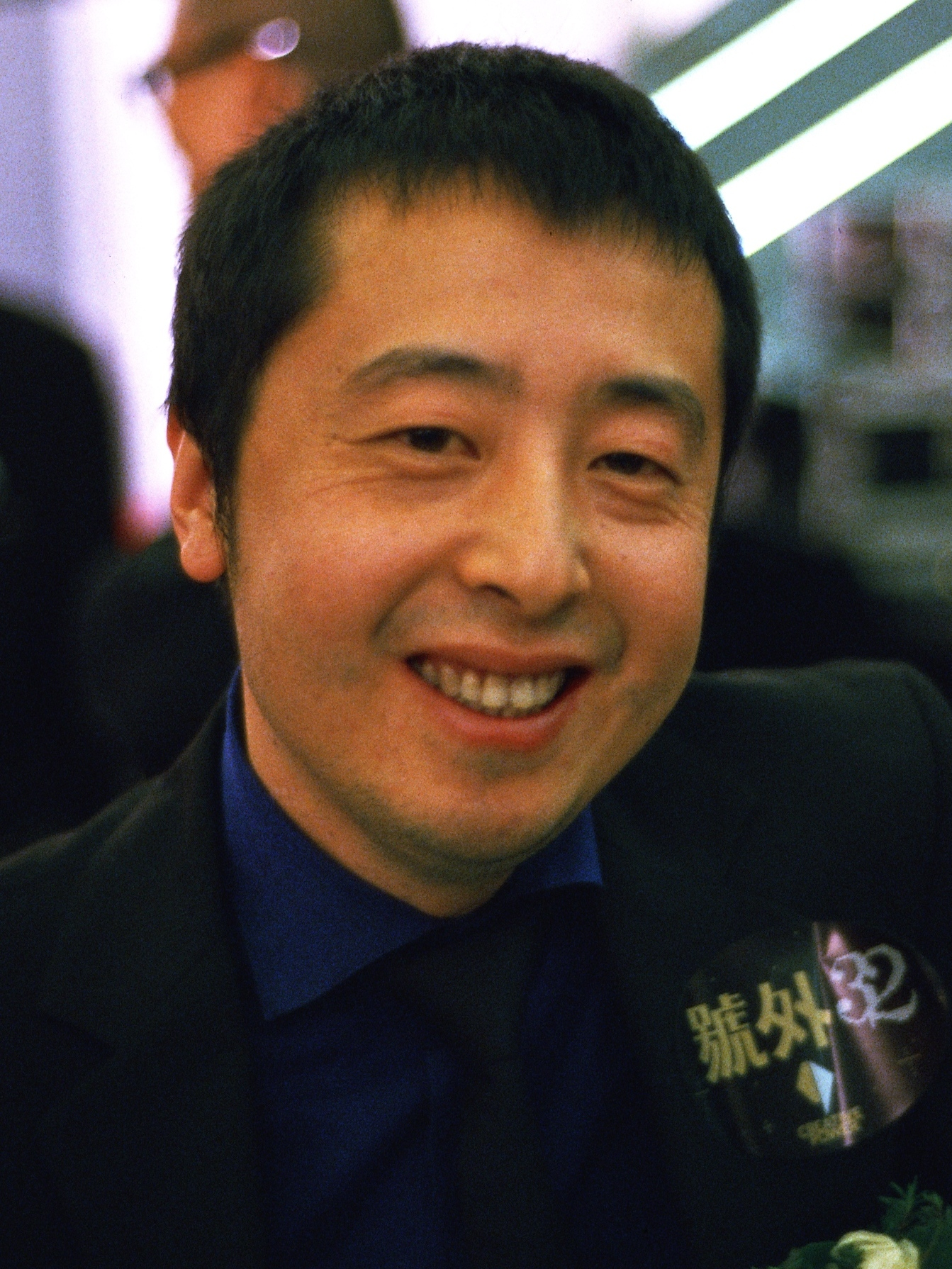
Jia Zhangke, the inaugural winner of the award

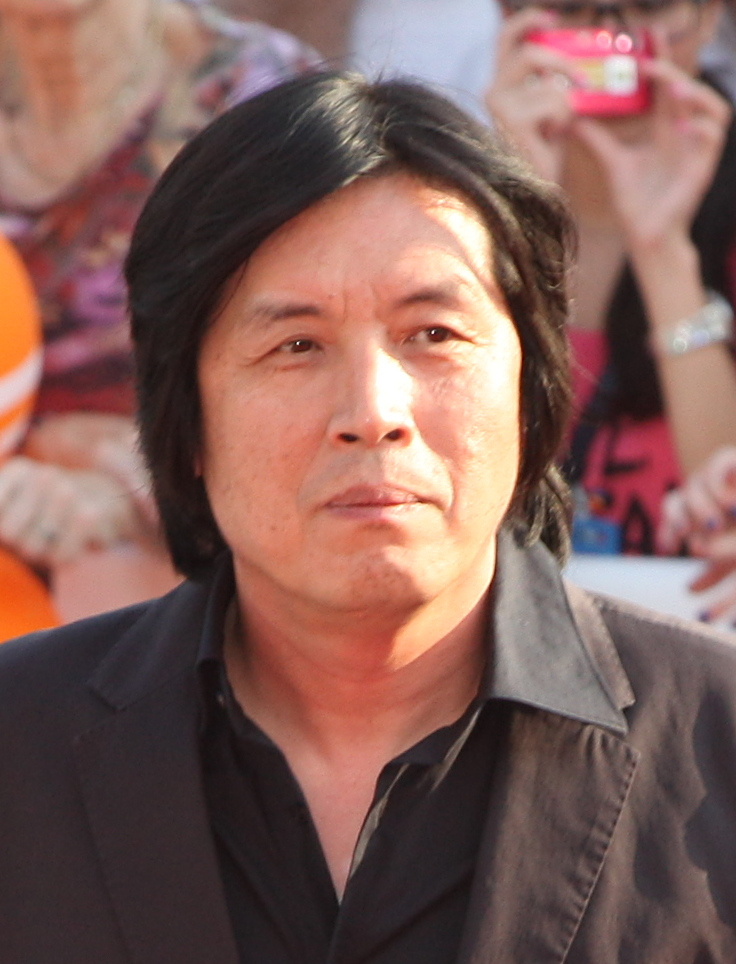
Three-time winner Lee Chang-dong

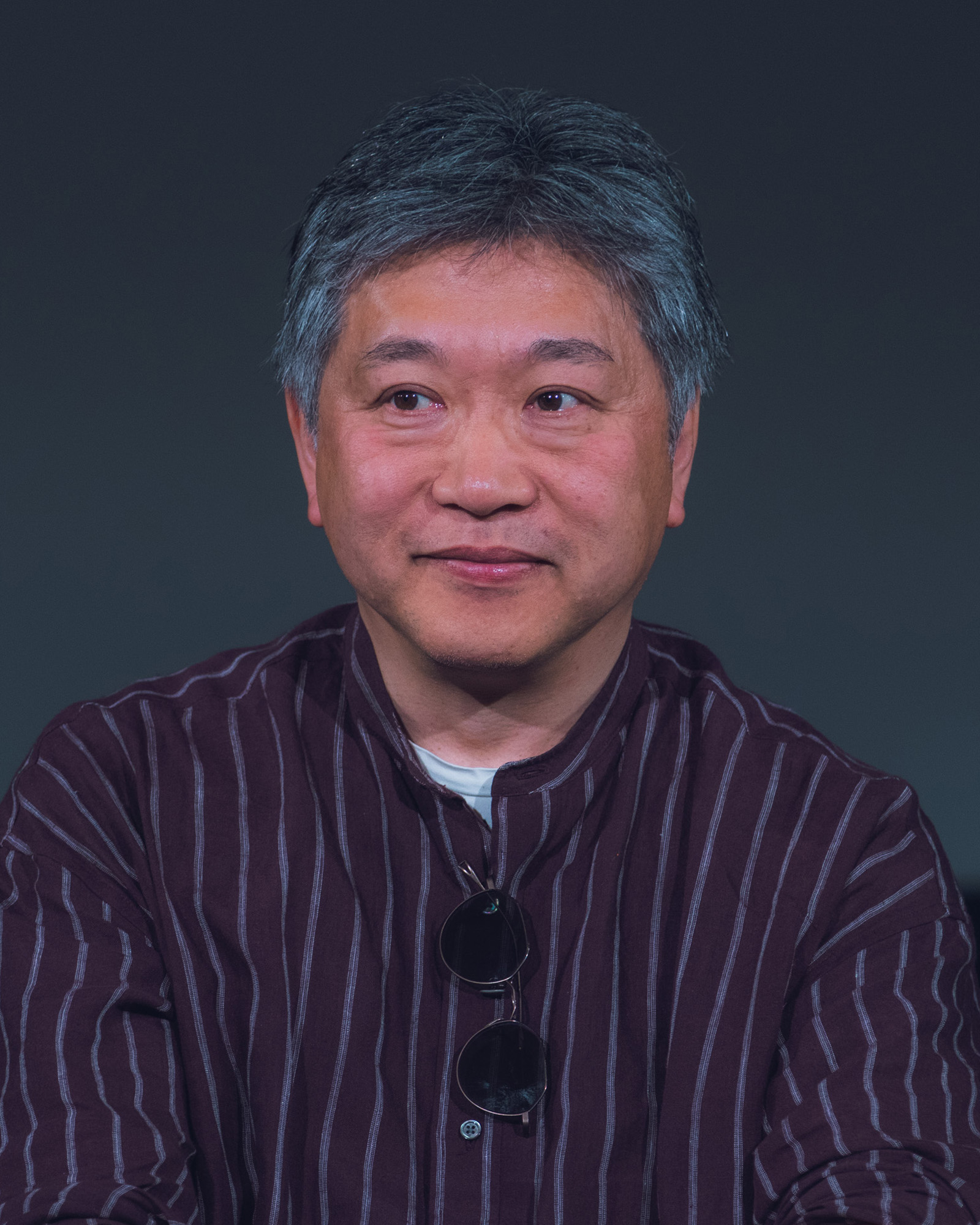
Three-time winner Hirokazu Kore-eda

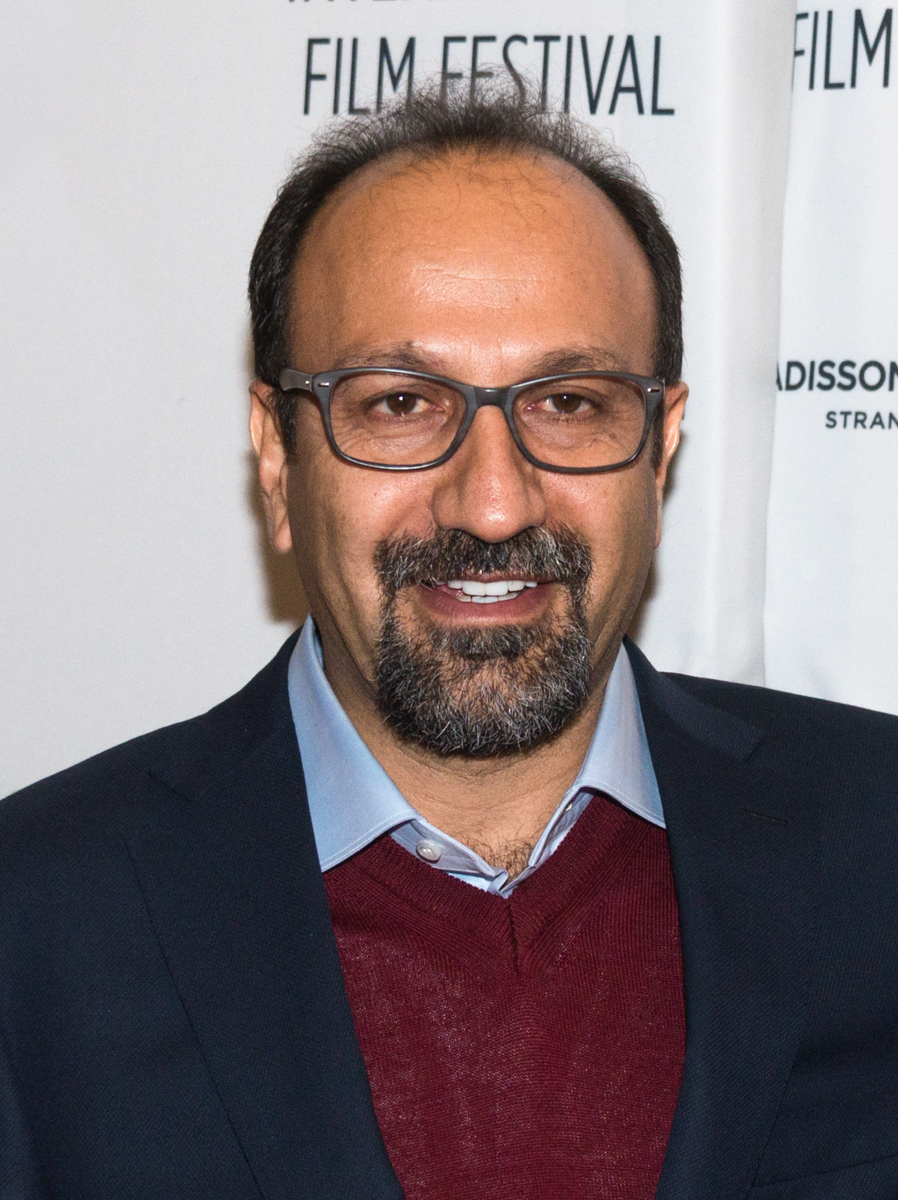
2012 winner Asghar Farhadi

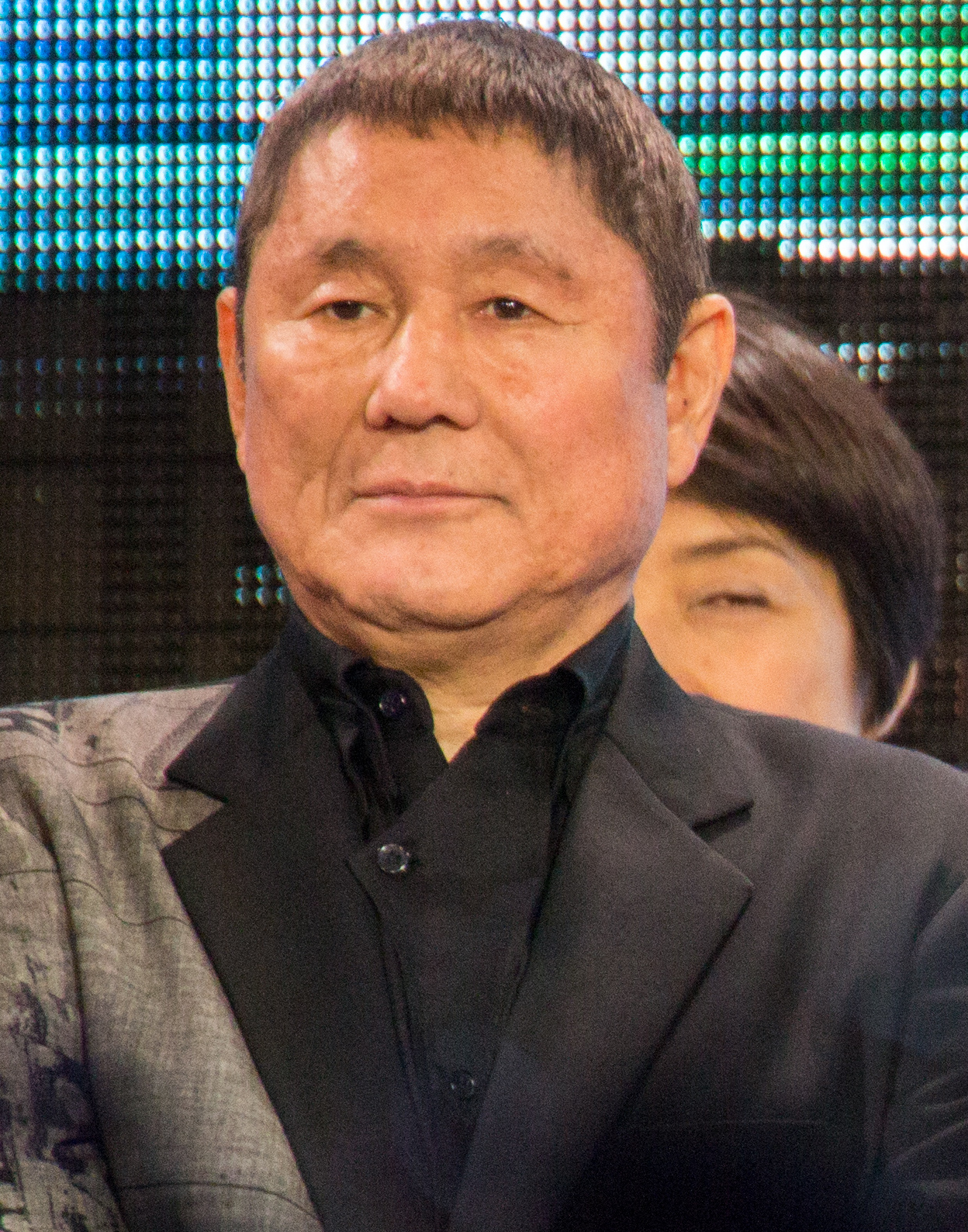
2013 winner Takeshi Kitano

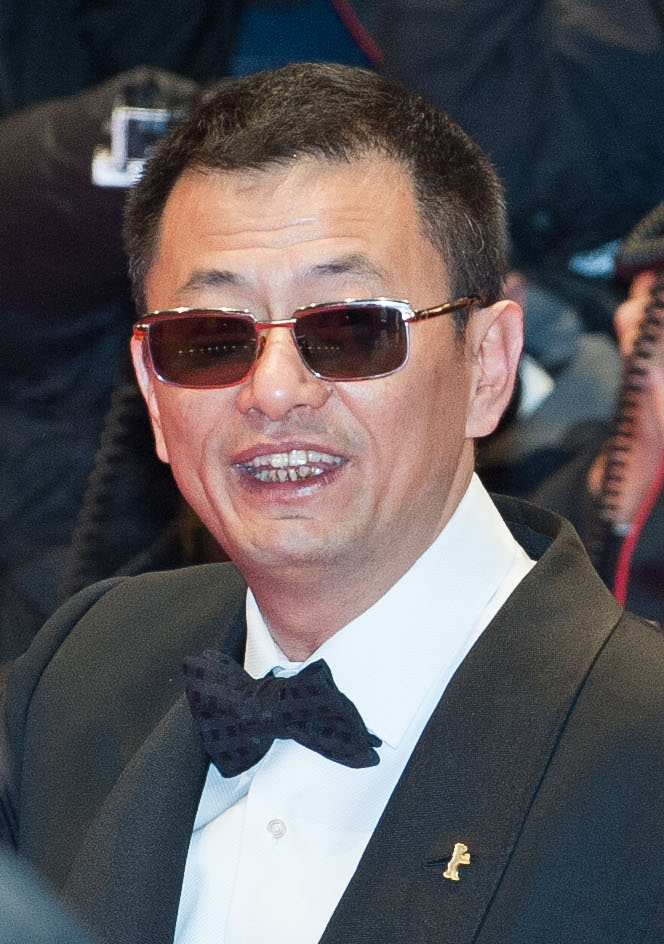
2014 winner Wong Kar-wai

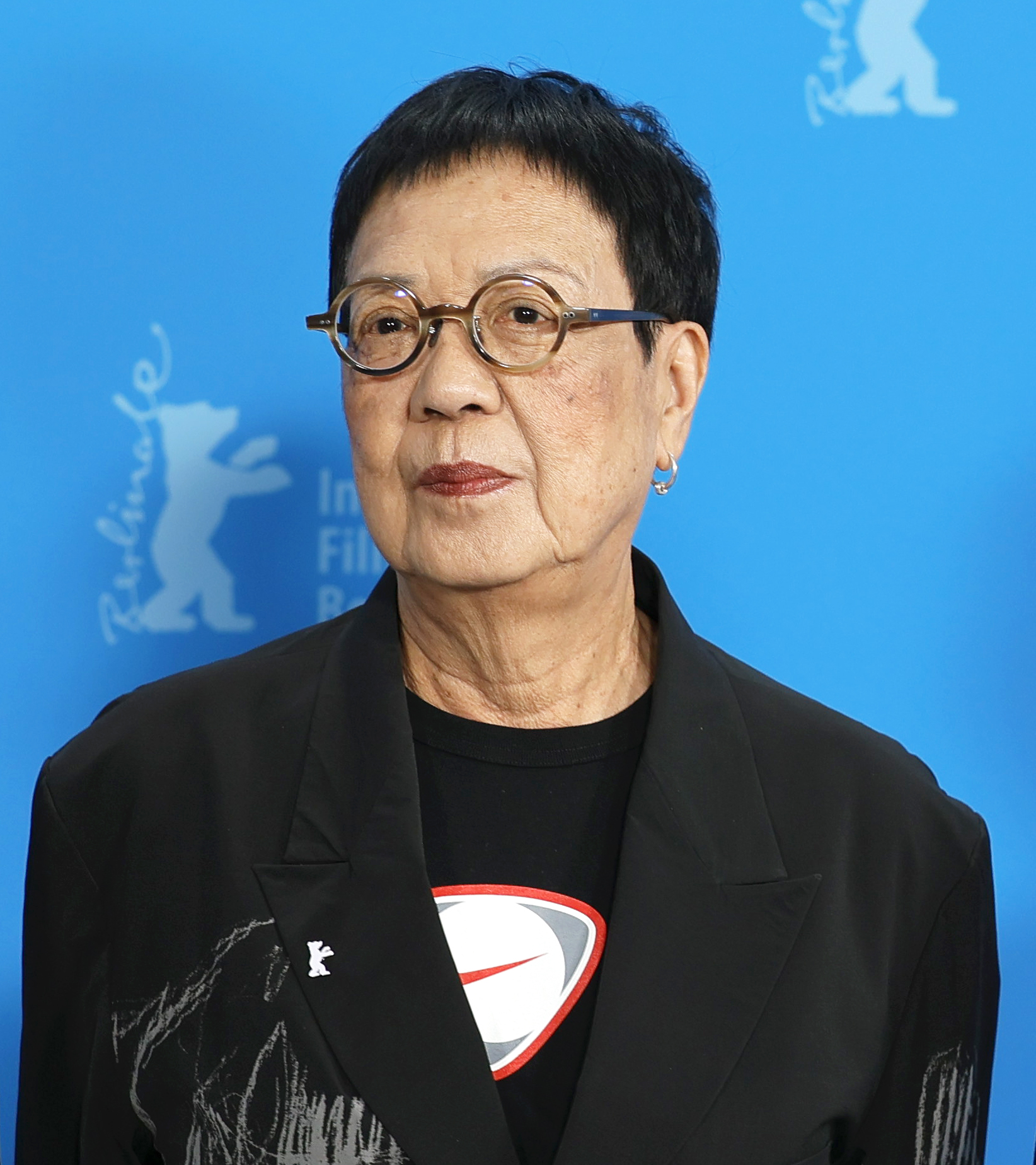
2015 winner Ann Hui

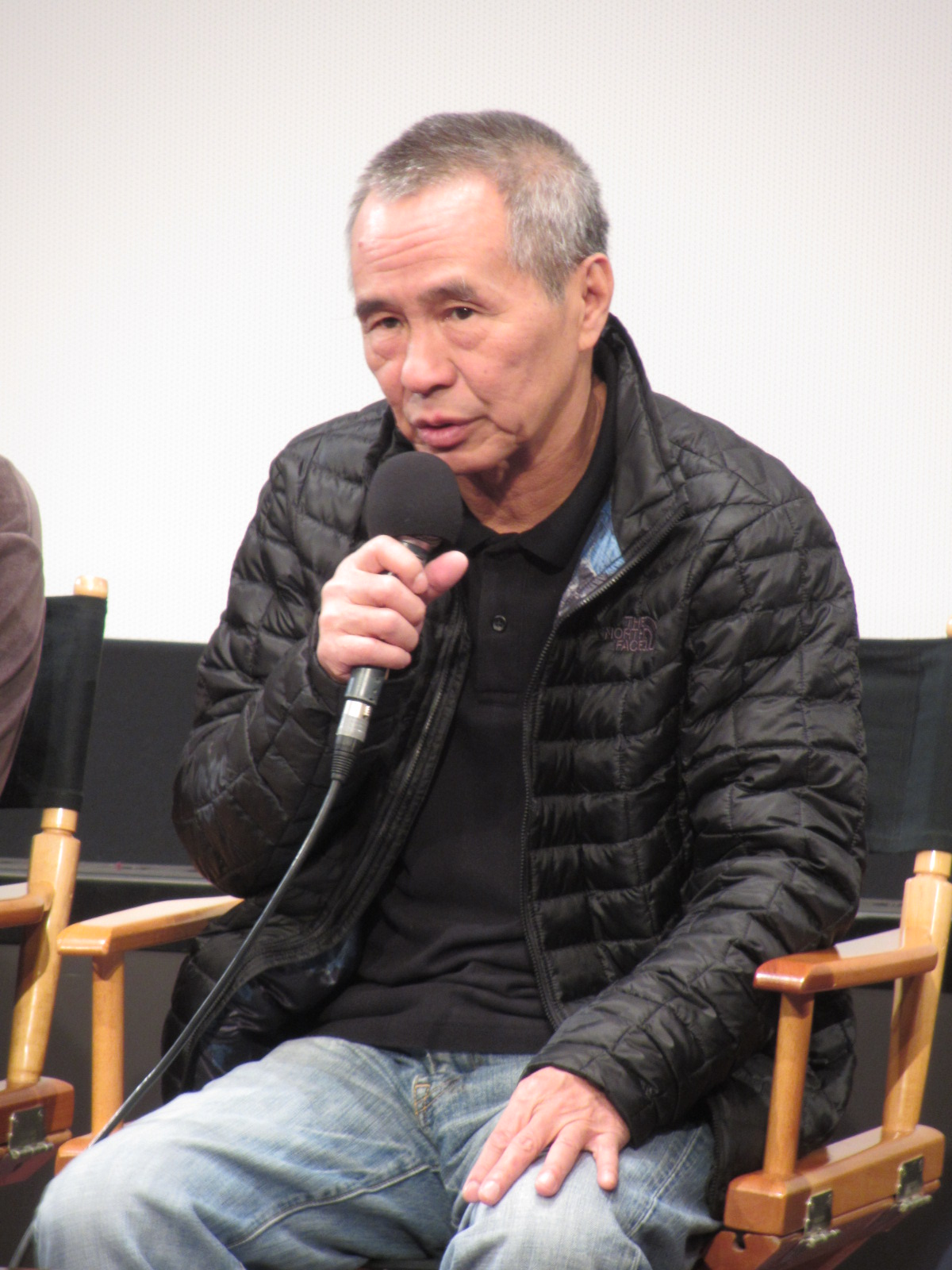
2016 winner Hou Hsiao-hsien

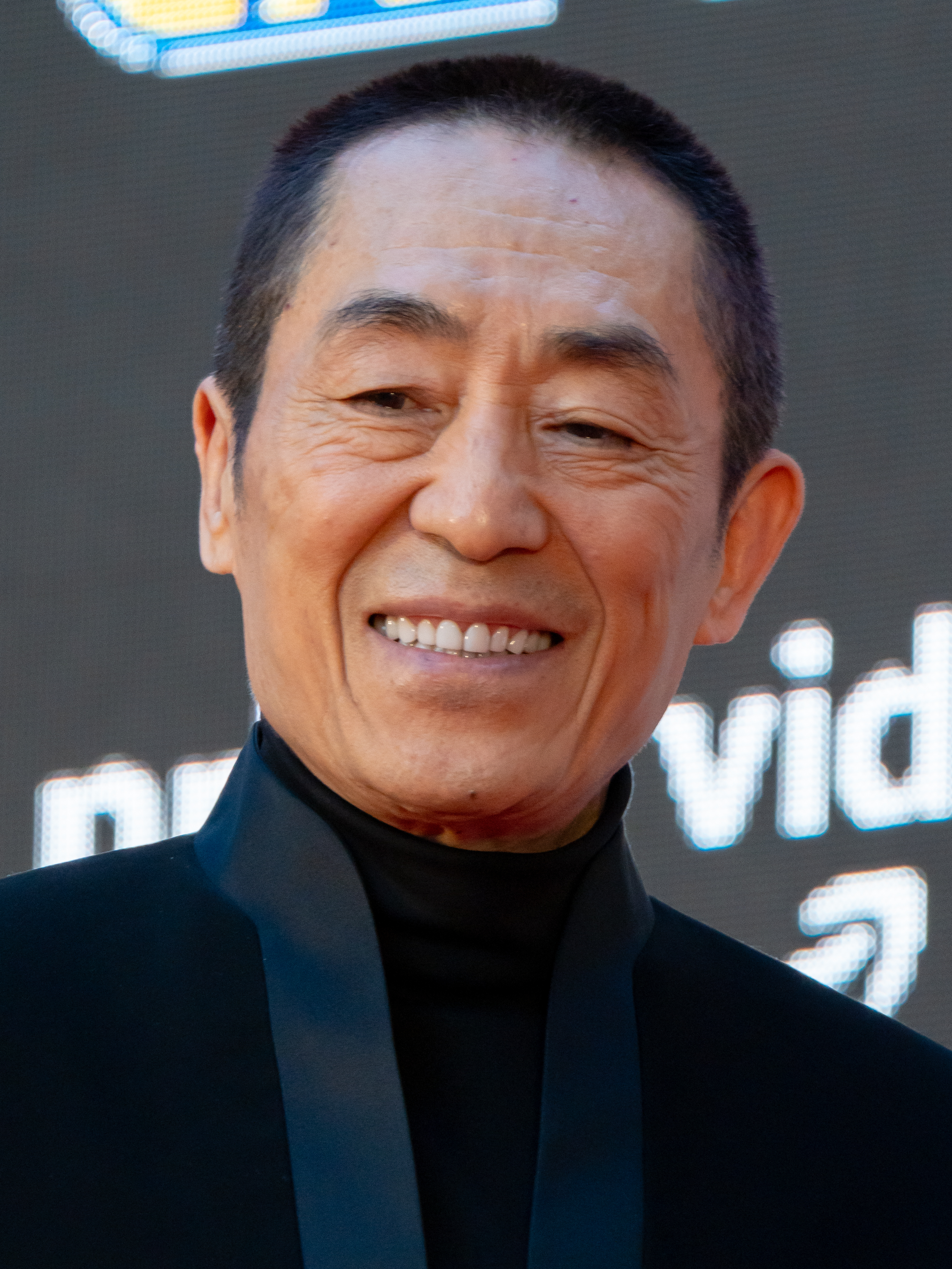
2021 winner Zhang Yimou

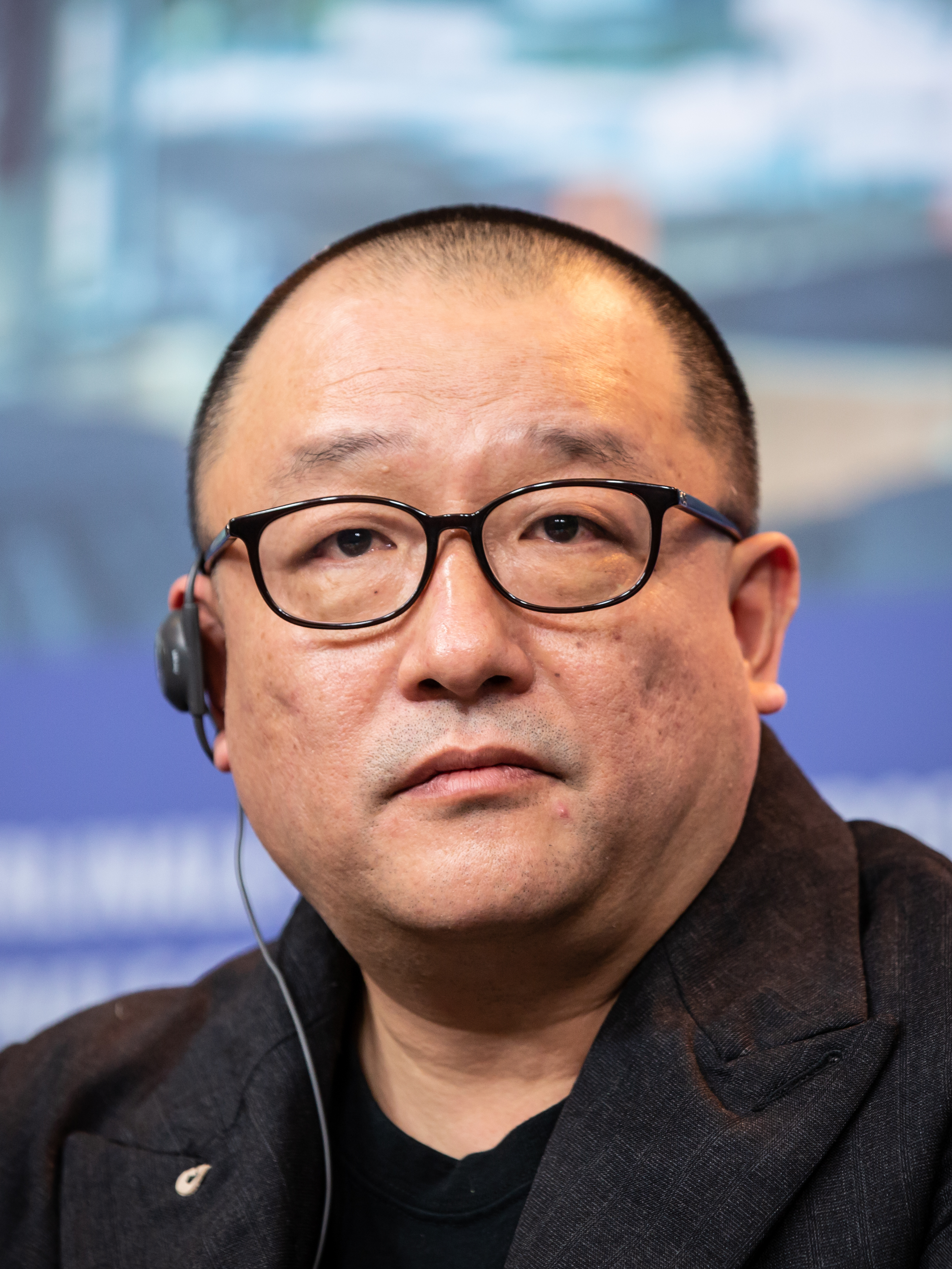
2020 winner Wang Xiaoshuai

=== 2000s ===
Year	Recipient(s)	English title	Original title	Ref.
2007	(China) Jia Zhangke	Still Life	三峡好人	
2007	(South Korea) Hong Sang-soo	Woman on the Beach	해변의 여인	
2007	(Iran) Jafar Panahi	Offside	آفساید	
2007	(Hong Kong) Johnnie To	Exiled	放逐	
2007	(Taiwan) Tsai Ming-liang	I Don't Want to Sleep Alone	黑眼圈	
2007	(Thailand) Apichatpong Weerasethakul	Syndromes and a Century	อภิชาติพงศ์ วีระเศรษฐกุล	
2008	(South Korea) Lee Chang-dong	Secret Sunshine	밀양	
2008	(Hong Kong) Peter Chan	The Warlords	投名状	
2008	(China) Jiang Wen	The Sun Also Rises	太阳照常升起	
2008	(Taiwan) Ang Lee	Lust, Caution	投名状	
2008	(Japan) Masayuki Suo	I Just Didn't Do It	それでもボクはやってない	
2008	(South Korea) Zhang Lu	Desert Dream	경계	
2009	(Japan) Hirokazu Kore-eda	Still Walking	歩いても 歩いても	
2009	(China) Feng Xiaogang	If You Are the One	非诚勿扰	
2009	(South Korea) Kim Jee-woon	The Good, the Bad, the Weird	좋은 놈, 나쁜 놈, 이상한 놈	
2009	(Philippines) Brillante Mendoza	Service	Serbis	
2009	(Japan) Hayao Miyazaki	Ponyo on the Cliff by the Sea	崖の上のポニョ	
2009	(Hong Kong) John Woo	Red Cliff	赤壁	

=== 2010s ===
Year	Recipient(s)	English title	Original title	Ref.
2010	(China) Lu Chuan	City of Life and Death	南京! 南京!	
2010	(South Korea) Bong Joon-ho	Mother	마더	
2010	(Iran) Asghar Farhadi	About Elly	درباره الی, Darbareye Elly	
2010	(Philippines) Brillante Mendoza	Grandmother	Lola	
2010	(Japan) Sion Sono	Love Exposure	愛のむきだし	
2010	(Hong Kong) Yonfan	Prince of Tears	淚王子	
2011	(South Korea) Lee Chang-dong	Poetry	시	
2011	(China) Feng Xiaogang	Aftershock	唐山大地震	
2011	(China) Jiang Wen	Let the Bullets Fly	让子弹飞	
2011	(Japan) Takashi Miike	13 Assassins	十三人の刺客	
2011	(South Korea) Na Hong-jin	The Yellow Sea	황해	
2011	(Japan) Tetsuya Nakashima	Confessions	告白	
2012	(Iran) Asghar Farhadi	A Separation	جدایی نادر از سیمین, Jodái-e Náder az Simin	
2012	(Indonesia) Teddy Soeriaatmadja	Lovely Man		
2012	(Japan) Sion Sono	Guilty of Romance	恋の罪	
2012	(Hong Kong) Tsui Hark	Flying Swords of Dragon Gate	龍門飛甲	
2012	(Taiwan) Wei Te-sheng	Seediq Bale	賽德克·巴萊	
2012	(China) Zhang Yimou	The Flowers of War	金陵十三钗	
2013	(Japan) Takeshi Kitano	Outrage Beyond	アウトレイジ ビヨンド	
2013	(India) Anurag Kashyap	Gangs of Wasseypur – Part 1 & 2		
2013	(Iran) Abbas Kiarostami	Like Someone in Love	ライク・サムワン・イン・ラブ	
2013	(South Korea) Kim Ki-duk	Pietà	피에타	
2013	(China) Lou Ye	Mystery	浮城谜事	
2014	(Hong Kong) Wong Kar-wai	The Grandmaster	一代宗師	
2014	(South Korea) Bong Joon-ho	Snowpiercer	설국열차	
2014	(Singapore) Anthony Chen	Ilo Ilo	爸妈不在家	
2014	(Japan) Hirokazu Kore-eda	Like Father, Like Son	そして父になる, Soshite Chichi ni Naru	
2014	(Taiwan) Tsai Ming-liang	Stray Dogs	Jiao You	
2015	(Hong Kong) Ann Hui	The Golden Era	黃金時代	
2015	(India) Vishal Bhardwaj	Haider		
2015	(Philippines) Lav Diaz	From What Is Before	Mula sa Kung Ano ang Noon	
2015	(South Korea) Hong Sang-soo	Hill of Freedom	자유의 언덕	
2015	(China) Lou Ye	Blind Massage	推拿	
2015	(Japan) Shinya Tsukamoto	Fires on the Plain	Nobi	
2016	(Taiwan) Hou Hsiao-hsien	The Assassin	刺客聶隱娘	
2016	(China) Guan Hu	Mr. Six	老炮兒	
2016	(China) Jia Zhangke	Mountains May Depart	山河故人	
2016	(Japan) Hirokazu Kore-eda	Our Little Sister	海街diary	
2016	(South Korea) Ryoo Seung-wan	Veteran	베테랑	
2017	(South Korea) Na Hong-jin	The Wailing	곡성	
2017	(Philippines) Lav Diaz	The Woman Who Left	Ang Babaeng Humayo	
2017	(China) Feng Xiaogang	I Am Not Madame Bovary	我不是潘金莲	
2017	(Japan) Kōji Fukada	Harmonium	淵に立つ	
2017	(Hong Kong) Derek Tsang	Soul Mate	七月與安生	
2018	(Japan) Yuya Ishii	The Tokyo Night Sky Is Always the Densest Shade of Blue	映画 夜空はいつでも最高密度の青色だ	
2018	(Taiwan) Sylvia Chang	Love Education	相愛相親	
2018	(China) Chen Kaige	Legend of the Demon Cat	妖猫传	
2018	(China) Feng Xiaogang	Youth	芳华	
2018	(South Korea) Hong Sang-soo	The Day After	그 후	
2018	(Hong Kong) Ann Hui	Our Time Will Come	明月幾時有	
2019	(South Korea) Lee Chang-dong	Burning	버닝	
2019	(China) Pema Tseden	Jinpa	撞死了一只羊	
2019	(India) Rajkumar Hirani	Sanju		
2019	(Japan) Hirokazu Kore-eda	Shoplifters	万引き家族	
2019	(Hong Kong) Fruit Chan	Three Husbands	三夫	

=== 2020s ===
Year	Recipient(s)	English title	Original title	Ref.
2020	(China) Wang Xiaoshuai	So Long, My Son	地久天长	
2020	(China) Pema Tseden	Balloon	དབུགས་ལྒང་། (Tibetan); 气球 (Simplified Chinese)	
2020	(Taiwan) Tsai Ming-liang	Days	日子	
2020	(South Korea) Bong Joon-ho	Parasite	기생충	
2020	(Taiwan) Chung Mong-hong	A Sun	陽光普照	
2020	(Japan) Nobuhiro Suwa	Voices in the Wind	風の電話	
2021	(China) Zhang Yimou	One Second	一秒钟	
2021	(Kazakhstan) Adhilkan Yerzhanov	Yellow Cat		
2021	(Japan) Kiyoshi Kurosawa	Wife of a Spy	スパイの妻	
2021	(Japan) Ryusuke Hamaguchi	Wheel of Fortune and Fantasy	偶然と想像	
2021	(South Korea) Lee Joon-ik	The Book of Fish	자산어보	
2023	(South Korea) Hirokazu Kore-eda	Broker	브로커	
2023	(South Korea) Park Chan-wook	Decision to Leave	헤어질 결심	
2023	(Japan) Ryusuke Hamaguchi	Drive My Car	ドライブ・マイ・カー	
2023	(Cambodia) Davy Chou	Return to Seoul	Retour à Séoul	
2023	(Kazakhstan) Darezhan Omirbaev	Poet	Akyn	
2024	(Japan) Hirokazu Kore-eda	Monster	怪物	
2024	(China) Gu Xiaogang	Dwelling by the West Lake	草木人間	
2024	(Japan) Ryusuke Hamaguchi	Evil Does Not Exist	悪は存在しない	
2024	(South Korea) Kim Sung-su	12.12: The Day	서울의 봄	
2024	(Sri Lanka) Prasanna Vithanage	Paradise		
2025	(Japan) Daihachi Yoshida	Teki Cometh	敵	
2025	(India) Payal Kapadia	All We Imagine as Light		
2025	(South Korea) Jang Jae-hyun	Exhuma	파묘	
2025	(China) Guan Hu	Black Dog	狗阵	
2025	(Cambodia) Rithy Panh	Meeting with Pol Pot	Rendez-vous avec Pol Pot	

== See also ==
- Blue Dragon Film Award for Best Director
- Cannes Film Festival Award for Best Director
- European Film Award for Best Director
- Golden Horse Award for Best Director
- Hong Kong Film Award for Best Director
- Silver Lion
