= Yellow cat =

Yellow cat or Yellow Cat may refer to:

- Flathead catfish, a species of catfish also known as yellow cat
- Yellow Cat (film), a 2020 Kazakhstani comedy-drama film
- "Yellow Cat" (song), a song by John Denver
