= The Poet =

The Poet may refer to:

- The Poet (album), a 1981 album by Bobby Womack
- "The Poet" (essay), an 1844 essay by Ralph Waldo Emerson
- The Poet (1956 film), a Soviet drama film
- The Poet (2007 film), a Canadian drama film
- The Poet (2025 film), a Russian musical period drama film
- The Poet (novel), a 1996 novel by Michael Connelly
- The Poet, a 1911 painting by Pablo Picasso
- Half-Past Three, or The Poet, a 1911 painting by Marc Chagall
- Le Poète, or The Poet, a 1966 lithograph by Marc Chagall
- The Poets, a band from Glasgow
- Peter Costa (poker player), a professional poker player whose nickname is "The Poet"
- Ash-Shu'ara, the twenty-sixth sura of the Qur'an, usually translated as "The Poets"

== See also ==
- The Poetess (disambiguation)
- Poet (disambiguation)
