= Cardiogram =

- Directed by: Darezhan Omirbaev
- Written by: Darezhan Omirbaev
- Starring: Zhasulan Asauov
- Cinematography: Boris Trochev
- Release date: 1995
- Languages: Kazakh, Russian

Cardiogram (Kazakh: Кардиограмма, "Kardıogramma") is a 1995 Kazakh drama film written and directed by Darezhan Omirbaev.

The film was entered into the main competition at the 52nd edition of the Venice Film Festival, winning the CICT/UNESCO "Enrico Fulchignoni Award". It was also awarded Silver Screen Award for Best Asian Feature Film at the 1997 Singapore International Film Festival.

== Cast ==
- Zhasulan Asauov as Zhasulan
- Gulnara Dusmatova as Enfermera Gula
- Ilyas Kalymbetov as Ilyas
- Saule Toktybayeva as Saule
