= Diamond Island (film) =

2016 film by Davy Chou

- Film poster
- Directed by: Davy Chou
- Written by: Davy Chou; Claire Maugendre
- Produced by: Charlotte Vincent
- Starring: Sobon Nuon
- Cinematography: Thomas Favel
- Edited by: Laurent Leveneur
- Music by: Jérémie Arcache; Christophe Musset
- Production companies: Aurora Films; Vycky Films; Arte France Cinéma; Vanderstatic; Anti-Archive; 185 Films
- Distributed by: Les Films du Losange (France)
- Release date: 13 May 2016 (Cannes)
- Running time: 101 minutes
- Countries: Cambodia; France; Germany; Thailand; Qatar
- Language: Khmer

Diamond Island is a 2016 drama film directed and co-written by Davy Chou. The film is a co-production between Cambodia, France, Germany, Thailand and Qatar. The film features a cast of first-time actors. Casting took place over five months in the streets of Phnom Penh and on Facebook. The film was screened in the Critics' Week section at the 2016 Cannes Film Festival where it won the SACD Award.

== Cast ==
- Sobon Nuon as Bora
- Cheanick Nov as Solei
- Madeza Chhem as Asa
- Mean Korn as Di
- Samnang Nut as Virak
- Sophyna Meng as Mesa
- Sreyleap Hang as Pinky
- Jany Min as Lida
- Samnang Khim as Leakhena
- Batham Oun as Blue

== Plot ==
The film follows 18-year-old Bora, who leaves his rural village to work on the construction sites of Diamond Island, a luxury development in Phnom Penh. There, he befriends fellow workers and reconnects with his older brother, Solei, who had been missing for five years. Solei introduces him to a world of urban youth, filled with excitement, nightlife, and illusions.
