= The Poetess (disambiguation) =

The Poetess is an American rapper.

The Poetess may also refer to:

- Sappho (c. 630 – c. 570 BC), an ancient Greek poet
- The Poetess, a character in the UK game show, The Desert Forges
- The Poetess, a 1940 painting by Joan Miró

== See also ==
- The Poet (disambiguation)
- Poet (disambiguation)
- List of women poets
