= Return to Seoul =

2022 film by Davy Chou

- French theatrical release poster
- French: Retour à Séoul
- Directed by: Davy Chou
- Written by: Davy Chou
- Produced by: Charlotte Vincent; Katia Khazak
- Starring: Park Ji-min; Oh Kwang-rok; Guka Han; Kim Sun-young; Yoann Zimmer; Hur Ouk-Sook; Louis-Do de Lencquesaing
- Cinematography: Thomas Favel
- Edited by: Dounia Sichov
- Music by: Jérémie Arcache; Christophe Musset
- Production companies: Aurora Films; Vandertastic Films; Frakas Productions; VOO; BeTV
- Distributed by: Les Films du Losange (France); Rapid Eye Movies (Germany); Imagine Film Distribution (Belgium); Sony Pictures Classics (North and Latin America, Middle East, Australia and New Zealand); Westec Media Limited (Cambodia)
- Release dates: 22 May 2022 (Cannes); 18 November 2022 (Cambodia); 25 January 2023 (France); 26 January 2023 (Germany); 8 February 2023 (Belgium)
- Running time: 119 minutes
- Countries: France; Germany; Belgium; Qatar; Cambodia
- Languages: French; Korean; English
- Box office: $2.2 million

Return to Seoul (French: Retour à Séoul; original English title: All the People I'll Never Be) is a 2022 drama film written and directed by Davy Chou, starring Park Ji-min as a 25-year-old French adoptee who travels to South Korea seeking her biological parents.

Return to Seoul premiered in the Un Certain Regard section of the Cannes Film Festival on 22 May 2022. The film was selected as the Cambodian entry for the Best International Feature Film at the 95th Academy Awards, and made the December shortlist. It received critical acclaim.

== Plot ==
Freddie, an affable 25-year-old woman, was born in South Korea and adopted by French parents. She arrives in Seoul for a two-week vacation after her flight to Tokyo is cancelled. She quickly bonds with Tena, the desk clerk at her hotel, and sleeps with a man she meets in a restaurant. Tena and a friend of hers tell Freddie about the Hammond Adoption Center. Freddie expresses no interest in finding her biological parents, yet visits the agency later.

The agency is restricted by law from revealing details of her parents, but are allowed to send them up to three telegrams per year notifying interest from adoptees. She travels to Gunsan for a brief, uncomfortable reunion with her father, with Tena serving as translator. On learning that her mother has not responded to all three telegrams, Freddie returns to her biological father's family for a three-night stay. Her father repeatedly makes drunken calls to her and sends her text messages in Korean regretting giving her up and promising a new life in South Korea.

Back in Seoul, Freddie tells Tena in a bar that she finds her father's relentless attention oppressive and asks her to tell him to stop. She then cruelly mocks declarations of love from the man she slept with on her first night in Seoul. As they are leaving, she tries to kiss Tena, who rejects her and tells Freddie she is "a very sad person". Freddie returns to her hotel with the DJ from the bar, but is confronted by her drunken father, who scolds her for ignoring his attempts at contact and scares off the DJ. Tena then suddenly appears, but her father ignores Tena's attempt to speak to him and as her father grabs hold of her arm, Freddie screams at him not to touch her and leaves.

Two years later, Freddie is living in Seoul. She goes on a date with André, a weapons dealer, who tells Freddie that she would be good in his industry. Freddie tells him that it is her birthday, and that every year on her birthday, she wonders if her mother is thinking about her. At a surprise birthday party thrown for her, she reveals to a co-worker who is also an adoptee that her mother has finally responded to several follow-up telegrams to say she is not interested in meeting her. It is revealed that Freddie's father still emails her, but she largely ignores him. Freddie tells her co-worker to contact Hammond, but her co-worker says she is following advice to learn about the Korean culture and language beforehand.

Five years later, Freddie speaks broken Korean and works with André selling missiles. On a business trip to South Korea, she goes with her French boyfriend, Maxime, to meet with her father. Her father plays her a piano tune that he wrote and performed, and Freddie is surprised at how it moves her. She becomes annoyed at Maxime when he says to her father that it is Freddie's destiny to help defend South Korea from North Korea. After dinner, she breaks up with him, heads to the entertainment district, and wakes up the next morning alone in an alley.

Freddie learns that her biological mother has responded positively to another telegram from Hammond, sent by a sympathetic employee in violation of policy. Freddie and her mother meet at a Hammond facility and Freddie weeps as her mother embraces her. Her mother gives Freddie her email address so they can stay in contact.

A year later, on her birthday, Freddie arrives at a hotel seeking a room. She writes an email to her mother apologizing for not contacting her earlier, and says that she thinks she is happy. The email fails to deliver as her mother's email address is no longer valid. Freddie goes to the hotel lobby and notices a piano with sheet music. She sits down and attempts to sight read the music, hesitantly at first, but soon producing a beautiful melody.

== Cast ==
- Park Ji-min as Frédérique "Freddie" Benoît, a French adoptee of South Korean descent searching for her biological family
- Oh Kwang-rok as Freddie's biological father
- Guka Han as Tena, a hotel worker who helps Freddie on her journey
- Kim Sun-young as Freddie's biological aunt
- Yoann Zimmer as Maxime
- Louis-Do de Lencquesaing as André
- Hur Ouk-Sook as Freddie's biological grandmother
- Émeline Briffaud as Lucie
- Régine Vial Goldberg as Freddie's adoptive mother
- Cho-woo Choi as Freddie's biological mother

== Production ==
Director Davy Chou got the idea for the film from a similar experience with his friend, also a Korean French woman, Laure Badufle, who was adopted from South Korean biological parents. In her twenties, she traveled with him to South Korea during the filming of his 2011 documentary Golden Slumbers to meet her biological father and grandmother for the first time. Seeing how emotional their meeting was, he decided to make a film along similar lines. Not knowledgeable in Korean culture or the experience of adoption at first, he researched these elements by talking to his friend and other adoptees as well as reading books, identifying some similarities with his own life as the son of immigrants from Cambodia who had left the country before the Khmer Rouge took over. Chou met Park Ji-min through a "personal introduction" and decided to cast her as Freddie, her first film role, as he saw her as someone who "shared the essence of Freddie's free-spiritedness". He further developed her characterization through conversations with Park, which "challenged some of his notions as a male director and helped him understand how a young French woman might respond to aspects of Korea's highly patriarchal society."

The film is an international co-production between France, Germany, Belgium, Qatar and Cambodia. Filming took place over six weeks in late 2021 in South Korea and Romania.

== Release ==
The film had its world premiere in the Un Certain Regard section of the Cannes Film Festival on 22 May 2022 under the English title All the People I'll Never Be. Shortly before its Cannes premiere, Mubi and Sony Pictures Classics acquired the distribution rights to the film in different regions, with Sony Pictures Classics changing the film's English title to Return to Seoul. Return to Seoul was released theatrically in Cambodia on 18 November 2022 by Westec Media Limited, in France on 25 January 2023 by Les Films du Losange, in Germany on 26 January 2023 by Rapid Eye Movies, and in Belgium on 8 February 2023 by Imagine Film Distribution. In the United States, it was released for a one-week awards-qualifying run beginning 2 December 2022 in New York City and Los Angeles, followed by a limited theatrical release on 17 February 2023.

== Reception ==
=== Critical response ===
On the review aggregator website Rotten Tomatoes, 97% of 122 critics' reviews are positive, with an average rating of 8.1/10. The website's consensus reads: "Sensitively attuned to its protagonist's quest, Return to Seoul uses one woman's story to explore universal truths about the human condition." Metacritic, which uses a weighted average, assigned the film a score of 87 out of 100, based on 37 critics, indicating "universal acclaim".

In June 2025, IndieWire ranked the film at number 56 on its list of "The 100 Best Movies of the 2020s (So Far)."

== Accolades ==
Award	Date of ceremony	Category	Recipient(s)	Result	Ref.
Asia Pacific Screen Awards	11 November 2022	Best Film	Return to Seoul	Nominated	
Asia Pacific Screen Awards	11 November 2022	Best Director	Davy Chou	Won	
Asia Pacific Screen Awards	11 November 2022	Best New Performance	Park Ji-min	Won	
Asian Film Awards	12 March 2023	Best Director	Davy Chou	Nominated	
Asian Film Awards	12 March 2023	Best Supporting Actor	Oh Kwang-rok	Nominated	
Asian Film Awards	12 March 2023	Best Newcomer	Park Ji-min	Nominated	
Asian Film Awards	12 March 2023	Best Editing	Dounia Sichov	Nominated	
Asian Film Awards	12 March 2023	Best Music	Jérémie Arcache and Christophe Musset	Nominated	
Asian Film Awards	12 March 2023	Best Sound	Vincent Villa	Nominated	
Boston Society of Film Critics	11 December 2022	Best Film	Return to Seoul	Won	
Cannes Film Festival	27 May 2022	Un Certain Regard	Davy Chou	Nominated	
Lumière Awards	22 January 2024	Best Female Revelation	Park Ji-min	Nominated	
Magritte Award	9 March 2024	Best Foreign Film	Return to Seoul	Nominated	
Magritte Award	9 March 2024	Most Promising Actor	Yoann Zimmer	Nominated	
Sydney Film Festival	19 June 2022	Best Film	Return to Seoul	Nominated	

== See also ==
- List of submissions to the 95th Academy Awards for Best International Feature Film
- List of Cambodian submissions for the Academy Award for Best International Feature Film
