= The Road (2001 film) =

2001 Kazakhstani film by Darezhan Omirbaev

- Film poster
- Directed by: Darezhan Omirbaev
- Written by: Darezhan Omirbaev; Limara Zjeksembayeva
- Produced by: Limara Zjeksembayeva
- Starring: Jamshed Usmonov
- Cinematography: Boris Trochev
- Edited by: R. Belyakova
- Release date: 18 May 2001
- Running time: 85 minutes
- Country: Kazakhstan
- Language: Kazakh

The Road (Kazakh: Jol) is a 2001 Kazakhstani drama film directed by Darezhan Omirbaev. It was screened in the Un Certain Regard section at the 2001 Cannes Film Festival.

== Cast ==
- Jamshed Usmonov - Amir Kobessov
- Saule Toktybayeva - Amir's mother
- Alnur Turgambayeva - Amir's wife
- Magjane Omirbayev - Amir's son / Amir as a child
- Valeria Gouliaeva - Veronika, the waitress
- Valeri Skoribov - Censorship agent
- Moukhamedjane Alpisbaev - Amir's school friend
- Serik Aprimov - The avenging brother
