= Wife of a Spy =

2020 film

- Theatrical release poster

Japanese name
- Kanji: スパイの妻
Transcriptions
- Revised Hepburn: Supai no Tsuma
- Genre: Spy drama
- Screenplay by: Ryūsuke Hamaguchi; Tadashi Nohara; Kiyoshi Kurosawa
- Directed by: Kiyoshi Kurosawa
- Starring: Yū Aoi; Issey Takahashi
- Composer: Ryosuke Nagaoka
- Country of origin: Japan
- Original language: Japanese

Production
- Executive producers: Kei Shinohara; Keisuke Dobashi; Takashi Sawada; Hideyuki Okamoto; Satoshi Takada; Kubota Osamu
- Producer: Akihisa Yamamoto
- Cinematography: Tetsunosuke Sasaki
- Editor: Lee Hidemi
- Running time: 115 minutes
- Production companies: NHK Enterprises; CVI Entertainment

Original release
- Network: NHK
- Release: June 6, 2020

Wife of a Spy (Japanese: スパイの妻, Hepburn: Supai no Tsuma) is a 2020 Japanese spy drama film directed and co-written by Kiyoshi Kurosawa. Starring Yū Aoi and Issey Takahashi, the film is set in Japan during World War II, and centers on a wife who starts suspecting that her husband may be a spy for the United States.

A theatrical version of Wife of a Spy was selected in the main competition section of the 77th Venice International Film Festival, where it won the Silver Lion.

== Plot ==
Members of the Japanese military police seize and arrest a British silk merchant on charges of espionage.

In 1940, Yūsaku Fukuhara (Takahashi) runs an international import-export business in Kobe. After the arrest, and subsequent release, of the British merchant, a unit of the military police arrive at his office. Taiji (Higashide), the recently promoted leader of the unit and a childhood friend of Yūsaku's wife, warns Yūsaku that relevant authorities are keeping an eye on him under the National Mobilization Law, in part because of his preference for Western clothing, imported goods, and close contact with foreigners. Yūsaku is unconcerned with the growing tension in society and unaffected by Taiji's visit. The British merchant says goodbye to Yūsaku and his wife Satoko (Aoi) at their home and tells them he is going to Shanghai as he can no longer do business in Japan.

Satoko stars as a glamorous thief in an amateur heist film with Yūsaku's nephew Fumio (Bandō) and Yūsaku screens the film for his colleagues at the office's bōnenkai. After the new year, he informs Satoko that he and Fumio are going on a short business trip to Manchuria to import cheap medicine and other goods. Their trip is extended by two weeks and they return to Kobe with a woman whom Yūsaku does not mention to Satoko. Shortly after their return, Fumio announces that he will be leaving the company for a ryokan in Arima to write a novel about his experiences in Manchuria before he is drafted.

Satoko becomes increasingly suspicious of Yūsaku after learning about the woman who returned with her husband, Hiroko Kusakabe (Hyunri), after a tip-off from Taiji that Hiroko has been murdered and Yūsaku applied for passports for himself and Hiroko to leave the country. She visits Fumio in Arima and finds him disheveled and incandescent in his room, where he shouts at her about her unseeing ignorance of her husband's actions to maintain her comfortable lifestyle. He informs her that he is being watched by the military police, and gives her a package for Yūsaku, correctly assuming that the police standing outside the ryokan will not interrogate her. At home, Yūsaku explains what he and Fumio saw in Manchuria: biological experiments, including deliberately spreading plague, committed by Unit 731 (not explicitly named) on civilians in Manchuria. The package Satoko received from Fumio contained notes from one of the doctors procured by Hiroko, a copy translated into English by Fumio, and a short film of the facilities used for experimentation, corpses, vivisection, and the burning of bodies. Satoko accuses Yūsaku of being an American spy and unconcerned with their lives, but he explains he is not spying for any country; rather, he is making the information public in the name of justice.

In the office, Yūsaku puts the package from Fumio into a safe in the back of the office, but Satoko is able to open the safe using the combination she was given while shooting Yūsaku's short film. While she is closing the safe, she knocks over a chessboard and is unable to return the pieces to their correct position. Later, Yūsaku notices the chess pieces in the wrong positions, opens the safe, and realizes the Japanese notebook has been taken. Fumio is arrested by Taiji and the military police and tortured for sharing national secrets with the enemy. When Taiji summons Yūsaku to the office, he reveals that Fumio admitted to everything and that he worked alone. While Taiji doesn't believe Fumio's forced confession, he has the notebook which was turned into him by an anonymous citizen. Yūsaku returns home and questions Satoko, who admits she gave the notebook to Taiji, but she was sure that Fumio would not implicate Yūsaku even under torture. Together they watch the beginning of the short film which contains shots of the original Japanese notebook. Yūsaku admits that there is a second, longer film with better detail and more clarity that he plans to show the Americans.

In 1941, the U.S. places an oil embargo on Japan. Yūsaku's chances of leaving Japan to give the information of the illegal experiments to the Allies are almost nothing. While he cannot leave under legal means, he is able to smuggle himself out of the country in a shipping crate. Satoko agrees to go with him and help prepare for the trip. They exchange Japanese yen for watches and jewelry to pay for their journey overseas. Before they are about to leave, under the guise of taking a two-week trip so as to not arouse suspicion, Yūsaku decides they should split up. Satoko will take the film of the experiments in the shipping crate of a freighter, and he will go to America from Shanghai. However once Satoko is in the shipping crate, the military police search the ship for a stowaway and the man Yūsaku paid to smuggle Satoko shows the police where she is hiding. She is brought before Taiji and beseeches him to be the gentle person she knew in childhood, but he hits her across the face and says that she deserves death for treason. The military police screen the film Satoko was smuggling but it is revealed that Yūsaku swapped the film of the experiments with the amateur film he made of Satoko and Fumio months ago. With no other evidence to convict her, Satoko is released from police custody. Yūsaku is shown sailing away on a small fishing boat to Shanghai.

In March 1945, Satoko has been confined to a mental hospital for an untold number of months when Dr. Nozaki, a friend of hers and Yūsaku's, comes to see her and promises to get her out through his connections with Imperial University. He admits having heard a rumor that Yūsaku was seen in Bombay boarding a ship to Los Angeles which is believed to have sunk. That night, an air raid on Kobe destroys the hospital and Satoko leaves barefoot. She walks alone to the beach and collapses on the sand, screaming and crying.

The final scene states that Yūsaku Fukuhara was declared dead in 1946 but there were signs of forgery on the death certificate; Satoko Fukuhara left for the United States a few years later.

== Cast ==
- Yū Aoi as Satoko Fukuhara (福原 聡子, Fukuhara Satoko)
- Issey Takahashi as Yūsaku Fukuhara (福原 優作, Fukuhara Yūsaku)
- Masahiro Higashide as Taiji Tsumori (津森 泰治, Tsumori Taiji)
- Ryōta Bandō as Fumio Takeshita (竹下 文雄, Takeshita Fumio)
- Yuri Tsunematsu as Komako (駒子, Komako)
- Minosuke as Kanamura (金村, Kanamura)
- Hyunri as Hiroko Kusakabe (草壁 弘子, Kusakabe Hiroko)
- Takashi Sasano as Doctor Nozaki (野崎, Nozaki)

== Release ==
Wife of a Spy was first broadcast in Japan on NHK's NHK BS4K and NHK BS8K on 6 June 2020.

A theatrical version of the film, with different aspect ratio and color grading, had its world premiere at the 77th Venice International Film Festival on 8 September 2020. It was released in Japan on 16 October 2020 by Bitters End. It was also selected as closing film at the 51st International Film Festival of India. It was selected the Centerpiece Presentation for the 2021 Japan Cuts film festival.

The film's theatrical release grossed nearly $2.3 million.

== Reception ==
On the review aggregator website Rotten Tomatoes, 89% of 56 critics' reviews are positive. The website's consensus reads: "A finely calibrated WWII-era thriller, Wife of a Spy delicately balances the weight of national loyalty against our moral obligations to our fellow human beings." Metacritic, which uses a weighted average, assigned the film a score of 79 out of 100, based on 16 critics, indicating "generally favorable" reviews.

== Awards and nominations ==
Year	Award	Category	Recipient / Nominee	Result	Ref.
2020	77th Venice International Film Festival	Silver Lion	Kiyoshi Kurosawa	Won	
2021	15th Asian Film Awards	Best Film	Wife of a Spy	Won	
2021	15th Asian Film Awards	Best Director	Kiyoshi Kurosawa	Nominated	
2021	15th Asian Film Awards	Best Actress	Yū Aoi	Won	
2021	15th Asian Film Awards	Best Costume Design	Haruki Koketsu	Won	
2021	15th Asian Film Awards	Best Art Director	Norifumi Ataka	Nominated	
