= Boston Society of Film Critics Awards 2022 =

Annual US film awards ceremony

43rd BSFC Awards

December 11, 2022

Best Film:
Return to Seoul

The 43rd Boston Society of Film Critics Awards, honoring the best in filmmaking in 2022, were given on December 11, 2022.

== Winners ==
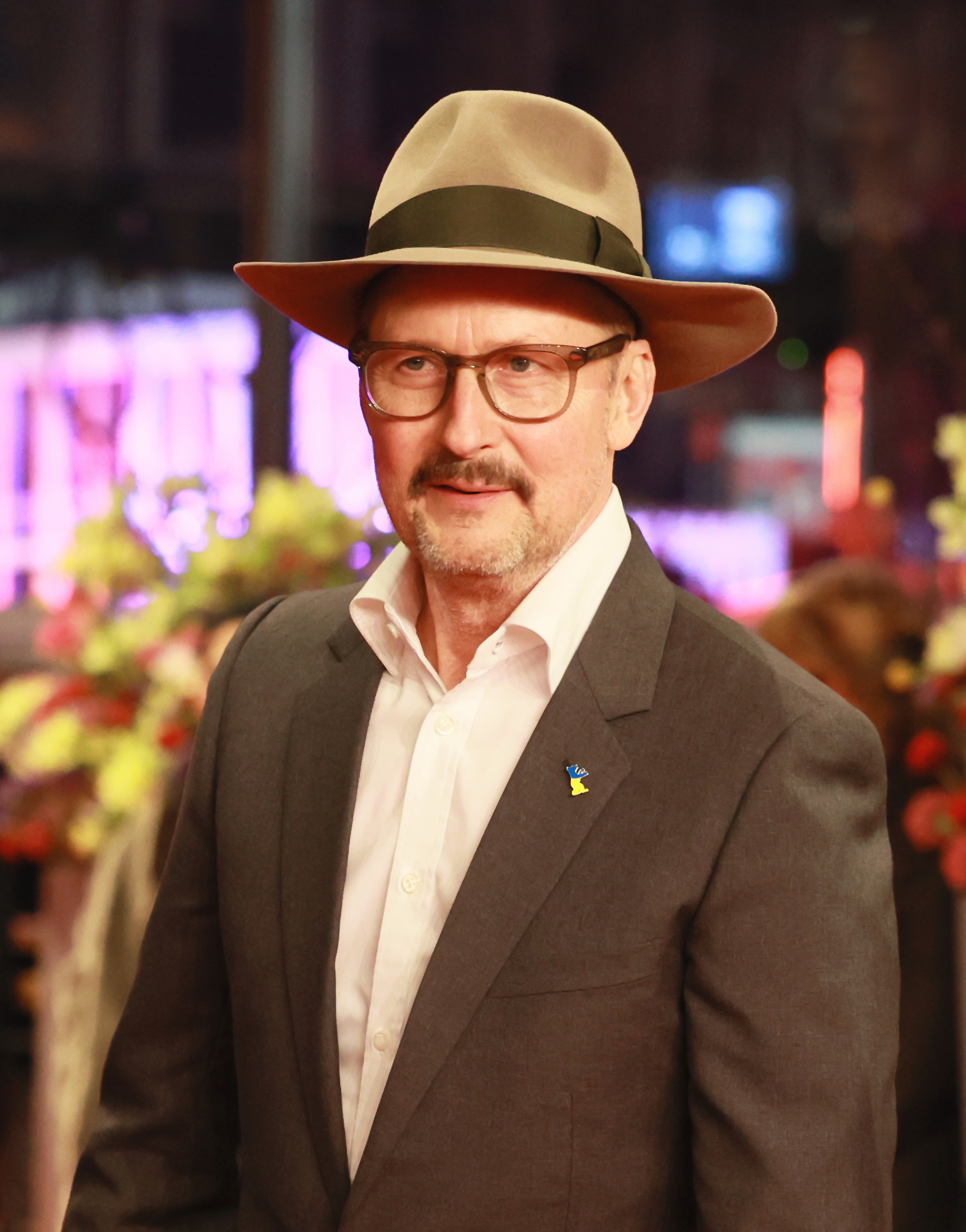
Todd Field, Best Director winner

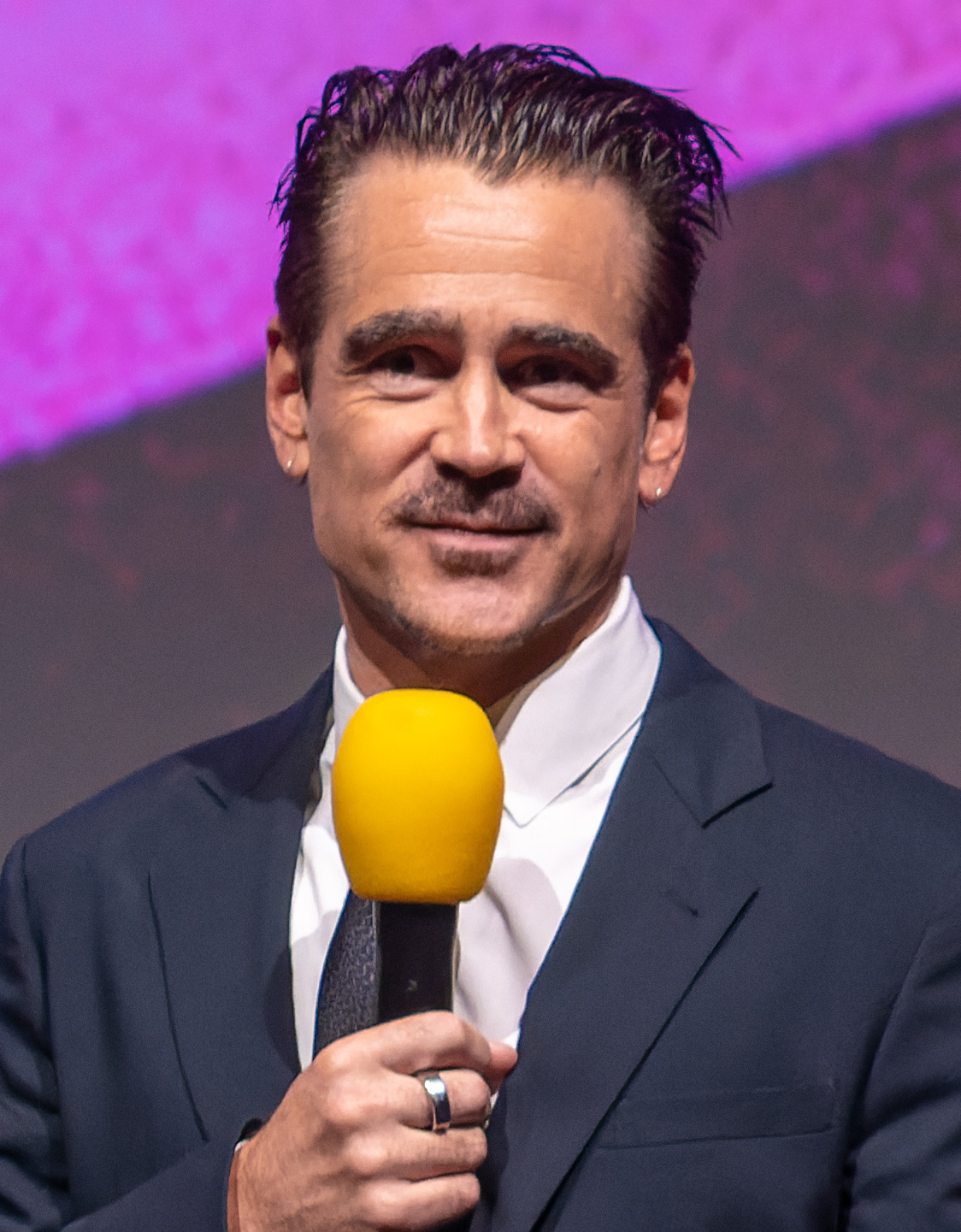
Colin Farrell, Best Actor winner

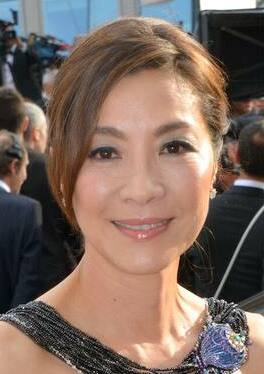
Michelle Yeoh, Best Actress winner

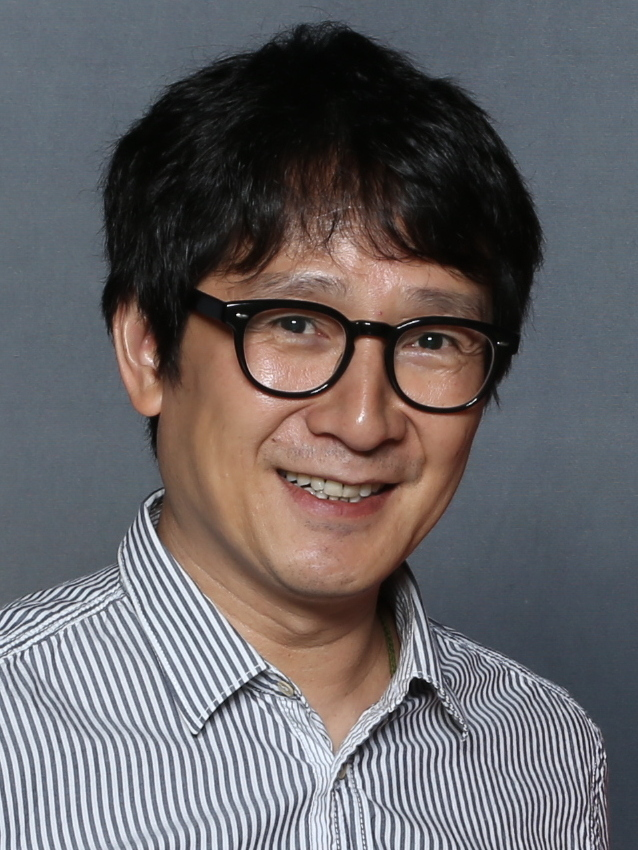
Ke Huy Quan, Best Supporting Actor winner

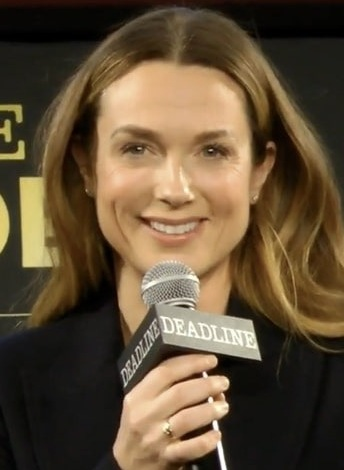
Kerry Condon, Best Supporting Actress winner

- Best Picture:
  - Return to Seoul
- Best Director:
  - Todd Field – Tár
- Best Actor:
  - Colin Farrell – After Yang / The Banshees of Inisherin
- Best Actress:
  - Michelle Yeoh – Everything Everywhere All at Once
- Best Supporting Actor:
  - Ke Huy Quan – Everything Everywhere All at Once
- Best Supporting Actress:
  - Kerry Condon – The Banshees of Inisherin
- Best Original Screenplay:
  - Martin McDonagh – The Banshees of Inisherin
- Best Adapted Screenplay:
  - Kogonada – After Yang
- Best Animated Film:
  - Turning Red
- Best Documentary:
  - All the Beauty and the Bloodshed
- Best English Language Film:
  - The Banshees of Inisherin
- Best Cinematography:
  - Eliot Rockett – Pearl / X
- Best Film Editing (TIE):
  - Blair McClendon – Aftersun / Kim Sang-bum – Decision to Leave
- Best Original Score:
  - M. M. Keeravani – RRR
- Best New Filmmaker:
  - Charlotte Wells – Aftersun
- Best Ensemble Cast (TIE):
  - Jackass Forever / Women Talking
