= Killer (1998 film) =

1998 film directed by Darezhan Omirbaev

- French: Tueur à gages
- Russian: Киллер
- Directed by: Darezhan Omirbaev
- Written by: Darezhan Omirbaev; Limara Zjeksembajeva
- Produced by: Joël Farges; Elise Jalladeau; Gaziz Shaldybayev
- Starring: Talgat Assetov; Roksana Abouova
- Cinematography: Boris Trochev
- Edited by: R. Belyakova
- Distributed by: Celluloid Dreams
- Release date: 12 September 1998 (Toronto)
- Running time: 80 minutes
- Countries: Kazakhstan; France
- Language: Russian

Killer (French: Tueur à gages; Russian: Киллер) is a 1998 French-Kazakhstani crime drama film directed by Darezhan Omirbaev.

== Plot ==
Marat (Talgat Assetov) is a chauffeur who, following a traffic accident, finds himself in debt. When his baby becomes ill, he agrees to murder a journalist in order to earn some money.

== Cast ==
- Talgat Assetov as Marat
- Roksana Abouova as Aijan

== Awards ==
Killer won the Un Certain Regard Award at the 1998 Cannes Film Festival. At the Karlovy Vary International Film Festival, it won the Don Quijote Award - Special Mention and was nominated for the Crystal Globe.
