= Poet (film) =

2021 film by Darezhan Omirbaev

- Official poster
- Directed by: Darezhan Omirbaev
- Written by: Darezhan Omirbayev
- Based on: The Author’s Evening by Hermann Hesse
- Produced by: Yuliya Kim; Yerzhan Akhmet
- Starring: Yerdos Kanayev; Gulmira Khasanova; Klara Kabylgazina
- Cinematography: Boris Troshev
- Edited by: Gulyaim Kozhamberdiyeva
- Production company: Kazakhfilm
- Distributed by: Paulo Branco; Alfama Films
- Release dates: 31 October 2021 (Tokyo); 14 December 2022 (France)
- Running time: 105 minutes
- Country: Kazakhstan
- Languages: Kazakh, Russian
- Box office: est. US$2,378

Poet (Kazakh: Ақын, Akyn) is a 2021 Kazakhstani drama film written and directed by Darezhan Omirbaev. Based on The Author’s Evening by Hermann Hesse, the film depicts story of Didar, a poet chained to his day job in a small newspaper. While reading about a 19th century famous Kazakh poet, Makhambet Otemisuly, who was executed by the authorities, he feels deeply shaken, realizing how difficult and fragile is the life of a poet. It had its world premiere at the 34th Tokyo International Film Festival on 31 October 2021, where it won best director award.

In February 2022 it was screened at 72nd Berlin International Film Festival. It was released theatrically in France on 14 December 2022.

== Cast ==
- Yerdos Kanayev as Didar
- Gulmira Khasanova as Zere
- Klara Kabylgazina as Poet's mother
- Serik Salkinbayev
- Bolat Shanin
- Aida Abdurakhman

== Production ==
Darezhan Omirbayev conceived the idea for the screenplay, when he was reading a short story The Author’s Evening by Hermann Hesse, whose lead character was an artist.

== Release ==
The film had its world premiere at the 34th Tokyo International Film Festival on 31 October 2021, where it won the best director award. It was invited at 72nd Berlin International Film Festival in 'Forum section'. On 18 August 2022, the film was screened at 46th Hong Kong International Film Festival in Global Vision section of World Cinema. On 21 October 2022, it was screened at the 2022 Vienna International Film Festival in Features section. In November 2022, it was invited at the Lisbon & Sintra Film Festival 2022, where it won the Best Film award.

== Reception ==
=== Critical response ===
In France, the AlloCiné rated the film 3.9/5, based on 12 reviews, which is an 'Average grade'.

Panos Kotzathanasis writing in Asian Movie Pulse praised Yerdos Kanaev, writing, "he, as Didar gives a very fitting performance". He opined that the "editing implements a slow pace" though "it toned down by the different cinematic elements". Concluding, Kotzathanasis felt the film is "excellent". He wrote, "Poet highlights that Darezhan Omirbayev is at the top of his art, particularly because he manages to present all his comments through an approach that is intelligent, funny, and rather artful at the same time." Joshua Morel at Critikat.com rated the film 3/5 and wrote, "Like its character, the film proves to be stubborn and never deviates from its line". Morel opined that "more than a fight, poetry appears in it as an enterprise of resistance which consists in detecting, within the very interior of the capitalist machine, the beauty nestled in the most trivial elements." Vincent Ostria of L'Humanité rated it with 5 stars and opined that Darezhan Omirbayev belongs to tongue-in-cheek movement, "which looks at the world in a dubious mode, while emphasising the beauty of a gesture and the irreducible strangeness of reality." Ostria concluded, "A rare, hushed and bewitching cinema."

=== Awards and nominations ===
Year	Award	Category	Nominated work/Recipient	Result	Ref
2021	34th Tokyo International Film Festival	Best Director	Darezhan Omirbaev	Won	
2022	Lisbon & Sintra Film Festival 2022	Best Film	Poet	Won	
2022	15th Asia Pacific Screen Awards	Best Film	Poet	Nominated	
2022	15th Asia Pacific Screen Awards	Best Cinematography	Boris Troshev	Nominated	
2022	15th Asia Pacific Screen Awards	Best Screenplay	Darezhan Omirbaev	Nominated	
2023	Asian Film Awards	Best Film	Poet	Nominated	
2023	Asian Film Awards	Best Director	Darezhan Omirbaev	Nominated	
