= When the Waves Are Gone =

2022 Philippine film by Lav Diaz

- Release movie poster
- Filipino: Kapag Wala Nang Mga Alon
- Directed by: Lav Diaz
- Screenplay by: Lav Diaz
- Starring: John Lloyd Cruz
- Cinematography: Larry Manda
- Edited by: Lav Diaz
- Production companies: Epicmedia; Films Boutique; Rosa Filmes; Snowglobe
- Release date: 5 September 2022 (Venice)
- Running time: 187 minutes
- Countries: Philippines; France; Portugal; Denmark
- Language: Filipino

When the Waves Are Gone (Filipino: Kapag Wala Nang Mga Alon) is a 2022 Philippine drama film written and directed by Lav Diaz. It stars John Lloyd Cruz, Ronnie Lazaro, Shamaine Buencamino, and Don Melvin Boongaling.

The film had its world premiere out of competition of the 79th Venice International Film Festival in 5 September 2022. At the 53rd International Film Festival of India, Diaz won the IFFI Special Jury Award and Special Mention.

== Premise ==
One of the top investigators in the Philippines, Lieutenant Hermes Papauran (John Lloyd Cruz), is at a moral crossroads. He witnesses first-hand the brutal anti-drug campaign that the police forces he is part of are implementing with dedication. Hermes is being physically and spiritually corroded by the crimes, leading to him catching a severe skin condition brought on by anxiety and guilt. As he tries to heal, a troubled history that haunts him eventually comes back for a reckoning.

== Cast ==
- John Lloyd Cruz
- Ronnie Lazaro
- Shamaine Buencamino
- Don Melvin Boongaling
- Anna Vilela de Costa
- Monica Calle
- Lucinda Loureiro
- Ronaliza Jintalan
- Aryanne Gollena
- Roel Laguerta
- Neil Alvin
- Danila Ledesma

== Reception ==
When the Waves Are Gone has an approval rating of 86% on review aggregator website Rotten Tomatoes, based on 7 reviews, and an average rating of 6.5/10.

== Prequel and sequel ==
In 2023, Diaz premiered Essential Truths of the Lake, which is a prequel to When Waves Are Gone, at the Locarno Film Festival. It was later announced that a third entry was in production that would complete The Hermes Trilogy.
