= Yellow Cat (film) =

2020 Kazakhstani film

- Film poster
- Directed by: Adilkhan Yerzhanov
- Starring: Azamat Nigmanov
- Release date: 10 September 2020 (Venice)
- Running time: 90 minutes
- Country: Kazakhstan
- Languages: Russian, Kazakh

Yellow Cat is a 2020 Kazakhstani comedy-drama film directed by Adilkhan Yerzhanov. It was selected as the Kazakhstani entry for the Best International Feature Film at the 94th Academy Awards, but it was not nominated.

== Cast ==
- Azamat Nigmanov as Kermek
- Kamila Nugmanova as Eva
- Sanjar Madi as Zhambas

== See also ==
- List of submissions to the 94th Academy Awards for Best International Feature Film
- List of Kazakhstani submissions for the Academy Award for Best International Feature Film
