= Darezhan Omirbaev =

Kazakh film director

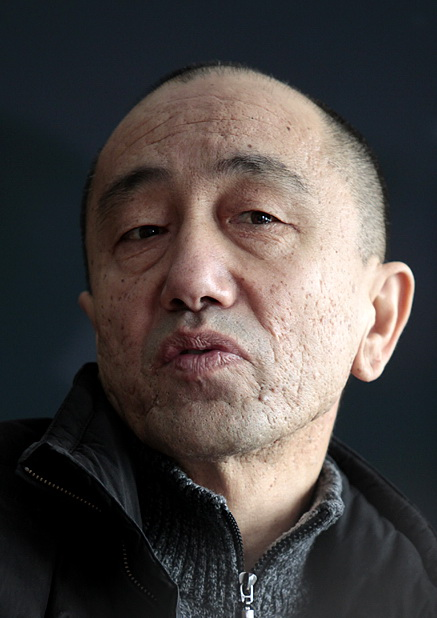
- Born: 15 March 1958 (age 68); Akkol, Kazakh SSR
- Occupations: Film director, screenwriter
- Years active: 1982–present

Darezhan Omirbaev (Kazakh: Дарежан Омiрбаев, Darejan Omırbaev; born 15 March 1958) is a Kazakh film director and screenwriter.

== Work ==
Omirbaev has directed nine films since 1982; six features, one medium length digital film, and three shorts. His second short, Shilde, shot in black and white, is autobiographical, as are his first two features Kairat (also shot in black and white) and Cardiogram, which premiered at the 52nd edition of the Venice Film Festival, winning the CICT/UNESCO Prize. Tueur à gages, a crime story inspired by Tolstoy's "The Forged Coupon", screened in the Un Certain Regard section at the 1998 Cannes Film Festival, where it won the Prize Un Certain Regard.

Jol, Omirbaev's subsequent film, was a return to autobiography, a poetic story of a filmmaker in the vein of 8 1/2, starring Tajik filmmaker Djamshed Usmonov. About Love, based on a story by Chekhov but also a kind of sequel to Kairat, was Omirbaev's contribution to the Jeonju Film Festival's annual collection of short digital pieces commissioned from filmmakers around the world.

Shuga and Student were departures for Omirbaev, both based on literary works - respectively, Tolstoy's Anna Karenina and Dostoyevsky's Crime and Punishment. Student competed in the Un Certain Regard section at the 2012 Cannes Film Festival.

== Filmography ==
- Zhizn (short) (1982)
- July (short) (1988)
- Kairat (1992)
- Cardiogram (1995)
- Killer (1998)
- The Road (2001)
- About Love (medium-length film included in Digital Sam in Sam Saek 2006: Talk to Her) (2006)
- Shuga (2007)
- Student (2012)
- Reverence (Documentary short, co-directed by Olga Korotko) (2013)
- Poet (2021)
- Last Screening (short) (2022)

== Awards and nominations ==
Year	Award	Category	Nominated work	Result	Ref
2023	Asian Film Awards	Best Director	Poet	Pending	
