= Davy Chou =

Cambodian-French filmmaker

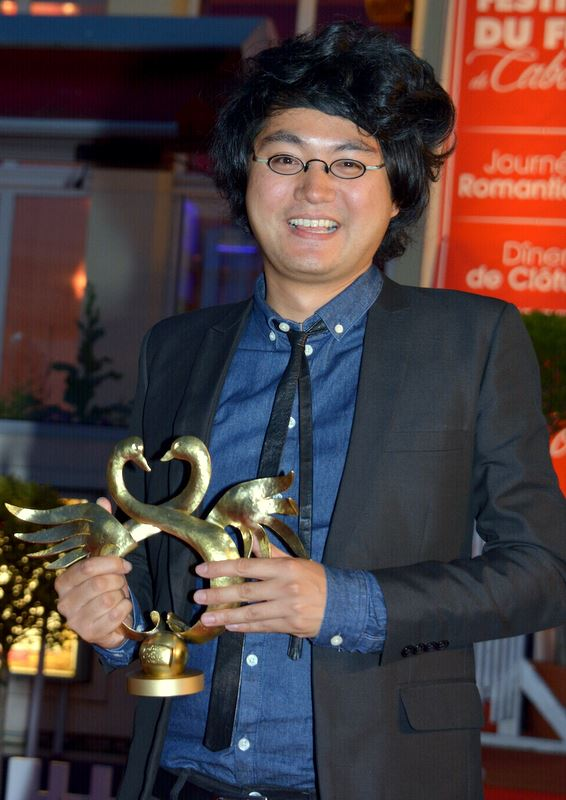
- Davy Chou
- Born: 13 August 1983 (age 43); Fontenay-aux-Roses, France
- Occupations: Filmmaker, artist

Davy Chou (Khmer: ដេវី ជូ; born 13 August 1983) is a Cambodian-French filmmaker. He has written, directed and produced several films. Chou made his feature length debut with Diamond Island (2016) and made his follow-up with the film Return to Seoul (2022).

Davy Chou founded the production company Vycky Films in 2009, with Jean-Jacky Goldberg and Sylvain Decouvelaere. In addition, Chou has worked to encourage filmmaking in Cambodia, creating a collective in 2009 that is allied with six universities. He helped organize and curate a heritage film festival in Phnom Penh in 2013, the first in Asia.

== Career ==
=== Early work ===
In 2009, Davy Chou created film workshops in Cambodia with six universities and 60 students, and helped to found a youth-driven filmmaking collective known as Kon Khmer Koun Khmer (កុនខ្មែរ កូនខ្មែរ, Khmer Films Khmer Generations). He was the producer of Twin Diamonds, a suspense film which was directed by the students.

After the suspense film, Chou and Kon Khmer Koun Khmer spearheaded the first film exhibition about films from the 1950s and '60s. Considered as the first 9-day festival of its kind in Cambodia, it screened 11 films from the period and exhibited film posters, photographs as well as biographies of the leading stars of the time at the Chinese House, a restored colonial building near the port of Phnom Penh. Davy Chou learned during his studies and research in Cambodia that between the 1950s and 1960s, more than 400 films were made.

Between 2010 and 2011, Chou moved to Cambodia in search of surviving witnesses (professionals, spectators, buildings) of the golden age of Cambodian cinema between 1960 and 1975. He learned that nearly 400 films were destroyed or lost under the Khmer Rouge regime. He interviewed actress Dy Saveth and filmmakers Ly Bun Yim, Yvon Hem (who died on August 10, 2012) and Ly You Sreang.

He produced Golden Slumbers (in French Le Sommeil d'Or'), a 100 minute documentary created from memories shared by Cambodian veteran film makers and actresses/actors. (In Khmer, the title is ដំណេក មាស, Dâmnek Meas). The documentary was released in theaters in France on September 19, 2012 and on DVD on April 3, 2012; it has been screened in many countries.

Golden Slumbers revived memories of Cambodia's pre-Khmer Rouge film industry and inspired a youth-driven revival of 1960s and '70s cinephilia. Chou explored Cambodia's cinematic heritage, and showed the struggle of the country's filmmakers as they weathered political turmoil, followed by critical-mass neglect of their work. Golden Slumbers was selected at many film festivals, including Forum Berlinale 2012 and Busan International Film Festival 2011.

In 2013, Chou returned to Phnom Penh to curate and coordinate Asia's first heritage film festival. His participation in the film industry in Cambodia has stimulated interest from a younger Cambodian generation of filmmakers and filmgoers.

Cambodia 2099 (2014) is a short movie set in Phnom Penh on Diamond Island, the country's pinnacle of modernity. Two friends tell each other about the dreams they had the night before. Cambodia 2099 was selected at Director's Fortnight 2014^{[} and won the Grand Prix of Festival du Film de Vendome 2014.

=== Prominence ===
His debut narrative feature-length film Diamond Island was screened in the Critics' Week section at the 2016 Cannes Film Festival and won the SACD Award. The project had been developed through the TorinoFilmLab Framework program in 2015.

Chou wrote and directed Return to Seoul (2022), a drama about a young Korean-French woman, raised from infancy in France, who travels to Seoul and begins to explore what it might mean for her. It was released in theaters in the United States and elsewhere in 2022. The film premiered at the Cannes Film Festival and was shortlisted for the Academy Award for Best International Feature Film. In spring 2023, it moved to streaming on Netflix, Amazon Prime, and other sources.

== Filmography ==
Short film

Year	Title	Director	Writer
2008	Expired	Yes	Yes
2014	Cambodia 2099	Yes	Yes

Documentary film

- Golden Slumbers (2012)

Feature film

Year	Title	Director	Writer
2016	Diamond Island	Yes	Yes
2022	Return to Seoul	Yes	Yes

== Accolades ==
Year	Award	Category	Title	Result	Ref.
2023	Asian Film Awards	Best Director	Return to Seoul	Nominated	
2022	Independent Spirit Awards	Best International Film	Return to Seoul	Nominated	
