= Zhang Yu (actor) =

Chinese actor (born 1982)

- 章宇
- Born: Zhang Xin (章鑫); September 25, 1982 (age 44); Duyun, Guizhou, China
- Education: Guizhou University
- Occupation: Actor
- Years active: 2005–present
- Height: 174 cm (5 ft 9 in)

Zhang Yu (Chinese: 章宇; pinyin: Zhāng Yǔ; born Zhang Xin on 25 September 1982) is a Chinese actor. Zhang became widely known in 2018 through three films: An Elephant Sitting Still, Dying to Survive and A Cool Fish. His performance as the leukaemia patient "Huang Mao" in Dying to Survive won him the Asian Film Award for Best Supporting Actor and earned him nominations at the Golden Horse Awards and the Golden Rooster Awards, and in 2019, he received the Best New Actor award at the Beijing College Student Film Festival. His later work includes the films Her Story (2024) and Front Teeth (2026) and the television series The First Shot (2024) and Crimes Against Humanity (2025).

== Early life and education ==
Zhang was born Zhang Xin on 25 September 1982 in Duyun, in the Qiannan Buyei and Miao Autonomous Prefecture of Guizhou. His parents and maternal grandparents had moved to Duyun from Chongqing during the Third Front campaign to work at the city's bridge factory, and he grew up in the factory's community, attending its school for employees' children and speaking "railway dialect", a variety close to Sichuanese used inside the factory. He loved singing in high school, but after he failed the entrance examination for vocal music, he was persuaded to try acting instead and was admitted to the College of Arts of Guizhou University. In 2003, while still a student, he was cast by the director Wang Xiaoshuai in a small role in Shanghai Dreams, which was filmed in Guiyang, which was his first film.

== Career ==
=== Stage and early film roles (2005–2017) ===
In 2005, Zhang joined the Guizhou Provincial Drama Troupe, where he rose to play leading roles in productions that won national awards. In 2008, after a provincial tour, he left the troupe for Beijing without formally resigning, having written in his diary, "In 2008, I should be in Beijing." His early years in Beijing were difficult; he worked as an assistant director and took small parts, mostly in independent films. In 2011, he played the lead role, Mengzi, in Pistol, a short film by the advertising director Lü Huizhou. His other films of this period included Feng Xiaogang's Aftershock (2010), Cai Shangjun's People Mountain People Sea (2011) and Song Chuan's Ciao Ciao (2017).

=== Breakthrough (2018–2019) ===
In 2018, Zhang played Yu Cheng, a small-time gangster, in Hu Bo's An Elephant Sitting Still, which won the Best Feature Film award at the 55th Golden Horse Awards. In Wen Muye's Dying to Survive, released that July, he played Peng Hao, known as "Huang Mao", a young leukaemia patient. Although he had only about a dozen lines, the role earned him nominations for the Golden Horse Award for Best Supporting Actor and the Golden Rooster Award for Best Supporting Actor at the 32nd Golden Rooster Awards, and in March 2019, he won the Asian Film Award for Best Supporting Actor at the 13th Asian Film Awards. In November 2018, he played the bungling robber Hu Guangsheng in Rao Xiaozhi's A Cool Fish, which was filmed in his home province of Guizhou.

In September 2018, he was named New Actor of the Year at the GQ China Men of the Year awards, and in 2019, he was nominated for Actor of the Year by the China Film Directors' Guild. He also won the Best New Actor award at the 26th Beijing College Student Film Festival and a Youth Power award from Southern People Weekly. After his success, he received many offers, but he turned most of them down in 2019 to adjust to being in the public eye.

=== Leading roles (2020–present) ===
In 2020, Zhang played a police officer in the anthology film My People, My Homeland. In Li Xiaofeng's Back to the Wharf, released on 6 November 2020, he starred opposite Song Jia as Song Hao, a top student whose life is upended after he accidentally kills a man; the film had competed for the Golden Goblet Award at the Shanghai International Film Festival earlier that year. In 2021, he played a blind singer in Are You Lonesome Tonight? and starred with Ma Li in Geng Jun's Manchurian Tiger, which won the Golden Goblet Award for Best Feature Film at the 24th Shanghai International Film Festival in June 2021.

In February 2022, he appeared in Wen Muye's Nice View and played the marksman Liu Wenwu in Zhang Yimou and Zhang Mo's war film Sniper, for which he was nominated for the Golden Deer Award for Best Actor at the 17th China Changchun Film Festival. In 2023, he starred with Zhou Dongyu in Tainted Love, a film about a romance scam, released on 15 September, and in Hao Feihuan's mystery film Record Without Words, for which he won the Fei Mu Award for Best Actor at the 7th Pingyao International Film Festival in October 2023; the film was released in China on 1 December.

In 2024, he starred with Huang Jingyu in the crime series The First Shot, which began airing on 3 September, and appeared with Song Jia and Zhong Chuxi in Shao Yihui's comedy Her Story. In 2025, he appeared in Wang Mu's The One, Peter Chan's She's Got No Name and Rao Xiaozhi's Made in Yiwu 3, a follow-up to A Cool Fish in which he starred with Ren Suxi. In December 2025, he starred in Crimes Against Humanity, a television series about Unit 731, which began airing on Youku and Jiangsu Television on 13 December. In 2026, he starred with Chen Haoyu in Front Teeth, released on 1 May, and appeared in Cao Dun's historical film Heroes of Dunhuang, which had finished filming in January 2023 and was released on 25 September 2026.

== Filmography ==
=== Film ===
Year	English title	Chinese title	Role	Ref.
2005	Shanghai Dreams	青红	Minor role	
2008	Water Phoenix	水凤凰	Da Shangou	
2010	Aftershock	唐山大地震	Soldier of the 38th Army	
2010	A Beautiful Mistake	美丽的错误	Xu Shangshu	
2010	The Cockfighter	斗鸡人	Xiao Mao	
2011	Old Home, New Home	老家新家	Yu Sanxi	
2011	Pistol (short film)	手枪	Mengzi	
2012	@Bridesmaid	@伴娘	Lin Zehao	
2012	Entertainment Is a Circle	娱乐是个圈	Song Yu	
2012	Spring Blossoms	美好2012之春暖花开	Xinzi	
2012	Love in an Old Town	古镇情	Sun Bo	
2012	People Mountain People Sea	人山人海	Liu Fang, a Guizhou police officer	
2015	Daylight Murder	白日杀机	Chen Wei	
2016	Elegy of the Homeland	热土悲歌	Dachun	
2017	Ciao Ciao	巧巧	Li Wei	
2018	An Elephant Sitting Still	大象席地而坐	Yu Cheng	
2018	Dying to Survive	我不是药神	Peng Hao ("Huang Mao")	
2018	A Cool Fish	无名之辈	Hu Guangsheng	
2020	My People, My Homeland	我和我的家乡	Police officer	
2020	Back to the Wharf	风平浪静	Song Hao	
2021	Are You Lonesome Tonight?	热带往事	Blind singer	
2022	Manchurian Tiger	东北虎	Xu Dong	
2022	Nice View	奇迹·笨小孩	Ma Yue	
2022	Sniper	狙击手	Liu Wenwu	
2023	Tainted Love	鹦鹉杀	Lin Zhiguang	
2023	Record Without Words	沉默笔录	Li Lizhong	
2024	Her Story	好东西	Xiao Ma	
2025	The One	独一无二	Yu Zhicheng	
2025	She's Got No Name	酱园弄·悬案	Liang, a forensic pathologist	
2025	Made in Yiwu 3	无名之辈：否极泰来	Chen Sanjin	
2026	Front Teeth	门牙	Li Weiyang	
2026	Heroes of Dunhuang	敦煌英雄	Lang Yaozi	

=== Television series ===
Year	English title	Chinese title	Role	Ref.
2024	The First Shot	雪迷宫	Jiang Xiaohai	
2025	Crimes Against Humanity	反人类暴行	Chen Ruping (Arakawa Ryōhei)	

== Awards and nominations ==
Year	Award	Category	Nominated work	Result	Ref.
2018	55th Golden Horse Awards	Best Supporting Actor	Dying to Survive	Nominated	
2018	GQ China Men of the Year	New Actor of the Year	—	Won	
2019	10th China Film Directors' Guild Awards	Actor of the Year	A Cool Fish	Nominated	
2019	13th Asian Film Awards	Best Supporting Actor	Dying to Survive	Won	
2019	26th Beijing College Student Film Festival	Best New Actor	Dying to Survive	Won	
2019	Southern People Weekly Youth Power Awards	Youth Power Award	—	Won	
2019	32nd Golden Rooster Awards	Best Supporting Actor	Dying to Survive	Nominated	
2022	17th China Changchun Film Festival	Golden Deer Award for Best Actor	Sniper	Nominated	
2023	7th Pingyao International Film Festival	Fei Mu Award for Best Actor	Record Without Words	Won	
2025	17th Macau International Movie Festival	Best Supporting Actor	The One	Nominated	
