= François Nodot =

François Nodot (c. 1650–1710) was a mercenary soldier and author of works in Latin and French. He is best known as author of spurious supplements to the text of the Satyricon of Petronius.

In 1692 he announced to the French academies that he had a copy of previously unknown sections of the Satyricon. The copy had been made from a manuscript found by his friend Du Pin during the siege of Belgrade in 1688.

Nodot published a new edition of the Satyricon at Paris in 1693. The forgery was soon suspected, but texts and translations of the Satyricon continued to incorporate Nodot's supplements until the early 20th century.

== Bibliography ==
- Laes, Christian, "Forging Petronius: François Nodot and the Fake Petronian Fragments" in Humanistica Lovaniensia 47 (1998) 358-402
