= Pieter Burmann =

Pieter Burmann may refer to:

- Pieter Burman the Elder (1668–1741), Dutch classical scholar
- Pieter Burman the Younger (1714–1778), Dutch philologist
