= W. C. Firebaugh =

W. C. Firebaugh was the author of two works on the history of inns and taverns, and also of a fine English translation of Petronius's Satyricon, the fragmentary realistic novel of low life under the Roman Empire.

The translation was published in 1922 in New York, in a very expensive ($30) limited edition, by Horace Liveright, founder of the Modern Library. Like earlier English translations, but more completely, Firebaugh's Satyricon includes the spurious supplements devised by various early scholars and forgers in an attempt to round out the fragmentary story. Firebaugh was however careful to distinguish all these supplements from the real translated text. His is still the only English translation of the supplement by José Marchena, which, because of its obscenity, had previously been printed only in the original Latin.

The 1923 publication includes a sequence of 100 etchings by the Australian artist Norman Lindsay, originally used in the even rarer 1910 Satyricon edited by Stephen Gaselee.

The original text, the etchings, and the Marchena supplement were all arguably pornographic by the strict standards of English-language publishing in the 1920s. John S. Sumner, secretary of the New York Society for the Suppression of Vice, obtained a copy before publication and accused Liveright of selling obscene material directed to the public. After a celebrated trial the case was dismissed by the New York court.

Four years after the initial publication of Firebaugh's Satyricon, a version adapted for a general market was published by Liveright in 1927. It was edited by Charles Whibley.

== Works ==
- The Satyricon of Petronius Arbiter. Complete and unexpurgated translation by W. C. Firebaugh, in which are incorporated the forgeries of Nodot and Marchena, and the readings introduced into the text by De Salas. (New York, Boni and Liveright, 1922)
- The Inns of the Middle Ages. (Reprint, Kessinger Publishing, 2005: ISBN 1-4179-6013-2)
- The Inns of Greece and Rome, and a history of hospitality from the dawn of time to the Middle Ages (Chicago, 1928. Reprint, New York, Benjamin Blom, 1972)

== See also ==
- Satyricon
- Supplements to the Satyricon

== Bibliography ==
- Dardis, Tom, 1995, Firebrand: The Life of Horace Liveright, New York: Random House
- Boroughs, Rod, 2000, "Petronius on trial" in The Petronian Society newsletter vol. 30.
