= Fellini Satyricon =

1969 film by Federico Fellini

- Italian theatrical release poster
- Directed by: Federico Fellini
- Screenplay by: Federico Fellini; Bernardino Zapponi; Brunello Rondi; Charles Wood
- Based on: Satyricon by Petronius
- Produced by: Alberto Grimaldi
- Starring: Martin Potter; Hiram Keller; Max Born; Salvo Randone; Magali Noël; Alain Cuny; Lucia Bosè; Tanya Lopert; Capucine
- Cinematography: Giuseppe Rotunno
- Edited by: Ruggero Mastroianni
- Music by: Nino Rota; İlhan Mimaroğlu; Tod Dockstader; Andrew Rudin
- Production company: Produzioni Europee Associati
- Distributed by: United Artists
- Release dates: 3 September 1969 (Rome premiere); 18 September 1969 (Italy)
- Running time: 129 minutes
- Country: Italy
- Languages: Italian; Latin
- Budget: US$3 million
- Box office: $1.4 million (US/ Canada rentals); $8 million (outside Italy)

Fellini Satyricon, or simply Satyricon, is a 1969 Italian film written and directed by Federico Fellini and loosely based on Petronius's work Satyricon, written during the reign of Emperor Nero and set in Imperial Rome. The film "uses the pre-Christian Roman world of debauchery during the time of Nero as an analogue of the modern post-Christian period." The film is divided into nine episodes, following Encolpius (Martin Potter) and his friend Ascyltus (Hiram Keller) as they try to win the heart of a young boy named Gitón within a surreal and dreamlike Roman landscape.

Fellini Satyricon was entered into the 30th Venice International Film Festival, where it won the Pasinetti Award for Best Italian Film. It received acclaim from international critics, with particular praise toward Fellini's direction and Danilo Donati's vivid production design. The film earned Fellini his third Oscar nomination for Best Director, and the film was nominated for the Golden Globe Award for Best Foreign Language Film.

== Plot ==
The film opens on a graffito-covered wall with Encolpius lamenting the loss of his lover Gitón to Ascyltus. Vowing to win him back, he learns at the Thermae that Ascyltus sold Gitón to the actor Vernacchio. At the theatre, he discovers Vernacchio and Gitón performing in a lewd play called the "Emperor's Miracle": a slave's hand is axed off and replaced with a gold one. Encolpius storms the stage and reclaims Gitón. On their return to Encolpius's home in the Insula Felicles, a Roman tenement building, they walk through the vast Roman brothel known as the Lupanare, observing numerous sensual scenes. They fall asleep after making love at Encolpius's place. Ascyltus sneaks into the room, waking Encolpius with a whiplash. Since both share the tenement room, Encolpius proposes they divide up their property and separate. Ascyltus mockingly suggests they split Gitón in half. Encolpius is driven to suicidal despair, however, when Gitón decides to leave with Ascyltus. At that moment, an earthquake destroys the tenement.

Encolpius meets the poet Eumolpus at the art museum. The elderly poet blames current corruption on the mania for money and invites his young friend to a banquet held at the villa of Trimalchio, a wealthy freeman, and his wife Fortunata. Eumolpus's declamation of poetry is met with catcalls and thrown food. While Fortunata performs a frantic dance, the bored Trimalchio turns his attention to two very young boys. Scandalized, Fortunata berates her husband, who attacks her then has her covered in gizzards and gravy. Fancying himself a poet, Trimalchio recites one of his finer poems whereupon Eumolpus accuses him of stealing verses from Lucretius. Enraged, Trimalchio orders the poet to be tortured by his slaves in the villa's huge kitchen furnace. The guests are then invited to visit Trimalchio's tomb where he enacts his own death in an ostentatious ceremony. The story of the Matron of Ephesus is recounted, the first story within a story in the film. Encolpius finally leaves the villa, helping the limping, beaten Eumolpus to drink water from a pool in a tilled field. In return for his kindness, Eumolpus bequeaths the spirit of poetry to his young friend.

The next morning Encolpius, Gitón, and Ascyltus are imprisoned on the pirate ship of Lichas, a middle-aged merchant; they are part of a consignment of attractive young men being delivered for the titillation of the reclusive Roman emperor. Lichas selects Encolpius for a Greco-Roman wrestling match and quickly subdues him. Smitten by his beauty, Lichas takes Encolpius as his spouse in a wedding ceremony blessed by his wife, Tryphaena. After a long voyage the ship arrives at the emperor's private island, only to find it overrun by soldiers in the service of a usurper. The teenage emperor kills himself, and the soldiers board the ship and behead Lichas under Tryphaena's satisfied gaze. While "new Caesar" holds a fearsome victory parade back in Rome, Encolpius and Ascyltus escape the soldiers and make their way inland. They discover an abandoned villa, whose owners have freed their slaves and committed suicide to escape the new emperor. Encolpius and Ascyltus spend the night on the property and make love with an African slave girl who has stayed behind. Fleeing the villa when soldiers on horseback arrive in the courtyard to burn the owners' corpses, the two friends reach a desert. Ascyltus placates a nymphomaniac's demands in a covered wagon while Encolpius waits outside, listening to the woman's servant discuss a hermaphrodite demi-god reputed to possess healing powers at the Temple of Ceres. With the aid of a mercenary, they kill two men and kidnap the hermaphrodite in the hope of obtaining a ransom. Once exposed to the desert sun, however, the hermaphrodite sickens and dies of thirst. Enraged, the mercenary tries to murder his two companions but is overpowered and killed.

Captured by soldiers, Encolpius is released in a labyrinth and forced to play Theseus to a gladiator's Minotaur for the amusement of spectators at the festival of Momus, the god of laughter. When the gladiator spares Encolpius's life because of his well-spoken words of mercy, the festival rewards the young man with Ariadne, a sensual woman with whom he must copulate as the crowd looks on. Impotent, Encolpius is publicly humiliated by Ariadne. Eumolpus offers to take him to the Garden of Delights where prostitutes are said to effect a cure for his impotence, but the treatment—gentle whipping of the buttocks—fails miserably. In the second of the stories within a story in the film, the owner of the Garden of Delights narrates the tale of Oenothea to Encolpius. For having rejected his advances and humiliating him, a sorcerer curses a beautiful young woman: she must spend her days kindling fires for the village's hearths from her genitalia. Inspired, Encolpius and Ascyltus hire a boatman to take them to Oenothea's home. Greeted by an old woman who has him drink a potion, Encolpius falls under a spell where his sexual prowess is restored to him by Oenothea in the form of an Earth Mother figure and sorceress. When Ascyltus is murdered in a field by the boatman, Encolpius decides to join Eumolpus's ship bound for North Africa. But Eumolpus has died in the meantime, leaving as his heirs all those willing to eat his corpse. Encolpius has not the stomach for this last and bitter mockery but is nonetheless invited by the captain to board the ship. In a voice-over, Encolpius explains that he set sail with the captain and his crew. His words end in mid-sentence, as does Petronius's book, when a distant island appears on the horizon and the film cuts abruptly to frescoes of the film's characters on a crumbling wall.

== Cast ==
- Martin Potter as Encolpius
- Hiram Keller as Ascyltus
- Max Born as Gitón
- Salvo Randone as Eumolpus
- Mario Romagnoli as Trimalchio
- Magali Noël as Fortunata
- Capucine as Tryphaena
- Alain Cuny as Lichas
- Fanfulla as Vernacchio
- Donyale Luna as Oenothea
- Danika La Loggia as Scintilla
- Giuseppe Sanvitale as Habinnas
- Eugenio Mastropietro as Hermeros
- Lucia Bosè as the suicidal wife
- Joseph Wheeler as the suicidal husband
- Hylette Adolphe as the slave girl
- Tanya Lopert as the Emperor
- Gordon Mitchell as the thief
- Luigi Montefiori as the Minotaur
- Marcella Di Folco as the Proconsul
- Elisa Mainardi as Arianna
- Pasquale Baldassarre as Hermaphroditus
- Carlo Giordana as the ship captain
- Alvaro Vitali as Julius Caesar
- Sibilla Sedat as Nymphomaniac
- Lorenzo Piani as Nymphomaniac's husband
- Federico Boido as Scarface
- Samson Burke as gladiator
- Francesco Di Giacomo as lyre player
- Richard Simmons as a slave
- Suleiman Ali Nashnush as Tryphaena's attendant
- Jessica Dublin as dancer at feast
- Carole André as boy kissing boy
- Renato Zero

== Adaptation ==
Petronius's Satyricon survives only in fragments. While recuperating from a debilitating illness in 1967, Fellini reread the Satyricon and was fascinated by the missing parts, which created large gaps between one episode and the next. The text's fragmentary nature encouraged him to go beyond the traditional approach of recreating the past in film and create a dreamlike atmosphere. In Comments on Film, Fellini explained that his goal for the film was "to eliminate the borderline between dream and imagination: to invent everything and then to objectify the fantasy; to get some distance from it in order to explore it as something all of a piece and unknowable." Critic Christopher Sharrett observes that Fellini's "adaptation also reveals the paucity of the source, the kitschiness of the 'big ideas' from literary history. Genre film is a comfortable vehicle for the critical agenda undertaken, as Fellini piles up genre tropes as a way of showing the inherent generic contrivance, the 'trashiness,' that is basic to all such representation."

The most important of the narrative changes that Fellini makes to Petronius's text is the addition of a battle between Encolpius and the Minotaur in the Labyrinth, thereby linking Encolpius to Theseus and the journey into the unconscious. The scene also connects Fellini's film to Apuleius's The Golden Ass, the only other surviving Roman novel, the protagonist of which also becomes the subject of mockery at a festival to a god of laughter.

Other original sequences include a nymphomaniac in a desert caravan whose despondent husband pays Ascyltus and Encolpius to couple with her, and a hermaphrodite worshipped as a demigod at the temple of Ceres. Abducted by the two protagonists and a mercenary, the hermaphrodite later dies a miserable death in a desert landscape that, in Fellini's adaptation, is posed as an ill-omened event, none of which is to be found in the Petronian version.

Though the two protagonists, Encolpius and Ascyltus, appear throughout, the characters and locations surrounding them change unexpectedly. This intentional technique of fragmentation conveys Fellini's view of both the original text and the nature of history itself, and is echoed visually in the film's final shot of a ruined villa whose walls, painted with frescoes of the scenes we have just seen, are crumbling, fading and incomplete. Fellini's interest in Carl Jung's theory of the collective unconscious is also on display with an abundance of archetypes in highly dreamlike settings.

== Production ==
Fellini's project saw competition from another film titled Satyricon, released the same year. Producer Alfredo Bini had registered the Satyricon title in 1962. When Fellini and his producer Alberto Grimaldi started work on their film, Bini contracted Gian Luigi Polidoro to direct his own version. Grimaldi sued Bini to halt the competing film, but lost; as a result, Fellini's picture was titled Fellini Satyricon to distinguish it.

Filming took place primarily at Cinecittà Studios, on sets designed by Danilo Donati, who also designed the production's costumes. The film also used exteriors locations at Fiumicino, Latina, and the Pontine Islands. The cavern sequences were filmed below the Roman Colosseum. Co-screenwriter Bernardino Zapponi noted that Fellini used a deliberately jerky form of dubbing that caused the dialogue to appear out of sync with the actors' lips; this was in keeping with his intention of invoking the distancing effect.

== Release ==
=== Home media ===
Fellini Satyricon was released on VHS by 20th Century Fox Home Entertainment on 7 September 1999. The film was then released on DVD by Metro-Goldwyn-Mayer Home Entertainment on 10 April 2001, for Region 1 and on 15 May 2005, for the German market.

On 24 February 2015, The Criterion Collection released the film, newly restored through a 4K digital transfer, on Blu-ray and DVD for Region A and Region 1 respectively. The restoration was supervised by the film's cinematographer Giuseppe Rotunno. Both of the editions include the film's original trailer, an audio commentary of Eileen Lanouette Hughes's memoir On the Set of "Fellini Satyricon": A Behind-the-Scenes Diary, Gideon Bachmann's hour-long documentary Ciao, Federico!, archival interviews with the film's director Federico Fellini, a new interview with Rotunno done in 2011, a new exclusively made documentary titled Fellini and Petronius featuring discussions between classicists Luca Canali and Joanna Paul about the film's adaptation of Satyricon, a new interview with Mary Ellen Mark, a photographer for Look magazine, about her experiences as a set photographer for the film, a gallery of ephemera related to the film, new English subtitles, and a leaflet containing a new essay by author and film scholar Michael Wood. Exclusive to the Blu-ray edition is the addition of an uncompressed monaural soundtrack. The new Blu-ray and DVD cover and interior poster was illustrated by Edward Kinsella and designed by Eric Skillman. On 27 April 2015, Eureka Entertainment released the film on Blu-ray in the United Kingdom as part of the Masters of Cinema series, using as a foundation the 4K digital transfer done for the Criterion release. This release includes a 36-page booklet and the film's original trailer.

== Reception ==
=== Italy ===
First screened at the 30th Venice Film Festival on 4 September 1969, Fellini Satyricon received generally positive reviews from critics writing in "stunned bewilderment". Time reported that the "normally reserved press corps gave the film a five-minute ovation ... the Venice showing was so wildly popular that festival tickets, normally 2,000 lire ($3.20), were being sold on the black market at 60,000 lire (about $100) apiece". Fellini biographer Tullio Kezich noted that there were "no outright negative reactions. The rampant moralizing of ten years ago seems to have passed out of fashion". In his favorable Corriere della Sera review, Giovanni Grazzini argued that "Fellini's Rome bears absolutely no relationship to the Rome we learned about in school books. It is a place outside historical time, an area of the unconscious in which the episodes related by Petronius are relived among the ghosts of Fellini ... His Satyricon is a journey through a fairytale for adults. It is evident that Fellini, finding in these ancient personages the projection of his own human and artistic doubts, is led to wonder if the universal and eternal condition of man is actually summed up in the frenzied realization of the transience of life which passes like a shadow. These ancient Romans who spend their days in revelry, ravaged by debauchery, are really an unhappy race searching desperately to exorcise their fear of death".

Kezich saw the film as a study in self-analysis:

Everything seems to be aimed at making the viewer feel ill at ease, at giving him the impression that he is watching for the first time scenes from a life he never dreamed could have existed. Fellini has described his film as 'science fiction of the past', as though the Romans of that decadent age were being observed by the astounded inhabitants of a flying saucer. Curiously enough, in this effort of objectivity, the director has created a film that is so subjective as to warrant psychoanalysis. It is pointless to debate whether the film proposes a plausible interpretation of ancient Rome, or whether in some way it illustrates Petronius: the least surprising parts are those that come closest to Petronius's text or that have some vague historical significance.

The film performed well at the box office in Italy, France, and Japan.

The film was selected as the Italian entry for the Best Foreign Language Film at the 42nd Academy Awards, but was not accepted as a nominee. The following year, Fellini was nominated for the Academy Award for Best Director.

=== United States ===
Pauline Kael considered Fellini Satyricon a "freak show" and a "bad movie, a terrible movie", but thought that it would be a considerable success.

The film holds a 76% rating on Rotten Tomatoes, based on 34 reviews, with an average rating of 6.8/10. The website's critical consensus states: "Episodic and strange, Satyricon offers a hedonistic tour through an ancient Rome that exists not in history books, but from Federico Fellini's singular imagination".

As co-producers keen to recoup their investment, executives at United Artists made certain that Fellini received "a maximum of exposure" during his American promotional tour of the film by organizing press and television interviews in New York and Los Angeles. For Vincent Canby of The New York Times, Satyricon was "the quintessential Fellini film ... a travelogue through an unknown galaxy." Roger Ebert of The Chicago-Sun Times originally stated the film was a masterpiece, and he ranked the film 10th in his 10 Best Films of 1970 list. He later explained he was unsure the film was in fact a masterpiece, but nonetheless gave the film a high retrospective rating in 2001. He wrote: "It is so much more ambitious and audacious than most of what we see today that simply as a reckless gesture, it shames these timid times." For Archer Winston of the New York Post, the film's classical background in Petronius was fused into "a powerful contemporary parallel. It is so beautifully composed and imagined that you would do yourself a disservice if, for any reason, you allowed yourself to miss it". Fellini biographer Parker Tyler declared it "the most profoundly homosexual movie in all history".

== See also ==
- List of Italian submissions for the Academy Award for Best Foreign Language Film
- List of submissions to the 42nd Academy Awards for Best Foreign Language Film
