= Her Story (2024 film) =

2024 Chinese comedy-drama film

- Theatrical release poster
- Chinese: 好东西
- Literal meaning: Good Things
- Hanyu Pinyin: Hǎo dōng xī
- Directed by: Shao Yihui
- Screenplay by: Shao Yihui
- Produced by: Lizhi Chen; Ruoqing Fu; Jianfei Guo; Li Jie; Wang Jun; Lingbin Kong; Yang Yue; Yulong Zhu; Yan Zhuang
- Starring: Song Jia; Zhong Chuxi; Zeng Mumei; Zhang Yu
- Distributed by: Shanghai Tao Piao Piao Movie & TV Culture Co., Ltd. Shanghai Film Co., Ltd.
- Release date: November 22, 2024
- Running time: 123 minutes
- Country: China
- Language: Mandarin
- Box office: $98.4 million

Her Story (Chinese: 好东西; pinyin: Hǎo dōngxi; lit. 'Good Things') is a 2024 Chinese comedy-drama film directed by Shao Yihui, and starring Song Jia, Zhong Chuxi, Zeng Mumei and Zhang Yu. The story revolves around Wang Tiemei, a single mother, and her child who move into a new home and become acquainted with their neighbor, Xiao Ye. The two women, each with contrasting personalities, form a unique bond.

Her Story was released on 22 November 2024. The film received critical acclaim for its screenplay, direction and performances. On Chinese movie review website Douban, it is listed as the highest-rated Chinese-language film of 2024.

== Plot ==
Set in Shanghai, the film follows Wang Tiemei, a single mother raising her daughter, Wang Moli. They move into an old 1900's style building. Riding her segway outside late that night, she meets her neighbor, Xiao Ye, while saving her from a stalker. Despite their differences, they form a close bond, with Xiao Ye inviting her and her daughter to her band's performance.

Wang Tiemei’s past remains a source of struggle, particularly with the interference of her nosy ex-husband. She is a journalist writing about controversial topics (celebrity gossip and women's rights) and thanks to her Moli has good writing skills and consistently scores well on class essays. She suggests Moli learn to play drums after watching the concert.

Xiao Ye provides Wang Tiemei with a different perspective on relationships and self-worth, encouraging her to embrace change. As Wang Moli’s interest in music grows, Xiao Ye gets her bandmate Xiao Ma to teach her to play the drums. All of them have dinner together, with Xiao Ma becoming closer with both Tiemei and her ex-husband.

Since Tiemei is busy with work, Xiao Ye volunteers to babysit Moli, but does not abide by any of the rules set by Tiemei including bedtimes, screen time and diet. Xiao Ye begins a fling relationship with eye doctor Richard Hu. Meanwhile Moli at school is harassed by her classmate, Zhang Jiaxin. Xiao Ye begins to fill more of the responsibilities of a mother by picking Moli up from school and spending more time with her.

After a band practice Tiemei takes the band to dinner where they discuss menstrual cycles. Montages play of Tiemei's workaholic life as her publishing team debates whether or not to post an article about single mothers. Xiao Ma makes noodle dough with Tiemei and serves it at the next dinner where Tiemei's ex and Xiao Ye argue with him and spill things on him. The next day at school, Moli is asked to write about an unforgettable trip but cannot think of any as her mother was too busy working to take her travelling.

Xiao Ma installs a drumset in Tiemei's house as Xiao Ye pretends to be Moli's mom and takes her to Richard's clinic for an eye exam. Learning that she may be shortsighted, she continuously polices Moli and prevents her from using screens or reading books. Xiao Ma and Tiemei begin a sexual relationship. Xiao Ye encourages her to lie on her essay that she went to Paris, sparking an argument between Tiemei and Moli.

Inspired by Tiemei, Xiao Ye quits alcohol. When Richard finds Xiao Ye, Tiemei and Moli together at a museum, he assumes they are a lesbian couple. Jiaxin bullies Moli at school more. Tiemei's article is published but is quickly brigaded with hate comments. Xiao Ye and Tiemei meet Richard at a bar where Tiemei berates Xiao Ye for infidelity and announces they are breaking up. Later Tiemei kicks Xiao Ye out of her house.

The next day, Xiao Ma and Tiemei find Xiao Ye at her house unconscious (having taken sleeping pills). As they are taking Xiao Ye to the hospital she wakes up and falls, breaks her leg, then the two women reconcile. Tiemei is losing sleep reading the hate comments. At school Jiaxin has a change of heart and apologizes to Moli but tries to steal her drumsticks and injures himself in the process.

Moli's drum skills have progressed and she joins the band for a concert. Tiemei redefines her relationship with Xiao Ma. Moli experiences stage fright just before starting, but Tiemei and Xiao Ye encourage her. She plays the song successfully.

At school, Moli writes a new essay about her favorite thing - playing the drums. The film ends with Xiao Ye, Moli and Tiemei holding suitcases running down the train station and Moli quoting one of Tiemei's own articles in a conversation with her Mom.

== Cast ==
- Song Jia as Wang Tiemei: A clear-minded and independent "all-capable" single mother, she takes care of her child, builds her career, and manages everyday life. She was once an outstanding journalist but later gave up the profession she loved to become the editor-in-chief of a new media company, even taking on live-streaming sales. As an independent woman, Wang Tiemei believes she can excel in everything and strives to embody the traditional ideal of an exceptional woman.
- Zhong Chuxi as Xiao Ye: The band's lead singer, Xiao Ye, appears carefree on the surface but is deeply lacking in love. She is a hopeless romantic who is willing to give more than she receives in relationships. A bit detached and emotionally unsettled, she tends to be impulsive, highly emotional, and even prone to stress-induced reactions.
- Zeng Mumei as Wang Moli: A 9-year-old child who wrote "no longer fantasizing" in her essay, Tiemei's daughter, known as "Kid Sister." She may seem mild-mannered, but she has a strong sense of independence. She learns to play the drums but isn't fixated on performing on stage, nor is she interested in the typical "win an award and become an inspirational success story" path. She expresses the raw truth that the adult world has long masked with embellishments and pretense.
- Zhang Yu as Xiao Ma: Wang Moli's drum teacher engages in a "male rivalry" with Wang Tiemei's ex-husband in pursuit of her. He prides himself on knowing everything about Tiemei’s past reports, but behind his love, there is more than just pure affection.
- Mark Chao as Wang Tiemei's ex-husband : Wang Tiemei's ex-husband appears humorous, lovable, and optimistic on the surface, but deep down, he is delicate and sensitive. In an attempt to win Tiemei back, he diligently studies Chizuko Ueno's books, yet his words and actions often fail to align.
- Ren Bin as Xiao Hu: A doctor and the object of Xiao Ye's affection, he is drawn to the thrill of forbidden love. At first, he appears irresistibly charming, but eventually, his selfish nature is revealed. Even when Xiao Ye is tormented by love, he utters cringe-worthy lines like, "Loving me is enough."

== Production ==
On 18 March 2024, the film began shooting in Shanghai and on the same day, the concept poster of the film was released.

This film serves as a parallel piece of director Shao Yihui's 2021 directorial debut B for Busy, continuing its focus on themes of "centering women's perspectives and addressing women's struggles" while conveying the idea that "loving the world begins with loving oneself."

When asked by the media about similarities and differences between Her Story and B for Busy, director Shao Yihui explained that the "similarity lies in their lack of intense drama—both are refined from everyday life", and in Her Story "places greater emphasis on showcasing women's unique life experiences, distinct from those of men" and "aim to present how contemporary independent women live, find happiness, and derive a sense of meaning and value." Shao Yihui has emphasized at public appearances that she is not interested in provoking "gender antagonism".

On 25 October, the film released a playful teaser titled "Fun Story" and simultaneously unveiled a relationship poster series titled "So Close". On 29 October, "Her Story" was highlighted in Alibaba Pictures' latest film lineup for 2024. On November 1, a director's cut featurette called "Define by Yourself" was released, followed by the relationship featurette "Fully Matured Love" on November 5. A special video, "Bringing Joy", was released on 11 November, kicking off advance ticket sales and a limited second round of screenings in 64 cities from 16 to 17 November. As the release date approached, the final "Whatever" trailer was released on 18 November, along with the final "Live Your Best Life" poster. The "Pure Joy" special was released on 20 November. The film premiered in Beijing the same month and a promotional roadshow was held in Chengdu on the 19th. New posters were unveiled on 22 November.

== Themes ==
Her Story breaks away from the stereotypes of female film narratives by placing female agency at the center of its storytelling. The film portrays events from the "I" perspective of women, focusing on their points of view, needs, and desires. It presents women not only as participants, but as creators of new rules, moving away from oppressive contexts such as patriarchal family dynamics, domestic violence, the struggles of housewives, sexual assault, employment discrimination, and abuse. The narrative also explores the dynamics of strong women and vulnerable men, showing women taking the lead in shaping their lives and those around them. In addition, the film constructs a system of sexual meaning based on female consent, equality, participation, and pleasure.

Feminism is a tricky subject for Chinese media. However, the director, Shao Yihui is undeterred. “This film is one of the few that closely connects with trending topics among China’s internet-savvy and young audiences. It addresses issues like intimate relationships, menstrual stigma, women’s labor in families and consent in sexual behavior, raising a call to stop playing by their rules,” she said.

“Female audiences have become a quality demographic to which the Chinese film industry is now attempting to cater,” said Zhu Ying, author of Hollywood in China: behind the scenes of the world’s largest movie market. “This leads to more opportunities for female directors in a traditionally male-dominated industry … the recognition of female purchasing power gives women more voices on how their stories are told, which will have a long-lasting impact on the Chinese film industry.”

In Her Story, the portrayal of single motherhood departs from traditional depictions of struggle and courage. Instead of emphasizing the hardships of parenthood or the struggle against life's challenges, the film shows Wang Tiemei living life on her own terms and engaging in equal dialogue with her child. The narrative suggests that mothers and their children should not be bound by dependency, but should understand and support each other. It highlights that single mothers are not destined for a life of sorrow; they can pursue their own desires and professional ambitions.

Her Story showcased the diversity of contemporary women and promotes the re-evaluation of female roles. “The growing attention to female narratives reflects a shifting cultural landscape, with women’s stories and voices becoming increasingly prominent in the Chinese entertainment industry,” Tiger Pictures said.

Set in Shanghai, Her Story reflects the multicultural and inclusive nature of the city. Different cultures and lifestyles coexist harmoniously, with minimal interference in personal choices, unless you go online. Wang Tiemei, a 'Shanghai drifter', chooses to make the city her home despite a broken marriage. Her career as an investigative journalist faces many challenges, but she manages to find her place and seek new opportunities for growth.

Her Story not only portrays awakening women but also captures the evolving images of awakening men, revealing the complex minds of some men amidst the progress towards gender equality. These men are portrayed as wanting to break free from the traditional confines of gender roles, yet unable to fully escape the social pressures and identity issues that these roles bring.

== Marketing ==
The release of Her Story was accompanied by a citywide promotional campaign titled "Love Shanghai – Travel with the Movie," jointly organized by the Shanghai Municipal Administration of Culture and Tourism. The campaign integrated Shanghai's cultural and commercial spaces, with partnerships across local businesses, transportation branding, and audience engagement initiatives.

A Her Story city guide was distributed at select locations, featuring a map of filming sites, movie postcards, and promotional offers from partner businesses. A limited number of audience members also had the opportunity to win tickets to the upcoming Shanghai Biennale, provided by the Power Station of Art, one of the film's shooting locations.

Promotional activities included a pop up truck stationed at CITIC Square on Nanjing West Road on the film’s opening day. Several businesses offered perks to Her Story audiences who presented their ticket stubs. Lady Huaihai, TX Huaihai Youth Energy Center, and Huaihai 755 on Huaihai Road provided exclusive benefits, while Shanghai Jiushi Art Museum offered on-site ticket discounts. The campaign extended to public transportation, featuring themed buses and a limited-edition Shanghai public transportation card with Her Story branding.

Shanghai Film Co., Ltd., a subsidiary of the Shanghai Film Group, was involved in the film’s distribution. Its SFC EVENTS creative team coordinated promotional efforts under the guidance of the Shanghai Municipal Administration of Culture and Tourism. Approximately 200–300 copies of the Her Story booklet were distributed at various locations during the first weekend, with additional copies planned. Audience members could also use their regular movie tickets to redeem discounts at participating businesses.

At the Shanghai Film Studio 75th Anniversary Festival on November 23, Dai Yun, General Manager of Shanghai Film Co., Ltd., stated that Her Story had an opening day occupancy rate in Shanghai twice the national average.

== Release ==
The film was released both domestically and internationally on 22 November 2024, with debut in the United States and Canada on November 28, followed by the United Kingdom on 29 November. In Australia and New Zealand, it was distributed in theaters by Little Monster Entertainment on 28 November, with Singapore’s Golden Village releasing it on the same date. Malaysia’s Mega Films Distribution released the film on 8 December. In China, from release until 11 December, the film made $77 million in box office, overtaking Moana 2. In Douban, Her Story has a score of 92.2%, indicating positive and critical acclaim.

== Reception ==
=== Public ratings ===
On Douban, a popular Chinese media rating platform, "Her Story" initially garnered a high rating of 9.1. However, over time, this score has slightly decreased to 8.9. On Hupu, the response has been significantly more critical, with the film scoring only 4.7 out of 10. Users on this platform have expressed disappointment, particularly those expecting high-octane effects and thrilling plotlines typical of blockbuster films. The criticism extends to accusations of gender conflict and claims that the director deliberately objectified male characters, suggesting a stark contrast in audience expectations and reception.

=== Critical response ===
Weixing Huang from China Youth Daily stated that "Her Story carries a somewhat complex array of themes. It’s not a perfect film, but that doesn’t take away from its strength as an outstanding realist work that confronts women’s experiences and addresses issues such as gender relations and parenting. With a warm and unguarded tone, it speaks directly to the heart. As Wang Tiemei says in a press release at the end of the film: “It is precisely because we are optimistic and confident enough that we can face tragedy head-on.” Compared to other films in the same genre, Her Story adopts a more lighthearted and humorous narrative approach. It speaks frankly about uncomfortable realities, using a gentle portrayal of everyday life to deliver healing power and resonant meaning".

Internationally, on IMDB, Her Story holds a rating of 7.7 out of 10, indicating a generally favorable reception from a global audience. This score suggests that the film's artistic exploration and thematic depth have resonated well beyond its initial cultural context. Belle Wong from Singapore Film Society argued that "At its core, Her Story is a feminist film that presents female hardship with light-hearted optimism, making it more accessible in environments like China, where such themes are less openly discussed. By using comedy, the film is able to resonate with a wider audience, sparking meaningful discussions among both men and women of all ages. While films like Like a Rolling Stone (2024) explore female awakening, Her Story takes it a step further, offering a much-needed narrative on how women can navigate and challenge the world after their rebirth. With humour, depth, and heart, Her Story contends that the time has come to rewrite the rules of the game and embrace a new era of female empowerment."

The Chinese publication The Sixth Tone and British newspaper The Guardian called the film as China's answer to the 2023 Hollywood blockbuster Barbie. In an interview, Yang Xiaolin, director of the Film Research Institute at Tongji University, highlighted the film's popularity as stemming from its keen observation of everyday life, marking it as a fresh take on realist cinema. He noted that the film captures the essence of the present without exaggeration, focusing on the experiences of ordinary individuals, particularly the young and middle-aged "new Shanghainese". However, Yang also criticized the film for its intentional sidelining of male characters, arguing that it portrays a gendered narrative where women are depicted as victims of harm or discrimination in a male-dominated society, often intensifying the gender conflict by glorifying one side while vilifying the other. Fang Xiaoya of China Daily wrote that the film "created a narrative that speaks to women's experiences with honesty and warmth, inviting the audience to imagine a world where women can be the architects of their own futures."

=== Digital engagement ===
According to Maoyan Professional Edition, Her Story has dramatically outperformed contemporaneous films such as Gladiator 2 and Casanova in terms of digital engagement metrics. According to the latest data, the film leads in cumulative audience reach, TikTok discussion views, Weibo reads and Xiaohongshu post engagements.

By 2 December, Her Story had reached an astonishing 4.132 billion people, almost 20 times more than the other four films combined. On TikTok, topics related to the film have garnered over 1.56 billion views, far outpacing its peers. On Weibo, not only has it garnered more views, but it also tops the list of trending search topics. On Xiaohongshu, the film has generated considerable interest, with over 13 million posts tagged "Her Story Easter egg". These posts highlight the feminist references in the film, such as characters dressing up as famous feminist figures like Ruth Bader Ginsburg and Frida Kahlo, and using quotes from influential feminists like Chizuko Ueno and Gloria Steinem. This creative approach has inspired a passionate fan base to re-watch the film to catch all the nuanced details.

Wendy Huang of What's On Weibo wrote that "The success of Her Story, the conversations it inspires, and its contribution to highlighting female perspectives in film reflect the evolving dynamics of contemporary cinema and the strengthening of female voices in traditionally male-dominated industries."

=== Box office ===
Box office information
Presales/public release	Time (2024)	Box office (Unit: CNY)
Presales	As of November 17 at 14:05	Exceeded 10 million
Presales	As of November 20 at 21:37	Exceeded 30 million
Presales	As of November 30	Exceeded 670 million
Public Release	As of November 22 at 14:04	Exceeded 40 million
Public Release	As of November 22 at 19:28	Exceeded 50 million
Public Release	As of November 23 at 00:00	Exceeded 60 million
Public Release	As of November 23 at 12:31	Exceeded 70 million
Public Release	As of November 23 at 15:10	Exceeded 80 million
Public Release	As of November 23 at 17:52	Exceeded 90 million
Public Release	As of November 23 at 19:59	Exceeded 100 million
Public Release	As of November 26 at 20:52	Exceeded 200 million
Public Release	As of November 30 at 13:12	Exceeded 300 million
Public Release	As of December 2 at 18:16	Exceeded 400 million
Public Release	As of December 7 at 17:45	Exceeded 500 million
Public Release	As of December 14 at 13:18	Exceeded 600 million
Public Release	As of December 22	Exceeded 653 million
Public Release	As of December 25 at 18:59	Exceeded 700 million

== Accolades ==
Date	Award	Category	Recipient(s)	Result	Ref.
May 2024	2024 Weibo Awards	Most Anticipated Film by Netizens	Her Story	Nominated	
December 2024	40th Huading Awards	Best Global Screenplay	Shao Yihui	Nominated	
December 2024	5th New Era China Film Golden Flower Awards	Best New Era Director	Shao Yihui	Nominated	
December 2024	5th New Era China Film Golden Flower Awards	Best New Era Screenplay	Shao Yihui	Nominated	
December 2024	5th New Era China Film Golden Flower Awards	Best New Era Leading Actor	Song Jia	Nominated	
December 2024	5th New Era China Film Golden Flower Awards	Best New Era Performance Actor	Zeng Mumei	Nominated	
January 2025	17th 'Time Awards'	Best Ten Chinese-Language Films of the Year	Her Story	Won	
January 2025	17th 'Time Awards'	Best Ten New Film Forces in the Year	Shao Yihui	Won	
January 2025	17th 'Time Awards'	Best Ten Surprise Breakthroughs of the Year	Zhong Chuxi	Won	
January 2025	17th 'Time Awards'	Best Ten Screen Characters of the Year	Wang Tiemei	Won	
January 2025	China Movie Audience Research Survey	2024 Audience's Favorite Movie NO.1	Her Story	Won	
January 2025	The 5th Golden Elm Flower Award	Best Screenwriter	Shao Yihui	Won	
January 2025	2024 China TV Drama Awards	Best Director of the Year	Shao Yihui	Won	
January 2025	2024 China TV Drama Awards	Best Newcomer in the Year	Zeng Mumei	Won	
January 2025	31st Shanghai Film Critics Awards	Top Ten Films of the Year	Her Story	Won	
January 2025	31st Shanghai Film Critics Awards	Best Newcomer Work of the Year	Her Story	Won	
January 2025	31st Shanghai Film Critics Awards	Best New Actress of the Year	Zeng Mumei	Won	
November 2025	38th Golden Rooster Awards	Best Picture	Her Story	Won	
November 2025	38th Golden Rooster Awards	Best Director	Shao Yihui	Nominated	
November 2025	38th Golden Rooster Awards	Best Writing	Shao Yihui	Nominated	
November 2025	38th Golden Rooster Awards	Best Actress	Song Jia	Won	
November 2025	38th Golden Rooster Awards	Best Supporting Actor	Mark Chao	Nominated	
November 2025	38th Golden Rooster Awards	Best Supporting Actress	Zhong Chuxi	Won	
November 2025	38th Golden Rooster Awards	Best Sound Recording	Zhang Jinyan and Long Xiaozhu	Nominated	
