= Quartilla =

Fictional character in the Satyricon

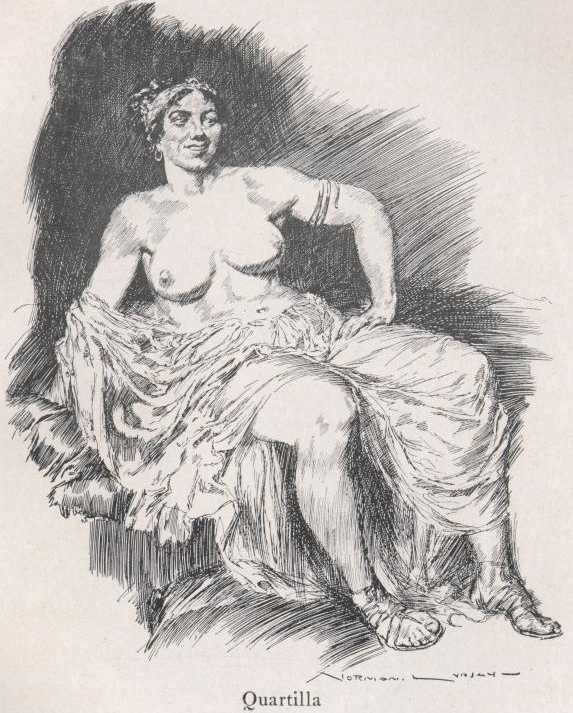
Portrait by Norman Lindsay (1909-22)

Quartilla is a character in the Satyricon which is said to be the "first picaresque" novel in Latin although it is not completely extant. This story was written by Petronius Arbiter in the first century. Quartilla is a follower of the god Priapus and she and her maids are involved with seducing and torturing three of the characters, Encolpius, Ascyltum, and Giton.

She has been the subject of artistic and academic study. It has been proposed that she represents Octavia and her name is a pun like reference for the reader.

== Bibliography ==
- Habash, Martha (2006). "Petronius' Satyrica 24.7: Quartilla's Asellus". Ancient Narrative. 5: 24–30.
