= The Bachelor (Chinese TV series) =

- Also known as: Bachelor
- Traditional Chinese: 大男當婚
- Simplified Chinese: 大男当婚
- Literal meaning: Old Men Should Marry
- Hanyu Pinyin: Dà Nán Dāng Hūn
- Written by: Rao Hui; Li Xiao; Liu Shen
- Directed by: Sun Hao; Zhang Xiaobo
- Starring: Xu Zheng; Mei Ting; Song Jia; Ma Su; Che Xiao; Zhang Xinyi
- Opening theme: "Zhao Ge Ren Lai Ai Wo" (找个人来爱我) performed by Li Jianheng
- Ending theme: "Jian Bu Duan de Sinian" (剪不断的思念) performed by Li Jianheng
- Composer: Liu Rui
- Country of origin: China
- Original language: Mandarin
- No. of episodes: 30

Production
- Executive producer: Zhang Weiwei
- Producer: Sui Lan
- Editor: Zhang Wenjun
- Running time: 45 minutes
- Production company: Yujia Shixing Pictures

Related
- Will You Marry Me and My Family (2010)

The Bachelor is a 2012 Chinese family television series produced by Yujia Shixing Pictures (御嘉世星影业).

The series stars Xu Zheng as a 35-year-old single man under parental pressure to get married, and detailed his romantic adventures. It is co-directed by Sun Hao, who in 2010 directed a similar series Will You Marry Me and My Family about an older woman looking for a mate. (The lead actress Song Jia also stars in The Bachelor, but as a different character.) Both series were co-written by Rao Hui, Li Xiao and Liu Shen.

The Bachelor was first broadcast on Shanghai Television in the Shanghai area on August 8, 2012, before being broadcast nationally on Anhui Television, Zhejiang Television, Shenzhen Television and various websites on October 7, 2012. In Taiwan, it was broadcast on EyeTV in 2014.

== Cast ==
- Xu Zheng as Cao Xiaoqiang, a 35-year-old sales manager. He treats every relationship very sincerely, and women he dated all love him.
- Zhu Yin as Cao Xiaoqiang's worrisome and overprotective mother.
- Wang Yang as Cao Xiaoqiang's father.
- Guo Jingfei as Huang Weiye, Cao Xiaoqiang's 33-year-old best friend.
- Wang Maolei as Li Wenda, Cao Xiaoqiang's 32-year-old lazy uncle.

The candidates:

- Mei Ting as Gu Qing, a 29-year-old Peking opera actress.
- Cao Yuan as Wu Xiaoliu, a 22-year-old French teacher.
- Sui Lan as Ma Xiaomei, a 25-year-old from the countryside, the daughter of a family friend.
- Ma Su as Cai Weilan, a 23-year-old recent college graduate.
- Che Xiao as Xu Ruoyun, a 31-year-old Harvard-educated vice-CEO.
- Song Jia as Zhao Kai, a 33-year-old urological surgeon.
- Zhang Xinyi as Liu Chenxi, a 33-year-old divorced single mom, Cao Xiaoqiang's college love.

== Ending ==
The drama ends with a woman's voice calling Cao Xiaoqiang's name and Cao turning his head. The identity of the voice generated much discussion in the Chinese cyber-world among fans, with people analyzing the voice of each actress that has appeared in the show. In December 2012, accepting the Favourite Male Character Award at the TV Drama Awards Made in China, Xu Zheng slyly told the crowd: "She is whomever you want her to be."

Director Sun Hao revealed that the voice was actually by actress Fan Bingbing, who happened to be paying the set a visit.

== Awards and nominations ==
2012 TV Drama Awards Made in China

- Won - Top 10 Dramas of the Year (#10)
- Won - Favourite Male Character, Cao Xiaoqiang (portrayed by Xu Zheng)
- Nominated - Best Actor, Xu Zheng

== See also ==
- Call for Love, 2007 romantic comedy film also starring Xu Zheng as the main role looking for a wife. Song Jia was one of the actresses in the film.
