= Wang Yinglu =

Chinese actress (born 2000)

- Born: August 19, 2000 (age 25); Sichuan, China
- Occupation: Actress
- Years active: 2020–present
- Agent: Mountain Top
- Height: 168 cm (5 ft 6 in)

Chinese name
- Simplified Chinese: 王影璐
- Hanyu Pinyin: Wáng Yǐnglù

Wang Yinglu (Chinese: 王影璐; pinyin: Wáng Yǐnglù, born August 19, 2000) is a Chinese actress. She gained recognition for her role as Feng Baobao in I Am Nobody (2023). She is also known for her roles in When Destiny Brings the Demon (2025) and Twelve Letters (2025).

== Discography ==
=== Soundtrack appearances ===
Year	Title	Album
2025	"Breaking Out of the Cocoon" (破茧)	I Am Nobody: The Showdown Between Yin & Yang OST
2025	"Feast Begins" (喜宴开)	Yummy Yummy Yummy OST

== Filmography ==
=== Films ===
Year	English Title	Chinese Title	Role	Ref.
2021	Crazy Tsunami	狂鳄海啸	Jiang Xiaohu	
2021	B for Busy	爱情神话	Yangyang	
2023	The Woman in the Storm	我经过风暴	Li Xiaomeng	
2023	Heart's Motive	最后的真相	Xiao Shanshan	
2024	I Love You, to the Moon and Back	穿过月亮的旅行	Prisoner's girlfriend	
2024	Welcome to My Side	欢迎来到我身边	Feng Jianan	
2024	The Wig	戴假发的人	Wei Xian	
2026	Love Go Go Go!	喜欢上"欠欠"的你	Jia Qiong	
2026	Panda Plan: The Magical Tribe	熊猫计划之部落奇遇	Sha Yi	
TBA	Take Her Name	狮子回头	Zhang Shasha	

=== Television series ===
Year	English Title	Chinese Title	Role	Notes	Ref.
2020	Four Years of Life	四年一生	Gu Wei		
2020	Dear Missy	了不起的女孩	Teen Shen Siyi		
2022	The Heart of Genius	天才基本法	Celebrity	Cameo	
2023	I Am Nobody	异人之下	Feng Baobao		
2024	Pegasus	飞驰人生热爱篇	Ai Fei	Support role	
2025	I Am Nobody: The Showdown Between Yin & Yang	异人之下之决战! 碧游村	Feng Baobao		
2025	When Destiny Brings the Demon	献鱼	Liao Tingyan		
2025	Created in China	淬火年代	Yu Shanshan	Support role	
2025	Twelve Letters	十二封信	Ye Haitang		
2025	Yummy Yummy Yummy	宴遇永安	Shen Shaoguang		
2026	Xiao Fang	小芳	Yang Xiaofang		
TBA	The Lotus Secret	无邪	Liu Huasheng		
TBA	Undercover Auto Genius	隐擎	Ye Ling		
TBA	Players	玩家	Glasses girl	Cameo	

== Awards and nominations ==
Year	Award	Category	Nominee(s)/Work(s)	Result
2022	China Film Big Data & Movie Channel M Awards	Most Popular Newcomer	B for Busy	Nominated
2023	The 4th New Era International Film Festival	Most Challenging Actress of the New Era	The Woman in the Storm	Nominated
2024	China Film Big Data & Movie Channel M Awards	New Actor of the Year	The Woman in the Storm Heart's Motive	Won
2024	Weibo Movie Night Awards	Annual Progressive Actress	—N/a	Won
2024	Douyin Movie Wonder Night	Most Watched Actor of the Year	—N/a	Won
2024	Weibo TV & Internet Video Summit	Breakthrough Actor of the Year	—N/a	Won
2025	5th New Era International Film Festival	Most Popular Actress of the New Era	I Am Nobody: The Showdown Between Yin & Yang	Nominated
2025	Tencent Video Star Awards	Progressive Artist of the Year	—N/a	Won
2026	Weibo Night	Most Anticipated Actor of the Year	—N/a	Won
