= Pieter Burman the Elder =

Dutch classical scholar (1668–1741)

Pieter Burman
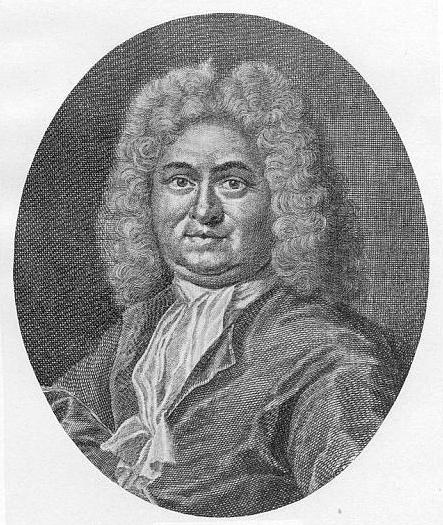
- Born: 1668
- Died: 1741 (aged 72–73)

Academic background
- Education: Utrecht University

Academic work
- Discipline: Classics
- Institutions: Utrecht University

Pieter Burman (6 July 1668 – 31 March 1741), also known as Peter or Pieter Burmann (Latin: Petrus Burmannus) and posthumously distinguished from his nephew as "the Elder" (Latin: Senior), was a Dutch classical scholar.

== Life ==
Burman was born at Utrecht on 6 July 1668, the son of Franz Burmann (Franciscus Burmannus; 1628–1679) and Maria, daughter of Abraham Heidanus. His father was the son of a Protestant minister who had been driven from France; he officiated as professor of theology at Utrecht, and became known by his writings, especially by his commentaries on the Old Testament. At the age of thirteen Pieter entered the university where he studied under Graevius and Gronovius. He devoted himself particularly to the study of the classical languages, and became unusually proficient in Latin composition. As he was intended for the legal profession, he spent some years in attendance on the law classes. For about a year he studied at Leiden, paying special attention to philosophy and Greek.

On Burman's return to Utrecht he took the degree of doctor of laws (March 1688), and after travelling through Switzerland and part of Germany, settled down to the practice of law, without, however, abandoning his classical studies. In December 1691 he was appointed receiver of the tithes which were originally paid to the bishop of Utrecht, and five years later was nominated to the professorship of eloquence and history. To this chair was soon added that of Greek and politics. In 1714 he paid a short visit to Paris and ransacked the libraries. In the following year he was appointed successor to the celebrated Perizonius, who had held the chair of history, Greek language and eloquence at Leiden.

Burman was subsequently appointed professor of history for the United Provinces and in 1724 he became the 9th Librarian of Leiden University. His numerous editorial and critical works spread his fame as a scholar throughout Europe, and engaged him in many of the stormy disputes which were then so common among men of letters.

== Works ==
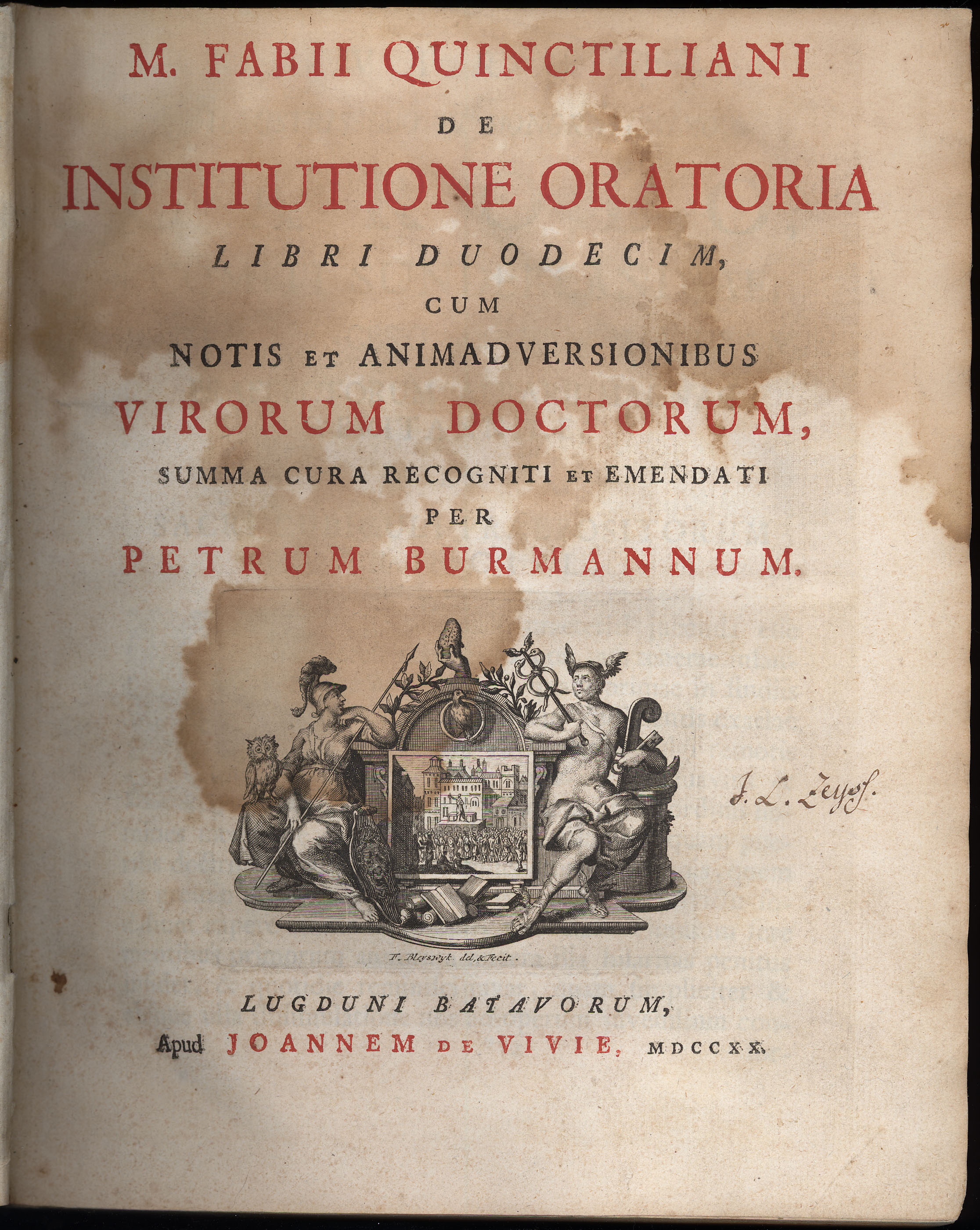
Title page of Burman's Quintilian edition (Leiden 1720)

Burman published Latin editions of Phaedrus (1698), Horace (1699), Valerius Flaccus (1702), Petronius (1709), Menander and Philemon (1710), Ovid (1713 & 1727), Velleius Paterculus (1719), Quintilian (1720), Justin the Historian (1722), various minor Latin poets (1731), Suetonius (1736), and Lucan (1740) He died while editing the work of Vergil, an edition that was completed by his nephew.

Burman also emended Thomas Ruddiman's edition of George Buchanan's Latin works, continued Graevius's Thesauruses of Italian and Sicilian history, and wrote the treatise De Vectigalibus Populi Romani (1694) and A Brief Description of Roman Antiquities (1711). His Sylloge of Letters Written by Illustrious Men (1725–27) contains biographical material on scholars. He edited several other volumes of letters as well.

The list of Burman's works occupies five pages in Saxe's Onomasticon. His Latin poems and orations were republished after his death. There is an account of his life in the Gentleman's Magazine for April 1742 by Samuel Johnson.

== Legacy ==
In his edition of Petronius's Satyricon, Burman demonstrated that the supplementary material recently added to the text by François Nodot was in fact a forgery.
