= Myth of Love =

Chinese name
- Traditional Chinese: 愛情神話
- Simplified Chinese: 爱情神话
- Hanyu Pinyin: Àiqíng shénhuà
- Wugniu: ^{5}e-zhin ^{6}zen-gho
- Directed by: Shao Yihui
- Written by: Shao Yihui
- Produced by: Xu Zheng
- Release date: December 24, 2021
- Running time: 112 minutes
- Country: China
- Languages: Shanghainese; Mandarin

Myth of Love (Chinese: 爱情神话), also released as B for Busy, is a 2021 Chinese romantic comedy drama film, written and directed by Shao Yihui, produced by Xu Zheng, and starring Xu Zheng, Ma Yili, Wu Yue, Ni Hongjie, and Zhou Yemang.

The film was released in China on December 24, 2021. It attracted local attention because of its subject matter, a romantic comedy with middle aged adults as protagonists, and because of its rarity as a contemporary Shanghainese-language film.

== Plot ==
The film tells the story of three women in Shanghai, Miss Li (played by Ma Yili), Beibei (played by Wu Yue), Gloria (played by Ni Hongjie) and their relationship with Lao Bai (played by Xu Zheng).

Lao [Ol'] Bai is a divorced artist living in a French Concession shikumen with his neighbor Lao Wu, a former womanizer who claims to have even had an affair with Sophia Loren, and Alexander, a young Italian who rents from Bai but is late on rent. He passes his days as an amateur art teacher for the neighborhood elders, which Wu criticizes as squandering his potential on glorified daycare and implores him to host an exhibition in a real gallery. One of his students, the vivacious and flirtatious Gloria, makes advances on Bai despite his lack of interest. He has a date and a one night stand with Li, an advertising director, who hastily leaves despite Bai's desire for a deeper connection. However, a poem he posts inspired by the date gets her attention, and he heads over to her home for another meeting. He meets her mother and her daughter Maya, who she had with her British ex-husband. Bai starts picking her up from school and tutoring her as she fails her English classes despite expectations that she wold perform well due to her heritage.

Meanwhile, Bai tries to navigate his relationships with his cold ex-wife Beibei, whom his mother keeps trying to reunite him with despite her infidelity, and his son Bai Ge, a gay man who Beibei forces on dates with women that Bai helps him escape, although he doesn't fully accept his son's untraditional masculinity. Bai tries to arrange a meeting with Li at his house, but it nearly falls apart when Gloria makes a surprise visit due to the alleged kidnapping of her estranged Taiwanese husband in Turkey for ransom. Further chaos erupts when Beibei, Lao Wu and Alexander also pop in. However, despite their differences, Li, Gloria and Beibei get along and the gathering becomes a raging party instead. Bai wakes up to a messy house, Gloria's insinuation that he slept with her, and Li's broken Jimmy Choo high heels.

When hosting Li and Maya later, he makes an offer to repair the shoes and let them move in. Li responds with reluctance, and says that they were simply knockoffs. However, when he goes to the cobbler, he says they are real, and Bai realizes that he had been moving too fast and made Li feel pressured. Bai and Wu have a falling out over their growing differences, but ultimately reconcile with Wu organizing Bai's exhibition space. Everyone gets together for another party, where they see an article about Loren's death. This prompts Wu to finally narrate the story about how Loren met him as a college student in Italy during the filming of Fellini Satyricon (which is also titled 爱情神话 in Chinese), but then concludes by saying that he made it all up. They find him dead the next morning, and hold his funeral; ironically; the article about Loren's death turns out to be fake news. Bai hosts the exhibition in his honor, where a representative of an anonymous benefactor hands over some goods they had bought for him but reveals that his house was paid by the benefactor. Bai hosts everyone to see Fellini Satyricon. Although they ultimately find the movie boring, it allows everyone to bond. Li decides to continue her relationship with Bai, who himself starts to understand his son better on seeing how others accept him.

== Cast ==
- Xu Zheng as Lao Bai
- Ma Yili as Miss Li
- Wu Yue as Beibei
- Ni Hongjie as Gloria
- Zhou Yemang as Lao Wu (Lao Bai's friend)
- Huang Minghao as Bai Ge
- Wang Yinglu as Yang Yang
- Ning Li as Xiao Pijiang

== Reception ==
The film was praised for its unique story and characterization, depiction of Shanghai life and culture, and its subversion of gender stereotypes.
