= Supplements to the Satyricon =

Extensions to a work by Petronius

Petronius's Satyricon, the only extant realistic Classical Latin novel (probably written c. AD 60), survives in a very fragmentary form. Many readers have wondered how the story would begin and end.

Between 1629 and the present several authors in various languages have attempted to round the story out. In certain cases, following a well-known conceit of historical fiction, these invented supplements have been claimed to derive from newly discovered manuscripts.

== José Antonio González de Salas, 1629 ==
José Antonio González de Salas (born 1588, died 1654) published an edition of the Satyricon in 1629; it was reissued in 1643 with a portrait. It included linking passages (in Latin) which de Salas claimed to have taken from an earlier Paris edition, but this does not exist. It is assumed that he invented them. The only English translation that includes these passages is by W. C. Firebaugh in The Satyricon of Petronius Arbiter (1922).

== François Nodot, 1693 ==
In October, 1690, François Nodot, a French writer and mercenary soldier, announced a remarkable discovery to the French academies. A certain du Pin, a French officer, had been present at the sack of Belgrade in 1688 and came across a manuscript, a copy of which he had sent to Nodot. It proved to contain supplements to the known text of the Satyricon.

Nodot's claims were initially accepted, and the supplements were thought to be genuine. They were published as such in 1693, but soon gave rise to suspicion. They were conclusively shown to be spurious by Pieter Burmann the Elder (whose Latin edition of Petronius appeared in 1709), yet they were sometimes printed in editions of the real fragments down to the early 20th century.

The Nodot additions were translated into English by William Burnaby in 1694, into French by Héguin de Guerle, and into various other languages. Translations incorporating Nodot's supplements continued to appear in print until the early 20th century. They are currently included (in English) in at least three online versions of the Satyricon.

== José Marchena, 1800 ==
José Marchena Ruiz de Cueto, a Spaniard, was at Basel in 1800, attached to the staff of the French general Moreau. In his spare time he wrote scholarly notes on ancient sexuality, and eventually constructed a supplement to Petronius which illustrated his researches. He translated the fragment into French, attached the notes, and published the book as Fragmentum Petronii (Paris? 1800), claiming that the fragment was by Petronius and the translation and notes were by a certain Doctor of Theology named "Lallemand".

In Marchena's preface, dedicated to the Napoleonic Army of the Rhine, he states that he found the fragment in a manuscript of the work of Saint Gennadios on the Duties of Priests; close examination had revealed that it was a palimpsest and that this fragment formed the underlying text.

According to Stephen Gaselee "in every line it has exactly the Petronian turn of phrase."

An English translation of both text and notes is included in Firebaugh's 1922 translation, The Satyricon of Petronius Arbiter. The Latin text of the fragment, very rare in its original edition, is included in W.K. Kelly's 1854 translation of the Satyricon.

== H.C. Schnur, 1968 ==
H.C. Schnur's German translation of the Satyricon, published in 1968, includes an original supplement to the story written by the translator.

== Andrew Dalby, 2005 ==
In 2005, Andrew Dalby published an epilogue to the Satyricon, a narrative of a dinner party set at Massilia twenty years after the dramatic date of the surviving text.

== See also ==
- Petronius
- Satyricon

== Bibliography ==
- McElroy, Hugh (2000–2001). "The reception and use of Petronius: Petronian pseudepigraphy and imitation". Ancient Narrative. Vol. 1. pp. 350 ff. Archived from the original on 2007-03-12.
