= Will You Marry Me and My Family =

- Also known as: My Eldest Girl Should Get Married
- Traditional Chinese: 大女當嫁
- Simplified Chinese: 大女当嫁
- Hanyu Pinyin: Dà Nǚ dāng jià
- Genre: Romantic comedy, urban drama
- Written by: Rao Hui, Liu Shen, Li Xiao
- Directed by: Sun Hao
- Starring: Song Jia; Yu Xiaowei; Guo Tao; Zhang Haotian; Liu Dekai; Zhou Jie; Sun Yifei
- Opening theme: “Don’t want to get old alone” 《不想一个人老去》sung by Liu Xin (刘沁)
- Ending theme: ”Finding someone to love me”《找个人来爱我》sung by Xiao Ling (萧翎)
- Composer: Liu Yue
- Country of origin: China
- Original language: Mandarin
- No. of episodes: 25

Production
- Producers: Wang Li; He Jichang; Chen Wei; Liu Yinghua; Hu Huimin; Huang Songbao; Cui Qing
- Production location: Beijing
- Cinematography: Jiang Xiaobo
- Editor: Zhang Wenjun
- Running time: 45 minutes per episode

Original release
- Network: CCTV
- Release: April 3, 2010

Related
- The Bachelor (2012)

Will You Marry Me and My Family is a 2010 Chinese urban comedy/drama television series directed by Sun Hao, starring Song Jia. It premiered on CCTV-8 on April 3, 2010 and comprises 25 episodes.

The series concerns a career woman (Song) in her thirties whose family is frantically searching for a prospective spouse for her. The series portrays the phenomenon of sheng nu (剩女, lit. “leftover women”), which refers to a phenomenon in East Asian societies where urban women are getting married at a much older age, some of whom continue into singlehood throughout their lives.

== Plot ==
Eldest child Jiang Dayan (Song Jia), 33, is a schoolteacher living in a middle-income family with her doting 80-year-old grandmother, her father – a retired school principal – and forensic pathologist mother. Ever since her younger sister and brother marry, she is pressured to get herself married since, at 33, is now considered a sheng nu (剩女) by Chinese standards. Immediately after her sister's wedding, the Jiang family makes getting their eldest girl hitched their No. 1 priority and pulls out all the stops to match Dayan with any eligible bachelor in town. Despite having a group of spinster schoolmates who face similar problems, Dayan gives in to her parents’ wishes and go for countless (unsuccessful) matchmaking sessions, even appearing on a TV matchmaking program. Her grandmother gives her a one-year ultimatum to get married, even though Dayan feels personally it is impossible to rush romance or marriage.

After encountering many unsuitable guys and a “contract marriage” proposal, Dayan settles on her first serious relationship in years. Banking manager Peng Tan (Zhou Jie) is polite, well-spoken and good-looking, a doctorate from a US university who is three years Dayan's senior, a colleague of Dayan's sister-in-law. Although Dayan is attracted to him at first she realizes as their relationship progresses that she has difficulty coping with his extremely fastidious and demanding mum, and that the ultra-rational Peng Tan is really after a marriage, not love. The two break up after Dayan discover Peng had hired a hooligan to beat up a fellow suitor of hers.

A problem student's father, popular on-air host Su Rushi (Liu Dekai), ushers in her second romance. The charismatic, mature radio presenter is well known in the city, but is almost 60. While Dayan's family objects to this May–December romance, Dayan and Su are ready to disregard family dissent and pursue love. But the appearance of Su's former wife and the emigration of his daughter to Canada cause the two to break up.

As Dayan nurses heartbreak, a third man appears in her life. Energetic young teacher Zhang Yaoyang (Zhang Haotian) is twelve years Dayan's junior and was a former trainee teacher. Dayan is attracted to his youthfulness but finds it difficult to keep up with his verve or his at times not-so-mature ways. After a protracted break-up, where Zhang ends up causing the injury of another teacher, new Vice-Principal Cheng Chuang (Yu Xiaowei), Zhang whites out from her life.

Cheng Chuang, the responsible, independent vice-principal from Dayan's school, a former soldier, is four years Dayan's senior and is a perfect candidate from the Jiang's family's point of view. Dayan finds herself with increasing feeling for Cheng, especially after her grandmother's unexpected death, until a coquettish best friend (Fan Jinlin) professes her interest in the man. Add to the fact that she is unsure how Cheng feels about herself, the romance stalls. A false diagnosis of cervical cancer convinces Dayan Cheng is the right one for her. But will he be the man who will end her singlehood?

== Main cast (simplified Chinese) ==
- Song Jia (宋佳) as Jiang Dayan (姜大雁), a schoolteacher who is 33/35 throughout the series. She is the protagonist, a bespectacled, unostentatious woman who undergoes four serious relationships in the series. Like any woman she has her emotional weakness and is under enormous stress in getting herself hitched, but gets by with an attitude ready to laugh at herself.
- Zhou Jie (周杰) as Peng Tan (彭坦), a 36-year-old banking manager who appears polite and well spoken. His extremely fastidious mother and maternal aunts prove the downfall of his relationship with Dayan.
- Liu Dekai (刘德凯) as Su Rushi (苏如是), a charismatic radio presenter in his late 50s. He has a daughter in her late teens and is a divorcee.
- Zhang Haotian (张浩天) as Zhang Yaoyang (张耀阳), a boyish 22-year-old who is first a trainee teacher then a formal photography teacher at Dayan's school. He is interested in Dayan and makes no qualms about declaring his romantic interest in her.
- Yu Xiaowei (于小伟) as Cheng Chuang (程闯), a 38-year-old vice-principal and teacher newly posted to Dayan's school. He is a responsible, independent and caring teacher who knew Dayan formerly and is a former soldier.
- Chu Shuanzhong (储栓忠) as Dazhi (大志), a down-to-earth, honest, blue-collar taxi driver interested in Dayan. Dayan treats him as a good friend.
- Guo Tao (郭涛) as Fang Quan (方泉), a suitor who offers Dayan a “contract marriage”.
- Ma Shuliang (马书良) as Jiang Haoran (姜浩然), the father, head of the Jiang family, a retired school principal. Like his wife, his most urgent wish is to get his eldest girl married.
- Zhu Yin (朱茵) as Dang Sheng (党生), the mother, a forensic pathologist who tries all means, both legal and foul, to get her eldest child hitched.
- Lu Yuan (鲁园) as Grandma/Gao Jinwen (奶奶/高锦雯), the impish 80-year-old grandmother who has a sweet tooth and a soft spot for Häagen-Dazs ice cream. Dayan is her favorite grandchild.
- Sun Yifei (孙镱菲) as Jiang Xiaoyun (姜小芸), Dayan's younger sister, who is/was married and acts as her some-time love counsel.
- Guo Lin (郭林) as Hao Tong (郝童), Xiaoyun's miserly and rotund restaurant owner husband.
- Zhang Duo (张铎) as Jiang Xiaojun (姜小军), Dayan's younger brother, a traffic policeman who is married to Qian Lele.
- He Haoyang (何昊阳) as Qian Lele (钱乐乐), Dayan's sister-in-law, wife to Jiang Xiaojun.
- Fan Jinlin (樊锦霖) as Lü Wei (吕薇), Dayan's extremely coquettish good friend, who believes in using her assets to hook the best available bachelor. She undergoes extensive plastic surgeries to achieve this end.

== Reception ==
The series was marketed as a TV series with similar themes to Feng Xiaogang’s 2008 film If You Are the One. The debut on CCTV-8 was a successful one – Will You Marry Me and My Family was one of the most popular Chinese series in 2010. The series provoked a debate on the phenomenon of sheng nu on the Internet. Liu Xin and Xiao Ling’s songs for the series also became popular hits online. Lead actress Song Jia has professed her dislike for the phrase sheng nu, which she considers derogatory, preferring the newly coined and more neutral dǎnǚ.
