= Back to the Wharf =

- Film poster
- Simplified Chinese: 风平浪静
- Traditional Chinese: 風平浪靜
- Literal meaning: Peaceful wind, still waves (an idiom meaning a scenario that is calm)
- Hanyu Pinyin: Fēngpíng làngjìng
- Directed by: Li Xiaofeng (李霄峰)
- Written by: Yu Xin (余欣)
- Produced by: Huang Bo
- Starring: Zhang Yu; Lee Hong-chi; Song Jia
- Cinematography: Piao Songri (朴松日)
- Production companies: Tianjin Turan Film Co., Ltd. (天津突燃影业有限公司); Shanghai Dashui Cultural Development Co., Ltd. (上海大水文化发展有限公司)
- Release date: 6 November 2020 (China)
- Running time: 119 minutes
- Country: China
- Language: Mandarin

Back to the Wharf (Chinese: 风平浪静) is a 2020 Chinese crime film directed by Li Xiaofeng (李霄峰). This was the third major film created by this director.

Brandon Yu of The New York Times described it as "an allegory about China’s head-spinning modernization." The Houston Chronicle described the film as "Chinese noir".

== Plot ==
The initial portion of the film takes place circa 1992. Song Hao had committed homicide with his father when he was a teenager. Song Hao leaves town and works in Guangzhou.

The bulk of the film takes place in 2007. Song Hao deals with his past after his mother's death as Song Hao comes back to where he grew up. Song Hao also becomes re-acquainted with his friend Li Tang, who became politically powerful in the town; Li Tang had taken a direct admission to university placement because the principal of Li Tang's secondary school sought to get political gain from Li Tang's father, who is the mayor. That spot had been supposed to go to Song Hao. Li Tang, now in a privileged position, is trying to force Wan Xiaoning, the daughter of Song Hao's victim, out of her nail house. Meanwhile, Song Hao's childhood schoolmate, Pan Xiaoshuang, pursues him romantically and the two marry.

Li Tang reminds Song Hao that he knows about Song Hao's crime as he murders Xiaoning by hitting her with the car; he orders Song Hao to bury the body. Song Hao's father tells the man, now with a wife and child, that he needs to endure, but Song Hao breaks down and fatally injures himself. The crimes of the other parties are exposed.

== Cast ==
- Zhang Yu - Song Hao (宋浩) (adult)
- Lee Hong-chi - Li Tang (李唐) (adult)
- Song Jia - Pan Xiaoshuang (潘晓霜)
- Deng Enxi - Wan Xiaoning (万小宁)
- Wang Yanhui - Song Jianfei (宋建飞)
- Chen Jin (陈瑾) - Song Hao's mother
- Zhou Zhengjie (周政杰) - Young Song Hao
- Gao Yuhang (高宇航) - Young Li Tang
- Zhang Jianya - Mr. Zhang, the school principal/headmaster (张校长; 'Principal Zhang')

== Reception ==
Yu praised the acting and the romantic portions as well as the "striking cinematography", while he criticized the "dissonance" that resulted from a conflict between the "rough-edged execution" and the "self-serious attitude".

Wendy Ide of Screen Daily wrote that the film had a "striking visual impact".

Richard Kuipers of Variety wrote that the work is "technically excellent" and "Well paced and moodily shot".

== See also ==
- List of Chinese films of 2020
