= Habinnas =

"Satyricon" character

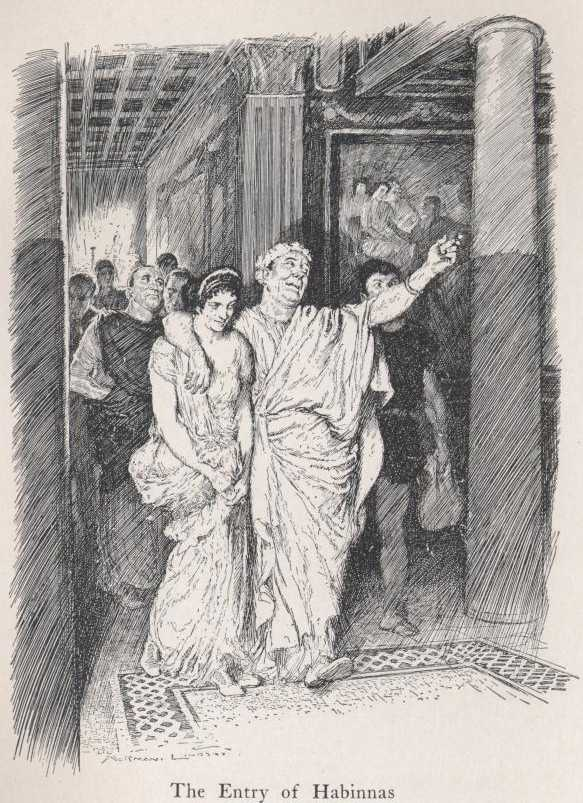
Habinnas and Scintilla, by Norman Lindsay (1922)

Habinnas is one of the guests at Trimalchio's Feast (Cena Trimalchionis) in the Satyricon of Petronius Arbiter. He is described as a stonemason, who has designed the luxurious tomb that Trimalchio shows off to his guests, and like Trimalchio he is a sevir. It has been suggested that the name is Semitic. His entry into the feast has been seen as a parody of that of Alcibiades in the Symposium of Plato.
