= Song Jia (actress, born 1980) =

Chinese actress and singer

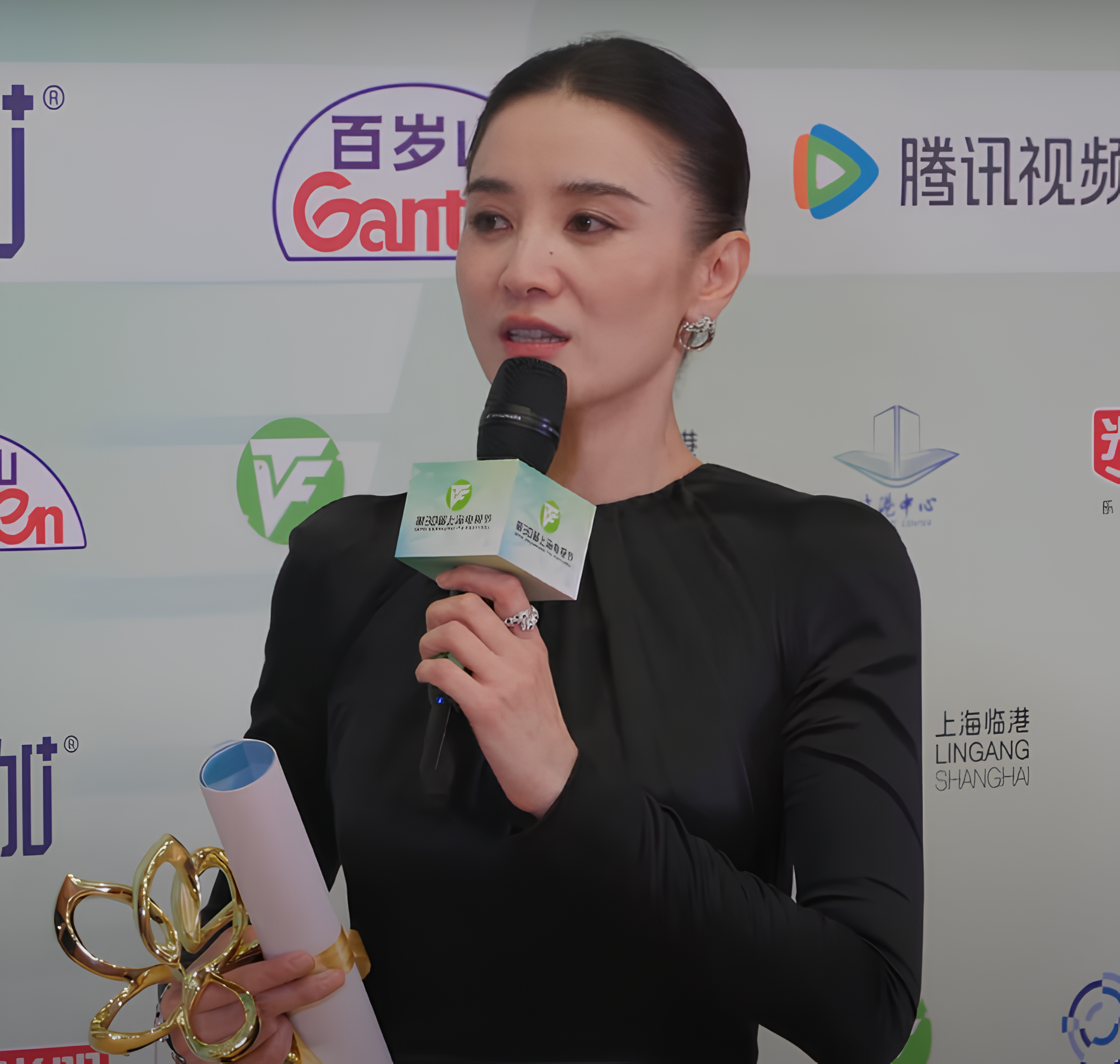
- Song at the 2025 Shanghai Television Festival
- Born: 13 November 1980 (age 45); Harbin, Heilongjiang, China
- Other name: Song Jia the younger
- Education: Shanghai Theater Academy
- Occupations: Actress; singer
- Years active: 2004–present
- Agent(s): Orange Sky Entertainment Group; Easy Entertainment (present)

Chinese name
- Chinese: 宋佳
Transcriptions
Standard Mandarin
- Hanyu Pinyin: Sòng Jiā

Song Jia (Chinese: 宋佳, born 13 November 1980) is a Chinese actress and singer. Early in her career, she was sometimes known as "Song Jia the younger" (小宋佳) to distinguish her from another older actress of the same name. In 2026, she became the first Chinese actress to win the "Grand Slam" for a single role, after winning "Best Actress" trophy at the three biggest Chinese television awards including the Feitian Award, the Golden Eagle Award, and the Magnolia Award for her performance in television series She and Her Girls (2025).

== Career ==
Song studied at the secondary school affiliated with the Shenyang Conservatory of Music (SYCM), and at Shanghai Theater Academy where she majored in acting.

Song rose to fame for her performance in Curiosity Kills the Cat (2006) as a manicure girl with a clear-cut stand on what to love and what to hate. She was nominated for a Golden Rooster Award for Best Supporting Actress.

Song has portrayed diverse characters, winning her acclaim as a versatile actress. She played the role of Zheng Yunan in the television series Memoirs of China (2008) and a native Tibetan girl in the film Once Upon a Time in Tibet (2010). In both roles, she spoke a new language with fluency: English and Tibetan. These two different characters are an example of her acting style.

In The Brink (2012), Song played the lead female character Gu Qiuyan. Within the limited story structure, Song revealed a multifaceted character and a complex psychological world, and received both the Magnolia Award for Best Actress and Golden Eagle Awards for Best Performing Arts Actress.

In Falling Flowers (2013), Song depicted the legendary life of renowned Chinese writer Xiao Hong, and won the Golden Rooster Award for Best Actress, the Chinese American Film Festival Gold Angel Award for Best Actress and other awards. This film also won the Golden Goblet Award for Best Cinematography at the Shanghai International Film Festival.

For the martial arts film The Final Master (2015), Song won Best Actress awards from the inaugural Gold Aries Award by the Macau International Film Festival and the Huading Awards for her performance as a sharp-tongued waitress in a fancy Western-themed restaurant, shamed in the community because she gave birth to a son who was not fully Chinese.

In 2017, Song served on the jury for the Shanghai Television Festival.

In 2021, Song was the jury for the main competition of feature films at the 24th Shanghai International Film Festival.

== Other activities ==
Song was appointed the UNEP 10YFP and SWITCH-Asia Ambassador, joining in international efforts to achieve Sustainable Consumption and Production in China.

== Filmography ==
=== Film ===
Year	English title	Chinese title	Role	Notes	Ref.
2003	Double Dating	非常浪漫	Shan Shan		
2003	Midnight Ghosts	午夜惊魂	Chen Lei		
2004	The Game of Killing	天黑请闭眼	Li Jia		
2006	Talking About Love	谈谈心恋恋爱	Lin Qiao'er		
2006	Curiosity Kills the Cat	好奇害死猫	Sharon Liang		
2006	Big Movie	大电影之数百亿	Zhi Xian	Cameo	
2007	Call for Love	爱情呼叫转移	Luo Yanyan		
2007	Help	救我	Yan Jiang		
2008	Red Cliff	赤壁上	Li Ji		
2008	Desires of the Heart	桃花运	Lin Cong		
2009	On His Majesty's Secret Service	大内密探灵灵狗	Princess Rainbow		
2010	Bruce Lee, My Brother	李小龙我的兄弟	Yu Qinqiu	Cameo	
2011	Once Upon a Time in Tibet	西藏往事	Yong Cuo		
2011	Energy Behind the Heart	用心跳		Cameo	
2011	Cold Steel	遍地狼烟	Liu Yan		
2012	Passion Island	热爱岛	Fan Li		
2013	Falling Flowers	萧红	Xiao Hong		
2015	The Final Master	师父	Zhao Guohui		
2016	The Bodyguard	我的特工爷爷	Chun Hua	Cameo	
2016	When Larry Met Mary	陆垚知马俐	Mary		
2016	Cherry Returns	那年夏天你去了哪里	Yuan Ningjing		
2017	Shock Wave	拆弹专家	Carmen		
2017	The Founding of an Army	建军大业	Soong Ching-ling		
2017	The Conformist	冰之下	Bing Bing		
2018	Fat Buddies	胖子行动队		Cameo	
2018	The Poet	诗人	Chen Hui		
2019	The Shadow Play	风中有朵雨做的云	Lin Hui		
2019	The Game of Desire	欲念游戏	Baby's Mother	Cameo	
2019	Super Me	超级的我	Hua'er		
2019	My People, My Country	我和我的祖国	Lü Xiaoran	Segment: "One for All"	
2019	The Guilty Ones	你是凶手	Bai Lan		
2020	Back to the Wharf	风平浪静	Pan Xiaoshuang		
2021	Tiger Robbers	阳光劫匪	Xiao Xue		
2021	1921	1921	Gao Junman		
2021	Chinese Doctors	中国医生	Huang Jiahui		
2021	The Eleventh Chapter	第十一回	Zhen Manyu		
2021	My Country, My Parents	我和我的父辈	Han Jingya	Anthology film	
2021	Words After Dark	夜晚的语言	Liu Shiran		
2022	Ode to the Spring	你是我的春天	Wang Ya'er		
2024	Strangers When We Meet	朝云暮雨	Dating Lady	Cameo	
2024	Enjoy yourself	祝你幸福	Bai Hui		
2024	Her Story	好东西	Wang Tiemei		
2025	Fish Flew Away	轻于鸿毛	Li Yu		
2025	The Volunteers: Peace at Last	志愿军：浴血和平	Lin Yueming		
2025	Family At Large	三滴血	Diao Er		
2026	Scare Out	惊蛰无声	Zhao Hong		
2026	The Embers	我们仅有一次的人生	Huang Yan		
TBA	The Weary Poet	诗眼倦天涯	Wen Sanchun		
TBA	Broken Formation	破阵子			

=== Television series ===
Year	English title	Chinese title	Role	Notes/Ref.
2001		其实不想走	Qin Peipei	
2002		越活越精彩	Liu Yu	
2003	Unexpected	出乎意料	Rong Shanshan	
2004		出水芙蓉	Fang Xiaoxuan	
2004		逆水寒	Wan Qing	
2005	Sigh of His Highness	一生为奴	Empress Dowager Ci'an	
2006	The War for Love	真情无限之继母	Lan Lan	
2007		故乡的云	Liang Siyun	
2008	The Last Battle	最后的较量	Lin Chacha	
2008	Memoirs of China	中国往事	Zheng Yunan	
2009	Red Sun	红日	Li Qing	
2009		闯关东	Tan Xiang'er	
2009	Love with My Former Wife	跟我的前妻谈恋爱	Yu Xiaohong	
2009	Look at Flower in Fog	雾里看花	Huang Yijiang	
2010	Red Cradle	红色摇篮	Gou Wencao	Cameo
2010		天地民心	Princess Hedai	
2010	White Wolf	白狼	Bai Xiaoyue	
2010	Confucius	孔子春秋	Yan Weizai	
2010	Will You Marry Me and My Family	大女当嫁	Jiang Dayan	
2011	Windmill	风车	Ah Cai	
2012	The Shengtianmen Gate	圣天门口	Ah Shuang	
2012	The Brink	悬崖	Gu Qiuyan	
2012	The Bachelor	大男当婚	Zhao Kai	
2012	Fragrant Years	那样芬芳	Rong Fangfang	
2013	Jinan City is our Hometown	我们这拨人	Mu Ge	
2013	The Sweet Burden	小儿难养	Jian Ning	
2014	Forty Nine Days: Fiesta	四十九日·祭	Yu Mo	
2014	Nine Years	九年	Tang Kunkun	
2014	True Man	爷们儿	Chen Li	
2015	Hey Daddy	嘿，老头！	Yi Shuang	
2016	Young Marshal	少帅	Yu Fengzhi	
2020	Under the Sun	生活像阳光一样灿烂	Bai Canlan	
2020	Goodbye, My Love	白色月光	Zhang Yi	
2021	A Love for Dilemma	小舍得	Nan Li	
2021	Love at Night	夜色暗涌时	Li Yunyun	Cameo
2022	A Lifelong Journey	人世间	Zhou Rong	
2022	Pride & Price	盛装	Chen Kaiyi	
2023	In Spite of the Strong Wind	纵有疾风起	Shuo Bing	
2023	Echo	回响	Ran Dongdong	
2023	The Forerunner	问苍茫	Song Qing Ling	
2024	She and Her Girls	山花烂漫时	Zhang Guimei	
2024		抗战中的文艺	Xiao Hong	

== Discography ==
=== Albums ===
Year	English title	Chinese title
2007	Dream of Woman	女人的梦
2008	Can Or Cannot Have Happiness?	能不能幸福
2018	HER (EP)	
2019	Outside	在外面

=== Singles ===
Year	English title	Chinese title	Album
2011	"End of the Rainbow"	彩虹的尽头	Cold Steel OST
2012	"Growth"	成长	Fragrant Years OST
2016	"Flower"	花	When Larry Met Mary OST
2020	"Firmly Believe Love Will Win"	坚信爱会赢	Wuhan virus support theme song
2020	"Be With You"	陪着你	The Love Book OST

== Awards and nominations ==
Year	Award	Category	Nominated work	Result	Ref.
2007	26th Golden Rooster Awards	Best Supporting Actress	Curiosity Kills the Cat	Nominated	
2010	16th Chunyan Awards	Best Supporting Actress	Curiosity Kills the Cat	Won	
2012	18th Shanghai Television Festival	Best Actress	The Brink	Won	
2012	26th China TV Golden Eagle Award	Audience's Choice for Actress	The Brink	Won	
2012	26th China TV Golden Eagle Award	Best Performing Arts Award	The Brink	Won	
2012	55th Asia-Pacific Film Festival	Best Actress	Falling Flowers	Nominated	
2013	29th Golden Rooster Awards	Best Actress	Falling Flowers	Won	
2013	29th Flying Apsaras Awards	Outstanding Actress	The Brink, The Shengtianmen Gate	Nominated	
2013	15th Huabiao Awards	Outstanding Actress	Falling Flowers	Nominated	
2013	1st Vancouver Chinese Film Festival	Best Actress	Falling Flowers	Won	
2013	9th Chinese American Film Festival	Best Actress	Falling Flowers	Won	
2014	5th China Film Director's Guild Awards	Best Actress	Falling Flowers	Nominated	
2015	3rd Asia Pacific Film Festival New Zealand	Best Actress	Falling Flowers	Won	
2015	2nd Sino-American International TV Festival	Most Influential Actress	Hey Daddy	Won	
2016	1st Gold Aries Award	Best Actress	The Final Master	Won	
2016	20th Huading Awards	Best Actress	The Final Master	Won	
2016	7th China Film Director's Guild Awards	Best Actress	The Final Master	Nominated	
2016	23rd Beijing College Student Film Festival	Best Actress	The Final Master	Nominated	
2016	16th Chinese Film Media Awards	Best Actress	The Final Master	Nominated	
2016	22nd Shanghai Television Festival	Best Actress	Young Marshal	Nominated	
2016	20th Huading Awards	Best Actress (TV)	Young Marshal	Nominated	
2017	31st Golden Rooster Awards	Best Actress	When Larry Met Mary	Nominated	
2019	19th Chinese Film Media Awards	Best Actress	The Shadow Play	Won	
2019	11th China Film Director's Guild Awards	Best Actress	The Shadow Play	Nominated	
2019	Night of the Film	Actress of the Year	—N/a	Won	
2019	Tencent Entertainment White Paper	Quality Film Actor	—N/a	Won	
2021	3rd Asia Contents Awards	Best Actress	A Love for Dilemma	Won	
2024	29th Shanghai Television Festival	Best Supporting Actress	The Forerunner	Nominated	
2025	3rd CMG Annual Chinese TV Drama Ceremony	Actress of the Year	She and Her Girls	Won	
2025	1st China TV Drama Industry Conference	Actress of the Year	She and Her Girls	Won	
2025	30th Shanghai Television Festival	Best Actress	She and Her Girls	Won	
2025	16th China Film Director's Guild Awards	Best Actress	Her Story	Won	
2025	38th Golden Rooster Awards	Best Actress	Her Story	Won	
2026	38th Hundred Flowers Awards	Best Actress	Her Story	Nominated	
2026	38th Hundred Flowers Awards	Best Actress	Scare Out	Nominated	
2026	33rd China TV Golden Eagle Awards	Best Actress	She and Her Girls	Won	
2026	35th Flying Apsaras Awards	Outstanding Actress	She and Her Girls	Won	
2026	39th Golden Rooster Awards	Best Actress	The Volunteers: Peace at Last	Pending	
