= José Marchena Ruiz de Cueto =

Spanish author (1768–1821)

José Marchena Ruiz de Cueto (November 18, 1768 – January 31, 1821), also known as Abate Marchena, was a Spanish writer, who studied with distinction at the University of Salamanca.

He was born at Utrera. He took minor orders and was for some time professor at the seminary of Vergara, but he became a convert to the doctrines of the French philosophes, scandalizing his acquaintances by his professions of materialism and his denunciations of celibacy. His writings being brought before the Inquisition in 1792, Marchena escaped to Paris, where he is said to have collaborated with Marat in L'Ami du peuple; at a later date he organized a revolutionary movement at Bayonne, returned to Paris, avowed his sympathies with the Girondists, and refused the advances of Robespierre.

He acted as editor of L'Ami des lois and other French journals until 1799, when he was expelled from France; he succeeded, however, in obtaining employment under General Moreau, upon whose fall in 1804 he declared himself a Bonapartist.

In 1808 he accompanied Murat, brother in law of Napoléon Bonaparte, to Spain as private secretary; in this same year he was imprisoned by the Inquisition, but was released by Emperor Napoléon I brother Joseph Bonaparte, who appointed him editor of the official Gaceta.

In 1813 Marchena retired to Valencia, and thence to France, where he supported himself by translating into Spanish the works of Montesquieu, Rousseau, Voltaire and Volney.

The Liberal triumph of 1820 opened Spain to him once more, but he was coldly received by the revolutionary party. He died at Madrid shortly before February 26, 1821. The interest of his voluminous writings is almost wholly ephemeral, but they are excellent specimens of trenchant journalism. His Fragmentum Petronii (Basel, 1800), which purports to reconstruct missing passages in the current text of Petronius's Satyricon, is a testimony to Marchena's fine scholarship; but, by the irony of fate, Marchena is best known by his Ode to Christ Crucified, which breathes a spirit of profound and tender piety.
