= Shao Yihui =

Chinese film director and sceeenwriter

- Born: 1991 (age 34–35); Taiyuan, Shanxi, China
- Education: Beijing Film Academy
- Occupations: Film director screenwriter

Chinese name
- Simplified Chinese: 邵艺辉
Transcriptions
Standard Mandarin
- Hanyu Pinyin: Shào Yìhuī

Shao Yihui (Chinese: 邵艺辉) is a Chinese film director and screenwriter. She is known for her films B for Busy (2021) and Her Story (2024), and she won a Golden Rooster Award for Best Writing with the former.

== Early life ==
Shao Yihui was born in 1991. Her mother is a Chinese language primary school teacher, where Shao also received her education. Her father works as a lawyer. From a young age, Shao developed a passion for writing. She also discovered her love for movies towards the end of primary school, starting with horror films. During junior high school, she became fond of classic films, particularly Hollywood romance movies and Hong Kong cinema. In 2010, she was admitted to the Department of Literature at the Beijing Film Academy.

== Career ==
Shao Yihui made her directorial debut with the film B for Busy, a romantic comedy set in Shanghai. For this film, she received the Golden Rooster Award for Best Writing, as well as Young Director of the Year and Screenwriter of the Year at the China Film Director's Guild Awards. Her second film, Her Story was released in 2024. This film won Best Feature Film at the Golden Rooster Awards, in addition to the Screenwriter of the Year award at the China Film Director's Guild Awards.

== Filmography ==
Year	Title	Notes	Ref.
2021	B for Busy	Director, writer	
2024	Her Story	Director, writer	

== Accolades ==
Awards and nominations
Award	Year	Category	Nominated Work	Result	Ref.
Golden Rooster Awards	2022	Best Writing	B for Busy	Won	
China Film Director's Guild Awards	2024	Young Director of the Year (2021)	B for Busy	Won	
China Film Director's Guild Awards	2024	Screenwriter of the Year (2021)	B for Busy	Won	
Golden Rooster Awards	2025	Best Director	Her Story	Nominated	
Golden Rooster Awards	2025	Best Writing	Her Story	Nominated	
China Film Director's Guild Awards	2025	Director of the Year	Her Story	Nominated	
China Film Director's Guild Awards	2025	Screenwriter of the Year	Her Story	Won	
