= Trimalchio =

Fictional character in the Satyricon

Translated by Harry Thurston Peck

Trimalchio is a character in the 1st-century AD Roman work of fiction Satyricon by Petronius. He features as the ostentatious, nouveau-riche host in the section titled the "Cēna Trīmalchiōnis" (The Banquet of Trimalchio, often translated as "Dinner with Trimalchio"). Trimalchio is an arrogant former slave who has become quite wealthy as a wine merchant. The name "Trimalchio" is formed from the Greek prefix τρις and the Semitic מלך (melech) in its occidental form Malchio or Malchus. The fundamental meaning of the root is "King", and the name "Trimalchio" would thus mean "Thrice King" or "greatest King".

== Character description ==
His full name is "Gaius Pompeius Trimalchio Maecenatianus"; the references to Pompey and Maecenas in his name serve to enhance his ostentatious character. His wife's name is Fortunata, a former slave and chorus girl. Trimalchio is known for throwing lavish dinner parties, where his numerous slaves bring course after course of exotic delicacies, such as live birds sewn up inside a pig, live birds inside fake eggs which the guests have to "collect" themselves, and a dish to represent every sign of the zodiac.

The Satyricon has a lengthy description of Trimalchio's proposed tomb (71–72), which is ostentatious and lavish. By the end of the banquet, Trimalchio's drunken showiness leads to the entire household acting out his funeral, all for his own amusement and egotism.

== Cultural references ==
The term "Trimalchio" has become shorthand for the worst excesses of the nouveau riche.

- Trimalchio and Trimalchio's dinner is referenced in many English novels, from The Adventures of Peregrine Pickle (1758) to Pompeii (2003).
- There is a single mention of Trimalchio in F. Scott Fitzgerald's The Great Gatsby as his showy parties and background parallel those of Gatsby: Chapter 7 begins, "It was when curiosity about Gatsby was at its highest that the lights in his house failed to go on one Saturday night – and, as obscurely as it began, his career as Trimalchio was over." Trimalchio and Trimalchio in West Egg were among Fitzgerald's working titles for the novel. In the 2013 movie adaptation, a minor character is named Trimalchio.
- Trimalchio's feast is alluded to in the short story "Toga Party" by John Barth, which was included in The Best American Short Stories 2007, in reference to Tom and Patsy Hardison's lavish toga party.
- Thomas Love Peacock mentions Trimalchio and Niceros in his preface to Rhododaphne (1818).
- Albert Pike in the "Entered Apprentice" chapter of his Scottish Rite Freemasonry text Morals & Dogma (1871) references Trimalchio as an example of a legislator who spends the public purse lavishly or extravagantly – operating from their own vices and egotism. He counsels Scottish Rite Freemasons to stand against such lawmakers.
- In The Triumph of Love by Geoffrey Hill (1998), Trimalchio appears throughout the poem as one of its many personae.
- C. P. Snow references Trimalchio in Chapter 28 of In Their Wisdom (1974). The self-made magnate Swaffield hosts a party in order to restore favour with influential figures within the Conservative party, “…he acted as though giving a Cabinet Minister a good dinner was likely to make him a friend for life. Would it have been better, sceptics could have pondered, to avoid the ghost of Trimalchio and give that Cabinet Minister a cheese sandwich at the local pub?”. The party was held on Thursday 20 July 1972 at 27 Hill Street, W1, “There were, though, considerable departures from Trimalchio about the July party. It had to be stately, Swaffield decided before he got down to planning…”.
- DBC Pierre's novel Lights Out in Wonderland climaxes with a dinner party closely modeled on that of Trimalchio.
- Robin Brooks refers to Trimalchio in The Portland Vase, recounting the tale of a glass maker who claimed to have made unbreakable glass. On demonstrating this and confirming he had not shared the production method, the craftsman was beheaded to protect Roman Industry.
- Cormac McCarthy’s novel The Passenger has the Falstaffian character John Sheddan state to the protagonist Bobby Western, “Trimalchio is wiser than Hamlet” to summarise his discourse on the condition of modern man.
- H. P. Lovecraft's short story "The Rats in the Walls" includes a nightmare of a "Roman feast like that of Trimalchio, with a horror in a covered platter."
