= Xiaocheng zhi chun =

Xiaocheng zhi chun (Chinese: 小城之春; pinyin: Xiǎochéng zhī chūn) is the Chinese title of two films:

- Spring in a Small Town (dir. Fei Mu, 1948)
- Springtime in a Small Town (dir. Tian Zhuangzhuang, 2002)
