= Zhao Fei =

Chinese cinematographer (born 1961)

- Born: 1961 (age 64–65); Xi'an, Shaanxi
- Occupation: Cinematographer/Director of Photography
- Awards: LAFCA Award for Best Cinematography; Raise the Red Lantern (1992); NSFC Award for Best Cinematography; Raise the Red Lantern (1993); Golden Deer for Best Cinematography; The Sun Also Rises (2008); Golden Rooster Awards – Best Cinematography; The Emperor and the Assassin (1999)

Chinese name
- Traditional Chinese: 赵非
- Simplified Chinese: 趙非
Transcriptions
Standard Mandarin
- Hanyu Pinyin: Zhào Fēi

Zhao Fei (simplified Chinese: 赵非; traditional Chinese: 趙非, Mandarin pronunciation: [ʈʂɑ̂u̯ féi̯]; born 1961) is a Chinese cinematographer and frequent collaborator to many directors of China's so-called "fifth generation" film movement. Zhao also served as Woody Allen's director of photography for three films between 1998 and 2001.

== Biography ==
Born in 1961 in Xi'an, Shaanxi province, Zhao was the son of an architect. Growing up during the turbulent years of the Cultural Revolution, Zhao began his career in film when he applied to the newly reopened Beijing Film Academy in 1978. Zhao would study cinematography and graduate in 1982 with others of the so-called "fifth generation" including directors Chen Kaige, Zhang Yimou, and Tian Zhuangzhuang.

Working throughout the 1980s, Zhao would act as the director of photography ("DOP") for Tian Zhuangzhuang's The Horse Thief, Huang Jianxin's Samsara, and others. In 1991, Zhao worked with director Zhang Yimou on his magnum opus, Raise the Red Lantern. For Zhao, the production of Raise the Red Lantern was a crucial turning point, allowing him to synthesize his previous experiences with painting and art and his current responsibilities as a cinematographer.

By the late 1990s, Zhao had built up an impressive resume, but little would prepare him for the working with Chen Kaige on his historical epic The Emperor and the Assassin. Chen specifically asked for Zhao to work as the DOP for the project, realizing that the ambitious scope of the film would need someone who was disciplined but resourceful. Zhao's work on The Emperor and the Assassin would take up months and then years, and required Zhao to research historical castles, fortifications, and the minutiae of China's Warring States period. The actual production was equally intense, as Zhao would often have to create makeshift dollies and other contraptions to capture shots.

By this point, Zhao's work in China had caught the eye of international filmmakers, and Zhao would serve as the DOP for three of American director Woody Allen's films, beginning with Sweet and Lowdown. Allen had first noticed Zhao's work from Raise the Red Lantern, though Zhao claims that he is unsure why Allen selected him. The production on Sweet and Lowdown was difficult at times, given Zhao's lack of English-speaking abilities and the difficulties of keeping a translator on set at all times. But both Zhao and Allen walked away from the experience pleased with the collaboration, and Zhao would work with Allen on two more films. Allen, himself, praised the Chinese cinematographer, comparing Zhao favorably with Allen's past DOPs, including Carlo Di Palma, Gordon Willis, and Sven Nykvist.

== Filmography ==
Year	English Title	Chinese Title	Director	Notes
1986	The Horse Thief	盗马贼	Tian Zhuangzhuang	With Hou Yong
1987	Death Visits the Living	一个死者对生者的访问	Huang Jianzhong	
1988	Unforgettable Life	特别手术室	Tian Zhuangzhuang	
1988	Samsara	轮回	Huang Jianxin	
1991	Li Lianying: The Imperial Eunuch	大太监李莲英	Tian Zhuangzhuang	
1992	Raise the Red Lantern	大红灯笼高高挂	Zhang Yimou	Winner of the 1993 National Society of Film Critics Award for Best Cinematography; Winner of the 1992 Los Angeles Film Critics Association Award for Best Cinematography
1995	Forbidden City: The Great Within	N/A		Documentary for the Discovery Channel
1995	Sweet Grass	甘草	Zhou Youchou	
1996	The Sun Has Ears	太阳有耳	Yim Ho	
1997	Dragon Town Story	龙城正月	Yang Fengliang	
1997	Concerto of Life	生命如歌	Xia Gang	
1998	Be There or Be Square	不见不散	Feng Xiaogang	
1998	The Emperor and the Assassin	荊柯刺秦王	Chen Kaige	Winner of the 1999 Golden Rooster for Best Cinematography
1999	Sweet and Lowdown	N/A	Woody Allen	
2000	Small Time Crooks	N/A	Woody Allen	
2001	The Curse of the Jade Scorpion	N/A	Woody Allen	
2003	Warriors of Heaven and Earth	天地英雄	He Ping	
2003	Cell Phone	手机	Feng Xiaogang	
2007	The Sun Also Rises	太阳照常升起	Jiang Wen	With Lee Ping-bing and Yang Tao
2009	Iron Men	铁人	Yin Li	
2010	Driverless	无人驾驶	Zhang Yang	
2010	Let the Bullets Fly	让子弹飞	Jiang Wen	
2012	Guns and Roses	黄金大劫案	Ning Hao	
2014	The Crossing	太平轮	John Woo	
2015	The Left Ear	左耳	Alec Su	
