= 2007 Shanghai International Film Festival =

Chinese film festival

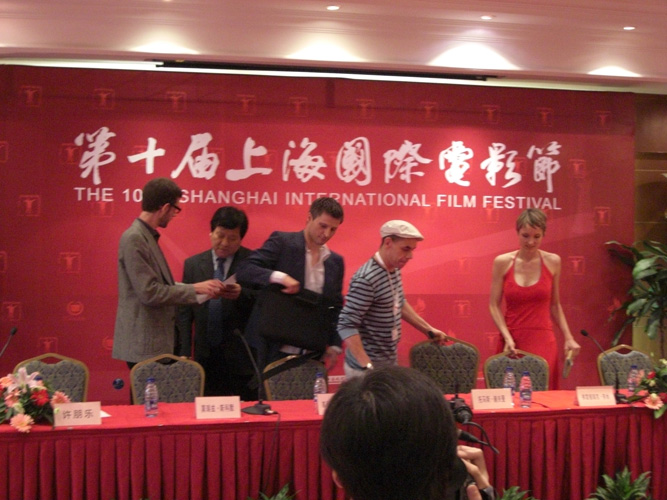
Sebastian Bieniek (middle), press conference 2007 Shanghai International Film Festival

The 2007 Shanghai International Film Festival was the 10th such festival devoted to international cinema to be held in the city of Shanghai in the People's Republic of China. It was held from June 16 to June 24, 2007. It was one of twelve film festivals to be accredited in 2007 by the International Federation of Film Producers Association (FIAPF).

The festival was composed of three sections: the Golden Goblet (Jin Jue) competition, the Asian New Talent Section, and an International Panorama.

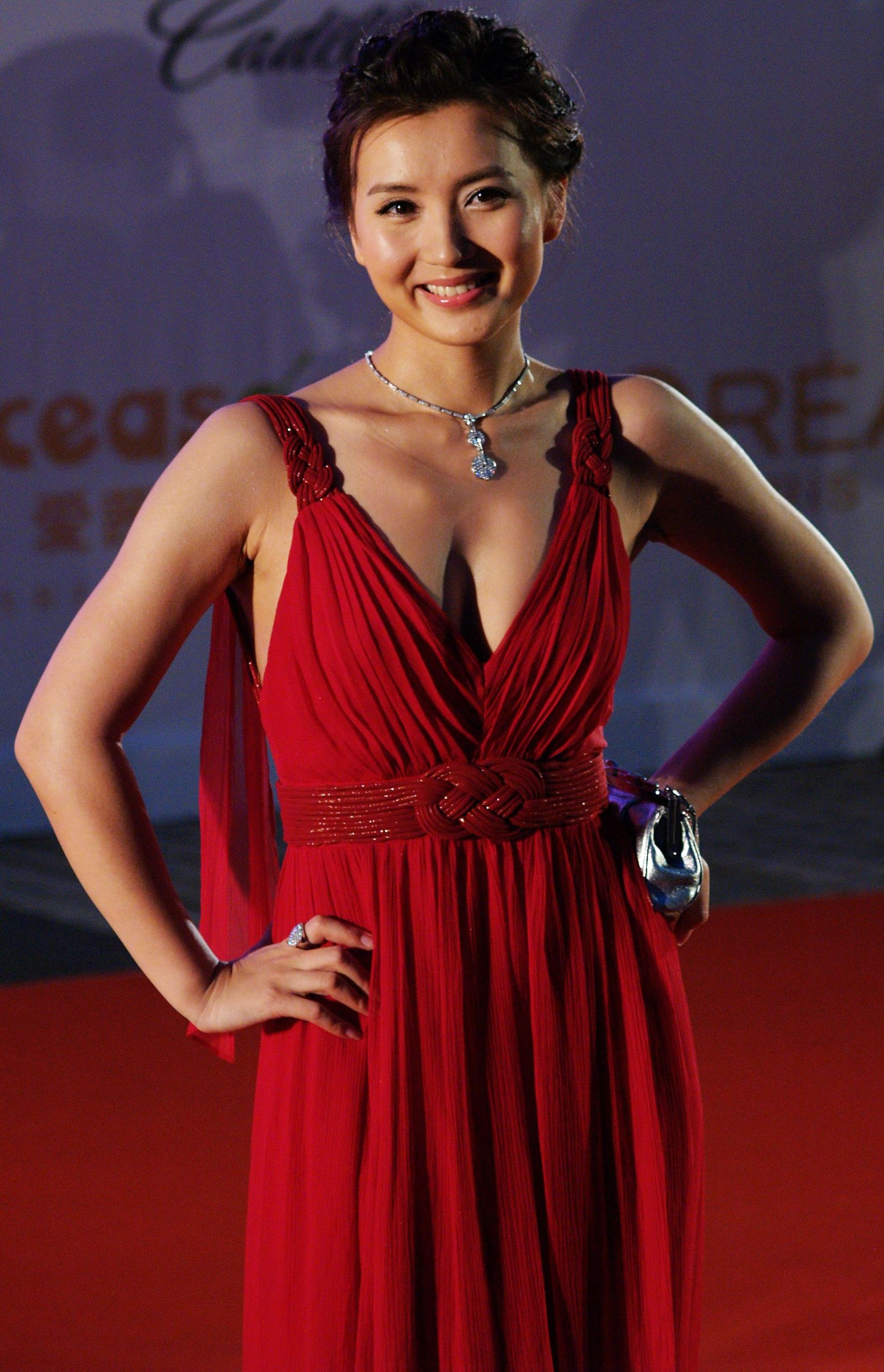
Chen Hao at 2007

== Films in competition ==
Title	Director	Country
According to the Plan	Franziska Meletzky	Germany
Bizan	Isshin Inudo	Japan
Doghead	Santi Amodeo	Spain
Eye in the Sky	Yau Nai-Hoi	Hong Kong/China
The Gamblers	Sebastian Bieniek	Germany
The Go Master	Tian Zhuangzhuang	China
Jump!	Joshua Sinclair	Austria
The Knot	Yin Li	China
Miguel Y William	Ines Paris	Spain/British Virgin Islands
The New Man	Klaus Härö	Sweden/Finland
Olga, Victoria Olga	Mercedes Farriols	Argentina
Radio Star	Lee Joon-ik	South Korea
Shanghai Red	Oscar Luis Costo	United States of America/China

== Juries ==
=== Golden Goblet ===
- Chen Kaige (China) (head of jury)
- Fernando Trueba (Spain)
- Michael Ballhaus (Germany)
- Maria Grazia Cucinotta (Italy)
- Luc Jacquet (France)
- Lu Chuan (China)
- Kohei Oguri (Japan)

=== Asia New Talent ===
- He Ping (China) (head of jury)
- Mabel Cheung (Hong Kong)
- Jean-Michel Frodon (France)
- Isao Yukisada (Japan)
- Apichatpong Weerasethakul (Thailand)

== Awards ==
=== Golden Goblet ===
- Golden Goblet for Best Film
  - According to the Plan, directed by Franziska Meletzky (Germany)
- Jury Grand Prix
  - The New Man, directed by Klaus Härö (Finland/Sweden)
- Golden Goblet for Best Director
  - Tian Zhuangzhuang for The Go Master (China)
- Golden Goblet for Best Actor
  - Juan José Ballesta for Doghead (Spain)
- Golden Goblet for Best Actress
  - Corinna Harfouch, Dagmar Manzel, Kirsten Block, Christine Schorn for According To The Plan (Germany)
- Best Screenplay
  - Shemi Zarhin for Aviva My Love (Israel)
- Best Cinematography
  - Wang Yu for The Go Master (China)
- Best Music
  - Isao Tomita for Love and Honor (Japan)
- Special Award
  - The Knot, directed by Yin Li (director) (China)

=== Asian New Talent Award ===
- Best Film
  - Bliss directed by Sheng Zhimin
- Best Director
  - Golam Rabbany Biplob for On the Wings of Dreams
- Audience Award
  - The Case directed by Wang Fen
