= The Horse Thief =

- Film poster
- Traditional Chinese: 盜馬賊
- Simplified Chinese: 盗马贼
- Hanyu Pinyin: Dào mǎ zéi
- Directed by: Tian Zhuangzhuang
- Written by: Zhang Rui
- Produced by: Wu Tianming
- Starring: Daiba; Jiji Dan; Drashi; Gaoba; Jamco Jayang; Rigzin Tseshang
- Cinematography: Hou Yong; Zhao Fei
- Edited by: Li Jingzhong
- Music by: Qu Xiaosong
- Production company: Xi'an Film Studio
- Distributed by: International Film Circuit; Les Films de l'Atalante
- Release date: 1986
- Running time: 88 minutes
- Country: China
- Languages: Mandarin; Tibetan

The Horse Thief is a 1986 Chinese film by director Tian Zhuangzhuang. It follows one of Tian's favorite topics, Chinese minorities, a topic he touched upon in 1984's On the Hunting Ground and would return to in 2004's documentary, Delamu. Like these other films, The Horse Thief shows Tian's fascination with China's ethnic minorities, and in particular the Buddhist ceremonies that these peoples practice.

== Plot ==
The film follows the titular horse thief, Norbu who struggles to support his family in Tibet. After his son dies, however, Norbu strives to change his ways. At the film's end, he decides to steal horses again to support his family. He is caught and tells his family to return to the village where they will be welcomed while he fends off the owner. He is eventually killed at the end of the movie, though the scene is not made visible. Mirroring the starkness of the landscape, the film is largely free of dialogue, with only the occasional exchange between characters.

== Cast ==
- Rigzin Tseshang as Norbu
- Jiji Dan as Dolma, wife
- Jamco Jayang as Tashi, son
- Daiba as Granny
- Drashi as Grandfather
- Gaoba as Nowre

== Reception ==
On review aggregator Rotten Tomatoes, The Horse Thief has an approval rating of 96% based on 27 reviews. Derek Adams from Time Out gave the film a good review: "It offers the most awesomely plausible account of Tibetan life and culture ever seen in the west. It's one of the few films whose images show you things you've never seen before". Janet Maslin from The New York Times gave it three out of five stars, concluding: "The Chinese film The Horse Thief is best watched as pure spectacle, since it unfolds almost entirely without benefit of dialogue. What little talk there is tends to be plain and to the point (If only we had stew). However, from the scenic and ethnographic standpoints the film is often quite arresting". Jonathan Rosenbaum writing for the Chicago Reader praising the film, saying: "Tian's originality and mastery of sound and image communicate directly, beyond the immediate trappings of the film's slender plot (a horse thief expelled from his clan) and regional culture (Buddhist death rituals), expressing an environmental and ecological mysticism that suggests a new relationship between man and nature. Tian had said that he made this for the 21st century, yet even today it's a film of the future".

In 1988, The Horse Thief won the "Distribution Help Award" (tied with Yeelen) at the Fribourg International Film Festival.

Film director Martin Scorsese listed the film (which was not widely released in foreign countries until the early 1990s) as the number one film of the decade on the television show Roger Ebert & the Movies. Since Ebert's colleague Gene Siskel had died earlier on in the year, Ebert invited Scorsese as a special guest to share his top ten list in 1999.

In April 2019, a restored version of the film was selected to be shown in the Cannes Classics section at the 2019 Cannes Film Festival.
