= Hou Yong =

Hou Yong may refer to:

- Hou Yong (cinematographer) (born 1960), Chinese cinematographer and film director
- Hou Yong (actor) (born 1967), Chinese actor
