= Wang Yu (filmmaker) =

Chinese cinematographer

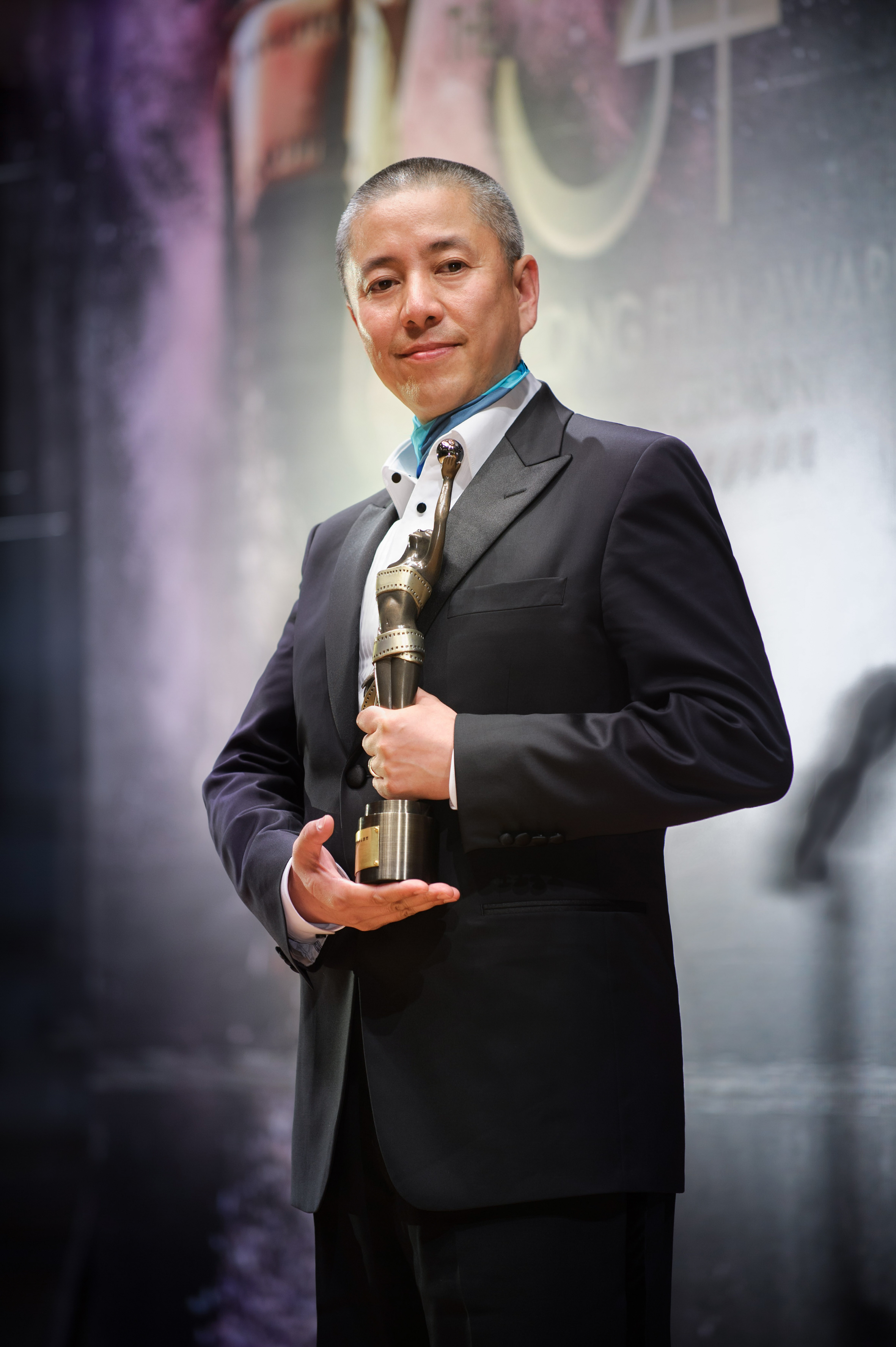
- Wang at The 34th Hong Kong Film Awards "Best Cinematography" - The Golden Era - April 2015
- Education: Beijing Film Academy
- Occupations: Director, cinematographer
- Years active: 1998 – present
- Awards: Hong Kong Film Awards – Best Cinematography; 2015 The Golden Era 2007 Shanghai International Film Festival – Jin Jue for Best Cinematography; 2007 The Go Master

Wang Yu (Chinese: 王昱) is a Chinese film director and cinematographer graduated from the Beijing Film Academy. Yu started his movie career in the 1990s and over the past decades, he has achieved great success as an esteemed cinematographer. Yu has collaborated with many prominent Chinese Filmmakers and Directors, including Tian Zhuangzhuang, Lou Ye, and Li Yu. He began his career in 1998 with Lou Ye's film Suzhou River.

Yu Wang is a recipient of numerous international accolades. For his work on the film The Go Master, He was awarded the Golden Goblet for Best Cinematography at the 10th Shanghai International Film Festival in 2007, and nominated for Achievement in Cinematography at the 2007 Asia Pacific Screen Awards. In 2015, He is the recipient of Hong Kong Film Award for Best Cinematography with The Golden Era.

== Filmography ==
=== As cinematographer ===
Year	English Title	Chinese Title	Director	Notes
2000	Suzhou River	苏州河	Lou Ye	
2000	A Lingering Face	非常夏日	Lu Xuechang	
2001	All the Way	走到底	Shi Runjiu	
2001	Quitting	昨天	Zhang Yang	
2002	Zhou Yu's Train	周渔的火车	Sun Zhou	
2003	Purple Butterfly	紫蝴蝶	Lou Ye	
2004	Delamu	茶马古道：德拉姆	Tian Zhuangzhuang	
2006	The Go Master	呉清源	Tian Zhuangzhuang	Golden Goblet for Best Cinematography at the 2007 Shanghai International Film Festival
2007	Lost in Beijing	苹果	Li Yu	
2007	The Western Trunk Line	西干道	Li Jixian	
2008	24 City	二十四城记	Jia Zhangke	With Yu Lik-wai
2008	Lost Indulgence	迷果	Zhang Yibai	
2009	The Warrior and the Wolf	狼灾记	Tian Zhuangzhuang	
2010	Little Sister		Richard Bowen	
2014	The Golden Era	黄金时代	Ann Hui	Hong Kong Film Award for Best Cinematography
2015	A Tale of Three Cities		Mabel Cheung	

=== As director ===
Year	English Title	Chinese Title	Notes
2019	The Guilty Ones	你是凶手	
