= Emi Wada =

Japanese costume designer (1937–2021)

- Born: Emiko Noguchi; 18 March 1937; Kyoto, Japan
- Died: 13 November 2021 (aged 84)
- Spouse: Ben Wada (1957–2011)
- Awards: Best Costume Design; 1985 Ran; Outstanding Individual Achievement in Costume Design for a Variety or Music Program; 1993 Oedipus Rex

Emi Wada (和田 惠美, Wada Emi, 18 March 1937 – 13 November 2021) was a Japanese costume designer who worked extensively in stage, screen, and ballet productions. She was born in Kyoto, and attended Kyoto City University of Arts before she married Tsutomu (Ben) Wada at age 20. She was nominated for 13 awards and won six, most notably the Academy Award for Best Costume Design for her work on Akira Kurosawa's film Ran (1985). Wada died on 13 November 2021, at the age of 84.

== Early life and education ==
Wada was born in Kyoto Prefecture. She was the eldest of four daughters and went to high school at Doshisha Girls’ Junior High School. Wada wanted to become a painter, and even though there were few women studying painting in university, her liberal family supported her dream. She took the entrance exam and entered the Department of Western Painting in Kyoto City University of Arts.

While visiting Yoshihide Yoda, her mother’s acquaintance who worked on film screenplays, Wada met Tsutomu (Ben) Wada. Tsutomu Wada was a NHK Osaka TV drama director at the time. Wada had recently submitted her work to the New York Parson School of Arts and the Chicago Art Institute. However, instead of studying abroad on scholarship, she married Tsutomu Wada at age 20, six months after their first encounter.

Despite having initially gone to school to become a painter, her relationship with her husband led to designing the stage effects and costumes for plays he was involved with. From then, Wada continued designing for the stage.

== Career ==
She created costumes for the Akira Kurosawa film Ran, which earned her an Academy Award for costume design, the Peter Greenaway film Prospero's Books, and the Zhang Yimou films, Hero and House of Flying Daggers. She designed costumes for operas, including the 2006 premiere performance of Tan Dun's The First Emperor and for ballets, including The Peony Pavilion by Fei Bo (National Ballet of China, 2008).

Wada also designed the costumes for the 2018 Chinese adaptation of Shakespeare's King Lear.

She released multiple books of her works, including My Costumes, EMI WADA WORKS, and My Life in the Making, the latter of which was created on pieces of textiles with pictures of her work inside.

Wada died on 13 November 2021, at the age of 84.

== Awards ==
Wada and her costumes were nominated for thirteen awards and won six.

Year	Title	Award	Result
1986	Ran	Academy Award for Best Costume Design	Won
1987	Ran	BAFTA Award for Best Costume Design	Nominated
1993	Oedipus Rex	Primetime Emmy Award for Outstanding Individual Achievement in Costume Design for a Variety or Music Program	Won
1998	The Soong Sisters	Hong Kong Film Award for Best Costume & Make Up Design	Won
2003	Hero	Hong Kong Film Award for Best Costume/Make Up	Won
2005	Hero	OFTA Award for Best Costume Design	Nominated
2005	House of Flying Daggers	BAFTA Award for Best Costume Design	Nominated
2005	House of Flying Daggers	Satellite Award for Best Costume Design	Nominated
2005	House of Flying Daggers	OFTA Award for Best Costume Design	Won
2005	House of Flying Daggers	NETPAC Award for Best Costume Design and Make Up	Won
2005	House of Flying Daggers	INOCA Award for Best Costume Design	Nominated
2005	House of Flying Daggers	Golden Derby Film Award for Costume Design	Nominated
2007	The Restless	Grand Bell Award for Best Costume Design	Nominated
2007	The Go Master	Asian Film Award for Best Production Designer	Nominated
2009	The Warrior and the Wolf	Golden Horse Award for Best Makeup & Costume Design	Nominated
2010	The Warrior and the Wolf	Asian Film Award for Best Costume Designer	Nominated
2011	Reign of Assassins	Hong Kong Film Award for Best Costume & Make Up Design	Nominated
2022	Love After Love	Hong Kong Film Award for Best Costume & Make Up Design	Nominated

== Reception ==
Her work for the 2015 production of The Peony Pavilion was described by The Washington Post as "some of the loveliest ballet creations in memory" with the newspaper further noting that: "Skirt hems flickered like flames as the dancers moved, and the leading ballerina’s sheer overdress floated around her like an afterglow."

=== Recent works ===
- Rokumeikan (1986)
- Princess from the Moon (1987)
- Rikyu (1989)
- Dream (1990)
- Prospero’s Books (1991)
- The Pillow Book (1997)
- The Soong Sisters (1998)
- 8 ½ Women (2000)
- Hero (2002)
- Lovers (2004)
- House of Flying Daggers (2005)
- Spirit (2006)
- The Go Master (2007)
- Mongol (2007)
- Warrior & Wolf (2011)
- Reign of Assassins (2011)
- Wu Dang (2013)
- Oh My General (2017)
- Ran (2017)
- Lady Of The Dynasty (2017)
- God of War (2018)
- They Say Nothing Stays the Same (2019)
- Samurai Marathon (2019)
- Love After Love (2020)
