= Delamu =

- Theatrical poster
- Directed by: Tian Zhuangzhuang
- Written by: Tian Zhuangzhuang
- Produced by: Takahiro Hamano; Yang Zhao; Hao Lee
- Cinematography: Wang Yu; Wu Qiao
- Edited by: Cui Jian; Zhang Dalong
- Music by: Li Zhao
- Release date: April 13, 2004 (China)
- Running time: 110 minutes
- Country: China
- Languages: Mandarin; Tibetan

Delamu (simplified Chinese: 茶马古道：德拉姆; traditional Chinese: 茶馬古道：德拉姆; pinyin: Cha ma gudao: de la mu) is a 2004 documentary film directed by Fifth Generation Chinese filmmaker Tian Zhuangzhuang. Delamu documents the people living in the Nujiang River Valley, along the Tea Horse Road, an ancient trade route between China's Yunnan province and Tibet. The film was jointly produced by companies in the People's Republic of China, and Japan. It had its American premier at the 2004 Tribeca Film Festival.

The title "Delamu" refers to the Tibetan word for "peaceful angel", and the name of one of the mules owned by a villager in the film.

== Synopsis ==
Stretching across Yunnan, Tibet, and into the Himalayas, the heart of Delamu is the "Tea Horse Road" (Chinese: 茶马古道). One of the oldest caravan routes in Asia, the film documents one such caravan as it transfers raw material to a modern construction site.

As Tian travels with the caravan, he interviews people who have lived along the road for decades, including a priest who was thought to have disappeared during the Cultural Revolution, a 104-year-old woman, and a mule driver who owns the titular Delamu.

== Reception ==
Though quiet and a far cry from either the insulated Springtime in a Small Town or the epic The Blue Kite, Tian's Delamu has nevertheless garnered both praise and some criticism. On the one hand it has been well received by critics in Asia. The inaugural Chinese Film Directors Association Awards bestowed its honor for best director to Tian for Delamu. It has similarly been well received in the West. In its premier at Tribeca, Delamu's cinematography of the stunning landscape was praised by critics.

On the other hand, many critics often cannot help but to compare the film to Tian's account of the Cultural Revolution, The Blue Kite, often negatively. One notes the "travelogue sheen" as preventing real penetration into the subject matter. Another (admittedly a socialist critic) complained that Delamu despite its beauty, was a "National Geographic style travelogue [that] broke no new ground."
