= Li Lianying =

Chinese imperial eunuch (1848–1911)

- 李連英
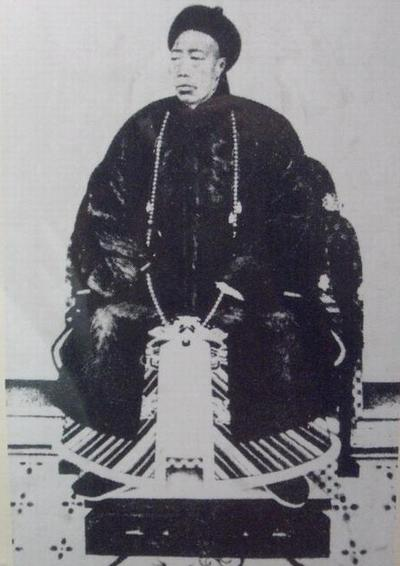
- Li Lianying

Chief eunuch
- In office 1869–1908
- Preceded by: An Dehai
- Succeeded by: Xiao Dezhang

Personal details
- Born: Li Yingtai (李英泰); 12 November 1848 Zhili Province, Qing China
- Died: 4 March 1911 (aged 62) Beijing, Qing China
- Nickname(s): Little Li (小李子), Grand Supervisor Li (李大總管)

Li Lianying (simplified Chinese: 李连英; traditional Chinese: 李連英; pinyin: Lǐ Liányīng; 12 November 1848 – 4 March 1911) was a Chinese imperial eunuch who lived in the late Qing dynasty. He was a eunuch during the regency of Empress Dowager Cixi, who was the de facto ruler of China from 1861 to 1908 throughout the reigns of the Tongzhi Emperor and Guangxu Emperor.

== Names ==
Li's birth name was Li Yingtai (Chinese: 李英泰; pinyin: Lǐ Yīngtài). He was renamed Li Jinxi (simplified Chinese: 李进喜; traditional Chinese: 李進喜; pinyin: Lǐ Jìnxǐ) after entering the Forbidden City as a palace eunuch in 1856. In 1869, Empress Dowager Cixi gave him a new name, Li Lianying (simplified Chinese: 李连英; traditional Chinese: 李連英; pinyin: Lǐ Liányīng), which became the name he is best known by.

== Life ==
Li was born in a poor family in Zhili Province (roughly present-day Hebei) in 1848 during the reign of the Daoguang Emperor. In 1853, when he was around six years old, he was castrated and sent to serve as a eunuch in the residence of Prince Zheng. In 1856, he was sent to serve as a palace eunuch in the Forbidden City. He was promoted to the position of "Second Supervisor" (二總管) in 1867.

In 1869, An Dehai, the eunuch who served as Grand Supervisor (大總管), was executed by Ding Baozhen, the Provincial Governor of Shandong, for travelling out of the Forbidden City without permission. Earlier in 1861, Li had helped Empress Dowager Cixi in seizing power from a group of eight regents in the Xinyou Coup, and hence earned her favour. As such, after An Dehai's death, the Empress Dowager chose Li to be her new personal attendant and subsequently promoted him to the position of Grand Supervisor.

As Grand Supervisor and Empress Dowager Cixi's favourite attendant, Li held a highly influential position in the inner palace. He had control over things such as when officials could be granted an audience with the Empress Dowager and, as such, managed to acquire wealth from the bribes he collected from officials. When the imperial consorts infuriated Empress Dowager Cixi, Li helped them by speaking good about them in front of the Empress Dowager. Li was suspected of poisoning the Guangxu Emperor, who died in 1908 one day before Cixi's death.

Li requested permission from Empress Dowager Longyu to retire after the death of Empress Dowager Cixi in 1908. Longyu approved his request and allowed him to return home after 100 days had passed since Cixi's death. Li lived the rest of his remaining years in retirement and died in 1911 before the Xinhai Revolution broke out. He was buried in Enjizhuang (恩濟莊) in present-day Haidian District, Beijing. Li was believed to have died from dysentery. However, when his grave was raided in 1966 during the Cultural Revolution, the raiders discovered that his grave contained only his skull, and hence there were rumours that he was murdered (possibly decapitated). Li's grave was heavily damaged during the Cultural Revolution and only a fragment of his tombstone is left.

== Portrayals in media ==
The 1991 Chinese film Li Lianying: The Imperial Eunuch, directed by Tian Zhuangzhuang, is based on Li's life and starred Jiang Wen as Li. The 2006 Chinese television series Princess Der Ling starred Wu Liping as Li. The 2012 Hong Kong television series The Confidant, produced by TVB, is also based on Li's life and starred Wayne Lai as Li.
