= The Go Master =

- Theatrical release poster
- 呉清源 極みの棋譜
- Directed by: Tian Zhuangzhuang
- Written by: Ah Cheng; Zou Jingzhi
- Produced by: Liu Xiaodian
- Starring: Chang Chen; Sylvia Chang; Akira Emoto; Ayumi Ito
- Cinematography: Wang Yu
- Edited by: Yang Hongyu
- Music by: Li Zhao
- Production companies: Century Hero Film Investment; Hakuhodo
- Distributed by: Fortissimo Films
- Release date: September 27, 2006 (New York Film Festival)
- Running time: 104 minutes
- Countries: China; Japan
- Languages: Chinese; Japanese

The Go Master (呉清源 極みの棋譜, Go Seigen: Kiwami no Kifu) (simplified Chinese: 吴清源; traditional Chinese: 吳清源; pinyin: Wú Qīngyuán) is a 2006 biopic film directed by Tian Zhuangzhuang. It depicts the twentieth century Go master Wu Qingyuan, better known as Go Seigen, the Japanese pronunciation of his name. The film, which premiered at the 44th New York Film Festival, focuses on the life of this extraordinary player from his meteoric rise as a child prodigy to fame and fortune as a revolutionary strategic thinker, as well as the tumultuous global conflicts between his homeland and his adopted nation. The film also features a scene involving the Atomic bomb go game. The film also screened at the AFI's China Film Festival in Silver Spring, Maryland.

== Plot ==
With the breakout of the Sino-Japanese War in the 1930s, Wu Qingyuan (Chang Chen) and his family are thrown into an uncomfortable and dangerous position as Chinese nationals residing in Japan. While Wu's family returns to China, he chooses to stay behind in his adopted country to continue to pursue the game of Go. In the quiet recluse of his school, there are no politics, only the singular dedication to his art and the love for his wife Kazuko (Ayumi Ito). However, the chaos of the times eventually forces him out of his enclave, throwing his life and mind into conflict.

Wu's career ends abruptly when he is struck by a motorcycle in a collision which does not appear to be an accident. This real-life incident may have been a conspiracy against him by opponents in the world of Go, where he remained an unshakable winner. He is later hospitalized and can no longer play Go due to brain trauma. Despite this, the film ends nostalgically in the golden room of Go.

== Cast ==
- Chang Chen as Wu Qingyuan
- Sylvia Chang as Shu Wen
- Akira Emoto as Kensaku Segoe
- Ayumi Ito as Kazuko Nakahara
- Xin Baiqing as Wu Yan
- Keiko Matsuzaka as Fumiko Kita
- Kaho Minami as Nagako Nagaoka
- Hironobu Nomura as Yasunari Kawabata
- Takashi Nishina as Minoru Kitani
- Nao Omori as Utaro Hashimoto
- Takayuki Inoue as Shusai Honinbo
- Betty Huang as Wu Qingying
- Li Xuejian as Li Yutang

== Production ==
Wu Qingyuan is played by Taiwanese actor Chang Chen. Chang was nominated for the 2006 Golden Horse Award for best actor for his portrayal. The real Wu Qingyuan makes a short cameo appearance in the film's prologue. Produced by Liu Xiaodian with executive producers Wang Jun, Own Chen, Wouter Barendrecht, and Michael J. Werner. The screenplay was written by Ah Cheng. Costume design was by the acclaimed Emi Wada, famous for such films as Kurosawa's Ran, Dreams, as well as Zhang Yimou's Hero and House of Flying Daggers.

== Critical reception ==
A.O. Scott of The New York Times called The Go Master "a stately and respectful biopic", as well as "deliberate and contemplative rather than dramatic or psychologically probing" and "gorgeously shot". The film was nominated for Achievement in Cinematography at the 2007 Asia Pacific Screen Awards.
