= The Warrior and the Wolf =

- Film poster
- Directed by: Tian Zhuangzhuang
- Written by: Tian Zhuangzhuang
- Based on: The Warrior and the Wolf by Yasushi Inoue
- Produced by: William Kong; Hao Lee; Satoru Ogura; Han Sanping
- Starring: Maggie Q Tou Chung-hua; Joe Odagiri
- Cinematography: Wang Yu
- Edited by: Wenders Li
- Distributed by: EDKO
- Release dates: September 13, 2009 (Toronto); October 2, 2009 (China)
- Running time: 100 minutes
- Country: China
- Language: Mandarin

The Warrior and the Wolf (simplified Chinese: 狼灾记; traditional Chinese: 狼災記; pinyin: láng zāi jì) is a 2009 Chinese historical action film directed by Tian Zhuangzhuang. It tells the story of the battle between two ancient warriors. Tian made this film after his work The Go Master in 2006.

Filming began in fall 2008 in China's northwest Xinjiang Autonomous Region. The film was released in late 2009.

The Warrior and the Wolf was co-produced by companies from Hong Kong (Edko Films), Singapore (MediaCorp Raintree Pictures), and China (Perfect World Culture).

== Plot ==
General Zhang is the commander of a northern border's army camp, which repels the attacking barbarians every year. When snowfall makes the support of the base with supplies impossible, the troops return home.

Lu Shenkang is a newly recruited soldier who was a shepherd, has no courage, and tries to flee the army on several occasions. Lu bonds with General Zhang and when the barbarians attack and take him hostage, Lu exchanges him with a captured tribal prince.

The wounded General Zhang returns home earlier than expected and Lu stays in charge.

When the winter's snow arrives, he leads his men on the trip home. Due to the harsh weather, they take refuge in the Harran tribe's village. There Lu takes a hut and a woman for himself.

Shortly before the soldiers leave the village to continue their return home, the woman tells Lu that legend says that for her people, being intimate with outsiders leads to them becoming wolves.

The army marches on and are attacked by wolves. A following sand storm kills all but Lu, who returns to the village.

Years later the barbarians surrender to Imperial China, and General Zhang returns to the region to deliver the court's messages. Two of his men shoot at dogs and are found dead in the morning. General Zhang is bitten to death by two wolves after riding out to a deserted fortification.

== Cast ==
- Maggie Q - plays a woman of the Harran tribe. Actress Maggie Q was cast in the lead role in September 2008 as a replacement for Tang Wei, who was originally chosen. Due to Tang's role in Ang Lee's sexually explicit Lust, Caution, however, she was banned from acting in mainland Chinese productions by the State Administration of Radio, Film, and Television.
- Tou Chung-hua - General Zhang
- Joe Odagiri - Lu, a soldier who was a former shepherd

== Reception ==
Critical reception was generally poor. Perry Lam writes in Muse Magazine, 'The original story is both a heartfelt tribute to physical love as a life force and an angry condemnation of the aggressive instincts of human beings... To transport the story to ancient China, and, through the novelty of casting, to have a Japanese actor play the role of a Chinese warrior and an American Vietnamese play a Chinese widow, is not to challenge the imagination but to impoverish it.'
