= Unforgettable Life =

- DVD cover
- Directed by: Tian Zhuangzhuang
- Written by: Xia Lan
- Starring: Li Xuejian; Xu Fan; Xie Yuan
- Cinematography: Shang Jin; Zhao Fei
- Production company: Xiaoxiang Film Studio
- Release date: 1988
- Running time: 89 minutes
- Country: China
- Language: Mandarin

Unforgettable Life (Chinese: 特别手术室; pinyin: Te bie shou shu shi) (also known as Special Operating Room and Illegal Lives) is a 1988 Chinese drama film directed by Tian Zhuangzhuang. This was the first film concerning premarital pregnancy in China. It has been reported that this film was banned for 17 years because of its sensitive topic.

== Plot ==
A television station host named Lu Yun has an abortion because she gets pregnant when unmarried, which makes her realize that premarital pregnancy is a very serious social problem. She decides to make a special report on this problem.

== Reception ==
This film reflects the opinions of young women in China who are influenced deeply by sexual openness and reform in the 1980s. It emphasizes the harm to women caused by premarital pregnancy by referring to some serious problems like sexual harassment, incest, extramarital affairs, love triangles, sexlessness, etc.
