= Li Lianying: The Imperial Eunuch =

- Film poster
- Traditional Chinese: 大太監李蓮英
- Simplified Chinese: 大太监李莲英
- Hanyu Pinyin: Dà Tàijiān Lǐ Liányīng
- Directed by: Tian Zhuangzhuang
- Written by: Guo Tianxiang
- Produced by: Alan Chui; Yun Lang
- Starring: Jiang Wen; Liu Xiaoqing; Xu Fan; Zhu Xu
- Cinematography: Zhao Fei
- Music by: Mo Fan
- Production companies: Beijing Film Studio; Skai Film Production Ltd. China Film Co-Production Corporation
- Distributed by: Golden Sun Films Distribution Limited
- Release date: 1991
- Running time: 110 minutes
- Country: China
- Language: Mandarin

Li Lianying: The Imperial Eunuch, also known as The Last Eunuch (albeit inaccurately), is a 1991 Chinese biographical film directed by Tian Zhuangzhuang. It tells the story of Li Lianying, a eunuch who wielded power in the waning days of the Qing Dynasty. The film was entered into the 41st Berlin International Film Festival, where it won an Honourable Mention.

== Cast ==
- Jiang Wen as Li Lianying
- Liu Xiaoqing as Empress Dowager Cixi
- Xu Fan as Consort Zhen
- Zhu Xu as Prince Chun
- Tian Shaojun
- Liu Bin
- Ding Jiali
