= Wei Wei (actress) =

Chinese actress (1922–2023)

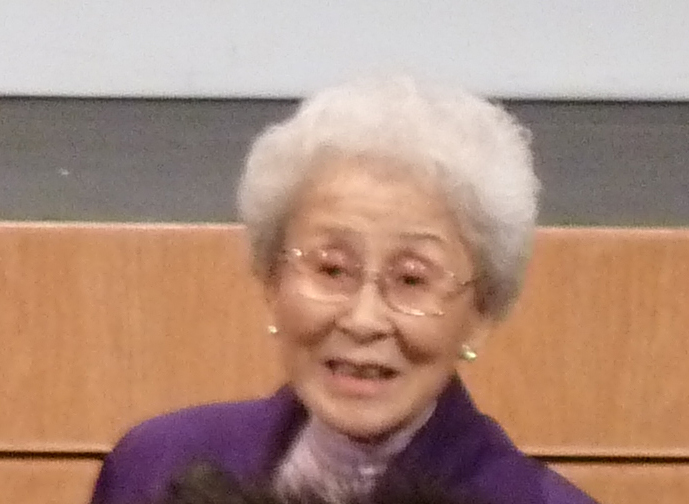
- Wei at the 2010 Hong Kong International Film Festival
- Born: Miao Mengying; 17 May 1922; Zhenjiang, Jiangsu, China
- Died: 2 November 2023 (aged 101); Hong Kong, China
- Occupation: Actress
- Years active: 1942–2023

Wei Wei (Chinese: 韦伟; pinyin: Wéi Wěi; 17 May 1922 – 2 November 2023), born as Miao Mengyin, was a Chinese theatre and film actress.

== Biography ==
Wei Wei began her career in Huang Zuolin and Fei Mu's theatre troupe in 1942. She is best known for her leading role in the classic film Spring in a Small Town (1948), and various other films, active in Chinese cinema from the late-1940s to the 1960s, she had emigrated to Hong Kong in the 1950s, leaving the industry in the 1960s to marry. However, she also continued to work into the late 20th and early 21st century in production's, primarily in Hong Kong. Wei turned 100 in May 2022, and died in Hong Kong on 2 November 2023, at the age of 101.

== Filmography ==
Year	Title	Role
1947	Night Inn	Lin Dai Yu (as Wai Wai)
1948	The Great Reunion	Er Jie
1948	Spring in a Small Town	Zhou Yuwen
1952	Jiang hu er nu	
1954	Zi mei qu	Lu Zishan (Joyce)
1955	Shan dian lian ai	
1955	Yi nian zhi ji	Xiuling
1955	Shui huo zhi jian	
1956	Ji mo de xin	
1957	Tai tai quan qi	
1957	Feng chun you wu	Zhao Pan'er
1959	Spring Reigns Everywhere	Fang Wuan
1960	Cao mu jie bing	
1962	Kinmontô ni kakeru hashi	
1964	Nan nan nu nu	Mrs. Au
1995	I Want to Go on Living	
1996	The Age of Miracles	Auntie Shum
1998	Anna Magdalena	Guest Star
1999	The Truth About Jane and Sam	Jane's Grandmother
2000	And I Hate You So	
2007	Happy Birthday	Mi's Grandmother
2010	Fire of Conscience	Manfred's grandmother
2010	The Drunkard	Old Mrs Lei
2012	The Assassins	Special Appearance

== See also ==
- Cinema of China
