= Hou Yong (cinematographer) =

Chinese filmmaker and cinematographer (born 1960)

- Born: 1960 (age 65–66)
- Occupations: Cinematographer, film director
- Awards: Shanghai-Special Jury Award; 2004 Jasmine Women; Golden Rooster Awards – Best Cinematography; 1987 Sun Yatsen; 1989 Evening Bell; 1997 The Opium War

Chinese name
- Traditional Chinese: 侯詠
- Simplified Chinese: 侯咏
Transcriptions
Standard Mandarin
- Hanyu Pinyin: Hóu Yǒng

Hou Yong (Chinese: 侯咏; born 1960) is a Chinese filmmaker and cinematographer. He is perhaps best known for his collaboration with director Zhang Yimou, though he has worked with many of China's major directors. Like some of Zhang's other cinematographers (notably Lü Yue, whom Hou replaced), Hou has also moved into the directing world. In 2004, he directed Jasmine Women starring Zhang Ziyi.

Hou began his career after graduating from the Beijing Film Academy in 1982 in the same class as Fifth Generation directors Zhang Yimou, Chen Kaige, and Tian Zhuangzhuang. Hou's early career was spent mainly on Fifth Generation projects, notably those of Tian, and Wu Ziniu. By the late 1990s, Hou began collaborating with Zhang Yimou for a series of films during Zhang's realist period.

== Filmography ==
=== As cinematographer ===
Year	English Title	Chinese Title	Director	Notes
1984	September	九月	Tian Zhuangzhuang	
1985	On the Hunting Ground	猎场扎撒	Tian Zhuangzhuang	
1986	The Horse Thief	盗马贼	Tian Zhuangzhuang	With Zhao Fei
1987	Sun Yatsen	孙中山	Ding Yinnan	
1988	Evening Bell	晚钟	Wu Ziniu	
1993	The Blue Kite	蓝风筝	Tian Zhuangzhuang	
1994	The Day the Sun Turned Cold	天国逆子	Yim Ho	
1995	Don't Cry, Nanking	南京大屠杀 南京1937	Wu Ziniu	
1996	The Strangers in Beijing	混在北京	He Qun	
1997	The Opium War	鸦片战争	Xie Jin	
1998	Lani Loa - The Passage	我的血腥婚礼	Sherwood Hu	
1999	Not One Less	一个都不能少	Zhang Yimou	
1999	The Road Home	我的父亲母亲	Zhang Yimou	
2000	Happy Times	幸福时光	Zhang Yimou	
2002	Hero	英雄	Zhang Yimou	With Christopher Doyle
2004	Manhole	我为谁狂	Chen Daming	
2006	Prince of the Himalayas	喜马拉雅王子	Sherwood Hu	

=== As director ===
Year	English Title	Chinese Title	Notes
1991	Sky is Bleeding	天出血	
2004	Jasmine Women	茉莉花开	
2007	The Great Revival	卧薪尝胆	TV series
2008	The One Man Olympics	一个人的奥林匹克	
2021	Monarch Industry	帝凰业	TV series

=== As actor ===
- The Grand Mansion Gate II 大宅门 第二部 (2003 TV series)
