= September (1984 film) =

- Film poster
- Traditional Chinese: 九月
- Simplified Chinese: 九月
- Hanyu Pinyin: Jiǔ yuè
- Directed by: Tian Zhuangzhuang
- Written by: Yan Tingting
- Starring: Jiang Yunhui; Wang Mingzhi
- Cinematography: Hou Yong
- Production company: Kunming Film Studio
- Release date: 1984
- Language: Mandarin

September is a 1984 Chinese film directed by Tian Zhuangzhuang. Though not his first film as director, September is considered Tian's first major feature. The film is also known by the title In September.

== Plot ==
The film tells the story of a young teacher who, during the first seventeen years of the People's Republic of China, approaches the teaching of her students with a humanistic philosophy, which leads to problems with authorities.

== Production ==
September was based on a screenplay by the writer Yan Tingting who was contracted with the Kunming Film Studio. After seeing some of Tian's work (notably 1982's Red Elephant, which Tian had co-directed), Yan sent his screenplay to the director, who at the time was working with Ling Zifeng as an assistant director on the older man's film, The Border Town.

Tian liked the story and particularly its humanistic portrayal of the years in which Tian himself had grown up, but he was immediately turned off by the film's second half, which glorified the Chinese Communist Party. Taking on the project, Tian changed parts of Yan's screenplay, including the ending. These changes, however, were seen by the film's producers as a negative portrayal of the People's Republic's earliest years. As a result, Tian's inserted scenes were cut, leading the director to feel that much of his vision was ultimately compromised.

In contrast to his earlier works, September also marked Tian Zhuangzhuang's first official run-in with Chinese censors, although Chinese television had refused to air his short film, Our Corner, which he co-directed while still in the Beijing Film Academy.
