= House of Flying Daggers =

2004 Chinese-Hong Kong film by Zhang Yimou

- Theatrical release poster
- 十面埋伏
- Directed by: Zhang Yimou
- Written by: Li Feng; Peter Wu; Wang Bin; Zhang Yimou
- Produced by: William Kong; Zhang Yimou
- Starring: Takeshi Kaneshiro; Andy Lau; Zhang Ziyi
- Cinematography: Zhao Xiaoding
- Edited by: Long Cheng
- Music by: Shigeru Umebayashi
- Production companies: Edko Films; China Film Co-Production Corporation; Elite Group Enterprises; Zhang Yimou Studio; Beijing New Picture Films
- Distributed by: Edko Films
- Release dates: 19 May 2004 (Cannes); 15 July 2004 (Hong Kong); 16 July 2004 (China); 3 December 2004 (United States)
- Running time: 119 minutes
- Countries: China; Hong Kong
- Language: Mandarin
- Budget: US$12 million
- Box office: US$92.9 million

House of Flying Daggers (十面埋伏) is a 2004 wuxia film directed by Zhang Yimou, starring Takeshi Kaneshiro, Andy Lau, and Zhang Ziyi. It opened in limited release within the United States on 3 December 2004, in New York City and Los Angeles, and opened on additional screens throughout the country two weeks later. The film grossed $11,050,094 at the United States box office and went on to significantly over-perform in the home video market in the United States.

The film was chosen as China's entry for the Academy Award for Best Foreign Language Film for the year 2004, but was not nominated in that category. It did receive a nomination for Best Cinematography.

== Synopsis ==
In AD 859, as the Tang dynasty declines, several rebel groups emerged. The largest of them is the House of Flying Daggers in Fengtian, who battle the corrupt government. Its members steal from the rich and give to the poor, gaining the locals' support. Two police officers, Liu and Jin, are ordered to kill the group leader within ten days, an impossible task given no one even knows the leader's identity.

They decide to infiltrate the House of Flying Daggers by interrogating Mei, a blind dancer suspected of being the previous leader's daughter. Jin patronises the brothel where Mei works as a dancer and asks for her. He later pretends to be drunk and sexually assaults Mei, whereupon Liu appears and intervenes, arresting Jin for his actions and Mei for indecency. The madame of the brothel requests Liu to free Mei as she is a skilled dancer in her brothel. Liu agrees that he will do so, but only if Mei does well in the "Echo Game." When the game ends, Mei tries to kill Liu to avenge her father's death. Liu defeats Mei and arrests her to extract information about rebel leaders. Pretending to be a rebel sympathiser, Jin breaks Mei out of the jailhouse, gaining her trust. The two travel to the Flying Dagger headquarters, with Liu trailing behind with reinforcements. Slowly, Mei and Jin fall in love.

To enhance the deception, Liu and his policemen pretend to ambush the pair. The two escape but they are subsequently ambushed by more imperial soldiers, who are unaware that Jin is on their side. At a secret meeting, Liu explains to Jin that the military general has got involved after he reported to him about Mei, and he wants Jin and Mei dead. Jin is shocked and Liu sympathises with him. Jin "quits" his mission of seducing Mei but follows her of his own volition. After Jin saves Mei from the soldiers, Mei initiates intimacy with Jin but Jin refuses, as he is disturbed by the recent events.

A few days later, Jin and Mei are attacked again in a bamboo forest and almost killed, before the House of Flying Daggers saves them and takes them to their headquarters. Mei is revealed to have been faking her blindness and is not the former leader's daughter. Furthermore, she is engaged to Liu, who turns out to be the Flying Daggers' mole within the police. The Flying Daggers planned to engage the military and lure the general and his army to them. The madame of the brothel was part of the Flying Daggers and had assisted in the trap. Liu, who pretended to be captured by the Flying Daggers, is now released and allowed to meet Mei alone. The meeting starts with a blindfolded Liu performing a version of the "Echo Game" with his daggers, with Mei as the master. While reminiscing about their past, Liu attempts to make advances on Mei but is rejected by her, as she has fallen in love with Jin. Liu is heartbroken, disappointed that Mei had fallen in love with Jin after three days while he had spent three years undercover. Liu attempts to rape Mei, but is interrupted by their superior Nia, who gives them new assignments. Mei is ordered to execute Jin but frees him instead. Mei refuses to leave with Jin but chases after him later. Liu ambushes Mei and wounds her fatally. Jin returns, seeking Mei, and finds her wounded. He seeks to avenge Mei by killing Liu. Liu blames Jin for falling in love with Mei, leading to the current circumstances, and they fight.

Evenly matched, Liu and Jin fight, leaving both badly wounded. As Liu attempts to kill Jin, Mei intervenes, threatening Liu with his own dagger, which is lodged in her body. Jin pleads with Mei to save herself. While the standoff continues, Liu pretends to throw his dagger at Jin, intending to die by Mei's dagger while sparing Jin. However, Mei pulls out the dagger lodged in her body and attempts to use it to intercept Liu's dagger in flight. Suffering from heavy blood loss, Mei dies while the two men survive. Liu leaves the scene while Jin cries over Mei's body.

== Cast ==
- Takeshi Kaneshiro as Captain Jin
- Andy Lau as Captain Liu
- Zhang Ziyi as Mei

== Production ==
Anita Mui was originally cast for a major role but eventually declined due to her failing health before any of her scenes were filmed. Mui died of cervical cancer shortly after. After her death on 30 December 2003, director Zhang Yimou decided to alter the script rather than recast her. The film is dedicated to her memory.

To prepare for her role, Zhang Ziyi lived for two months with a blind girl who had lost her sight at the age of 12 because of a brain tumor. Takeshi Kaneshiro injured his leg when he went horseback riding. As a result, Zhang Yimou had Kaneshiro spend two scenes sitting or kneeling down to alleviate the pain, as stated in Zhang Yimou's audio commentary.

Most of the film was shot in Ukraine's Hutsul Region National Park, such as the scenes in the snow or birch forests. The cast and production team spent 70 days on location from September to October 2003, and were largely based in Kosiv. The notable bamboo forest sequences were filmed in China. However, due to the early snowfall, the filmmakers opted to alter the script and certain sequences, rather than wait for the snow to thaw, as the leaves were still on the trees. Zhang Yimou later stated that despite the unpredictable weather forcing the alterations, he had achieved the desired effect in the scenery, and was happy with the final result.

Like its predecessor Hero, House of Flying Daggers uses wuxing colour theory, in both a deliberate and ironic manner.

== Literary origins ==
The film features the theme of a beautiful woman who brings woe to two men. This theme is borrowed from a famous poem written by the Han dynasty poet Li Yannian (李延年):

北(běi) 方(fāng) 有(yǒu) 佳(jiā) 人(rén)， 絕(jué) 世(shì) 而(ér) 獨(dú) 立(lì)。 一(yí) 顧(gù) 傾(qīng) 人(rén) 城(chéng)， 再(zài) 顧(gù) 傾(qīng) 人(rén) 國(guó)。 寧(nìng) 不(bù) 知(zhī) 傾(qīng) 城(chéng) 與(yǔ) 傾(qīng) 國(guó)。 佳(jiā) 人(rén) 難(nán) 再(zài) 得(dé)。

Traditional Chinese	Simplified Chinese
北方有佳人，絕世而獨立。 一顧傾人城，再顧傾人國。 寧不知傾城與傾國。 佳人難再得。	北方有佳人，绝世而独立。 一顾倾人城，再顾倾人国。 宁不知倾城与倾国。 佳人难再得。
Pinyin transcription	English translation
Běifāng yǒu jiārén, juéshì ér dúlì. Yí gù qīng rén chéng, zài gù qīng rén guó. Nǐng bù zhī qīng chéng yǔ qīng guó. Jiārén nán zài dé.	In the north there is a beauty; peerless and independent. A glance from her will overthrow a city; another glance will overthrow a nation. One would rather not know whether it will be a city or a nation that will be overthrown. As it would be difficult to behold such a beauty again.

== Release ==
=== Box office ===
House of Flying Daggers opened in North America on 3 December 2004 in 15 theatres. It grossed US$397,472 ($26,498 per screen) in its opening weekend. The film's total North American gross is $11,050,094. Afterwards, the film went on to earn at least 50% more in the United States home video market than at the theatrical box office.

The film made an additional $81,751,003 elsewhere in the world, bringing its total worldwide box-office gross to $92,801,097. It was also the third-highest-grossing foreign-language film in the North American market in 2004.

=== Critical reception ===
House of Flying Daggers debuted in May at the 2004 Cannes Film Festival to an enthusiastic reception. The film reportedly received a 20-minute standing ovation at its Cannes Film Festival premiere.

At film review aggregation website Metacritic, the film received an average score of 89 out of 100, based on 37 reviews. Rotten Tomatoes gives the film a score of 87%, based on reviews from 171 critics, and an average rating of 7.7/10. The website's critical consensus states: "The visual splendor of the movie makes up for the weak story". Metacritic also ranked the film at the end of the year as the fifth-best reviewed film of 2004.

Phil Hall of Film Threat wrote: "Quite simply, House of Flying Daggers is a film that sets several new standards for production and entertainment values. It is a wild riot of color, music, passion, action, mystery, pure old-fashioned thrills, and even dancing. With an endless supply of imagination and a kinetic force of nature in its amazing star Zhang Ziyi, House of Flying Daggers cuts all other films to shreds." Desson Thomas of The Washington Post praised the director Zhang Yimou's use of color in the film as "simply the best in the world", and commented that: "the slow-motion trajectory of a small bean, hurled from a police captain's hand, is a spectacular thing. It's a stunning, moving image, like a hummingbird caught in action." While Kevin Thomas of the Los Angeles Times praised the film by stating: "House of Flying Daggers finds the great Chinese director at his most romantic in this thrilling martial arts epic that involves a conflict between love and duty carried out to its fullest expression."

A. O. Scott of The New York Times described the film as: "A gorgeous entertainment, a feast of blood, passion, and silk brocade." The review also stated: "House of Flying Daggers for all its fire and beauty, may leave you a bit cold in the end." Roger Ebert of the Chicago Sun Times gave the film four out of four stars and states: "Forget about the plot, the characters, the intrigue, which are all splendid in House of Flying Daggers, and focus just on the visuals"; Ebert also stated: "the film is so good to look at and listen to that, as with some operas, the story is almost beside the point, serving primarily to get us from one spectacular scene to another." House of Flying Daggers was placed at number 93 on Slant's best films of the 2000s, and ranked number 77 in Empire's "The 100 Best Films Of World Cinema" in 2010.

In 2024, Looper ranked it number 33 on its list of the "50 Best PG-13 Movies of All Time," writing: "A film bursting with visual imagination, House of Flying Daggers is akin to a crash course in the qualities that define Zhang's radiant vision as a filmmaker."

=== Home media ===
In the United Kingdom, the film was watched by 1.7 million viewers on Channel 4 in 2007, making it the year's most-watched foreign-language film on British television. It was later watched by 600,000 viewers on Channel 4 in 2009, again making it the year's most-watched foreign-language film on Channel 4. Combined, the film drew a 2.3 million UK viewership on Channel 4 in 2007 and 2009.

=== Accolades ===
Won

- Boston Film Critics
  - Best Cinematography (Zhao Xiaoding)
  - Best Director (Yimou Zhang)
  - Best Foreign Language Film (China/Hong Kong)
- Los Angeles Film Critics
  - Best Foreign Language Film (China/Hong Kong)
- Motion Picture Sound Editors
  - Best Sound Editing in Foreign Features
- National Board of Review
  - Outstanding Production Design
- National Society of Film Critics
  - Best Director (Yimou Zhang)
  - Best Cinematography (Zhao Xiaoding)
- Satellite Awards
  - Best Cinematography (Zhao Xiaoding)
  - Best Visual Effects

Nominations

- 24th Hong Kong Film Awards
  - Best Asian Film
- Academy Awards
  - Best Cinematography (Zhao Xiaoding)
- Academy of Science Fiction, Fantasy and Horror Films
  - Best Actress (Zhang Ziyi)
  - Best Costumes (Emi Wada)
  - Best Director (Zhang Yimou)
  - Best Fantasy Film
- BAFTA Awards
  - Best Achievement in Special Visual Effects (Angie Lam, Andy Brown, Kirsty Millar, and Luke Hetherington)
  - Best Cinematography (Zhao Xiaoding)
  - Best Costume Design (Emi Wada)
  - Best Editing (Long Cheng)
  - Best Film not in the English Language (William Kong and Zhang Yimou)
  - Best Make Up/Hair (Lee-na Kwan, Xiaohai Yang and Siu-Mui Chau)
  - Best Performance by an Actress in a Leading Role (Zhang Ziyi)
  - Best Production Design (Huo Tingxiao)
  - Best Sound (Tao Jing and Roger Savage)
- Golden Eagle Awards
  - Best Foreign Language Film
- London Film Critics Circle
  - Film of the Year
  - Director of the Year (Zhang Yimou)
  - Foreign language film of the year
- Satellite Awards
  - Best Art Direction/Production Design (Zhong Han)
  - Best Costume Design (Emi Wada)
  - Best Film Editing (Long Cheng)
  - Best Motion Picture – Foreign Film (China)
  - Best Sound (Editing and Mixing) (Jing Tao)
- Broadcast Film Critics Association Awards
  - Best Foreign-Language Film
- Online Film Critics Society Awards
  - Best Cinematography (Xiaoding Zhao)
  - Best Editing (Long Cheng)
  - Best Foreign Language Film (China)
- European Film Awards
  - Best Non-European Film – Prix Screen International

== Soundtrack ==
House of Flying Daggers

Soundtrack album by Shigeru Umebayashi
- Released: 15 July 2004 (Hong Kong); 7 December 2004 (United States)
- Genres: Stage & Screen Classical
- Length: 49:37
- Labels: Edko (Hong Kong); Sony (United States)
- Producer: Shigeru Umebayashi

The soundtrack was produced and created by Shigeru Umebayashi, featuring vocals by Zhang Ziyi and Kathleen Battle. It was released in Hong Kong on 15 July 2004 by the film's production company and distributor Edko Films. The US version was released by Sony Music Entertainment on 7 December 2004.

1. "Opening Title" – 0:58
2. "Beauty Song" (佳人曲) – 2:32 (Zhang Ziyi)
3. "The Echo Game" – 1:17
4. The Peonyhouse – 1:22
5. "Battle in the Forest" – 3:26
6. "Taking Her Hand" – 1:14
7. "Leo's Eyes" – 1:51
8. "Lovers-Flower Garden" – 2:19
9. "No Way Out" – 3:59
10. "Lovers" – 1:54
11. "Farewell No. 1" – 2:42
12. "Bamboo Forest" – 2:36
13. "Ambush in Ten Directions" (十面埋伏) – 2:01
14. "Leo's Theme" – 2:36
15. "Mei and Leo" – 3:06
16. "The House of Flying Daggers" – 1:27
17. "Lovers-Mei and Jin" – 4:21
18. "Farewell No. 2" – 2:49
19. "Until The End " – 2:55
20. "Title Song Lovers" – 4:12 (Kathleen Battle)

== See also ==
- List of historical drama films of Asia
