= The Blue Kite =

1993 Chinese-Hong Kong film by Tian Zhuangzhuang

- Release poster
- Traditional Chinese: 藍風箏
- Simplified Chinese: 蓝风筝
- Hanyu Pinyin: Lán fēngzheng
- Directed by: Tian Zhuangzhuang
- Written by: Mao Xiao
- Produced by: Yongping Chen; Guiping Luo
- Starring: Lü Liping; Pu Quanxin; Chen Xiaoman; Li Xuejian; Guo Baochang
- Cinematography: Hou Yong
- Edited by: Qian Lengleng
- Music by: Otomo Yoshihide
- Production companies: Beijing Film Studio; Longwick Film
- Distributed by: Kino International
- Release date: 12 September 1993 (Toronto)
- Running time: 140 minutes
- Countries: China; Hong Kong
- Language: Mandarin

The Blue Kite (simplified Chinese: 蓝风筝; traditional Chinese: 藍風箏; pinyin: Lán fēngzheng) is a 1993 drama film directed by Tian Zhuangzhuang. Though banned by the Chinese government upon its completion (along with a ten-year ban on filmmaking imposed on Tian), the film soon found a receptive international audience. Along with Zhang Yimou's To Live and Chen Kaige's Farewell My Concubine, The Blue Kite serves as one of the quintessential examples of China's Fifth Generation filmmaking, and in particular reveals the impact the various political movements, including Anti-Rightist Movement and Cultural Revolution, had upon directors who grew up in the 1950s and 1960s.

The film won the Grand Prix at the Tokyo International Film Festival, and Best Film at the Hawaii International Film Festival, both in 1993.

== Plot ==
The story is told from the perspective of a young boy (铁头, Tietou, literally meaning 'iron head') growing up in the 1950s and 1960s in Beijing. Three episodes – Hundred Flowers Campaign, the Great Leap Forward and the Cultural Revolution – show the family members evolving, e.g. from the real father, the "loving patriarch," to the protective but unemotional stepfather.

=== Father ===
The first episode, entitled "Father," begins with a wedding between Lin Shaolong and Chen Shujuan in the early 1950s, shortly after the Communist victory. The wedding draws the whole neighborhood, a happy moment that will soon serve as a stark contrast with the years to come.

The couple soon give birth to a son, Tietou, meaning "iron head." In these early years Tietou's father creates for him a blue kite, a symbol that will remain throughout the film as a sign of better days. The father meanwhile, who works in a library, unbeknown to him, submitted "advice" through a well-meaning colleague to the Party as per the Hundred Flowers Campaign. Another colleague, Li, also named in this document, was coerced into giving statements against Lin.

Shaolong's workplace has convened a meeting on the issue of who they will have to report to the Communist Party as a "rightist" in order to meet Mao's quota. The father quickly leaves for the bathroom. When he returns, all eyes are on him; it is clear who his colleagues have selected. Realizing his terrible mistake of leaving, the father briefly mistreats his son. Tietou, just a small boy, is still bitter when his father is sent to a work camp. Shujuan's youngest brother was also sent to a reeducation camp. The chapter ends when Tietou's mother receives a letter; his father has been killed by a falling tree.

=== Uncle ===
The second episode of the film is entitled "Uncle" and deals with Tietou's mother's courtship by Li, her husband's former colleague, and subsequent remarriage to "Uncle" Li. Li is haunted by his role in sending his friend to the work camp which resulted in Lin's death. Li spends every moment helping out the mother and child, and every penny in easing their distress in the rapidly declining society.

Uncle Li cares for the boy's material needs and desires but it soon grows clear that his health is failing. Soon, malnutrition during the Great Leap Forward takes its toll and Li dies due to his poor health.

=== Stepfather ===
No wedding ceremony, no feelings shown at all. This marriage is just to save the mother and son from poverty, and to give them protection. They move in with the stepfather (Lao Wu).

Meanwhile, the Cultural Revolution is about to break forth. The stepfather, a prominent party member about to be disgraced, worries about saving his wife and stepson and does what he can to provide a safe life for them before it is too late. As he's being lifted out of his home by the rebelling Red Guards. The last scenes are of Tietou's mother being dragged away by Red Guards, who also beat Tietou. At the end, the boy is lying on the ground, bloodied. In a voice-over, he tells of his stepfather's death from a heart attack; his mother is sent to the work camps, but his own fate is left unknown. The camera pans out from his bruised body as he lies there looking up to see a broken blue kite hanging in the tree.

== Cast ==
- Chen Xiaoman (as teenage Tietou; infant Tietou played by Tian Yi, child Tietou by Zhang Wenyao)
- Lü Liping as Chen Shujuan, Tietou’s mother and a schoolteacher
- Pu Cunxin as Lin Shaolong, Tietou’s biological father and a librarian
- Li Xuejian as Li Guodong (“Uncle” Li), Shujuan’s second husband and former colleague of Shaolong
- Guo Baochang as Lao Wu, Shujuan’s third husband and a minor Communist Party official

== Themes ==
"I finished shooting The Blue Kite in 1992. But while I was involved in post-production, several official organizations involved with China's film industry screened the film. They decided that it had a problem concerning its political 'leanings,' and prevented its completion. The fact that it can appear today seems like a miracle... The stories in the film are real, and they are related with total sincerity. What worries me is that it is precisely a fear of reality and sincerity that has led to the ban on such stories being told."

— Director Tian Zhuangzhuang

The film shows a series of patriarchal figures in Tietou's life. Each of the fathers somehow offends the party, and each fails to provide a happy life for his family. Many symbols are used to show that the party is usurping the father, the mother and the family itself. The more the party takes control, the less emotions are shown and the more depressed the characters are. The party is also shown reaching out for those who seek to undermine it and no one can escape: not the student, not the ordinary librarian, and not even the soldier who fought for those very ideals.

== Reception ==
On the review aggregator website Rotten Tomatoes, 100% of 11 critics' reviews are positive, with an average rating of 8/10. Roger Ebert gave the film 4/4 stars and included it in his Great Movies collection. He wrote that it is “a profoundly political film, but achieves its purpose by indirection. It is not so much about China as about human nature.” He praised the film's “resolutely human focus.” Jonathan Rosenbaum went further, calling it a “masterpiece” and drawing attention to how it weaves together “mordant tragicomedy of contemporary Chinese history with the morality and hopeful endurance of the mother.”

Kenneth Turan of the Los Angeles Times called the film “of all the remarkable films to have come out of China over the past few years... the most authentic, the most accessible and, finally, the most powerful.” He also singled out its “daring politically and quietly shattering emotionally” quality. Where Fifth Generation directors, such as Chen Kaige and Zhang Yimou, leaned toward the theatrical, Turan saw Tian Zhuangzhuang taking a quieter, more naturalistic path.

Scholar Xudong Zhang situated The Blue Kite within post-Tiananmen Chinese cinema’s broader effort to reclaim national memory through personal and familial suffering. In Zhang's reading, the film builds “a counternarrative of national trauma and traumatized individual life” through what he called a “visual ontology or mythology of the present.” Zhang further stated that the film treats the rhythms of everyday courtyard life as a kind of stable backdrop against which political upheaval crashes.

The film showed up on several year-end best lists, including those of Turan and Ebert.

== Banned in mainland China ==
Because of its content, it was banned in mainland China by the government.

== Year-end lists ==
- 2nd – Yardena Arar, Los Angeles Daily News
- 6th – Kenneth Turan, Los Angeles Times
- 7th – Roger Ebert, Chicago Sun Times
- Top 10 (not ranked) – Howie Movshovitz, The Denver Post
- Honorable mention – William Arnold, Seattle Post-Intelligencer

== Awards ==
- Hawaii International Film Festival, 1993
  - Best Feature Film
- Tokyo International Film Festival, 1993
  - Grand Prix
  - Best Actress Award – Lü Liping
- Independent Spirit Awards, 1995
  - Best Foreign Film nomination

== See also ==
- List of banned films
- Hibiscus Town — another Cultural Revolution drama, made several years prior to The Blue Kite.
- To Live, a 1994 Chinese film covering similar political movements as The Blue Kite.
- Farewell My Concubine, a 1993 Chinese-Hong Kong film covering similar political movements as The Blue Kite.
