= Spring in a Small Town =

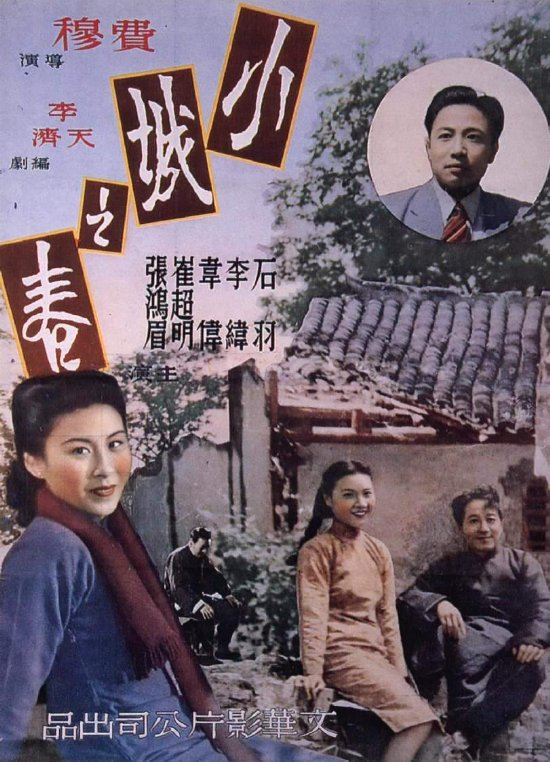
- Film poster
- Chinese: 小城之春
- Hanyu Pinyin: Xiǎochéng zhī chūn
- Directed by: Fei Mu
- Written by: Li Tianji
- Starring: Wei Wei; Shi Yu; Li Wei
- Cinematography: Li Shengwei
- Edited by: Wei Chunbao; Xu Ming
- Music by: Huang Yijun
- Production company: Wenhua Film Company
- Distributed by: United States (DVD): Cinema Epoch
- Release date: 1948
- Running time: 93 minutes
- Country: China
- Language: Mandarin

Spring in a Small Town is a 1948 black-and-white Chinese film, written by Li Tianji (Chinese: 李天濟; pinyin: Lǐ Tiānjì) and directed by Fei Mu, a director known for his empathetic portrayal of women. It was produced and funded by Wenhua Film Company, whose great financial deficit at the time led it to produce Spring in a Small Town on a smaller budget with a minimalist plot and setting. The film cast only five characters, and it focuses on the struggles of a husband and wife, and the ensuing turmoil when Zhang Zhichen, Liyan's former classmate and, ironically, Yuwen's former lover, pays an unplanned visit to their residence.

The original print of the film is now kept in the China Film Archive. In 2005, at the Hong Kong Film Awards to mark a century of Chinese films, Spring in a Small Town was voted the best Chinese film ever made.

== Plot ==
The film takes place in a ruined family compound in a small town in the Jiangnan region after the Sino-Japanese War, and it tells the story of the once-prosperous Dai family. The film opens with Yuwen (Wei Wei) walking alone along the ruins of the city wall, narrating the slow-paced, circular nature of her life. Her husband Liyan (Shi Yu) is ill and wallows in the miserable reality of his family's loss. Due to his illness and depression, his marriage to Yuwen has long been loveless, though both remain dutiful spouses to each other. Liyan spends his days in the courtyard expressing nostalgia for a better time. Meanwhile, Liyan's young teenage sister Xiu (Zhang Hongmei), too young to remember the past, stays cheerful and playful in the ruins of their home. Lao Huang (Cui Chaoming) is an old servant of the Dai family who faithfully remains with the family.

The Dai family still manages to live in an uneventful peace, but this is suddenly challenged by an unexpected visit from Liyan's childhood friend Zhang Zhichen (Li Wei), a doctor from Shanghai who previously had a relationship with Yuwen. Yuwen is conflicted between her love for Zhichen and her loyalty to her husband. During Zhichen's first evening at the home, Yuwen rekindles their love, visiting him and sending him some bedding and a thermos to show her concern. The next day, Liyan, Yuwen, Zhichen, and Xiu spend the day together walking and boating.

Liyan and Zhichen talk later in the day and Liyan expresses love for his wife but feels unworthy of her. Liyan suggests that things would be better if Yuwen married Zhichen, making Zhichen feel guilty. Xiu, having just turned sixteen years old, develops romantic feelings for Zhichen, who himself is conflicted between his love for Yuwen and his loyalty to Liyan. As the film progresses, Liyan and Xiu begin to suspect that Zhichen and Yuwen have strong feelings for one another.

One night, Zhichen, Liyan, Yuwen, and Xiu drink and play games together. Liyan notices happiness in Yuwen that he has not seen in a while, but it is only because of her interaction with Zhichen. In a conversation with Yuwen shortly after, Liyan expresses his shame for being an inadequate husband, and he wishes out loud that Yuwen had married Zhichen instead. As Yuwen and Zhichen struggle between overcoming or succumbing to their passion for each other, Liyan attempts suicide by taking an overdose of sleeping pills. Old Huang finds Liyan passed out on his bed, and gathers everyone else. Liyan survives, but the attempted suicide convinces Zhichen to leave and Yuwen to stay in the relationship with her husband. In the final sequence of the film, Dai Xiu and Old Huang walk Zhichen to the train station, while Yuwen is on the wall with Liyan and points into the horizon.

== Cast ==
- Wei Wei (韋偉) as Zhou Yuwen (周玉紋 Zhōu Yùwén), the heroine;
- Yu Shi (石羽) as Dai Liyan (戴禮言 Dài Lǐyán), Yuwen's husband;
- Li Wei as Zhang Zhichen (章志忱 Zhāng Zhìchén), Dai Liyan's childhood friend and Yuwen's former lover
- Cui Chaoming as Lao Huang (老黃 lǎo Huáng), Dai and Yuwen's loyal servant;
- Zhang Hongmei as Dai Xiu (戴秀 Dài Xiù), Dai Liyan's young sister.

== Background ==
Spring in a Small Town takes place in the aftermath of the Second Sino-Japanese War. During the war, the Japanese bombed numerous Chinese cities, causing enormous casualties and damage, in which around 20 million people died. The war also left the Nationalist Party in a precarious position, while the Communist Party gained more influence. The film was produced during the Chinese Civil War. Fei Mu at this time finished the film in only three months by not using scripts and cutting the screenplay by two-thirds. At the end of the film, Fei Mu and screenwriter Li Tianjin considered using a screenplay in which Zhichen and Yuwen joined the revolution together—a kind of finale of a classic left-wing movie since it is an easy solution. However, they ended up deciding not to use this ending. Wei Wei, to prepare for her eventual iconic role, was told to underact her emotions. The Peking Opera actor Mei Lanfang was instructed to be her model. The war between the Nationalists and the Communists is referenced ever so slightly in the film when Liyan scoffs at the notion that they are living in peaceful times despite the end of the Sino-Japanese conflict.

Spring in a Small Town applied some analogies of ancient poetry to the scenes and images in the film, like the symbols of the moonlight, candle and orchid. Also, based on the Second Sino-Japanese War background and ruined walls image, the theme of Du Fu's poem "Chunwang" ("Spring Prospect") was invoked in this film:

The nation shattered, mountains and river remain.
City in spring, grass, and trees burgeoning.
Feeling the times, blossoms draw tears.
Hating separation, birds alarm the heart.
Beacon fires three months in succession, a letter from home worth ten thousand in gold.
White hairs, fewer for the scratching, soon too few to hold a hairpin up.

— "Chunwang" ("Spring Prospect")

The poem was written after An Lushan Rebellion in 757 CE, which almost toppled the Tang dynasty and is often seen as the beginning of the Tang dynasty's long decline. It expresses Du Fu's hatred of war and his sympathy for the people.

=== Creation ===
In 1947, Wu Zuguang pushed script writer Li Tianji to write a screenplay, telling him to start with "Spring in a Small Town", which was originally titled "Bitter Love" but was eventually renamed "Lost Love". Li Tianji presented the script for "Spring in a Small Town" to the directors of Cathay (Guotai) Film Company and Datong Film Company after completing it, but they were not interested. After Wu Zuguang requested Cao Yu give the script to Wenhua’s director, Cao Yu agreed. Fei Mu did not ask for the script until more than a year had passed. Then the film Spring in a Small Town was released a half-year later. The film did, however, make a few changes from the original screenplay including: removing an old Chinese doctor character, removing some emotional scenes between Dai Xiu and Zhichen, and adding more romantic drama between Zhichen and Yuwen.

== Themes ==
This film represents the physical and psychological trauma for people and country after the war between China and Japan. Even though the Japanese forces surrendered, China was largely in ruins, having a large effect on its people in the post-war period. The city wall in the film is an important motif, as its dilapidated state reflects not only the physical destruction of the war, but also the general post-war depression of the people; the latter is personified by the male protagonist, Dai Liyan, who suffers from a psychosomatic illness as he struggles to cope with the destruction and decline of his estate following the war. The recurring scene of the broken city wall shown in the film reminds the audience about the destruction caused by the war. This environment enhances the mood of a solitary obscure town and broken homes, complemented by low music and slow rhythm. There are no other characters in addition to the five characters, which creates a "tragic and lonely" atmosphere in the film.

Spring in a Small Town also explores Confucian values through the romantic struggles between the characters Yuwen and Zhichen. According to Susan Daruvala, the film acknowledges instincts and emotions as integral parts of a love relationship, yet they must be directed by wisdom or intelligence. Despite the tempting passion in the relationship between Yuwen and Zhichen, it, ultimately, does not materialize, hence highlighting its unfeasibility within the framework of Confucian values: wisdom, intelligence, and loyalty. In addition, the ideology fa hu qing, zhi hu li (發乎情止乎禮) appears in the film; it means "you may talk about love, but don't cross beyond the limits of etiquette." Inoue and Choe state that this phrase plays a key part to "[rationalizing] the impasse of the situation" between Yuwen, Zhichen and Liyan, and summarizes the relationship between males and females in China during that time.

The film could be regarded as a feminist film, considering Yuwen's voice-over narration is "unapologetic and frank in her description of her relationship with her husband." Her blatant lack of guilt not only deviates from traditional norms, but the film, which appears to favor her subjectivity, is also inconsistent with other films produced at the time.

== Lyricism ==
Spring in a Small Town starts with a voice narration of the female protagonist, Yuwen. Her voice-over tells the tedious routines of her daily life. She describes the plot as it is shown to the audience, and she adds her personal feelings into her narration. Her voice-over lasts for about 18 minutes until she and Zhichen physically meet in the film for the first time after their separation caused by the war. Yuwen's narration is often regarded as highly artistic and unique by critics. Well-respected Hong Kong poet Leung Ping-kwan commented on the artistry and lyricism in the film. He argues that Yuwen's voice is more than just simple narration; it is rather a lyrical film form which is characteristic of modern literary ideology. According to Leung, the voice-over is the key to establishing the film's exceptional sense of lyricism, as well as Fei Mu's personal interpretation of ruination and his poetic aesthetics. The author also notes that instead of describing what happened, the narration focuses more on the protagonist's inner emotional change and struggle.

According to Jie Li, Yuwen's voice-over accompanied by her personal subjective point of view shots connects the dreary city walls, her husband's pessimism and the ruins in the family compound. In addition, the amble cinematography in the film resonates with Du Fu's famous poem "Spring Gazing", which was written during the An Lushan Rebellion. The voice of Yuwen is the bridge that associates the dull, lifeless city ruins to the intimate household, where the characters disclose their longing for passion and closure.

== Soundtrack ==
At the time of the film's production, the Chinese film recording process was mainly optical sound recording, while foreign countries of the same period had already adopted magnetic sound recording; this meant that the film's audio was negatively affected by the relatively older recording technology. The film uses the mono recording technique, which means the film's sound, music and dialogue are mixed in a single channel. This gives the audience the impression that all the sounds are coming from the same direction.

Unlike modern films that use pre-recording and live playback, Fei Mu had the actors sing and record the songs live. In addition, because of the lack of technology and equipment at that time, there were no conditions for technical processing of the recording. There are two songs in the film: "That Faraway Place" sung by Zhang Hongmei and Shi Yu, and "Lovely Little Rose", first verse sung by Zhang Hongmei in the earlier part of the film, and second verse sung by Li Wei in the latter part. Sound recording credited to Miao Zhenyu and music credited to Huang Yijun.

== Reception ==
While today it is recognized as a classic, upon its initial release, the film was much more controversial. Spring in a Small Town, unlike its leftist predecessors of the 1930s, focused on a more intimate affair with no clear antagonists except for time/circumstance and with only tangential references to the politics of the day. Because of this apparent lack of "political" grounding, Spring in a Small Town was rejected by the Communist Party back then as rightist and reactionary, and was ignored following the Communist victory in the Chinese Civil War in 1949. This criticism was connected to socialist realist cultural policy introduced by the Soviet Union in the 1930s.

The film was only able to find its audience and had a resurgence in popularity after the China Film Archive made a new print in the early 1980s. Today, it is considered one of the classic masterworks in Chinese film history. In 2011, the film was listed as one of the 100 best Chinese films by the Taipei Golden Horse Film Festival Executive Committee. In 2005, the Hong Kong Film Awards Association named it the greatest Chinese film ever made. Sixth Generation film director Wang Chao also declared the film to be one of his favourites and Fei Mu the director he most admired. In 2002, the film was remade by Tian Zhuangzhuang as Springtime in a Small Town.

On the review aggregator website Rotten Tomatoes, 100% of 16 critics' reviews are positive, with an average rating of 9.7/10.

== Translations ==
Spring in a Small Town is available with English subtitles translated by Professor Christopher Rea on YouTube. Additionally, for more information on the film, Professor Christopher Rea's website has video lectures that break down the film. Other subtitled versions are available commercially from the British Film Institute and Cinema Epoch.

== Remake and theatrical adaptation ==
In 2002, a remake film for Spring in a Small Town called Springtime in a Small Town was directed by Tian Zhuangzhuang. The remake received accolades and recognition in the Venice Film Festival and rave reviews, although it was criticized for removing Yuwen's voice over.

Li Liuyi, one of the mainland's leading theatre directors, together with actors from the Beijing People's Art Theatre and the China National Theatre, produced the world premiere of "Spring in a Small Town" on April 10, 2015. The play is adapted from the classic film in 1948 with the same names and lines.

== Accolades ==
List of Accolades
Award / Film Festival	Category	Recipient(s)	Result
Shanghai Film Critics Awards 2005	Top 22 Films of Chinese Cinema in Shanghai Film Critics Award	Spring in a Small Town	Won
Hong Kong Film Awards 2005	Best 100 Chinese Motion Pictures (#1)	Spring in a Small Town	Won
