= Maggie Q =

American actress (born 1979)

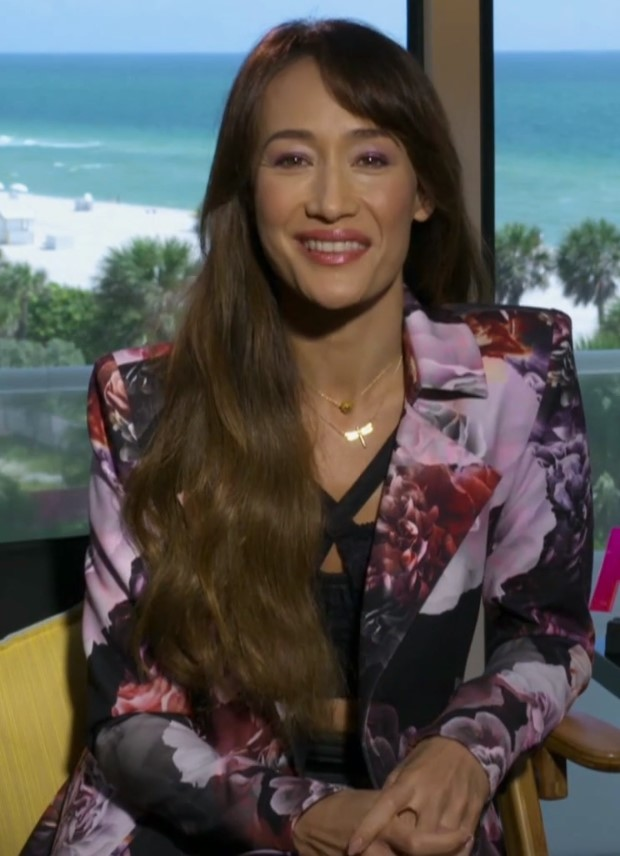
- Q in 2021
- Born: Margaret Denise Quigley; May 22, 1979 (age 47); Honolulu, Hawaii, U.S.
- Occupation: Actress
- Years active: 1998–present
- Spouse: Curtis Macnguyen (m. 2025)

Margaret Denise Quigley (born May 22, 1979), known professionally as Maggie Q, is an American actress. She began her professional career in Hong Kong, with starring roles in the action films Gen-Y Cops (2000) and Naked Weapon (2002), before appearing in the American productions Mission: Impossible III (2006), Live Free or Die Hard (2007), Priest (2011) and The Protégé (2021). She portrayed Tori Wu in the dystopian science-fiction action film Divergent (2014), and reprised her role in the sequels, Insurgent (2015) and Allegiant (2016). Q starred in the title role on the CW action-thriller series Nikita (2010–2013), and also had a main role as FBI special agent Hannah Wells in the ABC/Netflix political thriller series Designated Survivor (2016–2019). She provided the voice of Wonder Woman on the animated series Young Justice (2012–2019). In 2025, Q began starring in the lead role of Detective Renée Ballard on the Prime Video series Ballard, a spinoff of the television series Bosch: Legacy.

== Early life and education ==
Margaret Denise Quigley was born and raised in Honolulu, Hawaii. Her mother is Vietnamese and her father is American of Polish and Irish descent. Her parents met while her father was serving in Vietnam during the Vietnam War. She has four siblings and was raised Catholic. She became a practitioner of Buddhism.

She attended Mililani Uka Elementary School and Wheeler Intermediate School. At Mililani High School, she was on the cross country, track and field, and swim teams. She won the student title of "Best Body" senior year, and graduated in 1997. She won an athletics scholarship to a private university and intended to study veterinary science; however, her family was unable to assist her financially. She left Hawaii at the end of one school year in hopes of earning enough money to resume at the beginning of the next one.

== Career ==
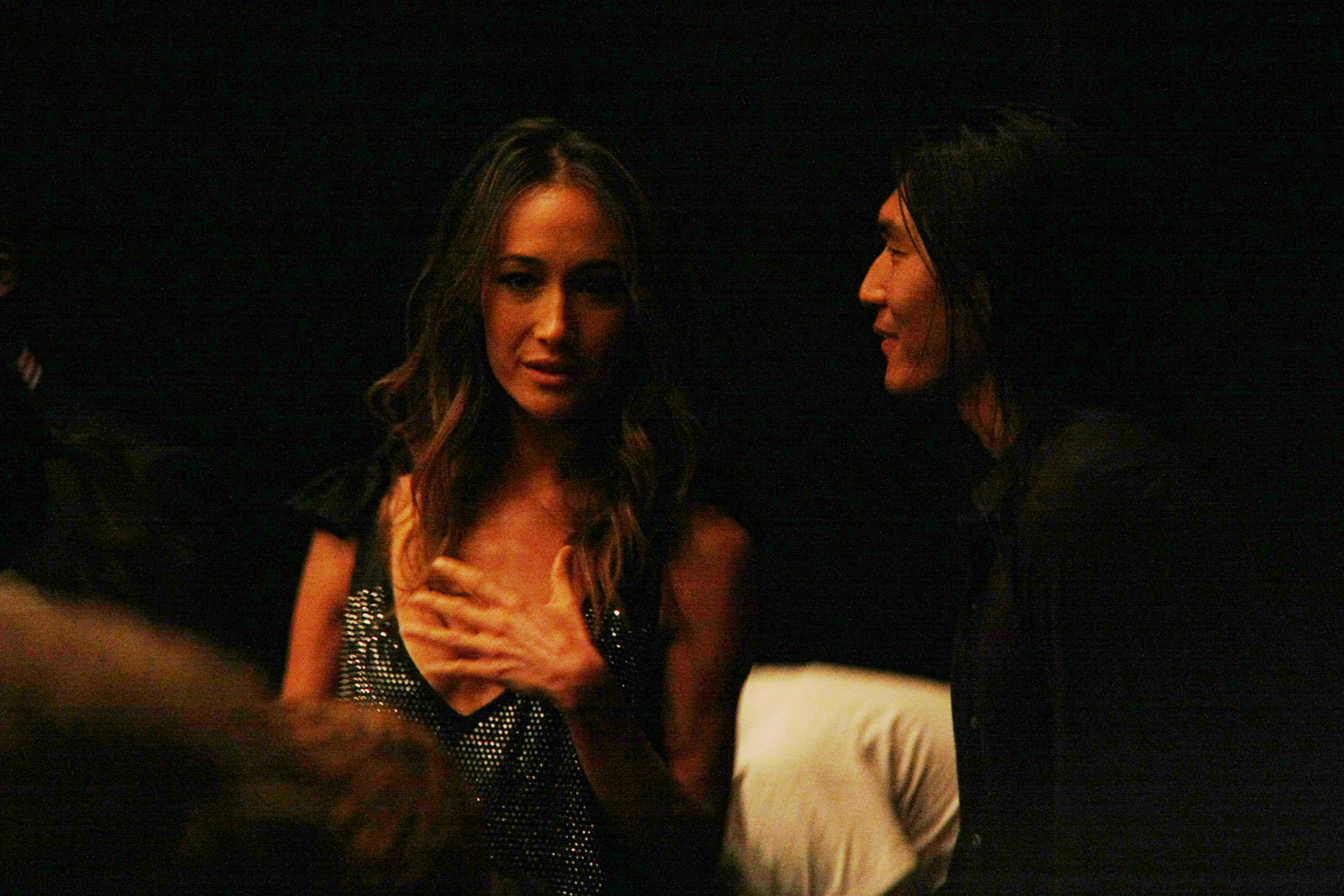
Q at the world premiere of The Warrior and the Wolf in 2009

=== 1996–2005: Modeling and Hong Kong films ===
At a friend's suggestion, Q began modeling in Tokyo, Japan at the age of 17, before making an unsuccessful move to Taipei, Taiwan. She tried again in Hong Kong, where she began using the stage name Maggie Q because the locals could not pronounce Quigley properly. She has said it was not easy for her: "I had twenty bucks in my pocket. I mean, I literally did the same thing that my mother did when she left Vietnam... didn't speak the language... had no money." But in Hong Kong, she became a protégé of Jackie Chan, who saw in her a potential action star. His intensive training taught her the importance of professionalism and always doing her own stunts. She later said: "I had never done a day of martial arts in my life when I started in the business. I couldn't even touch my toes." Over the course of her career, Q trained in multiple martial arts disciplines, including Chinese Wushu, Qigong, and Wing Chun.

In 1998, she started her acting career in the TV drama House of the Dragon, which was a huge hit in Asia. In 2000, she made her film debut as Anna in the horror film Model from Hell, and went on to star as FBI agent Jane Quigley in the action thriller Gen-Y Cops that year. Her appearance in Gen-Y Cops impressed Chan so much that he cast her in his films Manhattan Midnight and Rush Hour 2.

In 2002, she starred as martial artist assassin Charlene Ching in the action film Naked Weapon. In 2004, she co-starred with Kelly Hu, Russell Wong and other Asian-American actors in a 30-second PSA produced by Mark Allen for CAUSE USA (Center for Asian Americans United for Self Empowerment), The Least Likely, encouraging Asian and Pacific Islander Americans to register and vote. In 2005, she played Harmony in the German-Singaporean TV mini-series House of Harmony, opposite Fann Wong, and co-produced the animal treatment documentary Earthlings narrated by Joaquin Phoenix.

=== 2006–2013: Hollywood career and Nikita ===
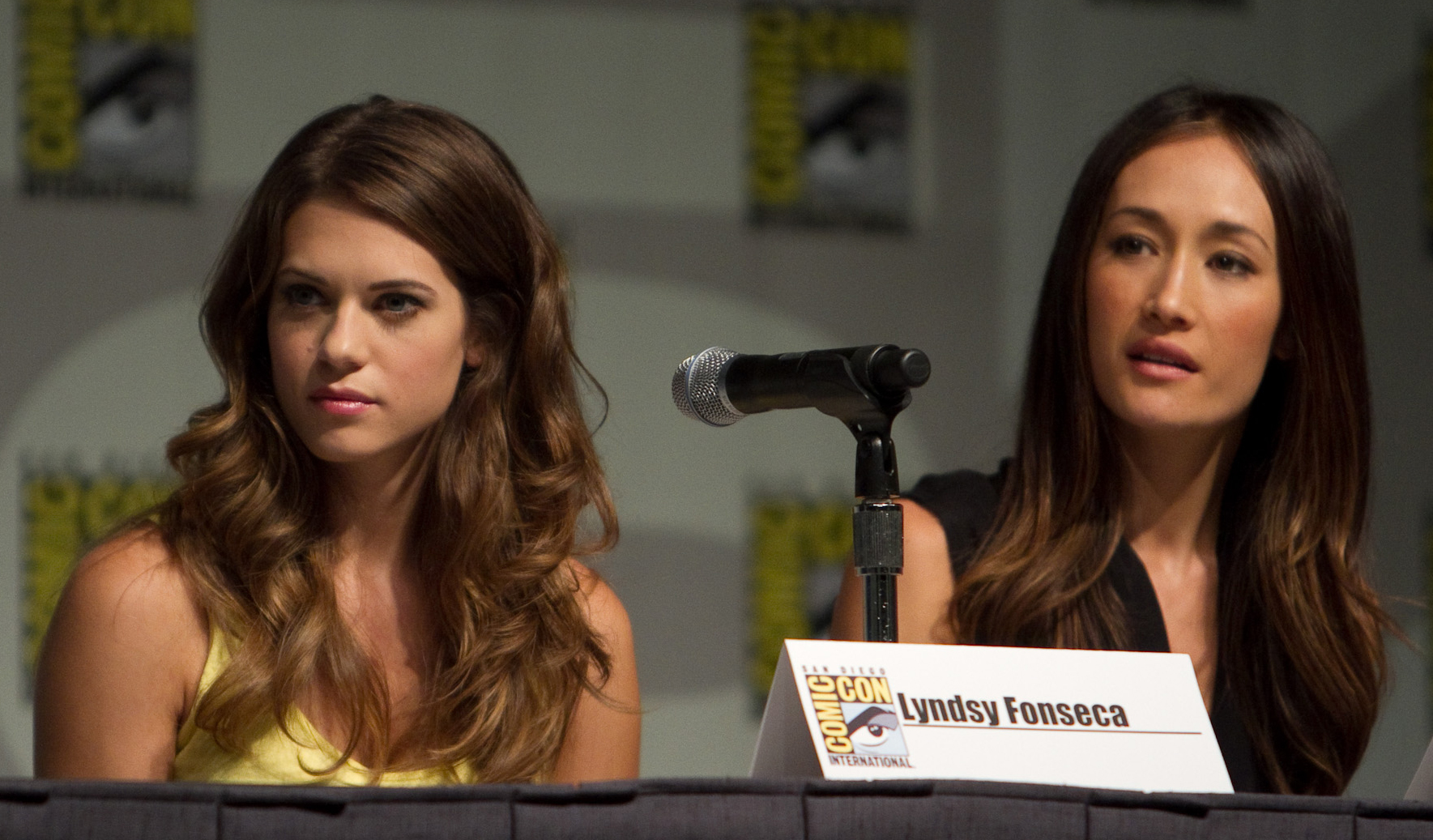
Lyndsy Fonseca and Q at a panel for the television series Nikita at San Diego Comic-Con in July 2010.

In 2006, Q made her Hollywood breakthrough as co-star in Mission: Impossible III alongside Tom Cruise. She played Zhen, the only female member of the IMF team. In 2007, she appeared as Mai Linh in the Bruce Willis movie Live Free or Die Hard, the fourth film in the Die Hard series, and as Maggie in Balls of Fury. In 2008, she played fictional Cao Ying, a granddaughter of the warlord Cao Cao in Three Kingdoms: Resurrection of the Dragon, her first ancient Chinese costume performance. That year, she also appeared in the drama/thriller movie Deception starring Ewan McGregor and Hugh Jackman, as Tina, an investment banker who introduces Jackman's character to an exclusive anonymous sex club list. She also stars in the video game Need for Speed: Undercover as the seductive lead character, federal agent Chase Linh, the player's only contact to the Tri-City Police.

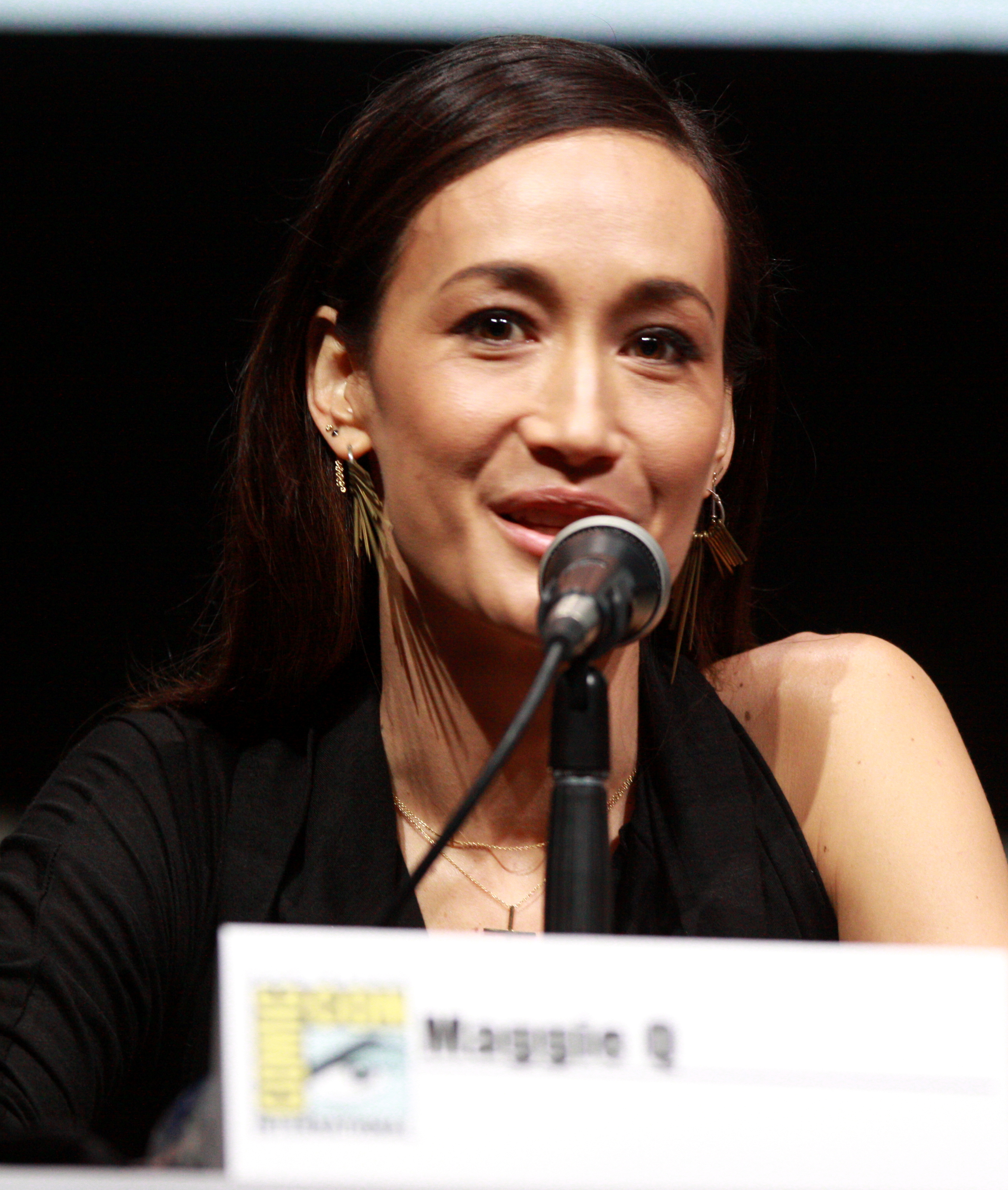
Q during a panel at San Diego Comic-Con in July 2013

In 2010, Q became the lead character, an assassin gone rogue, on the CW series Nikita, based on the 1990 French film of the same name. Since its premiere, she has been incorrectly described as the first Asian American series lead in an American television drama. (Actress Anna May Wong was the first Asian American series lead of an American television series with her show The Gallery of Madame Liu-Tsong, which aired in 1951.) Q received mostly positive reviews for her role in the series. Her character was included in TV Guide's lists of "TV's Sexiest Crime Fighters" and "TV's Toughest Ladies".

=== 2014–present ===
In 2014, Q played the role of Dauntless faction member Tori Wu, in the film Divergent, the adaptation of the eponymous novel. Q reprised her role in the sequel to Divergent, The Divergent Series: Insurgent, which began filming on May 27, 2014, and was released on March 20, 2015. She also starred in the CBS drama series Stalker by Kevin Williamson as Detective Beth Davis along with Mariana Klaveno and Dylan McDermott. The series premiered on October 1, 2014, for the 2014–15 fall television season. The series was ordered for a full season on October 27, 2014. The series however was canceled after one season, leaving the show on a cliffhanger. In October 2013, Q started filming for The Crash, starring alongside Frank Grillo, AnnaSophia Robb, Dianna Agron, John Leguizamo, Ed Westwick, Mary McCormack, Christopher McDonald and Minnie Driver. The film was directed by Aram Rappaport and produced by Hilary Shor, Atit Shah and Aaron Becker. The Crash had a direct-to-VOD and limited release on January 13, 2017, in North America.

She reprised her role in The Divergent Series: Allegiant, the third installment of the Divergent series, which was released on March 18, 2016. In February 2016, it was announced that she would co-star opposite Kiefer Sutherland in the ABC drama series Designated Survivor as Hannah Wells, a leading FBI agent. The show was renewed by Netflix for a third and final season, which was released on June 7, 2019. However, her character was killed off early in the final season.

In December 2020, she portrayed Sarah in the Fox comedy series Pivoting. She starred as an assassin in The Protégé, an action film featuring Samuel L. Jackson and Michael Keaton, which was released to theaters August 20, 2021. In March 2024, it was announced that she was cast as Homicide Detective Renée Ballard in the Bosch spin-off series centered around Michael Connelly's character. She is investigating cold cases with the help of Harry Bosch (Titus Welliver).

== Personal life ==
After meeting her Stalker co-star Dylan McDermott on-set in early 2014, their engagement was announced on January 14, 2015. They stated in 2017 that they were not in any rush to be married. They ended their relationship in February 2019.

Q has five tattoos: a cross on her right forearm; Tibetan script and a little triangle on her left forearm; a Zulu proverb on her side—"umuntu ngumuntu ngabantu", which means "a person's character is made by the collective"; and one of a phoenix on her left hip, which she has had to conceal for most of her roles except Nikita. She suffered temporary hearing loss in her right ear after her eardrum was damaged during an explosive stunt in 2010.

She owned a house in Pound Ridge, New York, which she sold to Zoe Kravitz in 2021. She announced she was married on the July 7, 2025 episode of Live with Kelly and Mark. She married Vietnam-born, US-raised entrepreneur Curtis Macnguyen, a retired hedge fund manager and entrepreneur, best known for founding Ivory Investment Management in 1998.

== Activism ==
Q is outspoken on the subject of animal rights and has taken part in PETA Asia's campaigns promoting vegetarianism. A vegetarian for many years, she has said that giving up meat was one of the most rewarding decisions she has ever made. "I feel better, I have more energy, on and off the set, and I have the satisfaction of knowing that I'm doing something to help stop animal suffering." In 2008, she was named PETA Asia-Pacific's Person of the Year, and PETA listed her as one of the Best-Dressed Celebrities of 2008. She has since taken the step to cut all animal products from her diet by becoming a vegan. PETA named her one of their three Sexiest Vegans of 2017. She is currently an ambassador for Animals Asia Foundation.

== Business ventures ==
In 2019, Q launched Qeep Up, a sustainable activewear brand manufacturing women's apparel including leggings, sports bras, and swimwear from recycled ocean waste and post-consumer materials. The clothing line is produced in ethical factories in Los Angeles, California, with yarn created from plastics collected on the Eastern Seaboard.

in 2017, she founded ActivatedYou with Frank Lipman, an integrative medicine physician and gut-health expert. The brand produces a range of dietary supplements and nutritional products designed to support digestive health, energy, and overall wellness. Q has stated that her involvement in the company was inspired by her personal health research and began over a decade before its public launch.

Both ventures reflect Q's long-standing commitment to animal rights, environmental sustainability, and wellness advocacy. ActivatedYou sponsors the Animal Rescue Mission, a charity that works to rescue, rehabilitate, re-home homeless and abused animals, primarily in the Los Angeles area.

== Filmography ==
=== Film ===
Year	Title	Role	Notes
1995	Powder	Girl in class	
2000	Model from Hell	Anna	Chinese: 鬼名模
2000	Gen-Y Cops	Jane Quigley	Chinese: 特警新人類2
2001	Manhattan Midnight	Susan / Hope	
2001	Rush Hour 2	Girl in car	
2002	Naked Weapon	Charlene Ching	Chinese: 赤裸特工
2003	The Trouble-Makers	Miss Clary	Chinese: 一屋兩火
2004	Magic Kitchen	May	Chinese: 魔幻厨房
2004	Around the World in 80 Days	Female agent	
2004	Rice Rhapsody	Gigi	Chinese: 海南雞飯
2005	Dragon Squad	Yuet	Chinese: 猛龍
2006	Mission: Impossible III	Zhen Lei	
2007	The Counting House	Jade	
2007	Live Free or Die Hard	Mai Linh	
2007	Balls of Fury	Maggie Wong	
2008	Three Kingdoms: Resurrection of the Dragon	Cao Ying	Chinese: 三國之見龍卸甲
2008	Deception	Tina	
2008	New York, I Love You	Janice Taylor	Segment: "Yvan Attal"
2009	The Warrior and the Wolf	Harran woman	Chinese: 狼災記
2010	Operation: Endgame	High Priestess	
2010	The King of Fighters	Mai Shiranui	
2011	Priest	Priestess	
2014	Divergent	Tori Wu	
2014	Unity	Narrator	Documentary
2015	The Divergent Series: Insurgent	Tori Wu	
2016	The Divergent Series: Allegiant	Tori Wu	
2017	The Crash	Hilary	
2017	Slumber	Alice	
2018	The Con Is On	Irina	
2018	Modest Heroes	Mom (voice)	Segment: "Life Ain't Gonna Lose"
2020	Fantasy Island	Gwen Olsen	
2020	The Argument	Sarah	
2020	Death of Me	Christine	
2021	The Protégé	Anna	
2023	Fear the Night	Tess	
2023	The Family Plan	Gwen	

=== Television ===
Year	Title	Role	Notes/Ref.
2002	Mission in Trouble	Yeung Lan	Main role; Chinese: 雄心密令
2005	House of Harmony	Harmony	Television film
2010–2013	Nikita	Nikita Mears	Main role
2012–2019	Young Justice	Wonder Woman (voice)	Recurring role
2013	Whose Line Is It Anyway?	Herself	Guest
2014–2015	Stalker	Beth Davis / Michelle Webber	Main role
2016–2019	Designated Survivor	Hannah Wells	Main role
2022	Pivoting	Sarah	Main role
2025	Bosch: Legacy	Renée Ballard	Main role (season 3) (Note: Q appears as Detective Renée Ballard only in the season 3 finale, where the character is introduced as a lead for the spin-off series Ballard.)
2025	Ballard	Renée Ballard	Main role

=== Video games ===
Year	Title	Voice role
2008	Need for Speed: Undercover	Chase Linh

=== Music video appearances ===
Year	Artist	Title
2000	Chris Yu	"Subway"
2002	Santana featuring Michelle Branch	"The Game of Love"

=== As producer ===
Year	Title	Notes
2005	Earthlings	Co-producer
2006	Love Asia	Producer
TBA	Queen of Canton	Executive producer

== Awards and nominations ==
Year	Association	Category	Work	Result
2007	Asian Excellence Awards	Supporting Film Actress	Mission: Impossible III	Won
2009	Hawaii International Film Festival	Maverick Award	The Warrior and the Wolf	Won
2010	IGN Summer Movie Awards	Best TV Hero	Nikita	Nominated
2011	IGN Summer Movie Awards	Best TV Hero	Nikita	Nominated
2011	Teen Choice Awards	Choice TV Actress: Action	Nikita	Nominated
2012	IGN Summer Movie Awards	Best TV Hero	Nikita	Nominated
2012	Teen Choice Awards	Choice TV Actress: Action	Nikita	Nominated
2013	TV Guide Awards	Best Ensemble	Nikita	Nominated
2013	Teen Choice Awards	Choice TV Actress: Action	Nikita	Nominated
2014	Young Hollywood Awards	Best Cast Chemistry – Film	Divergent	Nominated
2021	Golden Raspberry Awards	Worst Supporting Actress	Fantasy Island	Nominated
2022	Critics' Choice Super Awards	Best Actress in an Action Movie	The Protégé	Nominated
