= Springtime in a Small Town =

- Film poster
- Directed by: Tian Zhuangzhuang
- Written by: Li Tianji
- Based on: Spring in a Small Town by Li Tianji
- Produced by: William Kong; Li Xiaowan; TIng Yatming
- Starring: Hu Jingfan; Wu Jun; Xin Baiqing; Ye Xiaokeng; Lu Si Si
- Cinematography: Pin Bing Lee
- Edited by: Xu Jianping
- Music by: Zhao Li
- Distributed by: United States: Palm Pictures; United Kingdom: Artificial Eye
- Release dates: 4 September 2002 (Venice); 13 June 2003 (United Kingdom); 14 May 2004 (United States)
- Running time: 116 minutes
- Countries: China; France; Netherlands
- Language: Mandarin

Springtime in a Small Town (Chinese: 小城之春; pinyin: Xiǎochéng zhī chūn) is a 2002 Chinese drama film directed by Tian Zhuangzhuang. The film is a remake of director Fei Mu's 1948 film Spring in a Small Town, written by its original screenwriter Li Tianji (Chinese: 李天濟; pinyin: Lǐ Tiānjì). Though the two movies are referred to by different English titles, they share the same title in Chinese.

Springtime in a Small Town marks the return of Tian Zhuangzhuang to the director's chair, following a nearly nine-year absence since his last film, The Blue Kite (1993). It was funded by several production companies from China (Beijing Film Studio, Beijing Rosart Film), France (Orly Films, Paradis Films), and the Netherlands (Fortissimo Films).

Unlike The Blue Kite, which deployed a large cast, spanned decades, and carried a political message, Springtime is a small intimate chamber-piece.

== Plot ==
The film follows Fei Mu's original fairly closely. Zhang Zhichen (Xin Baiqing), a city doctor, comes to visit his old friend from school Dai Liyan (Wu Jun) shortly after the war against the Japanese has ended. Dai is sickly although Zhang suspects it to be mainly a case of hypochondria. While visiting, he meets Liyan's wife, Yuwen (Hu Jingfan) and Liyan's teenage sister Dai Xiu (Lu Sisi).

Zhang and Yuwen has had a passionate love affair ten years earlier before she had been engaged. Due to her husband's sickness however, the couple has ceased to have any real physical contact. With Zhang back, he and Yuwen find themselves attracted to one another again.

As emotions run high, Dai Xiu's birthday comes up. As the drinks begin to flow, Zhang and Yuwen's mutual attraction become apparent to everyone, especially to Liyan. Too sickly in his mind to care for his wife any longer, he begs Zhang to stay. Liyan then promptly attempts suicide by overdose but is saved by his friend. Zhang then decides that it is best that he departs.

While faithful to the plot of the original, Tian's remake dropped the original's use of a voice-over narration by Yuwen.

== Cast ==
Unlike Tian's ensemble direction in The Blue Kite, the cast here is deliberately limited to only five actors, all of whom were unknowns at the time of Springtime's release.

- Hu Jingfan as Yuwen, the wife
- Wu Jun as Dai Liyan, her husband
- Xin Baiqing as Zhang Zhichen, Dai Liyan's childhood friend and Yuwen's former lover
- Ye Xiaokeng as Lao Huang, Dai Liyan and Yuwen's loyal servant
- Lu Sisi as Dai Xiu, Dai Liyan's young sister

== Reception ==
The film received positive reviews from film critics. On the review aggregator website Rotten Tomatoes, 86% of 44 critics' reviews are positive, with an average rating of 7.5/10. The website's consensus reads: "Director Tian Zhuangzhuang's remake of the 1948 Chinese classic may be too measured in pace for some audiences, but it's a visually sumptuous, well-acted piece." Metacritic, which uses a weighted average, assigned the film a score of 86 out of 100, based on 15 critics, indicating "universal acclaim". Variety praised the film as a "visually rich" and "exquisitely made love story." The Sight and Sound states: "this is a sensual, haunting film, atmospheric and moving, full of melancholy and a subtle eroticism." J. Hoberman of The Village Voice describes the film as "exquisitely crafted" and "a movie of indefinable moods and subtle emotional coloration." Hoberman further writes: "Tian's first feature in the decade...is also his quietest, remaking a 1948 Chinese classic to marvelous effect." Jonathan Rosenbaum of the Chicago Reader writes "This erotically charged drama may not be quite as great as the original, but it's an amazing and beautiful work just the same."

== Awards and nominations ==
- Venice Film Festival, 2002
  - San Marcos Prize
- Tromsø International Film Festival, 2003
  - Don Quixote Award

== DVD ==
Springtime in a Small Town was released in the United States on DVD on 23 November 2004 and is distributed by Palm Pictures. The DVD features subtitles in English.
