= Guo Baochang =

Chinese director and screenwriter (1940–2023)

- 郭宝昌
- Born: August 1940; Beijing, China
- Died: October 11, 2023 (aged 80); Beijing, China
- Other name: Li Baochang
- Occupations: Director; Screenwriter

Guo Baochang (Chinese: 郭宝昌, August 1940 – 11 October 2023) was a Chinese director, screenwriter, writer and playwright.

== Life and career ==
Born in Beijing, at the age of two Baochang lost his father, and his mother and aunt sold him to a wealthy family. After graduating in film direction and screenwriting from the Beijing Film Academy in 1965, he made his directorial debut in 1980 with the film Mist Over Fairy Peak (a.k.a. The Mist of Goddess Peak). In the 1980s he worked as artistic director at Guangxi Film Studio, where he actively supported and promoted the projects of the so-called Fifth Generation film movement, which included Chen Kaige, Zhang Yimou and Tian Zhuangzhuang.

As a director and screenwriter, Baochang is best known for The Grand Mansion Gate, a semi-autobiographical television series which he later also adapted into a stage play and a novel, and whose writing process started when he was 16 years old.

In addition to the novelization of The Grand Mansion Gate, Baochang authored several books, including an autobiography and a history of the Peking opera. He occasionally also worked as an actor. He died on 11 October 2023, at the age of 83.
