= Hero (2002 film) =

Chinese-Hong Kong wuxia film by Zhang Yimou

- Chinese theatrical release poster

Chinese name
- Traditional Chinese: 英雄
- Simplified Chinese: 英雄
Transcriptions
Standard Mandarin
- Hanyu Pinyin: Yīngxióng
Yue: Cantonese
- Jyutping: Jing Hung
- Directed by: Zhang Yimou
- Screenplay by: Feng Li; Bin Wang; Zhang Yimou
- Story by: Feng Li; Bin Wang; Zhang Yimou
- Produced by: Zhang Yimou; Bill Kong
- Starring: Jet Li; Tony Leung; Maggie Cheung; Zhang Ziyi; Donnie Yen; Chen Daoming
- Cinematography: Christopher Doyle
- Edited by: Angie Lam
- Music by: Tan Dun
- Production companies: Sil-Metropole Organisation; CFCC; Elite Group Enterprises; Zhang Yimou Studio; Beijing New Picture Film
- Distributed by: Beijing New Picture Film (China); Miramax Films (United States)
- Release dates: 24 October 2002 (China); 21 December 2002 (Hong Kong)
- Running time: 99 minutes (theatrical); 110 minutes (Director's Cut)
- Countries: China; Hong Kong
- Language: Mandarin
- Budget: $31 million
- Box office: $177.4 million

Hero (Chinese: 英雄; pinyin: Yīngxióng) is a 2002 epic wuxia film directed, co-written, and produced by Zhang Yimou, and starring Jet Li, Tony Leung Chiu-wai, Maggie Cheung, Zhang Ziyi, Donnie Yen and Chen Daoming. The film is a Chinese-Hong Kong co-production, with cinematography by Christopher Doyle and musical score by Tan Dun. The film was nominated for an Academy Award for Best Foreign Language Film at the 75th Academy Awards.

The historical background of the film refers to the Warring States Period in ancient China, when China was divided into seven states. In 227–221 BC, the Qin state was about to unify the other six states, assassins from the six states were sent to assassinate the king of Qin. One of the most famous incidents was Jing Ke's attempted assassination of the King of Qin.

Hero was first released in China on 24 October 2002. At that time, it was the most expensive project and one of the highest-grossing motion pictures in China. Miramax acquired American market distribution rights, but delayed the release of the film for nearly two years. Quentin Tarantino eventually convinced Miramax to open the film in American theaters on 27 August 2004.

The film received positive reviews from critics. It became the first Chinese-language movie to top the American box office, where it stayed for two consecutive weeks, and went on to earn $53.7 million in the United States and $177 million worldwide.

== Plot ==
Hero incorporates multiple (and competing) narratives relating to the planned assassination of Ying Zheng, who will become the first emperor, Qin Shihuang. As the narratives develop and the would-be assassin (Nameless) comes closer to his target, the emperor is portrayed in an increasingly sympathetic way, going from a cruel tyrant to a compassionate, strong, and solitary figure.

During the Warring States period, Nameless, a Qin prefect, arrives at the Qin capital city to meet the king, who has survived multiple assassination attempts by Long Sky, Flying Snow, and Broken Sword. Implementing tight security, the king forbids visitors from approaching within 100 paces. Nameless asserts he has killed the assassins, displaying their weapons. Impressed, the king permits Nameless to approach within ten paces to share his story.

Nameless recounts killing Sky at a gaming house before meeting Flying Snow and Broken Sword at a calligraphy school in a city besieged by the Qin army. Seeking to learn Sword's skill, he commissions a calligraphy scroll with the character for "Sword" (劍). Nameless learns of Snow and Sword's strained relationship. Upon completing the scroll, Nameless reveals his identity and the truth about Snow and Sky's relationship. He challenges Snow to a duel.

Meanwhile, a heartbroken and furious Sword engages in a tryst with his pupil, Moon. Snow kills Sword in retaliation, and Moon when she seeks vengeance. The following day, Nameless slays an emotionally unstable Snow before the Qin army, seizing her sword.

As the story wraps up, the king doubts Nameless, alleging he orchestrated the duels with the assassins. During the previous attempt, the king saw Sword as honorable, doubting his betrayal of Snow. The king suggests the assassins sacrificed themselves to earn Nameless the king's trust, enabling him to get close and assassinate the king.

In the king's version of the story, Nameless approaches Snow and Sword after staging a battle with Sky. He claims to have mastered a technique to kill anyone within ten paces, including the king. To get close to the king, Nameless needs to present one of their weapons. Snow and Sword argue over who should sacrifice themselves, leading to a brief scuffle where Snow injures Sword. Snow faces Nameless before the Qin army, while Sword, still recovering, watches. Snow is defeated, and Moon later gives Nameless her master's sword, suggesting that the swords of Snow and Sword should remain united even in death.

Nameless admits possessing the special technique the king mentioned but insists the King underestimated Sword. He reveals the technique's dual nature: deadly yet capable of appearing fatal while avoiding vital organs. Nameless used it on Sky, then orchestrated a fake duel with Snow and Sword. Snow agrees, but Sword refuses. Snow accuses Sword of squandering their chance three years prior when he spared the king of Qin during their assault. In anger, she attacks Sword, wounding him with the help of Nameless. The following day, Nameless "kills" Snow in front of the Qin army.

Later, Sword reveals to Nameless his decision to spare the king, expressing his desire for a unified, peaceful China achievable only through the king's leadership. Sending Nameless to the Qin capital, Sword inscribes "All Under Heaven" (天下) in the sand, urging reconsideration of assassination. Touched by Sword's understanding and the tale, the king overcomes his fear of Nameless. He relinquishes his sword, examines Sword's scroll, and grasps the concept that an ideal warrior should lack the desire to kill. Moved by this wisdom, Nameless abandons his mission, sparing the king.

When Snow discovers that Sword persuaded Nameless to abandon the assassination, she angrily confronts Sword, which escalates into a duel. Hoping that Snow will grasp his love for her, Sword refuses to defend himself, and is inadvertently killed by Snow. Consumed by grief, Snow commits suicide.

Despite the king's reluctance, he orders Nameless's execution to uphold the law and set an example for national unity. Nameless is honored with a hero's funeral.

== Cast ==
- Jet Li as Nameless (无名)
  A Qin prefect of a small province, orphaned at an early age. Forged into a master swordsman over years of training, Nameless possesses the singular technique "Death at Ten Paces" allowing him to strike precisely within that distance. He is the primary conspirator to assassinate the king, but ultimately decides that China's unification and peace are more important than vengeance. Hero also saw Jet Li's first appearance in a film produced by mainland China, after his debut in Shaolin Temple.
- Tony Leung as Broken Sword (殘劍)
  Broken Sword and Flying Snow are the only assassins to ever infiltrate the king's palace, killing hundreds of his personal guard and very nearly the king himself before halting at the last moment. Of all the assassins, Broken Sword is the only one whom Nameless considers his equal in swordsmanship.
- Maggie Cheung as Flying Snow (飛雪)
  A skilled assassin, Flying Snow is Broken Sword's lover and his equal as a swordsman (or close to). She vowed revenge upon the King for killing her father in battle. When Broken Sword convinces Nameless to abandon the assassination attempt on the king, Flying Snow kills him and later herself.
- Chen Daoming as the King of Qin
  An ambitious leader who desires to become the first Emperor of China. Following an assassination attempt, he withdraws into his palace, which he empties of all but his most trusted advisors, and always wears his battle armor.
- Donnie Yen as Long Sky (長空)
  An accomplished spearman, Sky is the first to be "defeated" by Nameless, who takes Sky's broken spear as proof of his defeat to the king.
- Zhang Ziyi as Fading Moon (如月)
  Broken Sword's loyal apprentice, skilled in using twin swords.

== Production ==
Director Zhang Yimou collaborated with Australian cinematographer Christopher Doyle to help realize his plan to divide the film visually into five sections, each dominated by a particular color. Zhang had initially wanted to use different cinematographers and shooting styles, but that proved impractical. Doyle became attached to the film through producer Bill Kong, who had previously contracted Doyle to act as cinematographer on Crouching Tiger, Hidden Dragon, although Doyle was unable to due to his work on In the Mood for Love.

Doyle compared their story to Rashomon, as it has an unreliable narrator and stories within stories. The film tells different version of the story of how an anonymous hero in ancient China overcomes three rivals. The stories are dominated by the colors red, blue, and white. Red represents desire, possessiveness and jealousy. Blue represents reason and friendship. White represents the balance of reason and desire, the ultimate truth. The overall framing story is darker with shades of black, and flashbacks are shown in vibrant greens. The colors were chosen for their aesthetic reasons, not symbolic ones, and the colors orange and pink were not considered as options; Doyle was dismissive of universal theories of color, such as those put forward by Italian cinematographer Vittorio Storaro. For the sequence dominated by the color red, Doyle switched from Fuji film, the brand used for the majority of shooting, to Kodak film, stating it created the appearance of "a much more saturated solid red." For the sequence dominated by the color green, the curtains had to be digitally color-corrected on a computer to achieve what the crew wanted. The color green was selected after they had "ran out of colors" and did not want to use the color pink, with Doyle finding Fuji film produced an "interesting green."

The lake sequences were filmed in the Jiuzhaigou national park in northern Sichuan, China. The desert sequences were shot near the border with Kazakhstan. The crew would search for locations and subsequently determine what colors would be used, altering the script to do so.

== Music ==
The film was scored by Tan Dun, who also conducted the China Philharmonic Orchestra and Chorus for the recording. The composer Chen Yuanlin also collaborated in the project. Itzhak Perlman performs most of the violin solos, with additional solos by Tan Dun himself. The theme song, Hero (英雄), composed by Zhang Yadong and Lin Xi, was sung by Faye Wong. It is unavailable in the American versions of the film DVD and soundtrack album. Wind & Sand (風沙) is a song inspired by the film and was sung by Tony Leung. The musical instrument seen and played during the fight in the weiqi courtyard scene is a guqin. The guqin music for that scene was performed by Liu Li.

== Release ==
Hero was first released in China on 24 October 2002. Disney subsidiary Miramax owned the American-market distribution rights, but delayed the release of the film a total of six times. Import DVDs of the film were sold online and Miramax demanded that the sites cease selling the DVD.

The movie was finally released in American theaters on 27 August 2004 after intervention by Disney executives, Government of China and Quentin Tarantino, who helped secure an English-subtitled release. Tarantino also offered to lend his name to promotional material for the film in order to attract box office attention to it; his name was attached to the credits as "Quentin Tarantino Presents". In addition, a sword held by Jet Li's character in the original promotional poster was replaced by weapon resembling a katana, a Japanese weapon, in the North American promotional poster, which was both anachronistic and culturally misplaced. The United States version of the DVD, with Mandarin, English, and French soundtracks, was released on 30 November 2004 by Miramax. In 2010, Miramax was sold by Disney, later being taken over by Qatari company beIN Media Group. ViacomCBS (now known as Paramount Skydance) acquired the rights to Miramax's film library in April 2020, after buying a 49% stake in the studio from beIN. Paramount Home Entertainment reissued the film on DVD on September 22, 2020, along with many other Miramax titles they had acquired.

In the United Kingdom, it was 2013's sixth most-watched foreign-language film on television, with 150,100 viewers on Channel 4.

=== Translation of "Tianxia" ===
There has been some criticism of the film for its American-release translation of one of the central ideas in the film: Tiānxià (天下) which literally means "Under heaven", and is a phrase to mean "the World". For its release in Belgium, two years before the U.S. release, the subtitled translation was "all under heaven". The version shown in American cinemas was localized as the two-word phrase "our land" instead, which seems to denote just the nation of China rather than the whole world. Whether Zhang Yimou intended the film to also have meaning with regard to the world and world unity was at that time difficult to say. Zhang Yimou was asked about the change at a screening in Massachusetts and said it was a problem of translation: "If you ask me if 'Our land' is a good translation, I can't tell you. All translations are handicapped. Every word has different meanings in different cultures." In Cause: The Birth of Hero—a documentary on the making of Hero—Zhang mentions that he hopes the film will have some contemporary relevance, and that, in the aftermath of the September 11 attacks the themes of universal brotherhood and "peace under heaven" may indeed be interpreted more globally, and taken to refer to peace in "the world." The phrase was later changed in television-release versions of the film.

== Reception ==
=== Box office ===
The film opened in China in October 2002. It grossed CN¥100 million within a week, and CN¥243 million in three months. It topped the 2002 annual Chinese box office and set the record for the domestic highest-grossing film in China, earning CN¥250 million ($30 million).

On 27 August 2004, after a long delay, Hero opened in 2,175 North American screens uncut and subtitled. It debuted at #1, grossing $18 million in its opening weekend. Hero grossed $53.7 million in the United States and Canada. It is currently the fifth highest grossing non-English film in North America, behind The Passion of the Christ, Crouching Tiger, Hidden Dragon, Life is Beautiful, and Godzilla Minus One. Hero grossed $123.7 million in international territories outside North America, for a worldwide total of $177.4 million.

=== Critical response ===
On Rotten Tomatoes, the film has an approval rating of 94% based on 210 reviews, with an average rating of 8.20/10. The website's critics consensus reads: "With death-defying action sequences and epic historic sweep, Hero offers everything a martial arts fan could ask for." On Metacritic, the film has a weighted average score of 85 out of 100 based on 42 critics, indicating "universal acclaim". Audiences surveyed by CinemaScore gave the film a grade "A−" on scale of A to F.

Roger Ebert called it "beautiful and beguiling, a martial arts extravaganza defining the styles and lives of its fighters within Chinese tradition." He said the film "demonstrates how the martial arts genre transcends action and violence and moves into poetry, ballet and philosophy." Richard Corliss of Time described the film as being like "Rashomon with a Mandarin accent" and compared the film to House of Flying Daggers, but said "Hero is the masterpiece", adding that "it employs unparalleled visual splendor to show why men must make war to secure the peace and how warriors may find their true destiny as lovers." Michael Wilmington of the Chicago Tribune called it "swooningly beautiful, furious and thrilling" and "an action movie for the ages." Charles Taylor of Salon took an especially positive stance, deeming it "one of the most ravishing spectacles the movies have given us". Manohla Dargis of The New York Times wrote: "Filled with meticulous set pieces, including a showdown between Snow and Moon set among swirls of golden-yellow leaves, Hero is easy on the eyes, but it's too segmented to gather much momentum and too art-directed to convey much urgency." Dargis was impressed by the beauty of the actors and their compelling performances, "whose passions erupt as fiercely as any of the film's fights though often to more devastating effect." She concludes: "less than the sum of its attractive parts, it's nonetheless generally pleasurable." Derek Elley of Variety called it: "A dazzlingly lensed, highly stylized meditation on heroism."

Nevertheless, there were several film critics who felt the film had advocated autocracy and reacted with discomfort. J. Hoberman of The Village Voice deemed it to have a "cartoon ideology" and justification for ruthless leadership comparable to Triumph of the Will. Stephen Hunter of The Washington Post wrote an otherwise positive review, but concluded: "The movie, spectacular as it is, in the end confronts what must be called the tyrant's creed, and declares itself in agreement with the tyrant." The "Sixth Generation" movement director Jia Zhangke described the focus of the film as "authority of power" that "for 'harmony in the world,' we should give up individual fights and efforts", and made him uncomfortable.

The film also has been interpreted as a nuanced investigation into the relationship between culture on one hand, and political or military power on the other. In this approach, the film comments not only on China and its position in the world, but also on the ongoing erasures of languages and cultures under globalization.

Zhang Yimou himself maintained that he had absolutely no political points to make.

=== Accolades ===
In 2014, Time Out polled several film critics, directors, actors and stunt actors to list their top action films. Hero was listed at 77th place on this list.

Award	Category	Recipients	Result	Ref.
Golden Globe Awards	Best Foreign Language Film	Hero	Nominated	
Golden Bauhinia Awards	Best Cinematography	Christopher Doyle	Won	
Golden Bauhinia Awards	Best Supporting Actress	Zhang Ziyi	Nominated	
Berlin International Film Festival		Hero	Nominated	
Berlin International Film Festival	Alfred Bauer Prize	Zhang Yimou	Won	
Academy Awards	Best Foreign Language Film	Hero	Nominated	
Hong Kong Film Awards	Best Film	Hero	Nominated	
Hong Kong Film Awards	Best Director	Zhang Yimou	Nominated	
Hong Kong Film Awards	Best Screenplay	Li Feng, Zhang Yimou and Wang Bin	Nominated	
Hong Kong Film Awards	Best Actress	Maggie Cheung	Nominated	
Hong Kong Film Awards	Best Supporting Actress	Zhang Ziyi	Nominated	
Hong Kong Film Awards	Best Cinematography	Christopher Doyle	Won	
Hong Kong Film Awards	Best Film Editing		Nominated	
Hong Kong Film Awards	Best Art Direction	Huo Tingxiao and Yi Zhenzhou	Won	
Hong Kong Film Awards	Best Costume Make Up Design	Emi Wada	Won	
Hong Kong Film Awards	Best Action Choreography	Tony Ching Siu-Tung	Won	
Hong Kong Film Awards	Best Original Film Score	Tan Dun	Won	
Hong Kong Film Awards	Best Original Film Song	"Hero" from Hero by Zhang Yadong, Albert Leung and Faye Wong	Nominated	
Hong Kong Film Awards	Best Sound Design		Won	
Hong Kong Film Awards	Best Visual Effects		Won	
Taurus World Stunt Awards	Best Action in a Foreign Film	Tony Ching Siu-Tung	Nominated	
Hundred Flowers Awards	Best Picture	Hero (joint winner with Deng Xiaoping and Charging Out Amazon)	Won	
Golden Rooster Awards	Best Director	Zhang Yimou	Won	
British Independent Film Awards	Best Foreign Independent Film	Hero	Nominated	
New York Film Critics Circle Awards	Best Cinematographer	Christopher Doyle	Won	
National Society of Film Critics Awards	Best Director	Yimou Zhang (also for House of Flying Daggers)	Won	
National Society of Film Critics Awards	Best Cinematography	Christopher Doyle	Nominated	

== See also ==
- House of Flying Daggers
- Jet Li filmography
- List of martial arts films
