= Tian Zhuangzhuang =

Chinese filmmaker

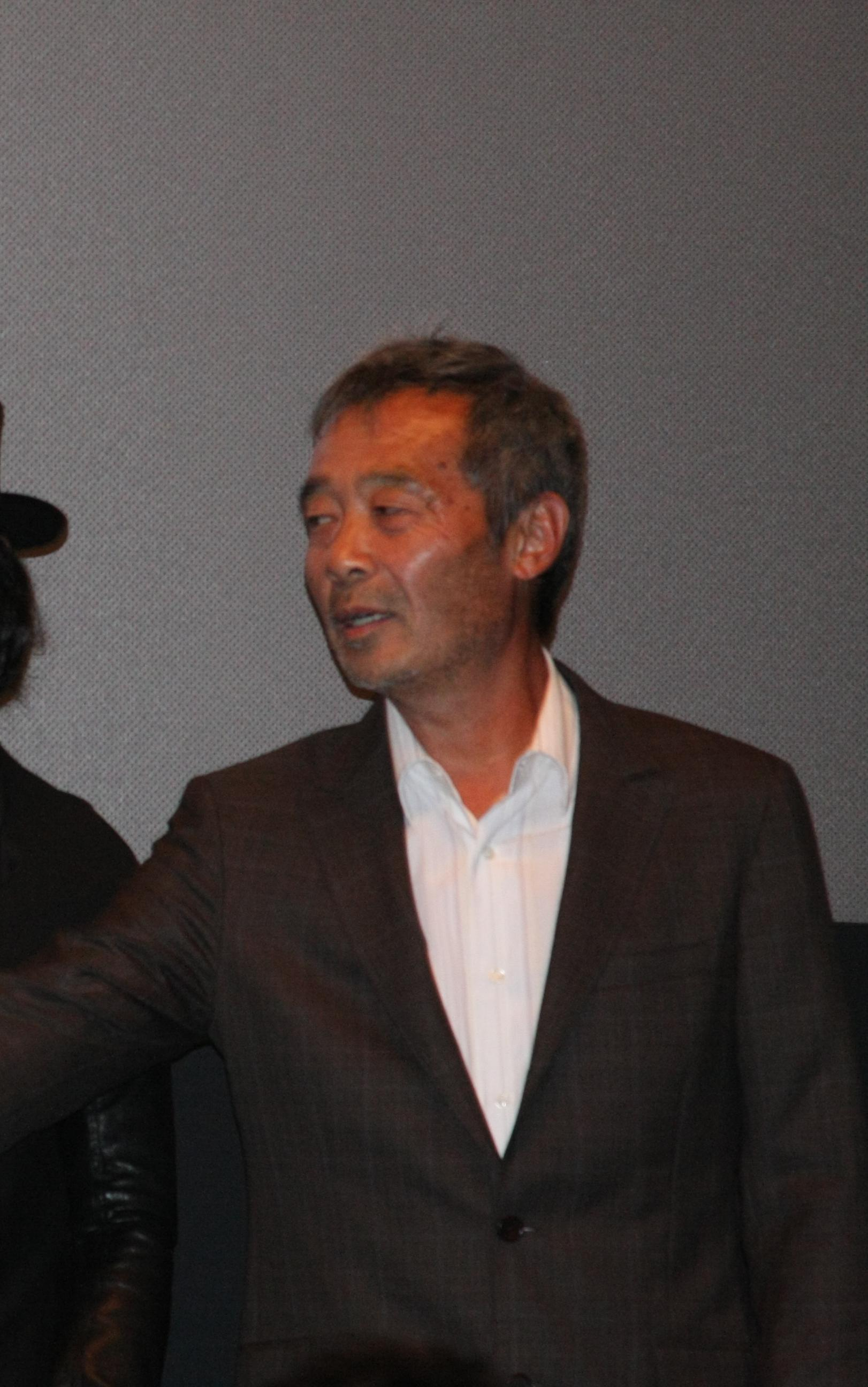
- Tian at 2009 Toronto International Film Festival
- Born: 23 April 1952 (age 74); Beijing, China
- Education: Beijing Film Academy
- Occupations: Film director, producer, actor and professor at Beijing Film Academy
- Years active: 1980–present
- Parent(s): Tian Fang (father); Yu Lan (mother)
- Awards: Tokyo Grand Prix; 1993 The Blue Kite; San Marco Prize; 2002 Springtime in a Small Town; Jin Jue for Best Director; 2007 The Go Master

Chinese name
- Traditional Chinese: 田壯壯
- Simplified Chinese: 田壮壮
Transcriptions
Standard Mandarin
- Hanyu Pinyin: Tián Zhuàngzhuàng
- IPA: [tʰjɛ̌n.ʈʂwâŋʈʂwâŋ]

Tian Zhuangzhuang (Chinese: 田壮壮; born April 1952 in Beijing) is a Chinese film director, producer and actor.

Tian was born to an influential actor and actress in China. Following a short stint in the military, Tian began his artistic career first as an amateur photographer and then as an assistant cinematographer at the Beijing Agricultural Film Studio. In 1978, he was accepted to the Beijing Film Academy, from which he graduated in 1982, together with classmates Chen Kaige and Zhang Yimou. The class of 1982 collectively would soon gain fame as the so-called Fifth Generation film movement, with Tian Zhuangzhuang as one of the movement's key figures.

Tian's early career was marked both with avant-garde documentary infused films (On the Hunting Ground (1985), The Horse Thief (1986)) to more commercial fare (Li Lianying: The Imperial Eunuch (1991)). In 1991, Tian began work on a quiet epic about one of modern China's darkest moments. This film, The Blue Kite (1993), would eventually result in Tian's nearly decade long exile from the film industry, an exile he returned from with Springtime in a Small Town (2001). Throughout the 2000s, Tian Zhuangzhuang returned to the fore of Chinese cinema, directing films like the biopic The Go Master (2006) and the historical action film The Warrior and the Wolf (2009). Since his banning after the release of The Blue Kite, Tian has also emerged as a mentor for some of China's newest film talents, and he has helped produce several important films for these new generations of directors.

== Early life ==
Tian Zhuangzhuang was born on April 23, 1952, in Beijing. He was the son of Tian Fang, a famous actor in the 1930s who became head of the Beijing Film Studio after 1949, and Yu Lan, an actress who later ran the Beijing Children's Film Studio. Given his parents' busy jobs as studio chiefs, Tian was raised primarily by his grandmother, though his parents' positions also allowed him to live a relatively comfortable childhood. But because of the Tians' prominence, Tian Zhuangzhuang suffered heavily during the Cultural Revolution, and both his parents were persecuted. Unlike fellow director Chen Kaige, however, Tian never joined the Red Guards, and was eventually sent to the countryside in Jilin, like many youths from so-called "bad families."

Though from a cinema family, Tian did not initially want to follow in the family footsteps. Instead, Tian enlisted in the People's Liberation Army in 1968 and served for three years. There he met a war photographer, who introduced him to the camera. Working as a photographer for five years, Tian eventually decided to switch to cinematography and found a job as an assistant cinematographer at the Beijing Agricultural Film Studio.

== Professional career ==
=== Early career ===
In 1978, after three years at the studio, Tian applied for entrance in the Beijing Film Academy and was accepted. However, he was forced to apply to the directing department rather than the cinematography department due to his age.

While enrolled in the Beijing Film Academy, Tian directed a short student film, Our Corner (1980), based on a short story by Shi Tiesheng. Technically, Our Corner stands as the first film made by Fifth Generation directors. Years later, Our Corner would continue to be screened by professors at the BFA, introducing Tian to new generations of actors and filmmakers. As a result of his role in the making of Our Corner, as well as his experience in film before entering school, Tian became a de facto leader among the students of the BFA. They admired not only his natural talent, but also his natural eye for talent and loyalty to his friends, most notably with Hou Yong, who would go on to serve as his cinematographer in many of Tian's early works.

Upon his graduation in 1982, Tian was assigned to the Beijing Film Studio, though his early career was spent making films for other studios. These included works for television, as well as the children's film Red Elephant (1982, co-directed with Zhang Jianya and Xie Xiaojing).

=== International success ===
Tian reached international prominence with a pair of experimental films in the mid-1980s, On the Hunting Ground (1985) and The Horse Thief (1986), both about ethnic minorities in China. Though On the Hunting Ground and The Horse Thief were warmly received abroad — American director Martin Scorsese named The Horse Thief as his favorite film of the 1990s (when The Horse Thief was finally released in the United States) — neither film succeeded domestically, and both were considered commercial flops. On the Hunting Ground, for example, sold a meager four prints. Moreover, both films were criticized by the state and by traditionalists as elitist, and as pandering to foreign audiences, a charge that Tian vigorously and defiantly accepted, arguing that films were for the sophisticated. Nevertheless, stung by the rebukes, Tian followed up The Horse Thief with a string of commercially viable films, including Street Players (1987) (his first with the Beijing Film Studio), Rock 'n' Roll Kids (1988), and the historical costume film Li Lianying: The Imperial Eunuch (1991). Tian has since tried to distance himself from these films, often noting that they were part of a journeyman period of his career, where he would sign on to direct existing projects with funding and screenplays already in place.

In 1998 Tian was honoured with a Prince Claus Award from the Prince Claus Fund, an international culture and development organisation based in Amsterdam.

=== Domestic criticism ===
Many of Tian's earlier works had drawn criticism from the Chinese government. For example, television producers refused to screen his short film Our Corner, and his first major film, September (1984), suffered censor interference with several major scenes left on the cutting room floor. But Tian would not face serious consequences as a result of his work until his masterpiece, The Blue Kite (1993), a film about the adverse effects of Communist rule from the Hundred Flowers Movement, through the Great Leap Forward, and especially the Cultural Revolution. The film's quiet criticism of Communist policies in the 1950s and 1960s quickly made it a pariah in the Beijing Film Studio, who refused to submit the film for central approval to be sent abroad for post-production. The Blue Kite reportedly had to be smuggled out of the country by Tian's friends, where it would proceed to screen at foreign film festivals (including the 1993 Cannes Film Festival) without approval. Due to the controversy, Tian resigned from his position in the Beijing Film Studio in March 1994. A month later, he became one of six filmmakers blacklisted by the government in April 1994, along with Sixth Generation helmers Wang Xiaoshuai, He Jianjun, Zhang Yuan, Zhang's wife, screenwriter Ning Dai, and the documentary filmmaker Wu Wenguang.

The ban would last officially until 1996, though Tian would not make another film for several more years. In the interim, he focused on producing, and helped shepherd some of China's new generation of directors with their projects, including his former art director Huo Jianqi (1995's The Winner) and the Sixth Generation mainstays, Lu Xuechang (1996's The Making of Steel in which Tian also acted) and Wang Xiaoshuai (1998's So Close to Paradise, a film that would see its own share of controversy). Tian's role as mentor for new filmmakers has continued into the 21st century and has seen Tian taking young talent such as Ma Liwen and Ning Hao under his wing.

=== Career revival ===
After a hiatus from directing of some nine years where Tian mainly focused on producing other directors' works, he returned with a critically acclaimed remake of Fei Mu's masterpiece, Spring in a Small Town (1948), entitled Springtime in a Small Town. As Tian's first film after his ban for The Blue Kite, Springtime was a small, intimate chamber piece with only five roles. To some critics, it reflected Tian's attempt to "play it safe," though the film's lack of political message did not dull its critical reception.

In 2004, Tian returned to his favorite subject of China's ethnic minorities with Delamu, a HD-filmed documentary about peoples in Yunnan and Tibet. Delamu was followed by The Go Master (2006), a biopic of the legendary Chinese Go player, Go Seigen.

The latest work by Tian is a historical epic, The Warrior and the Wolf, filmed in China's remote Xinjiang Autonomous Region. The film was originally to star Tang Wei of Lust, Caution, but Tang was replaced by actress Maggie Q after the former was banned by Chinese authorities.

== Filmography ==
=== As director ===
Year	English title	Original title	Notes/Ref.
1980	Our Corner	我们的小院	Short, co-directed with Xie Xiaojing and Cui Xiaoqin
1980	The Courtyard	校园	Short
1982	Red Elephant	红象	Co-directed with Zhang Jianya and Xie Xiaojing
1984	September	九月	Also known as In September
1985	On the Hunting Ground	猎场扎撒	
1986	The Horse Thief	盗马贼	
1987	Street Players	鼓书艺人	Also known as The Drum Singers; based on the novel by Lao She
1988	Rock 'n' Roll Kids	摇滚青年	Also known as Rock Kids
1989	Unforgettable Life	特别手术室	Also known as Special Operating Room and Illegal Lives
1991	Li Lianying: The Imperial Eunuch	大太监李莲英	Won an Honourable Mention at the 41st Berlin International Film Festival
1993	The Blue Kite	蓝风筝	Screened at the Directors' Fortnight of the 1993 Cannes Film Festival
2002	Springtime in a Small Town	小城之春	
2004	Delamu	茶马古道：德拉姆	Documentary
2006	The Go Master	吴清源	
2009	The Warrior and the Wolf	狼灾记	

=== As producer and executive producer ===
Year	English title	Original title	Director
1992	Family Portrait	四十不惑	Li Shaohong
1995	The Winner	赢家	Huo Jianqi
1995	Rain Clouds over Wushan	巫山云雨	Zhang Ming
1996	The Making of Steel	长大成人	Lu Xuechang
1998	So Close to Paradise	扁担·姑娘	Wang Xiaoshuai
2004	Jasmine Women	茉莉花开	Hou Yong
2004	Love of May	五月之恋	Hsu Hsiao-ming
2004	Passages	路程	Yang Chao
2006	Love in Memory	爱的是你	Hsu Shu-chi

=== As actor ===
Year	English title	Original title	Director	Notes
2001	The Grand Mansion Gate	大宅门	Guo Baochang	
2017	Love Education	相爱相亲	Sylvia Chang	Nominated 54th Golden Horse Award for Best Leading Actor Nominated 37th Hong Kong Film Award for Best Actor Nominated 12th Asian Film Award for Best Supporting Actor Nominated 25th Beijing College Student Film Festival for Best Actor Nominated 9th China Film Director's Guild Awards for Best Actor
2018	Us and Them	后来的我们	Rene Liu	Nominated 55th Golden Horse Award for Best Supporting Actor Nominated 32nd Golden Rooster Award for Best Supporting Actor
2019	My People, My Country	我和我的祖国	Chen Kaige	
2023	The Shadowless Tower	白塔之光	Zhang Lü	Won - 13th Beijing International Film Festival for Best Supporting Actor

== See also ==
- The Fifth Generation - the 1982 class of the Beijing Film Academy
- Hou Yong - Tian's classmate and cinematographer on many of his films
