= List of Chinese films of 2006 =

The following mainland Chinese films were first released in 2006. There were 300 Chinese feature films produced of which 74 were screened in China in 2006.

== Films released ==
Title	Director	Cast	Genre	Notes
The 601st Phone Call	Zhang Guoli	Cecilia Cheung	Comedy	
The Banquet	Feng Xiaogang	Zhang Ziyi	Historical/Drama	
Bliss	Sheng Zhimin	Guan Jiangge, He Xingquan, He Qin	Drama	
Clay Fear	Zhang Jiabei	Lawrence Ng; Miao Pu	Horror	
Courthouse on Horseback	Liu Jie	Li Baotian, Lu Yulai	Comedy/Drama	
Crazy Stone	Ning Hao	Guo Tao	Comedy	
Curiosity Kills the Cat	Zhang Yibai	Hu Jun, Carina Lau	Thriller	
Curse of the Golden Flower	Zhang Yimou	Chow Yun-fat; Gong Li; Jay Chou	Historical epic	
Dong	Jia Zhangke	Liu Xiaodong	Documentary	
Dreams May Come	Xu Jinglei		Drama	
Fearless	Ronny Yu	Jet Li	Wuxia	Hong Kong-Chinese co-production
The Go Master	Tian Zhuangzhuang	Chang Chen	Biographical/Historical	
Jade Warrior	Antti-Jussi Annila		Fantasy	Finnish-Chinese Co-production
Lease Wife	Lu Xuechang	Li Jiaxuan, Pan Yueming	Drama	
Little Red Flowers	Zhang Yuan		Drama	
Loach is Fish Too	Yang Yazhou		Drama/Romance	
Luxury Car	Wang Chao	Tian Yuan	Drama	Prix un certain regard winner at the 2006 Cannes Film Festival
Karmic Mahjong	Wang Guangli	Francis Ng, Cherrie Yip	Comedy/Drama	
The Knot	Yin Li	Chen Kun, Vivian Hsu, Li Bingbing	Romance	2007 Golden Rooster winner for best film
Mini	Jin Chen	Liu Ye	Romance	
The Obscure	Lü Yue	Wang Zhiwen, Wang Tong	Drama	
The Old Barber	Hasi Chaolu	Uncle Jing	Docudrama	Golden Peacock winner at the 2006 International Film Festival of India
The Other Half	Ying Liang		Drama	
Raised from Dust	Gan Xiao'er	Hu Shuli	Drama	
The Road	Zhang Jiarui	Fan Wei, Nie Yuan, Zhang Jingchu	Drama	
Shanghai Rumba	Peng Xiaolian	Yuan Qian, Xia Yu	Romance	
Snow in the Wind	Yang Yazhou	Ni Peng	Drama	
Still Life	Jia Zhangke	Zhao Tao, Han Sanming	Drama	Golden Lion winner of 2006
Stone Mountain	Du Haibin		Documentary	
Summer Palace	Lou Ye	Hao Lei, Guo Xiaodong	Drama/Romance	Banned after being submitted for competition at the 2006 Cannes Film Festival without official approval
Teeth of Love	Zhuang Yuxin	Yan Bingyan, Li Hongtao	Drama	
Thirteen Princess Trees	Lü Yue	Liu Xin	Drama	Special Jury Prize winner at the 2006 Tokyo International Film Festival
Thru the Moebius Strip	Glenn Chaika, Kelvin Lee		Animated	China's first 3D-animated feature film
The Tokyo Trial	Gao Qunshu		Drama/Historical	
Trouble Makers	Cao Baoping		Comedy/Drama	
Walking on the Wild Side	Han Jie	Lü Jie	Drama	Tiger Award at the 2006 International Film Festival Rotterdam
Young and Clueless	Tang Danian	Tian Yuan	Drama	

== See also ==
- List of Chinese films of 2005
- List of Chinese films of 2007
