= Film censorship in China =

Film censorship in China involves the banning of films which are deemed unsuitable for release and it also involves the editing of such films and the removal of content which is objected to by the governments of China. In April 2018, films were reviewed by the China Film Administration (CFA) under the Publicity Department of the Chinese Communist Party (CCP) which dictates whether, when, and how a movie gets released.

== History ==
=== 1923 to 1949 ===
The beginning of film censorship in China came in July 1923, when the "Film Censorship Committee of the Jiangsu Provincial Education Association" (Note: 江苏省教育会电影审阅委员会) was established in Jiangsu. The committee set out specific requirements for film censorship, such as that films must be submitted for review, and that films that failed to pass must be deleted and corrected, or else they would not be allowed to be screened. However, since the committee was a non-government organization and was mostly composed of educators, film makers did not comply with the requirements, which made film censorship ineffective.

In 1926, after the Hangzhou Film Censorship Board, this was the most specific censorship procedure in recorded history and the first film censorship organization to cooperate fully with the police. The Beijing government also established the Film Censorship Committee in the same year. The censorship included issues of morality and crime, as well as indecency, obstruction of diplomatic relations, and "insult to China". However, the Chinese government is not able to extend its jurisdiction over localities, and the effect of film censorship is limited.

In July 1930, the Nationalist Government established the Film and Drama Censorship Committee (Note: 电影戏剧审查委员会) in Nanjing. In 1931, the Executive Yuan passed the Film Censorship Law, and the Ministry of Education and the Ministry of Interior of the Nanjing Government jointly established the Film Censorship Committee. In May 1934, the Film Censorship Council was reorganized into the Central Film Censorship Committee, (Note: 中央电影检查委员会) which became the official film censorship Institution.

The 1930s were a period of nationalism in China. Patriotic sentiment was strong in China, and the Kuomintang government often accused foreign films of insulting China. For example, the 1934 release of the American film "Welcome Danger" was accused by Hong Shen of degrading the Chinese and he had a dispute with the cinema manager. The film was eventually banned by the Kuomintang government.

In addition to crimes and insults to China, pornography was also one of banned contents. In 1932, the "Outline of the Enforcement of the Film Censorship Law" (Note: 电影检查法执行纲要) had vague and ambiguous provisions: depicting obscene and unchaste acts; depicting those who use tricks or violence against the opposite sex to satisfy their lust; depicting incest directly or indirectly; depicting women undressed and naked in an abnormal manner; depicting women giving birth or abortion. All were prohibited.

In the 1940s, the ROC government sought to prevent the release of Hollywood films which it viewed as insulting to China or Chinese people.

=== 1993 to 2017 ===
In 1993, a preliminary draft of the Film Regulations was sent to film studios throughout China for comments, and the Bureau of Legislative Affairs of the State Council coordinated with the Ministry of Propaganda, the Ministry of Culture, the Ministry of Finance, and the Press and Publication Administration to revise the submitted draft repeatedly. In May 1996, after several discussions, the State Administration of Radio and Television (SARFT) confirmed that the film regulations would be promulgated by the State Council, and on May 29, the Standing Committee of the State Council approved the Film Regulation, which came into effect on July 1, 1996. However, the 1996 film regulations soon failed to keep up with the development of the film industry, and China was actively seeking to join the WTO to comply with the open-door policy. The Ministry of Radio, Film and Television prepared a new version of the draft, and on December 25, 2001, the Standing Committee of the State Council approved the amendments and issued a new version of the Film Administration Regulations, which came into effect on February 1, 2002, and repealed the 1996 version.

The 2001 regulations already require studios to conduct self-censorship when preparing their productions, and after self-censorship, scripts must be submitted to the SARFT for the record. The film must be submitted for review and approval before it is issued with a Film Public Screening Permit.

After 2015, China strengthened the standards of control over film legislation. On October 12, 2015, the NPC's Committee on Science, Education, Culture and Health deliberated on the draft proposed by the State Council at the NPC Standing Committee. After three deliberations, in October 2016, the 12th NPC Standing Committee confirmed that it could be adopted with one amendment, and on November 3, 2016, a meeting was held to conclude the matter. The passage of the Film Industry Promotion Law is getting closer and closer.

In January 2017, the SARFT issued a notice to its affiliated units throughout China to promote the Law, and on March 1, the Film Industry Promotion Law came into effect.

=== 2018 to present ===
In March 2018, as part of a series of institutional reforms, the Central Committee of the Chinese Communist Party decided its publicity department would centralize the film management, taking that responsibility away from SAPPRFT, the latter of which was renamed National Radio and Television Administration. In April 2018, the department formally put up a China Film Administration sign. The consequences of this institutional change soon became apparent for industry insiders. Instead of resisting the Chinese state, they were induced to collaborate and practice "complicit creativity," which entails concession, reconfiguration, and collusion.

Indian films were de facto banned from theatrical release in China in 2020 and 2021 due to border skirmishes in addition to the effects of the COVID-19 pandemic.

On June 11, 2021, the Government of the Hong Kong Special Administrative Region announced that changes made to Cap 392 Film Censorship Ordinance would be effective that day and it would begin censoring films according to the requirements from Hong Kong national security law, bringing itself more in line with the rest of the country.

In July 2024, the China Film Administration announced that all short films may only appear at foreign film festivals or exhibitions if they obtain permits for public screenings.

== Film public screening permit ==
The Film Public Screening Permit (Chinese: 电影公映许可证) is issued by the Chinese film censorship department. Since July 1, 1996, films shot locally in China and films imported from abroad must be reviewed and filed in China before they can be released.

According to the Motion Picture Association of America's handbook, Hollywood producers who want to co-produce with Chinese must also apply for a permit before they can be released in China.

== Quota for foreign films ==
The Chinese censorship department's restrictions on the importation of foreign films were also under pressure from the United States, and China's position in the post-Cold War world had to be recognized by the United States. In 1999, China and the United States reached a bilateral agreement on WTO accession, and all countries except the United States opposed the inclusion of film and television products in the WTO's General Agreement on Tariffs and Trade. However, with Hollywood's lobbying group pushing China to neither obey nor ignore this rule, China increased the quota for foreign films in accordance with the U.S.-China agreement. Just before the agreement was reached, the U.S. bombing of the Chinese Embassy in Yugoslavia resulted in a five-month ban on U.S. films in China.

In February 2012, China and the U.S. signed the Memorandum of Understanding between China and the U.S. on the Resolution of WTO Film-Related Issues (the U.S.-China Film Agreement), based on the 1999 agreement. The main content of the agreement is that the import quota for 20 Hollywood films can be unchanged, and 14 commercial films (3D or IMAX) can be added.

The passage of the Film Industry Promotion Act was the cause of China's anti-WTO lawsuit. Back in April 2007, the U.S. requested China to lift restrictions on the import of movies, music and books. After unsuccessful negotiations, the U.S. requested the WTO to establish a trade dispute resolution panel. In December 2009, the Appellate Body upheld the decision, finding that China's restrictions violated WTO member states' obligations and could not be justified on the grounds of protecting public morals. That is, China did violate the restrictions on U.S. entertainment products. China's appeal on the grounds of protecting its citizens, especially minors, from harmful information such as pornography was not accepted. The BBC also reported that if China does not change its current practices within two years, the U.S. has the right to request WTO authorization to impose trade sanctions on China.

== List of suspected banned or unreleased films ==
Below are films that may be banned or self-censored and not released. For official bans and specific reasons at the government level, see List of films banned in China.

Title	Original release year	Country of origin	Notes
The Ten Commandments	1923	United States	Banned in the 1930s under a category of "superstitious films" due to its religious subject matter involving gods and deities.
Ben-Hur: A Tale of the Christ	1925	United States	Banned in the 1930s under a category of "superstitious films" due to its religious subject matter involving gods and deities.
Frankenstein	1931	United States	Banned under a category of "superstitious films" due to its "strangeness" and unscientific elements.
Alice in Wonderland	1933	United States	Banned under a category of "superstitious films" due to its "strangeness" and unscientific elements.
The Unfinished Comedy	1957	China	Banned for undermining socialist morality and attacking the Party.
Ben-Hur	1959	United States	Banned under the regime of Mao Zedong for containing "propaganda of superstitious beliefs, namely Christianity."
Chung Kuo, Cina	1972	Italy	Banned for 32 years for "anti-Chinese."
Yellow Earth	1984	China	Banned then released.
Back to the Future	1985	United States	The film was banned because of time travel.
The Horse Thief	1986	China	The film waited eight months for approval for public release. Ultimately, director Tian Zhuangzhuang told officials that he would re-edit the film to their specifications, and he worked under the close supervision of two censors to cut footage, including portions of a sky burial. Tian felt the process was an "insult" and turned temporarily to commercial filmmaking out of frustration with the censors. The released film was later withdrawn.
Ju Dou	1990	China	Banned upon initial release, but lifted in 1992. The Chinese government gave permission for its viewing in July 1992.
Mama	1990	China	Released in China after a two-year ban.
Life on a String	1991	China	Banned altogether.
Raise the Red Lantern	1991	China	Banned upon initial release, released three years later.
I Have Graduated	1992	China	A documentary about some university students who experienced the 1989 Tiananmen Square protests and massacre.
Beijing Bastards	1993	China	Banned due to subjects involving homosexuality and alienated young people.
Farewell My Concubine	1993	China	The film was objected to for its portrayal of homosexuality, suicide, and violence perpetrated under Mao Zedong's Communist government during the Cultural Revolution. It premiered in Shanghai in July 1993 but was removed from theatres after two weeks for further censorial review and subsequently banned in August. Because the film won the Palme d'Or at the Cannes Film Festival, the ban was met with international outcry. Feeling there was "no choice" and fearing it hurt China's bid for the 2000 Summer Olympics, officials allowed the film to resume public showings in September. This release featured a censored version; scenes dealing with the Cultural Revolution and homosexuality were cut, and the final scene was revised to "soften the blow of the suicide".
To Live	1994	China	Banned due to its critical portrayal of various policies and campaigns of the Communist government. In addition, its director Zhang Yimou was banned from filmmaking for two years. The ban on the film was lifted only in September 2008 after Zhang directed the 2008 Summer Olympics opening ceremony.
The Square	1994	China	The director was banned on all film-making earlier in the year.
Weekend Lover	1995	China	Banned for two years and then released.
Father	1996	China	Also known as Baba/Babu, it was banned, but took home the top prize Golden Leopard at the Locarno Festival in 2000.
East Palace, West Palace	1997	China	Banned due to subjects involving homosexuality and alienated young people.
Babe: Pig in the City	1998	United States	Censor had a policy that live-action animals shown being able to speak were not allowed to be depicted.
Lan Yu	2001	China	The film was banned for homosexuality, references to the 1989 Tiananmen Square protests and massacre, and depiction of corruption in Beijing entrepreneurs.
Conjugation	2001	China	Directed by Emily Tang, it is a fictional film about the challenges faced by a young couple in post-1989 Tiananmen Square protests and massacre.
Brokeback Mountain	2005	United States	The film was banned for homosexuality, a "sensitive topic". China even censored Ang Lee's Academy Award for Best Director acceptance speech for references to homosexuality.
King and the Clown	2005	South Korea	The film was not shown in theaters due to "subtle gay themes" and sexually explicit language. It was given permission for distribution on DVD.
V for Vendetta	2005	United States	Starting in Aug 2020, the movie has been removed from China's major online video platforms, such as iQiyi, Tencent Video, Sohu, Douban, and Maoyan, because of anti-government themes. The Guy Fawkes mask worn by the film character V has been used as a symbol in anti-extradition bill protests in Hong Kong. The movie was never shown in Chinese theaters, but it was unclear whether it had ever been banned prior to 2020. State-owned China Movie Channel surprised viewers back in 2012 by airing it, leading to false hopes about censorship reform. An article on the Communist party's China Youth Daily website said it was previously prohibited from broadcast, but the Associated Press quoted the then censors's spokesman Wu Baoan (吴保安) who said he was not aware of any ban.
Pirates of the Caribbean: Dead Man's Chest	2006	United States	Banned in China because it had spirits swarming around as well as depictions of cannibalism.
The Dark Knight	2008	United States	Warner Bros. did not submit the film to censors for approval, citing "pre-release conditions" and "cultural sensitivities".
Petition	2009	China	The documentary depicts brutalization, harassment, and arrest of people who travel to Beijing to ask that wrongdoing by local officials be amended. The film was banned in China immediately following its premiere at the 2009 Cannes Film Festival.
Spring Fever	2009	Hong Kong France	The film was created during a five-year ban instituted on director Lou Ye and producer Nai An, and it showed at the 2009 Cannes Film Festival and in international theaters without permission. It portrays a gay romance, explicit sexual scenes and full-frontal nudity.
Red Dawn	2012	United States	The film was not released in China, despite changing the invading antagonist from China to North Korea.
A Touch of Sin	2013	China	The film depicts "shocking" violence in China caused by economic inequality and political corruption, including the shooting of local officials. During development of the film, censors asked director Jia Zhangke to revise dialogue and seemed generally unconcerned by violence. Censors did recommend Jia decrease the number of killings but allowed it when Jia refused. The film was cleared for foreign distribution and showed at international festivals. Although the film was initially cleared for local distribution, the film did not open in China on its release date and a directive was given telling journalists not to write about the film. The distributor Xstream Pictures released a statement saying it did not receive a notice the film was banned and that it was continuing to work on local distribution.
World War Z	2013	United Kingdom, United States	The movie contains zombies and has a lead role featuring Brad Pitt, whose films and entry to the country was disallowed between 1997 and 2016 after he starred in Seven Years in Tibet.
Top Gun 3D	2013	United States	The re-release got the silent treatment by the censor. The congressional United States-China Economic and Security Review Commission concluded it portrayed U.S. military dominance.
Captain Phillips	2013	United States	In hacked emails, Rory Bruer, president of worldwide distribution at Sony Pictures, suggested that the plot of American military saving Chinese citizen would make Chinese censor uncomfortable. The direct-to-video was approved.
Noah	2014	United States	Banned for the depiction of prophets.
Crimson Peak	2015	United States	It was reported that the film may be banned because it contained ghosts and supernatural elements. However, Chinese artist and social commentator Aowen Jin believed it more likely that the film was banned due to sexual content and incest.
Mad Max: Fury Road	2015	Australia, United States	Submitted and rejected by censors, possibly due to its dystopian themes. The direct-to-video somehow got approval.
Call Me by Your Name	2017	United States	Due to homosexuality, the film was pulled from the Beijing International Film Festival.
Christopher Robin	2018	United States	While no official reason was given for denying the film's release, images of Winnie-the-Pooh were previously censored and banned since 2017 after social media users compared Pooh to Chinese leader Xi Jinping, causing the character to become associated with political resistance. However, an alternative theory suggested the film was denied because a number of Hollywood tentpole films were competing for space in the limited foreign film quota.
Berlin, I Love You	2019	Germany	Ai Weiwei claimed that the producers were politically pressured to cut the segment he directed because distributors fears his involvement would hurt the film in China. He directed the segment remotely while under house arrest in China for his political activism.
Joker	2019	United States	Not cleared for release.
Monster Hunter	2020	United States	Soon after the release in China on Dec 3, the film was pulled from theaters because a scene featuring a banter between MC Jin's character and his military comrade was considered racially offensive by local audience, despite the Chinese subtitles interpreted it differently. Jin jokingly said: "Look at my knees!" which is followed by the question "What kind of knees are these?" He then answered, "Chi-knees!" Some Chinese viewers interpreted this as a reference to the racist playground chant "Chinese, Japanese, dirty knees", and therefore as an insult to China. The subtitles, however, interpreted as there is gold under a man's knees, so man should not easily kneel. The film was removed from circulation, and Chinese authorities censored references to it online. Tencent Pictures, which is handling local distribution and is an equity partner in the film, is reported to be remedying the situation, but it remains unclear if the movie would then be re-released.
Inside the Red Brick Wall	2021	Hong Kong	A sold-out theatrical premiere of the 2019–2020 Hong Kong protests documentary featuring the siege of the Hong Kong Polytechnic University was canceled.
Where the Wind Blows	2021	Hong Kong	Its world premiere at the 45th Hong Kong International Film Festival was pulled for "technical reasons". The film ultimately received approval and premiered at the 46th Hong Kong International Film Festival. It was released in cinemas on February 5, 2023, in China and February 17 in Hong Kong. Tony Leung Chiu-wai won Best Actor for his role in the film at the Asian Film Awards on March 12, 2023.
An Unfinished Film	2024	Singapore	The film hardly has any chance to be shown in China due to the depiction of frantic control of the pandemic.

== List of edited films ==
Title	Release year in mainland China	Country of origin	Notes
Titanic	1998	United States	The scene in which Rose (Kate Winslet) poses nude for a painting is altered to show her from the neck up, removing her breasts from the shot.
Infernal Affairs	2002	Hong Kong	The ending sees a triad member who has infiltrated the police shoot a member of his gang to prevent becoming exposed. It was unacceptable in China for a criminal to avoid justice, and three endings were shot for censors to approve. In the chosen ending, the mole is confronted by police and he voluntarily gives up his police badge.
Running on Karma	2003	Hong Kong	It ran afoul of Beijing censors for depicting a Chinese protagonist (Cecilia Cheung) reincarnated from a Japanese soldier. Such a premise, though overtly comedic, offends a Chinese government to whom Sino-Japanese relations remain fractious. According to the film's co-writer Au Kin-yee, SAPPRFT – ever vigilant against superstition – also objected to the male hero's preternatural ability to perceive the past lives of others. Consequently, the Milkyway Image creative team excised the male hero's extrasensory 'visions' from the mainland release, resulting in nonsensical stretches of action.
Mission: Impossible III	2006	United States	Censors felt that the film's establishing shot of Ethan Hunt (Tom Cruise) walking past underwear hung from a clothesline was a negative portrayal of Shanghai.
Babel	2006	United States, Mexico, Japan	Censors cut five minutes of nudity scenes.
Casino Royale	2006	United Kingdom, United States, Italy, Czech Republic, Germany	Judi Dench as M said she had to substitute the line "'God, I miss the old times" for "Christ, I miss the Cold War" for release to be allowed in China.
The Departed	2006	United States	Banned from movie theaters for suggesting that the Chinese government might use nuclear weapons against Taiwan, but the direct-to-video got approval (after cutting a few minutes).
Pirates of the Caribbean: At World's End	2007	United States	Captain Sao Feng, played by Chow Yun-fat, demonizes the Chinese and Singapore.
Lust, Caution	2007	United States, China, Taiwan	Censors objected to the film's "political and sexually provocative content" and criticized the film as a "glorification of traitors and insulting to patriots". Seven minutes of sexually graphic scenes were cut by director Ang Lee. Actress Tang Wei was subsequently banned from Chinese media, and award shows were advised to remove her and the film's producers from guest lists. Online mentions of the film and Tang were removed.
Iron Man 2	2010	United States	Words for "Russia" and "Russian" were left untranslated in the subtitles, and the spoken words were muffled.
Titanic 3D	2012	United States	The film is again altered to remove Rose's breasts from the scene in which she poses nude for a painting. Satirical jokes attributed the following explanation for the cuts to an SAPPRFT official: 3D effects would cause audiences to "reach out their hands for a touch and thus interrupt other people's viewing".
Mystery	2012	China	The film was edited for release in China. In response, director Lou Ye removed his name from the film and published his negotiations with the censorship bureau onto Weibo.
Men in Black 3	2012	United States	An alien disguised as a Chinese restaurant worker was offensive for the screen. 13 minutes were claimed to be cut.
Looper	2012	United States	Despite the added Chinese element, the deputy head from SAPPRFT criticized a string of films for not obeying the co-production rules.
Skyfall	2013	United Kingdom, United States	A scene in which James Bond (Daniel Craig) kills a security guard in Shanghai was cut for referencing prostitution in Macau, which was felt to be "morally or politically damaging" and because it was felt to suggest China cannot defend itself.
Cloud Atlas	2013	Germany, United States, United Kingdom	Scenes with sexual content involving straight and gay couples were cut. Thirty-eight minutes, roughly twenty percent of the film's original runtime, was removed.
Iron Man 3	2013	United States	Four minutes of Chinese scenes were added to the local version to "court Chinese censors". They include a product placement from Mengniu Dairy, claiming the milk is good for Iron Man, and additions of Chinese doctors into a surgery scene.
Django Unchained	2013	United States	Violent scenes were altered.
No Man's Land	2013	China	The film, completed in 2010, underwent a three-and-a-half-year approval process. It experienced two major revisions to reduce violent content and clarify thematic intention, and it was reported that the film was removed from release schedules six times.
Parasyte: Part 1 and Parasyte: Part 2	2014 & 2015	Japan	The 2-part film from 2014 and 2015 was merged into one single release in China in 2016, cutting more than 100 minutes of bloody and violent scenes.
Kingsman: The Secret Service	2015	United Kingdom	Scenes were cut due to violent and sexual content.
The Revenant	2016	United States	Thirty seconds are rumored to have been cut.
Miss Peregrine's Home for Peculiar Children	2016	United States	A scene in which the characters enjoy an "eyeball feast" was cut.
Hacksaw Ridge	2016	Australia, United States	Fewer than thirty seconds of graphic violence were cut.
Resident Evil: The Final Chapter	2017	Germany, United Kingdom, United States, Canada, Australia	Seven or eight minutes were cut due to graphic violence and blood.
Logan	2017	United States	Scenes were removed for violence and "brief nudity". The film was also the first affected by the PRC Film Industry Promotion Law effective on March 1, 2017, which requires the film to include a warning for minors in marketing materials.
Love Off the Cuff	2017	Hong Kong	Crude jokes were removed from the film.
Alien: Covenant	2017	United States	Six minutes is scenes which titular aliens covered in blood were cut, leaving "one to two minutes" of the creatures in the film. Other scenes involving violence were also altered. The gay kiss scene between two androids David and Walter was also cut.
Bohemian Rhapsody	2019	United Kingdom, United States	The film was approved for a limited release after one minute of content was cut. This content involved drug use and the male lead character Freddie Mercury kissing other men. The approval follows public outcry over a local streaming company censoring the phrase "gay man" from Rami Malek's acceptance speech for Academy Award for Best Actor for his portrayal of Mercury in the film.
Better Days	2019	Hong Kong, China	The original version that was submitted to 69th Berlin International Film Festival ran 138 minutes, while the version theatrically released in China stood at 135 minutes. The various changes that were made intended to, "blunt the most scathing aspects of Tsang's social critique, while simultaneously communicating that the wisdom of China's party leaders has already righted many of the ills the film presents."
The Eight Hundred	2020	China	The film was pulled from the 2019 release slate to please censors. The approved version that premiered on August 21, 2020, is reported to be 13 minutes shorter than the one that would have screened in 2019.
One Second	2020	China	Though finally released in Nov 2020, the Cultural Revolution-backdropped film was abruptly pulled from the 69th Berlin International Film Festival for "technical reasons".
Friends: The Reunion	2021	United States	Chinese streaming sites Youku, iQIYI, and Tencent Video have removed scenes featuring Lady Gaga, Justin Bieber, and BTS. While it's unclear who had ordered the cut, Lady Gaga has been banned following her 2016 meeting with Dalai Lama. Justin Bieber was also banned from performing in China, with authorities blaming his "bad behavior" in 2017. BTS faced boycott calls in China in 2020 after band member RM endorsed the alliance between the United States and South Korea during Korean War.
Fight Club	2022	United States	Originally released in 1999, but released in China in 2022. This release of the film features an altered ending: a text screen explaining that the authorities triumphed after figuring out Project Mayhem's plan, and that Tyler Durden was committed to a psychiactric institution. This prompted backlash and the film's original ending was subsequently restored.
Minions: The Rise of Gru	2022	United States	Minions: The Rise of Gru was released in China with an altered ending akin to the altered Fight Club ending; a text screen is shown instead, explaining that Wild Knuckles was arrested and sentenced to twenty years in prison, pursued his love of acting and started his own theater troupe, while Gru "returned to his family".
Lord of War	2022	United States	Originally released in 2005, but released in China in 2022. This release of the film cuts the final 30 minutes from the film and replaces it with a text screen summary stating that Yuri Orlov confessed to all crimes and was sentenced to life in prison.

=== Run time shortened by the producer and/or the distributor to ensure the profit of Chinese movie theaters ===
Title	Release year in mainland China	Country of origin	Notes
The Matrix Reloaded	2003	Australia, United States	
Resident Evil: Afterlife	2010	United States, Germany, Canada, Japan, United Kingdom	
Prometheus	2012	United Kingdom, United States	
The Company You Keep	2012	United States	Mr. Jiao, a publicist for the film's Chinese distributor, told Xiaoxiang Morning Newspaper that 23 minutes were cut for commercial reasons. Despite that, the scheduling for the film in Changsha was not satisfactory. Subsequently, the June 2017 notice from SAPPRFT banned the spread of so-called complete or uncut versions.
Dhoom 3	2013	India	Mr. Peng, a manager of a local cinema in Changsha, told Xiaoxiang Morning News that the three-hour film was too long for Chinese audiences. Subsequently, the June 2017 notice from SAPPRFT banned the spread of so-called complete or uncut versions.
Resident Evil: Retribution	2013	Germany, United States, Canada, Japan	
American Hustle	2014	United States	It was reported that local distributors, not SAPPRFT, were behind the trimming of 30 minutes. Subsequently, the June 2017 notice from SAPPRFT banned the spread of so-called complete or uncut versions.
Fury	2014	United States	
Rush	2015	United Kingdom, Germany, United States	
Allied	2016	United Kingdom, United States	
Dangal	2017	India	Although China Film Insider reported that the 20+ minute cut was not forced by the censor, the June 2017 notice from SAPPRFT banned the spread of so-called complete or uncut versions.
The Lost City of Z	2017	United States	It was reported that unnamed sources claimed the 37-minute trimmings were made by the film's producers, not by SAPPRFT. Subsequently, the June 2017 notice from SAPPRFT banned the spread of so-called complete or uncut versions.
Deadpool & Wolverine	2024	United States	Certain "bawdy language and crass dialogue" are removed, while "euphemisms for narcotics and certain body parts" are kept. Translated Chinese subtitles help soften the literal lines.
Deadpool 2	2018	United States	While the original version was not shown in China, the PG-13 version called Once Upon a Deadpool was released to be palatable to the censors, but retitled to Deadpool 2: I Love My Family.
Together	2025	United States, Australia	Gay couple scene was changed to heterosexual couple scene thru artificial intelligence by local distributor to appease the censor.
Fantastic Beasts: The Secrets of Dumbledore	2022	United States, Britain	Warner Bros. removed two lines of dialogue between Albus Dumbledore and Gellert Grindelwald that alluded to their past gay romance.

== See also ==
- Chinese censorship abroad
- List of TV and films with critiques of Chinese Communist Party

== Note ==
Original Titles in Chinese.

== Bibliography ==
- Teo, Stephen (2009). "Reactions Against the Wuxia Genre". Chinese Martial Arts Cinema: The Wuxia Tradition. Edinburgh University Press. pp. 38–53. ISBN 978-0748632862.
- Bai, S. (2013). Recent developments in the Chinese film censorship system [PDF file]. Retrieved from https://opensiuc.lib.siu.edu/cgi/viewcontent.cgi?article=1478&context=gs_rp.
- Canaves, S. (2016). Trends in Chinese film law and regulation. ChinaFilmInsider. Retrieved from http://chinafilminsider.com/trends-in-chinese-film-law-and-regulation/.
- GBTIMES Beijing. (2017). China launches first film censorship law. GBTimes. Retrieved from https://gbtimes.com/china-launches-first-film-censorship-law.
- Weiying Peng (2015). "3" (PDF). China, Film Coproduction and Soft Power Competition (doctor thesis). Queensland University of Technology. Archived (PDF) from the original on November 3, 2018.
