= I Love You (2002 film) =

- Film poster
- Traditional Chinese: 我愛你
- Simplified Chinese: 我爱你
- Hanyu Pinyin: Wǒ aì nǐ
- Directed by: Zhang Yuan
- Written by: Zhang Yuan; Wang Shuo; Xia Wei
- Starring: Xu Jinglei; Tong Dawei
- Cinematography: Zhang Jian
- Edited by: Wu Yixiang
- Music by: Zhang Yadong
- Production companies: Xi'an Film Studio; Jewel Film Investment Company
- Distributed by: Asian Union Film & Entertainment
- Release date: October 2002 (China)
- Running time: 97 minutes
- Country: China
- Language: Mandarin
- Box office: >$1.2 million

I Love You is a 2002 (Note: Several sources refer to this as a 2003 release (notably the Internet Movie Database). In reality, the film was made primarily in 2002 and was released in several international film festivals late that year, including Pusan.) Chinese drama film directed by Zhang Yuan and starring Xu Jinglei and Tong Dawei. The film was a co-production between the Xi'an Film Studio and Jewel Film Investment Company.

It is one of three films made by Zhang in 2002 (the other two being a film of the 1964 communist opera Jiang jie, and the romantic comedy, Green Tea) marking one of the more prolific periods in his career. I Love You is based on author Wang Shuo's novel Get a Kick and Die. Zhang would again adapt one of Wang's stories in 2006's Little Red Flowers.

== Plot ==
Du Xiaoju and Wang Yi are two people in their 20s living in contemporary Beijing. As the film opens, Xiaoju is about to marry one of Yi's friends. Before the day of the wedding, her fiancé inadvertently commits suicide by diving into an empty swimming pool while drunk. Devastated, Xiaoju becomes increasingly close to Wang Yi, which causes them to fall in love and marry.

The honeymoon period between Xiaoju and Yi proves short, however, as Xiaoju begins to exhibit increasingly unbalanced behavior. She teases her husband about harboring a crush on her former roommate, and interrogates him on his former partners. Soon, the teasing erupts into public rows, much to the consternation of their friend, Pan Youjun. As Xiaoju becomes convinced that her husband no longer loves her, her behavior become erratic, obsessive, and ultimately dangerous.

== Cast ==
- Xu Jinglei as Du Xiaoju (the wife)
- Tong Dawei as Wang Yi (the husband)
- Du Peng as Pan Youjun (the married friend of Wang Yi and Du Xiaoju)
- Pan Juan as Jia Ling (Du Xiaoju's roommate at the hospital)
- Hou Junjie as Pan's wife

== Production ==
By the early 2000s, Zhang Yuan had decided to make a romance film, a genre he had never tackled before. Upon mentioning this to his friend, author Wang Shuo, the latter suggested that he adapt one of his old novels, Get a Kick and Die (sometimes translated as Live it up before You Die). Reading the book, Zhang agreed, though he moved the story's action forward from the 1980s to present day Beijing. While Zhang had worked with major authors before (notably Yu Hua and Zhu Wen in 1999's Seventeen Years), I Love You marked the first time Zhang would directly adapt a literary work.

Filming took only a month, and the entire shoot used only a single camera. Zhang has noted that he chose this style of filming in part to utilize long-takes. Additionally, it allowed him to focus on single characters while filming, with reactions of other characters only being implied by the reactions by the camera's subject. Even though I Love You was an adaptation, Zhang approached the film with total freedom of creativity, in part because he found the story very realistic. In an interview, Zhang noted that filming the two main characters was like shooting a documentary, noting that the shoot "recaptured the same mindset that [he] had on Sons."

Zhang has spoken about what he was attempting to capture for the film:

"I wanted [the actors] to capture the depression, the psychological imbalance, and mixture of love and hate that so many people experience when they are caught up in a difficult relationship. At the same time, I also wanted their performances to reflect the almost schizophrenic division symptomatic of living during these times in this society."

== Reception ==
Unlike many of Zhang's earlier works (notably Beijing Bastards and East Palace, West Palace), I Love You was released domestically in China in late October 2002. By November 2002, I Love You had grossed nearly 10 million RMB ($1.2m), thus making it Zhang's biggest commercial success yet. Internationally, the film has also done well, premiering at many major film festivals including Sundance, Rotterdam, Karlovy Vary, Deauville, and Pusan.

Like his previous film, Seventeen Years, Zhang Yuan's foray into mainstream movie making has been both praised and criticized. While Derek Elley of Variety argues that the film represents a move towards "maturity," Richard James Havis of The Hollywood Reporter takes an opposite tack, arguing that the film's lack of political grounding and mainstream nature leaves it a "cold romantic thriller" that "lacks the emotional muscle" to appeal to international audiences.

== Theme song ==
The theme song "Wo Ai Ni" (我爱你; "I Love You") was composed by Zhang Yadong, written by Xiao Wei (肖玮) of Catcher in the Rye and performed by Faye Wong. It was included in Zhang's 2009 album Underflow (潜流).
