= List of Chinese films of 1996 =

Mainland Chinese films released in 1996

A list of mainland Chinese films released in 1996:

Title	Director	Cast	Genre	Notes
Cello in a Cab	Guan Hu	Geng Le, Kong Lin	Drama	Also known as The Street Rhapsody
East Palace, West Palace	Zhang Yuan	Hu Jun, Si Han	Drama	One of the first Chinese films to address LGBT issues, screened at Cannes
The Emperor's Shadow	Zhou Xiaowen	Ge You, Jiang Wen	Historical/Drama	
Farewell Our 1948	Guan Hu		Drama	
The King of Masks	Wu Tianming	Zhu Xu	Drama	
Living Dream	Hu Xueyang		Drama	
Signal Left, Turn Right	Huang Jianxin, Yang Yazhou	Ding Jiali	Comedy	
The Singer	Huo Jianqi			
Sons	Zhang Yuan		Docudrama	Tiger Award winner at the 1996 International Film Festival Rotterdam
A Story of Xiangxiang	Teng Wenji		Drama	
The Strangers in Beijing	He Qun		Drama	
Sun Valley	He Ping	Zhang Fengyi	Drama/Western	Entered into the 46th Berlin International Film Festival
Temptress Moon	Chen Kaige	Gong Li, Leslie Cheung	Historical/Drama/Romance	Entered into the 1996 Cannes Film Festival
Touching Starlight		Zhang Ziyi		

== See also ==
- 1996 in China
