= Seventeen Years (film) =

- Film poster
- Traditional Chinese: 過年回家
- Simplified Chinese: 过年回家
- Hanyu Pinyin: guò nián huí jiā
- Directed by: Zhang Yuan
- Written by: Ning Dai; Yu Hua; Zhu Wen
- Produced by: Zhang Yuan; Willy Tsao; Zhang Peimin
- Starring: Li Jun; Li Bingbing; Liu Lin
- Cinematography: Zhang Xigui
- Edited by: Jacopo Quadri; Zhang Yuan
- Music by: Zhao Jiping
- Production companies: Keetman Limited; Fabrica; Xi'an Film Studio
- Distributed by: Celluloid Dreams
- Release date: September 1999 (Venice)
- Running time: 90 minutes
- Country: China
- Language: Mandarin

Seventeen Years (simplified Chinese: 过年回家; traditional Chinese: 過年回家; pinyin: guò nián huí jiā; lit. 'New Year Homecoming') is a 1999 Chinese film directed by Zhang Yuan and starring Li Bingbing in her feature film debut. Seventeen Years was screened at several international film festivals where it garnered numerous accolades, including the Silver Lion for Best Direction at the 56th Venice International Film Festival.

The film is co-produced by Keetman Limited (China) and Fabrica (Italy), as presented by Keetman and the Xi'an Film Studio. It premiered concurrently with Zhang Yuan's documentary feature, Crazy English in the 1999 Locarno International Film Festival.

Seventeen Years is seen, at least by some critics, as Zhang Yuan's move away from his "Bad Boy" image, an image that was cultivated after run-ins with Chinese authorities with his previous films, Beijing Bastards, and the homosexual-themed East Palace, West Palace. In contrast, Seventeen Years (and Crazy English) was produced under the aegis of the Chinese bureaucracy, though some editing of the film was required before it could be released.

== Cast ==
- Li Jun as Tao Xiaolan, a young woman whose accidental murder of her stepsister leads to a seventeen-year prison sentence.
- Li Bingbing as Chen Jie, a prison guard who takes pity on Xiaolan and helps her find her parents.
- Liu Lin as Yu Xiaoqin, Xiaolan's stepsister.
- Liang Song as Father
- Le Yeping as Mother

== Plot ==
The film takes place in and around the city of Tianjin, in northeastern China. Two divorced singles (Liang Song and Le Yeping), marry, each bringing a daughter into their new home. Xiaolan (Li Jun), short haired is fiercely independent and wishes to work in a factory after she graduates from high school. Her stepsister, Xiaoqin (Liu Lin), is more intellectual, and wishes to enter a university. After a dispute over a mere 5 yuan that Xiaoqin accuses Xiaolan of stealing, Xiaolan hits her stepsister over the head. To the surprise of everyone, Xiaoqin succumbs to the injury and dies and Xiaolan is led to jail.

The film then cuts seventeen years into the future. Xiaolan has been selected as one of the lucky inmates allowed a furlough during the New Year holiday. At the same time, a young prison guard, Chen Jie (Li Bingbing) is calling her mother to say that she will soon be returning home for the holiday. While waiting for the inmates to be picked up by their families, Chen Jie notices that soon only Xiaolan remains. In an act of charity, Chen Jie offers to help Xiaolan return home. Upon arriving at her old apartment, however, both women discover that the home has long since been torn down, and Xiaolan's parents moved to another part of the city. Chen Jie, however, is now determined that Xiaolan will spend the holiday with her family and the two set out in search of parents who may not want to see their only daughter...

== Production ==
The idea for Seventeen Years is said to have emerged after Zhang Yuan watched a television program of a criminal's reunion with his family after many years in prison. Realizing that every prisoner likely had an intricate story, Zhang began to research for a possible film by interviewing several inmates. From this starting point, Seventeen Years eventually shifted its focus from a film about an inmate within the prison walls, to one about a former inmate attempting to reconnect with her family. A screenplay was written by Zhang with the collaboration of the established writers Yu Hua and Zhu Wen and Zhang's wife, Ning Dai. Yu and Zhu never worked directly with each other, as Zhang asked each to submit a separate draft, which he later edited and consolidated to fit with his concept of the film. Filmed primarily in Tianjin, China, Seventeen Years's post-production took place entirely in Italy with editing by Zhang and Jacobo Quadri (who would also work with Zhang on his film Little Red Flowers). As Zhang's "return to the fold," Seventeen Years did not suffer from the usual governmental intrusion. However, Zhang was asked to explain certain scenes and implement some minor changes, which he did with little protest. Even then, the review process lasted an entire year before the film was allowed to be shown in theaters.

After spending much of his career as the archetypal "underground Chinese filmmaker," Zhang approached Seventeen Years as the film that would finally be screened in China. Zhang felt that Seventeen Years would have a good chance of achieving this goal, in part because the film already needed government approval to film within the prison. Indeed, it was reportedly the first Chinese film allowed to shoot within an active Chinese prison.

== Reception ==
Seventeen Years (and to a lesser extent Crazy English) marked a first for Zhang Yuan as the first film directed by Zhang that could be seen by domestic Chinese audiences in theaters.

=== Awards and nominations ===
- 56th Venice Film Festival, Italy, 1999
  - Special Director's Award— Zhang Yuan
- Gijon Film Festival, Spain, 1999
  - Best Director — Zhang Yuan
- Singapore Film Festival, 2000
  - Best Director — Zhang Yuan
  - Best Actress (tied) — Liu Lin & Li Bingbing
- Fajr Film Festival, Iran 2001
  - Crystal Simorgh for Best Screenplay

== DVD release ==
Seventeen Years was released on Region 1 DVD in the United States on April 5, 2005 by Kino International. The DVD has an aspect ratio of 1.66:1 and features the original Mandarin dialogue with English subtitles.
