= Green Tea (film) =

2003 Chinese film by Zhang Yuan

- Green Tea movie poster
- Traditional Chinese: 綠茶
- Simplified Chinese: 绿茶
- Hanyu Pinyin: Lǜ Chá
- Directed by: Zhang Yuan
- Written by: Tang Danian; Zhang Yuan; Jin Renshun (novel)
- Produced by: Yan Gang
- Starring: Jiang Wen; Zhao Wei
- Cinematography: Christopher Doyle
- Edited by: Wu Yixiang
- Music by: Cong Su
- Distributed by: Asian Union Film & Entertainment
- Release date: 18 August 2003 (China)
- Running time: 83 minutes
- Country: China
- Language: Mandarin

Green Tea (simplified Chinese: 绿茶; traditional Chinese: 綠茶; pinyin: Lǜ Chá) is a 2003 Chinese romantic drama film. It was adapted from the novel Adiliya by the River by Jin Renshun. Shot in the summer of 2002, Green Tea was one of three films directed by Zhang Yuan that year (including the earlier I Love You and the subsequent Jiang Jie). The film was photographed by established Hong Kong-cinematographer Christopher Doyle, whose work gives Green Tea a more polished look than many of Zhang's earlier independent features.

== Plot ==
Shy, ordinary, and glasses wearing Wu Fang is a graduate student at Beijing University who goes on a sequence of blind dates despite never successfully attracting a partner. She always orders a glass of green tea, and is perceptive, nuanced, and quietly pretty, though this goes unnoticed with the men, who are often curt and uninterested, put off by her conservative clothing and awkward demeanor. In the entire movie, Wu Fang never talks about herself, choosing instead to only muse about a friend she has.

On the next date, she meets Chen Minglian and discusses how her friend is clairvoyant, and can read a stranger's fortune by swirling and observing their tea glass, which Mingliang scoffs at. After more unappetizing conversation, Wu Fang slaps him after he makes a perverted suggestion, and the two part ways. However Mingliang manages to find Fang in places around her school campus, first to her irritation, but after a more conversing she begins to warm up to him. Wu Fang is revealed to have a gentle humor. She also discloses that the one thing she hates is when men hit women.

Through these conversations, the backstory of Fang's fortune-telling friend is revealed. She describes her friend as someone who can make even smoking cigarettes look graceful and beautiful, who changes boyfriends faster than the weather, and whose father is extremely terrifying, whom she met on one occasion. Her friend's mother was a make-up artist at a morgue, a fact that she had kept secret from her husband until after they were married and daughter were born. Upon discovering the truth, he descended into alcoholism and violence.

Over the course of several conversations, Wu Fang divulges further that he forced his wife to wear gloves at all times, even in sleep, claiming that they smelled of death. He would neurotically declare that his wife's hands (and synecdochically her profession) were destroying his life between drunk beatings to both her and his daughter. The story ends when one night the father attempted to rape her mother while she was cooking and the friend ended up accidentally piercing his throat with a potato peeler, which resulted in the father's death and mother's conviction for murder and imprisonment until this day. Fang laughs and adds that the story was fictional the whole time. Mingliang grows equally entranced with both the story and Wu Fang, who does not reciprocate and has mysterious commitments at night.

At the same time, Mingliang's artist friend Jun has been trying to set him up with a sultry piano player in a lounge who is known to date anyone but only once. The musician, Lang Lang (also Zhao Wei) bears a striking similarity to Wu Fang, but without glasses, and Mingliang is at first adamantly convinced that they are the same person. Lang Lang laughs it off and kisses him on the cheek. Still unconvinced by the uncanny resemblance between the two women, Mingliang snatches Wu Fang's glasses off her face, to which she overreacts and leaves. For a few days, Wu Fang disappears which gives Mingliang and Lang Lang time to date and converse, in which her obvious beauty, easy laugh, smoking habit, and graceful confidence with men distinguish her entirely from Wu Fang. Though Mingliang is charmed by her, his mind cannot help but think of Wu Fang, who comes back from her trip, only to disappear again.

Lang Lang casually mentions that her father was a discontented "one hit wonder" composer who was violent at home. Mingliang asks her what her mother did for work, and she replies that she supervised a glove factory.

When Jun plans a couples dinner party, and Wu Fang is still nowhere to be found. Mingliang finds Lang Lang and asks her to pose as Wu Fang for just the night. There she performs a fortune telling via the leaves in her green tea. Insecure of Lang Lang's beauty and her boyfriend's obvious lust, Jun's girlfriend drunkenly attempts to flirt with Mingliang and incite drama with Lang Lang, which does not phase either, but results in Jun slapping her. Lang Lang approaches Jun and slaps him in return, stating that the thing she hates most is when men hit women.

The film ends somewhat ambiguously. Mingliang and Lang Lang get a hotel room. A time lapse filmed with a camera underneath a translucent glass table plays out, where Mingliang and Wu Fang are above it talking, and her glasses are on the table next to a glass of green tea.

== Cast ==
- Jiang Wen as Chen Mingliang, one of Wu Fang's blind dates.
- Zhao Wei as:
  - Wu Fang, the college student who always reads tea leaves to determine the quality of her blind dates.
  - Langlang, a hotel pianist who may or may not be Wu Fang.

== Reception ==
- "Zhao is especially good in the Wu role, turning her from a potential caricature (glasses, upswept hair, tightly wrapped) into a flesh-and-blood character in need of a man who'll genuinely care for her. Jiang, too, is good at showing the cracks behind his buccaneering front, slightly recalling his bruised macho turn in Zhang Yimou's Beijing comedy "Keep Cool." For students of ocular acting, both Zhao and Jiang provide a field day."--Variety
- "The delicately featured Zhao Wei balances a subtle and maddening allure with a hint of intellectual aggression; the seeming effortlessness of her performance translates directly to the characters of the two women. In the end we never know who they really are and whether there's a link, but Zhang suggests Minliang will spend the rest of his life trying to figure them out. It used to be that in cinema, French actresses seemed to have the sole right to this kind of femme. Now they have some competition."--Japan Times
