= List of films banned in China =

This list details banned movies that are not allowed to be shown in cinemas, TV stations, or on the Internet in China because they are accused by the government of the People's Republic of China of violating relevant laws and regulations, or because of other political factors.

Article 24 of China's "Regulations on the Administration of Movies" stipulates that "films that have not been censored by the film censorship agency of the State Council's administrative department of radio, film and television (hereinafter referred to as the film censorship agency) shall not be distributed, shown, imported or exported.

== Definition ==
The following is as broad a definition of a prohibited film as possible, and one of the following definitions is considered a prohibited work.

- Illegal films are defined in Interpretation of Regulations on the Administration of Movies as "films that have not been approved for public exhibition by the competent state administrative authorities," or "banned films" in the common sense. Such films have not been censored or have skipped censorship, such as being entered into overseas film festivals without being submitted for review, or having illegal content or process.
- In 1994, the Ministry of Radio, Film and Television issued the "Notice on the Prohibition of Supporting and Assisting Zhang Yuan and Others to Make Films and Post-Processing", in which the illegal films mentioned in the file were marked as XXX. This was a ban on the production of films by drama groups; or the media used XX as the name of the film instead.
- Zhang Xianmin, "The History of Banned Films in Mainland China after 90": Banned film, is a title. A prohibited film. The range of prohibited actions are as follows.
1. Prohibition of filming
2. Prohibition of distribution
3. Prohibition of publicity
4. Prohibition of the person concerned to continue working in the film industry, etc.

== Banned films ==
=== 1949–1995 ===
After the founding of the People's Republic of China, the Chinese film industry was reconstructed after the Soviet system, and the film production and distribution system was implemented in a "government-enterprise" manner, producing and distributing films according to administrative directives. After the films were produced, they were censored by the Film Office or a higher state agency, and the films that passed the censorship were acquired by government-run distribution and projection companies for nationwide distribution and screening.

Title	Time	Director	Actor	Description	Douban Page
Sorrows of the Forbidden City 清宫秘史	Released in 1948 (Hong Kong); Released in 1950 (China); Banned in 1950	Zhu Shilin	Shu Shi, Zhou Xuan, Tang Ruojing, Hong Bo	The film was made by Hong Kong Wing Wah Pictures in December 1948 and started to be screened in Beijing and Shanghai in March 1950, but was banned on May 3, 1950, because Mao Zedong called it a "traitorous film".	1439106
Sun and Man 太阳和人	Banned in 1981	Peng Ning	Liu Wenzhi, Huang Meiying		2200853
Wind of early summer 初夏的风	Banned in 1982	Peng Ning, He Ping	Wang Mingming, Shen Hong	The film was shot in 1982, but was later banned, the reason for which is still unknown.	4154640
Flying the Flag of the Republic 飘扬，共和国的旗帜	–	Propaganda Department of the Political Work Department of the People's Liberation Army	–	Filmed in 1989, the documentary deals with the 1989 Tiananmen Square protests and massacre from the viewpoint of the Chinese Communist Party. After the Chinese government moved towards a total media blackout on the events, the movie was censored. Today, the documentary is effectively banned within China and not available in any Chinese video-sharing websites.	None
The Blue Kite 蓝风筝	1993 at Foreign Film Festival	Tian Zhuangzhuang	Lü Liping, Pu Quanxin, Li Xuejian, Guo Baochang	Filmed in 1992, the film involved several political movements in the early years of the People's Republic of China, and was entered into the 1993 Tokyo Film Festival without passing the censorship. The Chinese film delegation boycotted by withdrawing from the festival.	None
To Live 活着	1994	Zhang Yimou	Ge You, Gong Li, Niu Ben, Guo Tao, Jiang Wu	The film was banned the same year of its release due to how it portrays events such as the Great Leap Forward and the Cultural Revolution.	1292365
The Gate of Heavenly Peace 天安门	US premiere in October 1995	Carma Hinton, Richard Gordon	Dai Qing	It deals with the 1989 Tiananmen Square protests and massacre, which is considered a sensitive topic in China. The documentary was strongly boycotted by Chinese officials, who demanded that the film be withdrawn from the New York Film Festival. When negotiations failed, the Chinese side withdrew their entries and the Chinese directors withdrew from the competition. The documentary was only screened in Hong Kong.	None

=== 1996–2001 ===
During this period, the "Regulations on the Administration of Movies" began to be implemented. In addition to the fact that the production unit must review itself before submitting it for review, it must also submit it to the State Administration of Radio, Film and Television (SARFT) for the filing. Films that have been shot or imported from foreign countries will all be submitted for review, and only after approval can a "Film Public Screening Permit" be obtained. Chinese films are shown in gray background and ordered chronologically.

Title	Year	Director	Actor	Status	Banned Description	Douban Page
Seven Years in Tibet	1997	Jean-Jacques Annaud	Brad Pitt, David Thewlis	Official ban	The film was condemned by the government of the People's Republic of China, which stated that Communist Chinese military officers were intentionally shown as rude and arrogant, brutalizing the local people. The Chinese government also decried the film's positive portrayal of the 14th Dalai Lama. All future films produced by Sony were banned from playing in China. Annaud, Pitt, and Thewlis were initially banned from ever entering China. However, Annaud was since welcomed back to China in 2012 to chair the jury of the 15th annual Shanghai International Film Festival. In addition, Pitt subsequently visited China in 2014 and 2016. Sony was allowed to resume business in China in 1998.	
Red Corner	1997	Jon Avnet	Richard Gere, Bai Ling, Bradley Whitford	Official ban	The film was banned for its negative portrayal of China's judicial system. The State Administration of Radio and Television (SARFT) sent a memorandum to Jack Valenti, president of the Motion Picture Association of America (MPAA), and sent a letter to major Chinese studios requesting not to cooperate with MGM/United Artists, which produced Red Corner, arguing that the said film "maliciously attacked China".	None
Kundun	1997	Martin Scorsese	–	Official ban	The film was banned its depiction of the annexation of Tibet by the People's Republic of China and its positive portrayal of the Dalai Lama. Disney produced and distributed the film despite objections China voiced during production, causing China to issue a temporary ban on all Disney films. The ban ended in 1999 with the release of Mulan, and the studio issued an apology during the early negotiation process to build Shanghai Disney Resort.	None
Xiu Xiu: The Sent Down Girl 天浴	1998	Joan Chen	Li Xiaolu, Lopsang	Prohibition of filming	The content involves sensitive subjects of the Cultural Revolution and contains nude scenes. Joan Chen was banned from filming for three years for "illegally making films and participating in exhibitions abroad".	None
Inside the DMZ 北纬38度线	2000	Wei Lian, Shi Wei, etc.	Ding Xiaoyi, Zhang Yiming, etc.	Prohibition of screening	The Korean War film was shot at the August 1st Film Studio. The film was not screened together with the Chinese Central Television's TV drama "Resisting the U.S. in Korea", which was produced in the same year.	10535442
Suzhou River 苏州河	2000	Lou Ye	Zhou Xun, Jia Hongsheng	Prohibition of screening	On September 7, 2000, the film was released in Hong Kong and won the Golden Tiger Award at the 29th Rotterdam International Film Festival and the Best Film Award at the 15th Paris International Film Festival. The film was banned by the SARFT from being screened in mainland China because it was not submitted for review and joined the foreign film festival.	1299661
Kiss of the Dragon	2001	Chris Nahon	Jet Li, Bridget Fonda	Prohibition of screening	There was information that the film was planned to be released in China, but it was not released allegedly because of the controversial murder scenario.	1299335
Shaolin Soccer 少林足球	2001	Stephen Chow	Stephen Chow,Zhao Wei, Ng Man-tat	Prohibition of screening	The film is a co-production and is prohibited from being shown in mainland China because it was released in Hong Kong before it was approved by the SARFT. The main producers of "Shaolin Soccer" have also suspended the various film businesses of Hong Kong Xinghui Company and Huanyu Company in the mainland.	1297747

=== 2002–2017 ===
The new version of the Regulations on the Administration of Movies, which came into effect on February 1, 2002, adding prohibited content, and added a detailed and lengthy explanation for this in the Interpretation of the Film Management Regulations. Chinese films are shown in gray background. Sorted chronologically.

Title	Year	Director	Actor	Status	Banned Description	Douban Page
Blind Shaft 盲井	2003	Li Yang	Li Yixiang, Wang Shuangbao, Wang Baoqiang	Unlicensed and prohibition of screening	Considering that it was impossible to pass the review, the director decided to shoot the film on his own, and was subsequently banned from screening, and the director himself was regarded as an "outcast".	None
Lara Croft: Tomb Raider – The Cradle of Life	2003	Jan de Bont	Angelina Jolie, Gerard Butler, Ciarán Hinds, Simon Yam	Unpassing of review	The reviewer told the media that he thought the film maligned the Chinese people, Chinese culture, and Chinese society. China became the only country in Asia to ban the film.	1307657
Memoirs of a Geisha	2005	Rob Marshall	Zhang Ziyi	Prohibition of screening	The film was originally scheduled to be approved in November 2005, but in January 2006, the SARFT failed to issue a screening permit. When asked by a reporter whether the film had passed the censorship process, the person in charge said "no comment". After 25 January, Memoirs of a Geisha was banned from screening in theatres in mainland China. Mao Yu, director of the Film Council's publicity department, said the film was "sensitive and complex". The media pointed out Zhang Ziyi's role involving nudity and allusions to prostitution, and also a scene in which she bathes with a Japanese man as reasons for the ban, and that a Chinese actress plays a Japanese geisha.	
Summer Palace 颐和园	2006	Lou Ye	Guo Xiaodong, Hao Lei, Hu Lingling	Prohibition of filming and of screening	The film was rejected by the Film Office for "technical reasons", and the film's director, Lou Ye, and producer, Nai An, were fined by the Film Office on September 1, 2006, for participating in the 59th Cannes Film Festival without a public release permit, in violation of the Regulations on the Administration of Movies.	None
Lost in Beijing 苹果	2007-05-18; 2008-01-03	Li Yu	Tony Leung Ka-fai, Fan Bingbing, Tong Dawei, Elaine Jin	Passing of review later banned	The film was granted a public release permit and its public release version was an audited version, but its online version, DVD version, and overseas version contained unaudited scenes. The film was accused of violating the Regulations on the Administration of Movies and the Advertising Law, including adding unaudited pornographic clips to the online and DVD versions, using unaudited versions to participate in overseas film festivals, and for advertising reasons. The main penalties include: revocation of the public screening license, confiscation of the unaudited copies of the films and related materials, suspension of their distribution and screening, and cessation of their online distribution; cancellation of Beijing Laureate Film's film production license for two years; and restriction of Laureate Film's legal representative Fang Li from engaging in related film business for two years.	1966464
Shinjuku Incident 新宿事件	2008	Derek Yee	Jackie Chan, Naoto Takenaka, Xu Jinglei, Daniel Wu, Fan Bingbing, Masaya Kato	Unpassing of review	The film was a co-production, but due to the gory and violent scenes, the film failed to pass the inspection of the Film Office, and the film makers thought that the modification of these scenes would seriously affect the whole film's plot system, so they gave up the modification and did not send the film for review.	2209368
The Sun Behind the Clouds	2009	Ritu Sarin, Tenzing Sonam	Main Interviews: Dalai Lama, Tenzing Sonam	Official ban	The Chinese government considers it to be a documentary film on Tibetan independence. The Chinese director Lu Chuan and others withdrew from the Palm Springs International Film Festival after being informed of the film's participation.	None
The 10 Conditions of Love	2009	Jeff Daniels	Rebiya Kadeer	Official ban	The Chinese government accuses Rebiya of being the leader of the "Xinjiang independence" and "East Turkistan" forces in exile. After the July 5 Incident in Ürümqi in 2009, the consul of the Cultural Department of the Chinese Consulate General in Melbourne learned that the documentary film would be screened at the Melbourne International Film Festival and made a personal phone call to the festival's director and executive director, Richard Moore, requesting that the film be taken down from the festival, but was refused. A number of Chinese directors, including Jia Zhangke, Tang Xiaobai, and Zhao Liang, announced their departure from the festival after learning of the film's screening.	None
Mao's Last Dancer	2009	Bruce Beresford	Joan Chen, Bruce Greenwood, Kyle MacLachlan	Prohibition of screening	The film deals with the defection of Li Cunxin in 1981. Due to political sensitivity, it was not allowed to be shown in China.	None
Piercing I 刺痛我	2010	Liu Jian	–	Unlicensed	The film is an animated film. According to the director, Ms. Miriam, he was not aware of the film industry at the time and "did not have the awareness to apply for the 'Dragon Label'", so he did not prepare the film in advance and did not plan to obtain a film public screening permit for the film. The film premiered at the Annecy International Animation Film Festival in France on June 12, 2010, and later won the Asia Pacific Screen Award for Best Animated Feature Film.	4894072
The Ditch 夹边沟	2010	Wang Bing	Lu Ye, Xu Cenzi, Cheng Zhengwu, Yang Haoyu	Unlicensed and prohibition of screening	The film participated in the 2010 Toronto International Film Festival, telling the story of more than 3,000 people who were sent to Jiabiangou labor camp in Gansu due to the anti-rightist movement from 1957 to 1960, and more than half of them starved to death. Because of the cruel plot, it did not obtain a public screening license in China, and it circulated in the form of pirated copies.	Deleted
The Lady	2011	Luc Besson	Michelle Yeoh, David Thewlis, Jonathan Woodhouse	Prohibition of publicity	It was alleged that some of the contents were involved in violations, and the news, footage, and videos of the film were not allowed to be promoted and advertised in any form.	Deleted
KANO	2014	Umin Boya	Masatoshi Nagase, Tsao Yu-ning, etc.	Official ban	The movie depicts the story of the Kano baseball team during the Japanese colonial period in Taiwan. A picture was circulated on Sina Weibo showing a notice from the censorship department of Hainan, requesting the province not to speculate on the Taiwanese film KANO and its winning of the 51st Golden Horse Awards, nor to broadcast live video and graphics of the award ceremony that day. The notice was forwarded from an order from the publicity department of the State Administration of Press, Publication, Radio, Film, and Television. A Guangdong TV station told Ming Pao that the Golden Horse Film Festival had a tendency to glorify Japan and did not mention the title of the KANO film. Director Ma Zhixiang claimed that he was not aware that the film had been banned by the Chinese authorities, but also said that it was a Taiwanese story and did not care if it was blocked.	None
Paradise in Service 軍中樂園	2014	Doze Niu	Ethan Juan, Ivy Chen, Chen Jianbin, Wan Qian	Unpassing of review	The Taiwanese film, which premiered in Taiwan on September 5, 2014, was sent for review in China but failed to pass according to director Niu Chengzhe.	20515070
Human Harvest	2014	Leon Lee	David Kilgour, David Matas	Prohibition of publicity	The film is a documentary about alleged Organ harvesting from Falun Gong practitioners in China. In 2018, the Chinese Permanent Mission to the United Nations in Geneva held a media conference to refute the allegations of organ transplantation, saying that the documentary was so absurd as to be "not worth refuting". The content of the documentary has not been reported in major Chinese media and is suspected to be banned.	None
The Chinese Mayor 大同	2015	Zhou Hao	–	Prohibition of publicity	The documentary dealt with the sensitive issue of the demolition of the city of Datong, and was subsequently banned by the Chinese government. The actual mayor of Datong, Geng Yanbo, could only be likened in the Chinese media to Li Dakang, the municipal Party Committee Secretary in another related drama film, In the Name of the People.	Deleted
Under the Dome 穹顶之下	2015	Chai Jing	–	Official ban	The film is a documentary about air pollution in China from the perspective of haze. As of March 2, 2015, the total number of views on major video websites in China was about to exceed 200 million, and it was completely blocked by the Publicity Department of the Chinese Communist Party on March 3. The reasons for this are unknown.	Deleted
Ten Years 十年	2015	Kwok Zune, Wong Fei-pang,Jevons Au, Kiwi Chow, Ng Ka-leung	Liu Kai-chi, Kin-Ping Leung, Catherine Chau, Neo Yau, Ng Siu-hin	Prohibition of publicity	The film was selected as the Best Picture at the 35th Hong Kong Film Awards, which aroused public discontent in China. The Global Times criticized the film as a "prophetic fantasy", "and an extremely pessimistic account of Hong Kong in 2025", and directed it to "promote despair". Afterwards, the SAPPRFT ordered all internet platforms to stop broadcasting the Hong Kong Film Awards.	None
Behemoth 悲兮魔兽	2015	Zhao Liang	–	Prohibition of screening	The documentary film was featured in the media as a finalist in the main competition of the 72nd Venice Film Festival in 2015. The film was banned by the local government of Inner Mongolia through the national security system due to the exposure of pneumoconiosis in Inner Mongolia mines, making the film only available for small-scale screening in Beijing.	None
Deadpool	2016	Tim Miller	Ryan Reynolds, Morena Baccarin, etc.	Unpassing of review	The American superhero movie, which was intended to be introduced to China, was not approved because of its realistic violence and nudity.	3718279
Trivisa 樹大招風	2016	Frank Hui,Jevons Au, Vicky Wong	Jordan Chan, Gordon Lam, Richie Jen	Unpassing of review	The film's scenes were considered to be secretly filmed because the script was not approved and no permit was obtained for filming in mainland China. Critics speculate that the reason for this may be the sensitive topics of corruption and arms dealing in mainland China.	Deleted
Suicide Squad	2016	David Ayer	Will Smith, Jared Leto, Margot Robbie	Unpassing of review	Warner Brothers had changed the title of the film to "Special Task Force X" to take into account China's situation, but it was soon announced that the film had not been approved. A source familiar with CFGC said "they (SAPPRFT) did not consider the film suitable for distribution in China". The media suggested that the reason behind this may be the regulations of the SAPPRFT, which prohibit the promotion of negative and demoralizing values.	3569910
A Taxi Driver	2017	Jang Hoon	Song Kang-ho, Thomas Kretschmann, Yoo Hae-jin, Ryu Jun-yeol	Official ban	The 2017 Korean film tells the story of a German journalist who accidentally takes a taxi driver in Seoul and experiences the Gwangju democracy movement together. The movie has generated a lot of discussion on Douban, as well as associations with the 1989 Tiananmen Square protests and massacre due to the characters in the drama. The Beijing's Internet Information Office ordered the deletion of all websites, wikis, and reviews of the film, resulting in the blocking of the entire network.	Deleted
The Conformist 冰之下	2017	Cai Shangjun	Huang Bo, Song Jia, Liu Hua	Unpassing of review	The film is about gold prospectors on the China–Russia border, and it was shown at the Shanghai Film Festival. The film was shot by the producer on January 5, 2016, and submitted for review in 2017. It has still not been reviewed on September 16, 2019. The reason for this is unknown.	26628284

=== After 2018 ===
After 2018, the Central Committee of the Chinese Communist Party (CCP) issued the Plan for Deepening the Reform of Party and State Institutions. To reflect the basic characteristics of socialism with Chinese characteristics, the film work of the SAPPRFT was handed over to the Central Propaganda Department for unified management, and the China Film Administration (CFA) was formally established.

Title	Year	Director	Actor	Status	Banned Description	Douban Page
Missing Johnny 強尼·凱克	2018	Huang Xi	Lawrence Ko, Rima Zeidan, Sean Huang	Prohibition of screening	Because Lawrence Ko was accused of being a pro-Taiwan independence artist, the crew had confirmed to the distributor that the film was prohibited to screen, and the Taiwan Affairs Office also confirmed the news at a press conference.	26930782
Detention 返校	2019	John Hsu (filmmaker)	Gingle Wang and others	Prohibition of publicity	The film touches on white terror politics.	None
Do Not Split 不割席	2019	Anders Sømme Hammer	Demonstrators and some scholars in the Hong Kong protest	Prohibition of publicity	The reason for the ban was related to the protests in Hong Kong, and because the documentary was selected for the Academy Awards, the Propaganda Department of the CCP ordered major media to keep a low profile and cancel the live broadcast. The CCTV suspended the live broadcast of the Oscars.	None
Nomadland	2020	Chloé Zhao	Frances McDormand, David Strathairn and others	Passing of review Prohibition on screening	The film was originally planned to be released in China in April 2021. Later, because director Zhao Ting was involved in the scandal of insulting China, Nomad Life was collectively boycotted by the Chinese people, so it was withdrawn before the release.	30458949
Revolution of Our Times 時代革命	2021	Kiwi Chow	Seven different groups of demonstrators participating in the Hong Kong protest	Unlicensed	The documentary concerned the Hong Kong Independence position, which was regarded by Beijing as a slogan for Hong Kong independence because of four words in the title revolution of our times. Kiwi Chow already known himself violated the law, so he did not submit it to the OFNAA for review, nor did any major media in China report it.	None
Turning Red	2022	Domee Shi	Rosalie Chiang, Sandra Oh, and others	Prohibition of publicity	Refused classification for negative portrayal of Chinese people and culture, and its indecent content as China only allows age-appropriate films to be released.	None
Her Heart Beats In Its Cage 监狱来的妈妈	2026	Qin Xiaoyu	Zhao Xiaohong	Stopped release by authorities after release date announced	The film is based on real event, which scheduled to release on 30 May 2026. It has been criticized for allegedly "whitewashing" a convicted killer. On 21 May, Shanghai Film Administration announed that the film should stop release due to application issues.	35517408

== Unbanned films ==
Title	Time	Director	Starring	Unbanned Introduction
The Life of Wu Xun 武训传	Released in 1950; Banned in 1951; Unblocked in 2005	Sun Yu	Zhao Dan	On May 20, 1951, the People's Daily published an editorial entitled "The Discussion of the Film 'The Life of Wu Xun' Should Be Taken Seriously", which criticized the film for promoting bourgeois reformism. Director Sun Yu and actor Zhao Dan both wrote self-critical articles about the film, and dozens of other people also made self-criticisms. In mid-November 2005, at the "Film Retrospective" held at Shanghai Film Art Center in commemoration of the 90th anniversary of Zhao Dan's birth, "The Life of Wu Xun" was publicly screened as an "internal screening", which was considered by the media to be the first appearance of the film since it was banned for many years. On March 15, 2012, the film was released for the first time by Guangdong Da Sheng Culture Communication Co., Ltd. for public sale, but the cover of the box set was deliberately labeled "for research" to avoid the residual political risks.
In a Twinkling 瞬间	Produced in 1979; Released in 1980	Zhao Xinshui	Liang Boluo, Huang Mei-Ying, etc.	The film was produced by Changchun Film Studio in 1979. The script was written by Peng Ning, He Kongzhou and Song Ge. The Ministry of Culture shelved the public screening of the film because the Air Force thought that it vilified the image of the army and might affect the recruitment of the Air Force. In November 1980, to coincide with the public trial of Lin Biao and Jiang Qing, the Ministry of Culture screened "In a Twinkling", but the film was quickly downgraded because the audience was too small.
Boat People 投奔怒海	Banned in 1980s DVD release in 2008	Ann Hui	George Lam, Andy Lau, etc.	The film was banned in mainland China due to violence against Vietnamese refugees and its anti-Communist sentiments. It was also banned in Taiwan because it was filmed on Hainan, an island in the People's Republic of China. In 2008, a Hong Kong version of the DVD was introduced in China.
The Emperor's Shadow 秦颂	Short release in 1996; Unblocked after more than a year	Zhou Xiaowen	Jiang Wen, Ge You, Xu Qing	In July 1996, the CMPC decided to release "The Emperor's Shadow" in five cities, including Beijing, Shanghai, Tianjin, Guangzhou and Chengdu, and on the fourth day of its release, the relevant people ordered the film to be disposed of. On the next day, the relevant documents were sent to all the authorities, and all distribution, screening and promotion activities were stopped. The Emperor's Shadow then disappeared from Chinese cinemas and media. A year or so later, the film was released from the ban and was broadcast on China Central Television, and is available on the Internet as a legitimate source.。
Mr. Zhao 赵先生	Released in 1998; DVD release in 2006	Lü Yue	Jiang Wenli, Shi Jingming, Chen Yinan, Zhang Zhihua	The film was not released in China. The original DVD was published by Guangzhou Audio and Video Publishing House in 2006.
Beijing Bicycle 十七岁的单车	Produced in 2000; Approved in 2004; Premiere in 2013	Wang Xiaoshuai	Cui Lin, Li Bin, Gao Yuanyuan, Zhou Xun	To participate in the Berlinale, the film went abroad for the competition before receiving the approval, and was banned from theatrical release in China for violating the relevant regulations. The film was renamed "Bicycle" in 2004 and passed the audit, but it was never screened because many people had already seen it on pirated discs, etc. In 2013, as a follow-up to a commemorative event, the film had a special screening at a film center in Beijing.
Devils on the Doorstep 鬼子来了	2000 Overseas participation 2002 Overseas Screening	Jiang Wen	Jiang Wen,Kagawa Teruyuki, Yuan Ding,Jiang Hongbo	The film was not approved to participate in the Cannes Film Festival, in violation of the relevant regulations. The SAPPRFT found that the film "violated history" and "exaggerated the ignorance, insensitivity and servility of the Chinese people", and that "there was a serious deviation from the basic intent". It was first screened in Japan on April 27, 2002. The film can be viewed on China Central Television's CCTV website and other video sites.
The Da Vinci Code	Short release in 2006; DVD release in 2006	Ron Howard	Tom Hanks, Audrey Tautou, Jean Reno	The film was taken down by the Chinese authorities 20 days after its release, and a spokesman for Shanghai United Cinemas received a notice to stop showing the film, which the BBC reported was boycotted by the Chinese Patriotic Catholic Association. The film is now being sold on DVD.

== See also ==
- Film censorship in China
