= Memoirs of a Geisha (film) =

2005 film by Rob Marshall

- Theatrical release poster
- Directed by: Rob Marshall
- Screenplay by: Robin Swicord
- Based on: Memoirs of a Geisha by Arthur Golden
- Produced by: Lucy Fisher; Steven Spielberg; Douglas Wick
- Starring: Zhang Ziyi; Ken Watanabe; Michelle Yeoh; Kōji Yakusho; Youki Kudoh; Kaori Momoi; Gong Li
- Cinematography: Dion Beebe
- Edited by: Pietro Scalia
- Music by: John Williams
- Production companies: Columbia Pictures; DreamWorks Pictures; Spyglass Entertainment; Amblin Entertainment; Red Wagon Entertainment
- Distributed by: Sony Pictures Releasing
- Release date: December 23, 2005
- Running time: 145 minutes
- Country: United States
- Language: English
- Budget: $85 million
- Box office: $162.2 million

Memoirs of a Geisha is a 2005 American epic period drama film directed by Rob Marshall and adapted by Robin Swicord from the 1997 novel of the same name by Arthur Golden. It tells the story of a young Japanese girl, Chiyo Sakamoto, who is sold by her impoverished family to a geisha house (okiya) to support them by training as and eventually becoming a geisha under the pseudonym "Sayuri Nitta". The film centers around the sacrifices and hardship faced by pre-World War II geisha, and the challenges posed to geisha society by the war and a modernizing world. It stars Zhang Ziyi in the lead role, with Michelle Yeoh, Gong Li, Youki Kudoh, Suzuka Ohgo, Samantha Futerman and Ken Watanabe.

The film was produced by Steven Spielberg (through production companies Amblin Entertainment and DreamWorks Pictures) and Douglas Wick (through Red Wagon Entertainment). Production was split between southern and northern California and a number of locations in Kyoto, including the Kiyomizu temple and the Fushimi Inari shrine. The film was released by Sony Pictures Releasing in the United States on December 23, 2005.

The film was moderately successful at the box office and garnered polarized reviews from critics worldwide. The acting, visuals, sets, costumes, and musical score (composed by Spielberg's long-time collaborator John Williams) were praised, but the film was criticized for casting some non-Japanese actresses as Japanese women and for its style over substance approach. It was also nominated for and won numerous awards, including nominations for six Academy Awards, and eventually won three: Best Cinematography, Best Art Direction and Best Costume Design. Zhang was also nominated for the Golden Globe Award, Screen Actors Guild Award, and the BAFTA Award for Best Actress.

== Plot ==
In 1929, Chiyo Sakamoto and her older sister Satsu are sold by their poor father and taken to Gion, Kyoto. Chiyo is taken in by Kayoko Nitta, or "Mother", a local okiya owner; while Satsu, deemed unattractive, is sent to a brothel instead. Chiyo also meets "Granny" and "Auntie" (who is kind to Chiyo), the other women who run the house; Pumpkin, another young girl; and the okiya's resident geisha Hatsumomo.

Pumpkin and Chiyo soon begin geisha training. Hatsumomo, threatened by Chiyo, is immediately abusive. One night, Hatsumomo and another geisha (Korin) force her to ruin a valuable kimono belonging to their rival Mameha, a prominent geisha in Gion. Auntie takes up the responsibility of punishing Chiyo, as ruining Mameha's kimono has cost Mother money. Hoping she will run away, Hatsumomo tells her where to find Satsu in the red light district. They plan to escape the following night.

When Chiyo returns to the Okiya late that night, she stumbles upon Hatsumomo and her illicit boyfriend Koichi. As the noise wakes the rest of the okiya, Koichi runs away and Hatsumomo tries to frame Chiyo for stealing to distract from her tryst. Mother begins to severely beat Chiyo, who quickly informs her of Hatsumomo's relations with Koichi. Finding evidence of the affair, Mother bars her from seeing him, and locks the gate; only letting them out for appointments.

The next night, trying to escape via the rooftops, Chiyo falls and is injured. Due to her accumulating costs, Mother stops investing in her geisha training, making Chiyo a servant to pay off her debts. Satsu flees Kyoto and Chiyo never sees her again. Mother later tells Chiyo her parents died. One day, while crying on a bridge, Chiyo encounters Chairman Ken Iwamura. He buys her a treat, gives her his handkerchief and some money to cheer her up. Touched by his kindness, Chiyo resolves to become a geisha to one day be part of his life.

Years later, Pumpkin debuts as a maiko under Hatsumomo's tutelage. Shortly afterwards, Chiyo is taken under the wing of Mameha, who persuades Mother to reinvest in Chiyo's geisha training, promising to pay her double after her debut. Chiyo becomes a maiko and is renamed Sayuri. At a sumo match, she is reintroduced to the chairman, but is noticed by his gruff business partner Toshikazu Nobu.

Due to Mameha's efforts, and no thanks to Hatsumomo, Sayuri rises in popularity, attracting the attention of many men—including Dr. Crab and the Baron, Mameha's own danna. In a bidding war for Sayuri's deflowering ceremony, as part of her becoming a full geisha, Dr. Crab gives the record-breaking bid of 15,000 yen. Mother immediately names Sayuri as her adopted daughter and the heiress to the okiya, crushing Pumpkin and enraging Hatsumomo.

Returning home afterwards, Sayuri finds a drunken Hatsumomo in her room, with the chairman's handkerchief. A fight breaks out, in which Hatsumomo lights the okiya on fire. The building is saved, and Hatsumomo is banished. Sayuri's successful career is cut short by World War II. Sayuri is relocated to the countryside, where she works making kimonos. After the war ends, Nobu asks her to help him impress an American Colonel to get funding for their business. She convinces Mameha to help her, as well as Pumpkin, who is now an escort.

Sayuri travels with Nobu, the chairman, Mameha, Pumpkin, and the American soldiers to the Amami Islands. The Colonel propositions Sayuri, but she rejects him. Nobu confronts her afterwards, confessing his desire to become her danna. Sayuri plans to have Nobu catch her being intimate with the Colonel so he loses interest, enlisting Pumpkin's help. However, Pumpkin brings the chairman instead. When confronted, she admits it was in revenge for Mother adopting Sayuri instead of her. Disheartened, Sayuri gives up on the chairman.

Returning to Gion, Sayuri is summoned to a nearby tea-house. Expecting Nobu, she is surprised to see the chairman. He confesses his feelings for Sayuri, admitting he always knew who she was but refused to interfere with Nobu's feelings out of respect, and that he himself arranged for Mameha to become her mentor. Sayuri finally can declare her love to the chairman and they kiss.

== Cast ==
- Zhang Ziyi as Chiyo Sakamoto/Sayuri Nitta
  - Suzuka Ohgo as young Chiyo
  - Shizuko Hoshi as older Chiyo (voice-over narrator)
- Gong Li as Hatsumomo
- Michelle Yeoh as Mameha
- Youki Kudoh as Pumpkin
  - Zoe Weizenbaum as young Pumpkin
- Ken Watanabe as Chairman Ken Iwamura
- Kōji Yakusho as Nobu
- Kaori Momoi as Kayoko "Mother" Nitta
- Tsai Chin as Auntie
- Cary-Hiroyuki Tagawa as the Baron
- Samantha Futerman as Satsu Sakamoto
- Mako as Mr. Sakamoto
- Elizabeth Sung as Mrs. Sakamoto
- Kotoko Kawamura as Grandmother Nitta
- Kenneth Tsang as the General
- Eugenia Yuan as Korin
- Karl Yune as Koichi
- Ted Levine as Col. Derricks
- Paul Adelstein as Lt. Hutchins
- Togo Igawa as Tanaka
- Randall Duk Kim as Dr. Crab
- Navia Nguyen as Izuko
- Faith Shin as Keiko
- Yoko Narahashi as Mameha's Maid
- Takayo Fischer as Teahouse Mistress
- Nobu Matsuhisa as Kimono Artist

== Production ==
=== Pre-production ===
Shortly after the release of Arthur Golden's Memoirs of a Geisha in 1997, the film rights to the novel were purchased for $1 million by Red Wagon's Douglas Wick and Lucy Fisher, backed by Columbia Pictures. The studio first intended to shoot the movie in Japan in the Japanese language, with subtitles. In April 1998, Steven Spielberg announced that he would direct Memoirs of a Geisha, as his follow-up to Saving Private Ryan, bringing in his company DreamWorks. In September 1998, dancer Rika Okamoto was cast in the lead role of Sayuri, in what would have been her first film role. Tony-nominated Broadway actress Julyana Soelistyo was cast opposite her, as Pumpkin. Later that month, Spielberg hired Ron Bass to write the film's screenplay. Filming was set to begin in the first quarter of 1999, in Japan, now in the English language.

By early 1999, Spielberg was reported to be working with Oscar-winning costume designer James Acheson, with filming pushed to 2000. Spielberg's DreamWorks partner David Geffen attempted to persuade him not to direct the film, since it was for another studio, saying "I tried to talk him out of it, I don't think it's good enough for him." In January 2001, Akiva Goldsman was reported to be writing a new draft of the script. By 2002, with Spielberg having postponed production on Geisha three times - for A.I. Artificial Intelligence, Minority Report and Catch Me If You Can - he stepped down from directorial duties, remaining attached to produce.

Wick and Fisher approached Rob Marshall, who was interested in doing a non-musical after Annie and Chicago. This brought a third company into Memoirs of a Geisha, as Marshall was signed to make his next film with Chicago distributors Miramax Films.

The three leading non-Japanese actresses, including Ziyi Zhang, Gong Li, and Michelle Yeoh, were put through "geisha boot camp" before production commenced, during which they were trained in traditional geisha practices of Japanese music, dance, and tea ceremony. Anthropologist Liza Dalby was also brought in to aid in the production as an advisor, though she later commented that "while the director and producers often asked my opinion on things, most of the time they went ahead and followed their own vision", calling the film a "wasted opportunity" to display geisha society accurately.

=== Production ===
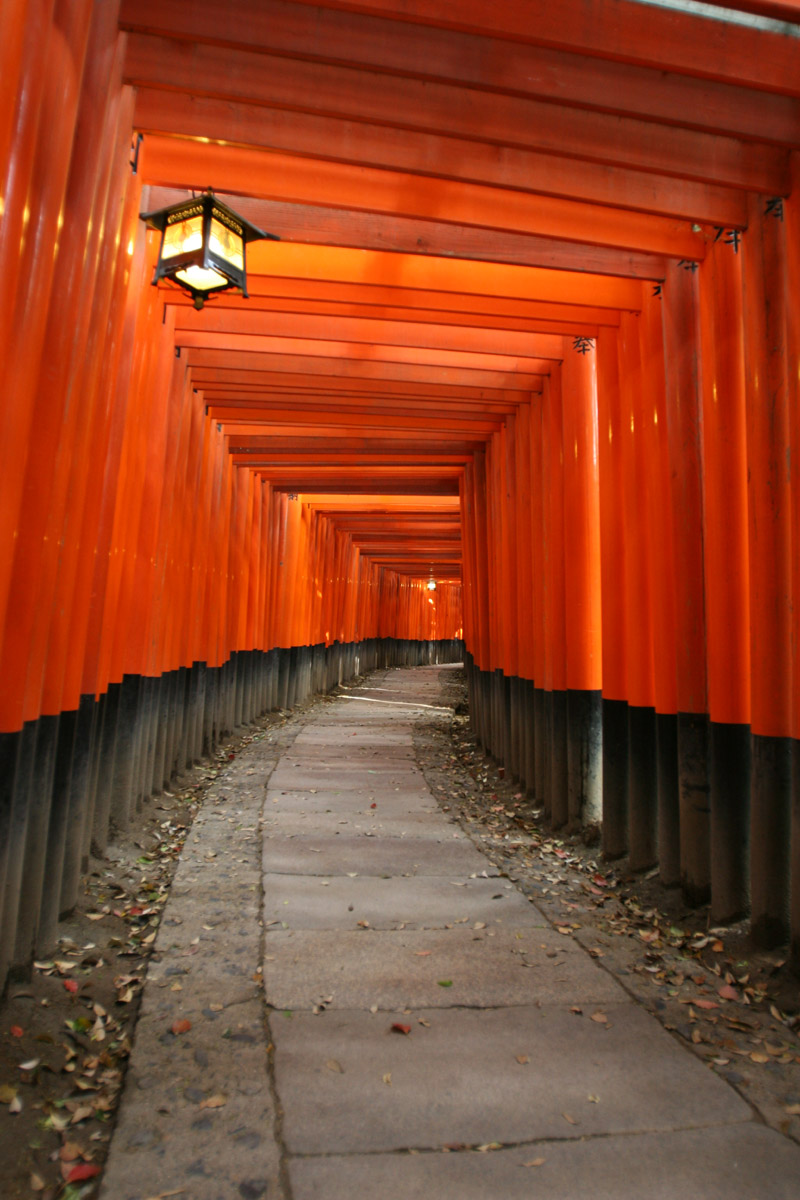
The orange gateways at the Fushimi Inari shrine in Fushimi-ku, Kyoto, used in the scene where a young Chiyo runs through them

Production of the film took place from September 29, 2004, to January 31, 2005. It was decided that contemporary Japan looked too modern for a story set in pre- and post-war Japan, meaning that many scenes were filmed on cost-effective soundstages or on location in the United States, primarily California. The majority of the film was shot on a large set built on a ranch in Thousand Oaks, California. John Myhre, the production designer, travelled to Japan for a month long trip and took "about 200" photos a day to use as reference for the film. The crew used this to construct around 40 Japanese-style three-story structures, five separate cobblestone streets connected via alleyways, and dug and filled a 250-foot-long river. Most interior scenes were filmed in Culver City, California at the Sony Pictures Studios lot. Other locations in California included San Francisco, Moss Beach, Descanso Gardens in La Cañada Flintridge, Sacramento, Yamashiro's Restaurant in Hollywood, the Japanese Gardens at the Huntington Library and Gardens in San Marino, Hakone Gardens in Saratoga, and Downtown Los Angeles at the Belasco Theater on Hill Street. Towards the end of production, some scenes were shot in Kyoto, including the Fushimi Inari-Taisha, the head shrine of Inari, located in Fushimi-ku, Kyoto.

=== Post-production ===
One of the tasks faced by sound editors in post-production was improving the English pronunciation of the cast, which in part involved piecing together different dialogue clips from other segments of the film to form missing syllables in the actors' speech, as some spoke only partially phonetic English when performing. The work of the sound editors earned the film an Academy Award nomination for Best Achievement in Sound Editing.

== Music ==
The Memoirs of a Geisha official soundtrack features Yo-Yo Ma performing the cello solos, as well as Itzhak Perlman performing the violin solos. The music was composed and conducted by John Williams, who won his fourth Golden Globe Award for Best Original Score.

== Release ==
The film premiered in Tokyo on November 29, 2005. The film had a limited theatrical release on December 9, 2005, before expanding wide in December 23.

=== Home media ===
The film debuted on DVD, in both Widescreen and Fullscreen versions, on March 28, 2006. The release was a 2-Disc set, with a second disc dedicated to special features. The film was subsequently released on the Blu-ray format on September 25, 2007. The Blu-ray version received positive reviews, for the video and audio quality and for porting over every single extra from the 2-Disc DVD release.

== Reception ==
In the Western hemisphere, the film received mixed reviews. In China and Japan, reviews were more negative, with some controversy among audiences and critics arising from the film's casting and its relationship to Japan's history.

=== Western box office and reviews ===
Memoirs of a Geisha received mixed reviews from Western critics. Illinois' Daily Herald said that the "[s]trong acting, meticulously created sets, beautiful visuals, and a compelling story of a celebrity who can't have the one thing she really wants make Geisha memorable". The Washington Times called the film "a sumptuously faithful and evocative adaption" while adding that "[c]ontrasting dialects may remain a minor nuisance for some spectators, but the movie can presumably count on the pictorial curiosity of readers who enjoyed Mr. Golden's sense of immersion, both harrowing and [a]esthetic, in the culture of a geisha upbringing in the years that culminated in World War II".

On Rotten Tomatoes the film has an approval rating of 35% based on 164 reviews with an average rating of 5.40/10; the consensus stated "Less nuanced than its source material, Memoirs of a Geisha may be a lavish production, but it still carries the simplistic air of a soap opera." On Metacritic, the film has a score of 54 out of 100, based on reviews from 38 critics, meaning "mixed or average review". Audiences surveyed by CinemaScore gave the film a grade "B+" on scale of A to F.

In the United States, the film managed $57 million during its box office run. The film was facing off against King Kong, The Chronicles of Narnia, and Fun with Dick and Jane during the Christmas holiday. On its first week in limited release, the film screening in only eight theaters tallied up an $85,313 per-theater average, which made it second in highest per-theater averages behind Brokeback Mountain for 2005. International gross reached $158 million. Despite being based in Japan, the film would have greater popularity in the United States than it would in Japan.

The New Statesman criticized Memoirs of a Geisha's plot, saying that after Hatsumomo leaves, "the plot loses what little momentum it had and breaks down into one pretty visual after another" and says that the film version "abandons the original's scholarly mien to reveal the soap opera bubbling below". The Journal praised Ziyi Zhang, saying that she "exudes a heartbreaking innocence and vulnerability" but said "too much of the character's yearning and despair is concealed behind the mask of white powder and rouge". London's The Evening Standard compared Memoirs of a Geisha to Cinderella and praised Gong Li, saying that "Li may be playing the loser of the piece but she saves this film" and Gong "endows Hatsumomo with genuine mystery". Eighteen days later, The Evening Standard put Memoirs of a Geisha on its Top Ten Films list. Glasgow's Daily Record praised the film, saying the "geisha world is drawn with such intimate detail that it seems timeless until the war, and with it the modern world comes crashing in".

== Controversies ==
=== Casting ===
Controversy arose due to the casting of the film, with all three main female roles going to non-Japanese actresses. Zhang Ziyi and Gong Li both held Chinese citizenship at the time of the film's production, whereas Michelle Yeoh is an ethnic Chinese from Malaysia. All three were already prominent actresses in Chinese cinema. The film's producers defended the position, stating that the main priorities in casting the three main roles were "acting ability and star power". Director Rob Marshall noted examples such as the Mexican actor Anthony Quinn being cast as a Greek man in Zorba the Greek.

Opinion of the casting in the Asian community was mixed, with some finding the casting of Chinese actresses for Japanese roles offensive in the face of Japan's wartime atrocities in China and other parts of Asia. The Chinese government canceled the film's release because of such connections, and a website denounced Zhang Ziyi as an "embarrassment to China".

In Japan, reception to the film was mixed. Some Japanese expressed offence at the three main female roles being played by Chinese actresses; others took issue with the portrayal of geisha in the film, deeming it inaccurate and Westernized. Japanese cultural expert Peter MacIntosh, who had advised on the film, expressed concern that it had not been made specifically for a Japanese audience, and that anyone knowledgeable about Japanese culture who saw the film would be "appalled". The film garnered only average box office success in Japan, despite being a high-budget film about Japanese culture.

Other Asians defended the casting, including the film's main Japanese star Ken Watanabe, who said that "talent is more important than nationality." In defense of the film, Zhang Ziyi said:

A director is only interested in casting someone he believes is appropriate for a role...regardless of whether someone is Japanese or Chinese or Korean, we all would have had to learn what it is to be a geisha, because almost nobody today knows what that means—not even the Japanese actors on the film. Geisha was not meant to be a documentary. I remember seeing in the Chinese newspaper a piece that said we had only spent six weeks to learn everything and that that was not respectful toward the culture. It's like saying that if you're playing a mugger, you have to rob a certain number of people. To my mind, what this issue is all about, though, is the intense historical problems between China and Japan. The whole subject is a land mine. Maybe one of the reasons people made such a fuss about Geisha was that they were looking for a way to vent their anger.

Film critic Roger Ebert pointed out that the film was made by a Japanese-owned company, and that Gong Li and Zhang Ziyi outgrossed any Japanese actress even in the Japanese box office.

=== Chinese response to the film ===
The film received occasionally hostile responses in Mainland China, with the film being censored and banned by China. Relations between Japan and mainland China at the time of the film's release had been particularly tense, owing to the then-Prime Minister of Japan, Junichiro Koizumi, having paid a number of visits to the controversial Yasukuni Shrine — a shrine specially dedicated to honoring Japan's war dead, including those convicted of war crimes. These visits were denounced by China's foreign ministry as having honored war criminals whose crimes pertained to Japan's actions in China in World War II specifically.

The film's setting of the 1920s to 1940s covers both World War II and the Second Sino-Japanese War, during which time Japan captured and forced thousands of Korean and Chinese women known as "comfort women" into sexual slavery for Japanese military personnel. Various newspapers such as the Shanghai-based Oriental Morning Post and the Shanghai Youth Daily expressed fears that the film could be banned by censors, with concerns that the casting of Chinese actresses as geisha could create anti-Japanese sentiment, and stir up resentment surrounding Japan's wartime actions in China — in particular, the use of Chinese women as sex slaves for Japan's occupying forces.

The film was originally scheduled to be shown within mainland China on February 9, 2006; however, the Chinese State Administration of Radio, Film, and Television (SARFT) decided to ban the film on February 1, 2006, considering the film "too sensitive" for release, a decision that overturned the film's approval for screening in November.

=== Prohibition of screening in China ===
The film was originally scheduled to be approved in November 2005, but in January 2006, the SARFT failed to issue a screening permit. When asked by a reporter whether the film had passed the censorship process, the person in charge said "no comment". After 25 January, Memoirs of a Geisha was banned from screening in theatres in mainland China. Mao Yu, director of the Film Council's publicity department, said the film was "sensitive and complex". The media pointed out Zhang Ziyi's role involving nudity and allusions to prostitution, and also a scene in which she bathes with a Japanese man as reasons for the ban, and that a Chinese actress plays a Japanese geisha.

== Awards and nominations ==
The film received six Academy Award nominations and won three for Best Art Direction, Best Cinematography, and Best Costume Design. Williams won the Golden Globe Award for Best Original Score and Zhang was nominated for Best Actress in Motion Picture – Drama. Gong Li was named Best Supporting Actress by the National Board of Review. Memoirs of a Geisha earned 9 nominations at the Satellite Awards and 6 nominations at the BAFTA Awards.
