= Crazy English (film) =

- Crazy English DVD Cover
- Traditional Chinese: 瘋狂英語
- Simplified Chinese: 疯狂英语
- Hanyu Pinyin: Fēngkúang yīngyǔ
- Directed by: Zhang Yuan
- Produced by: Chen Ziqiu; Zhang Yuan; Zhang Peimin; Willy Cao
- Starring: Li Yang
- Cinematography: Zhang Yuan
- Edited by: Xu Hong
- Music by: Li Xiaolong
- Distributed by: Celluloid Dreams
- Release date: August 8, 1999 (Locarno)
- Running time: 95 minutes
- Country: China
- Languages: Mandarin; English

Crazy English is a 1999 Chinese documentary film directed by Zhang Yuan. The film premiered along with Zhang's Seventeen Years at the 1999 Locarno International Film Festival. It established Zhang's position as a "legitimate" director after years of working independently from, and often at odds with, the Chinese authorities.

In contrast to earlier films, like East Palace, West Palace (1997), Crazy English was produced with the cooperation of the state-owned Xi'an Film Studio, which enjoys a "presented by" billing in the film's credits.

== Plot ==
The film follows one of the People's Republic of China's most popular motivational speakers, Li Yang, the founder of "Crazy English". Li is known for his stadium-sized presentations where he exhorts his audiences to engage in mass recitations of English phrases and idioms, often with a strong nationalist bent: "Conquer English to Make China Stronger!". Li, however, has also courted controversy. Despite the fact that he teaches a foreign language, Li has never left China, a fact not revealed in the film until the end. Other common criticisms, including accusations that Li Yang is a "nationalist huckster" and that his methods do not actually improve English-speaking ability, receive a much more subtle presentation in Zhang's film.

The film follows Li on his tours throughout China with a few interspersed interviews. Zhang Yuan has described the film as a combination of Leni Riefenstahl's Triumph of the Will and Robert Zemeckis' Forrest Gump.

== Production history ==
The seeds for Crazy English first arose when Li Yang's manager asked to meet with Zhang Yuan at a bar in Beijing's Sanlitun neighborhood. At the time Zhang Yuan had not even heard of Li Yang or his "Crazy English" programs. After meeting with the manager, Zhang was sufficiently intrigued by the idea of a documentary about Li to arrange for an actual meeting with the motivational speaker.

Once the two men met, Zhang Yuan "immediately" decided to make the film. Though made with the assent of official authorities, the filmmakers were nevertheless forced to make certain cuts before being allowed a limited release for their documentary. Zhang has noted that his own opinions of Li Yang vary dramatically from admiration to disgust. One critic also noticed Zhang's ambivalence in the film and noted that the film seems to shift from appreciation or amusement at Li Yang's methodologies to one darker in tone, as Li Yang's mass rallies begin to resemble Mao-era Red Guard rallies or even Hitler's Nuremberg Rally.

== Reception ==
Despite its official approval, Crazy English received only a limited release in select cities within China. Zhang Yuan has stated that the film's reception within China was difficult to read, given the mass adoration (and criticism) that Li Yang often elicits.

While China remained ambivalent, the west also responded to Crazy English with mixed reactions. At least one critic felt that the film was too long and better suited for television than film. On the other hand, the film journal Senses of Cinema showered praise on Crazy English, saying, "This is a fascinating film – for China watchers, for educators and for fans of the documentary film – and is an absolute must for festival patrons."

As for the film's subject, Li Yang was reportedly less than pleased by the film's portrayal of him as a demagogue, and he has gone on to say that the film was "not a real documentary" accusing Zhang of manipulating the film to appeal to Western audiences.
