= Wang Xiaobo =

Chinese novelist and essayist (1952–1997)

王小波 Wang Xiaobo
- Born: May 13, 1952; Beijing, China
- Died: April 11, 1997 (aged 44); Beijing, China
- Education: Renmin University (BS); University of Pittsburgh (MA)
- Spouse: Li Yinhe (m. 1980)

Wang Xiaobo (Chinese: 王小波; pinyin: Wáng Xiǎobō) (May 13, 1952 – April 11, 1997) was a Chinese writer known for his sharp irony and critical spirit, through which he portrayed the absurdity and suffering of everyday life. Born in Beijing to an intellectual family, Wang was sent to rural areas in Yunnan in 1968 during the Cultural Revolution. He returned to Beijing in 1972 and worked as a factory worker before enrolling at Renmin University of China in 1978. In 1984 he went to the United States to study at the University of Pittsburgh under historian Cho-yun Hsu, and after returning to China in 1988 he briefly taught at Peking University and Renmin University before becoming a freelance writer in 1992. Wang rose to prominence with his novel The Golden Age, which later became part of his “Age” trilogy together with The Silver Age and The Bronze Age. In the 1990s, he gained particular popularity among Chinese college students and achieved posthumous status as a cultural icon associated with liberal and independent thought in China.

== Life ==
On May 13, 1952, Wang was born in a family of intellectuals in Beijing. From 1968 to 1970, he was transferred to a collective farm in Yunnan as an "educated youth". In 1971, he jumped to the team in Muping District, Yantai, province of Shandong, and later became a private teacher. In 1972, he worked in Beijing Niujie Teaching Instrument Factory, and in 1974 he worked in Beijing Xicheng District Semiconductor Factory. This period of working life is the writing background for novels of his such as Love in Revolutionary Period.

In 1977, he met and fell in love with Li Yinhe, who was the editor of the Guangming Daily. In 1980, they married and he published his debut work, Earth Forever. In 1978, he entered the Department of Trade and Economics of Renmin University of China with a bachelor's degree, studying trade economics and commodity science. In 1982, he worked as a teacher at Renmin and began to write The Golden Age. In 1968, he began to try to write in Yunnan Corps. This is the writing background of The Golden Age and the inspiration for The Endlessness. In 1984, he studied at the Center for East Asian Studies at the University of Pittsburgh and received a master's degree. He began to write novels based on the legend of the Tang dynasty, during which he received the guidance of historian Xu Zhuoyun. While studying in the United States, Wang traveled throughout the country and used his 1986 summer vacation to visit Western Europe.

Wang returned to China in 1988, and served as a lecturer in the Department of Sociology of Peking University. In 1991, he served as a lecturer in the accounting department of Renmin. He became a freelance writer in 1992. His only screenplay, East Palace West Palace, won the Best Screenplay Award at the Mar del Plata International Film Festival in Argentina and was nominated for the 1997 Cannes International Film Festival.

Wang died in Beijing on April 11, 1997, after a heart attack.

== Writing style ==
Wang Xiaobo was best known for vernacular narration. He also published essays, which served as the primary entry point to his work. His experience of living and studying in the East and the West has made him a writer full of free humanistic spirit and independent intellectual character. In a letter to his teacher Xu Zhuoyun, Wang also stated that he tried not to be nudity but fascinating to write sexual content into his novels.

Wang's unique black humor runs throughout his works, which also show his attitude towards life. His novels were drawn from his life experiences, including his time as an "educated youth" in Yunnan and as an engineer engaged in technical work. The age and background of the works are also related to Wang's life. Growth periods overlap. In these works, he portrays a reality: "I see a world without intelligence, but wisdom exists in chaos; I see a world without sex, but sex exists in chaos; I see a boring world, but interesting exists in the chaos".

Judging from his essays, the philosopher Bertrand Russell had a deep influence on Wang's thoughts. He admired and advocated science and rationality, and believed that people's lives should pursue the unknown. He opposed the imprisonment of thoughts and advocated that people's thinking should be diverse, to make life interesting, and that they should love wisdom. His work was particularly influential with college students in the 1990s, but his influence is still felt.

== Wang Xiaobo phenomenon ==
Wang Xiaobo won the United Daily News novella award two times before his death and was widely praised in overseas Chinese literature circles. However, when he hoped to enter the mainland literary system, he was met with unprecedented coldness, and he found it difficult to publish his works. Wang confessed in the postscript of his collection of novels Golden Age: "This book was published thanks to an indomitable will and a positive attitude towards life. It must be said that these excellent qualities are not owned by the author. In view of the fact that publishing this book is better than writing this. This book is much more difficult, so if there is something about this book, it belongs to all the friends who helped publish it."

Wang's sudden death in 1997 marked the beginning of the Wang Xiaobo phenomenon. His works have been disseminated and accepted unprecedentedly, and have prompted serious reactions in both folk and intellectual circles. In the 21st century, he is among the most-read of 1990s Chinese novelists. Various forms of Wang Xiaobo commemorative meetings and work seminars continue.

The explosion of the Wang Xiaobo phenomenon lies in his essays. It is worth mentioning that his essays have received attention before him. Critics have compared Wang Xiaobo's sudden rise in popularity to that of Chen Yinke, signifying the second boom of the liberal wave in China.

Though Wang Xiabo continues to be very popular, mainstream critical reaction to his novels has been limited and the focus of interest is his essays.

Before his death, Wang once said, "One day we will all die, and there will be people walking on the path of pursuing wisdom. I can't see what happens after death. But when I was alive, I thought about it, and I thought about it in my heart. I'm very happy."

The famous contemporary Chinese writer Wang Meng commented: "Wang Xiaobo is a very thoughtful person. I am interested in his philosophical prose and essays. But for his novels, to be honest, I didn't finish reading them because his style is not great to my appetite."

Huang Ping, a professor of the Chinese Department of East China Normal University and a young critic, said: "(Wang Xiaobo) joking about aesthetics, a masterpiece of a generation". Chinese American musician Gao Xiaosong regards him as a "god-like existence"; writer Feng Tang has said called Wang "a miracle" and "a very good start."

Wang has been identified as an inspiration for and early representative of minjian, grassroot intellectuals, a population of alternative intellectuals who were able to grow around the 2000s in China.

== List of works ==
Wang Xiaobo wrote several novels, short story collections and essays, some of which have been translated into English, French and Italian.

=== Novels ===
- 《红拂夜奔》 Running Away At Night
- 《万寿寺》 Wan Show Temple
- 《黄金时代》 Golden Age : a novel, translated by Yan Yan, New York : Astra House, 2022, ISBN 978-1-6626-0121-7
- 《白银时代》 The Silver Age
- 《青铜时代》 The Bronze Age
- 《黑铁时代》 The Iron Age
- 《夜里两点钟》 Half Past Two At Night
- 《茫茫黑夜漫游》 The Vast Tour
- 《樱桃红》 Red Like Cherries
- 《寻找无双》 Looking for Wushuang or In Search of Wushuang
- 《三十而立》
- 《似水流年》
- 《革命时期的爱情》 Love in the Time of Revolution
- 《我的阴阳两界》

=== Plays ===
- 《东宫·西宫》

=== Short story collections and Essays ===
- 《沉默的大多数》 The Silent Majority
- 《思维的乐趣》 The Pleasure of Thought
- 《我的精神家园》 My Spiritual Homeland
- 《理想国与哲人王》 Utopia and the Philosopher King
- 《爱你就像爱生命》 Loving You Is Like Loving Life
- 《一只特立独行的猪》 A Maverick Pig
- 《他们的世界: 中国男同性恋群落透视》Their World: A Look at the Chinese Male Homosexuality Community (Coauthored with Li Yinhe)

== Filmography ==
- 1997: East Palace, West Palace directed by Zhang Yuan, adapted from Wang's short story 《似水柔情》 (English: Sentiments Like Water).

== Attitude ==
In response to the idea that Wang's work lacked positive themes and inspiring messages, Wang wrote: "Though the author is a modest person, he cannot accept those opinions. Being positive is one of our norms, but it should not be always mentioned. I think my duty is writing interesting novels as possible as I can, and should not add some deliberate sermon. My writing attitude is to write some works for those people who read novels, not to teach undereducated youth..."
