= The Square (1994 film) =

- Film poster
- Traditional Chinese: 廣場
- Simplified Chinese: 广场
- Hanyu Pinyin: Guǎng chǎng
- Directed by: Zhang Yuan; Duan Jinchuan
- Produced by: Zhang Yuan; Zhang Yi
- Cinematography: Zhang Yuan
- Edited by: Yang Hongyu
- Production companies: Zhang Yuan Studio; Dragon Films
- Release date: 1994
- Running time: 100 minutes
- Country: China
- Language: Mandarin

The Square is a 1994 Chinese documentary film directed by Duan Jinchuan and Zhang Yuan. It is Zhang's first true documentary film, after two documentary-influenced fiction films: Mama and Beijing Bastards.

Filmed in black and white, The Square documents a day in the life of Tiananmen Square a few years after the events of 1989.

== Subject ==
The film documents a day in the life of Tiananmen Square in 1994, a mere five years after the crushing of a student-led democracy movement in 1989. The events captured are considered "mundane" but illustrate the level of control exerted over the Square by the authoritarian government. While children play with kites and old men toss frisbees, police and soldiers are also ever-present.

Near the end of the film, PLA soldiers array cannons in preparation for a salute to a visiting head of state. As the guns are fired, Zhang focuses his camera on the reactions of the ordinary citizens. For one critic, the film "seem to suggest the ceaseless and draining effort the government must expend to maintain its awesome facade of monolithic power over its citizens."

== Production history ==
The concept of a documentary film about Tiananmen Square shortly after the Tiananmen Square protests of 1989 began while Zhang Yuan was still a student at the Beijing Film Academy, and while he was producing and filming his debut, Mama, in the late 1980s. After the protests were crushed, Zhang had opportunities to ride his bicycle around the Square from his apartment in the nearby Xidan neighborhood, noting both the quietness in the years following 1989 and the surplus of both uniformed and plainclothes policemen.

In an interview given several years later, Zhang noted that he saw Tiananmen Square as "one giant stage" which pushed him to "pick up my camera and record some of those more interesting people and attempt to capture the feeling of the square." When he finally followed through on his plan, police would often come up and question his purpose, to which he would reply that he was part of a CCTV film crew.

Zhang filmed the most "mundane" things for a period of twenty-four hours, in the process capturing both ceremony (the flag raising and lowering carried out every day by PLA soldiers) and every-day moments. Indeed, the film is devoid of any dialogue, music, or narration outside of incidental moments captured by the "CCTV" camera.

The film itself was made in defiance of government disapproval, as Zhang had recently been blacklisted by the government for his submission of films to international film festivals without permission. Despite this impediment, Zhang's documentary would be screened at the Hawaii International Film Festival, where it would win a Jury Prize.
