= Jacopo Quadri =

Italian film editor (born 1964)

- Born: 17 November 1964 (age 61); Milan, Italy
- Occupation: Film editor
- Years active: 1992-present

Jacopo Quadri (born 17 November 1964) is an Italian film editor and documentarist, whose career spanned over 30 years.

== Life and career ==
Born in Milan, Quadri is the son of theatre critic Franco Quadri and journalist Marisa Rusconi. He graduated from the Centro Sperimentale di Cinematografia in Rome, and served as film editor of all Mario Martone's films.

In 1998, Quadri won a David di Donatello for best editing for Martone's Rehearsals for War In 1999, he won a Ciak d'Oro for Bernardo Bertolucci's Besieged. In 2000, he won a second Ciak d'Oro for Marco Bechis' Olympic Garage. He won again the Ciak d'Oro in 2004 for The Scent of Blood and The Dreamers, in 2011 for We Believed, and in 2016 for Fire at Sea.

In 2014, Quadri made his directorial debut with a documentary film about Luca Ronconi, La scuola d'estate, that premiered at the Torino Film Festival.

== Selected filmography ==
- Death of a Neapolitan Mathematician (1992)
- Nasty Love (1995)
- The Meter Reader (1995)
- The Uncle from Brooklyn (1995)
- Escoriandoli (1996)
- The Vesuvians (1997)
- Ovosodo (1997)
- Fireworks (1997)
- Besieged (1998)
- Rehearsals for War (1998)
- Kisses and Hugs (1999)
- Seventeen Years (1999)
- Olympic Garage (1999)
- Brainstorm (2000)
- Free the Fish (2000)
- Tomorrow (2001)
- My Name Is Tanino (2002)
- The Dreamers (2003)
- Whisky Romeo Zulu (2004)
- Tropical Malady (2004)
- The Scent of Blood (2004)
- Amatemi (2005)
- Little Red Flowers (2006)
- Agua (2006)
- Flying Lessons (2007)
- Birdwatchers (2008)
- Below Sea Level (2008)
- Dada's Dance (2008)
- We Believed (2010)
- Gangor (2010)
- El Sicario, Room 164 (2010)
- Me and You (2010)
- Steel (2012)
- Sacro GRA (2013)
- Leopardi (2014)
- Sworn Virgin (2015)
- Fire at Sea (2016)
- Pericle (2016)
- The Leisure Seeker (2017)
- Capri-Revolution (2018)
- Magical Nights (2018)
- The Mayor of Rione Sanità (2019)
- Waiting for the Barbarians (2019)
- Notturno (2020)
- The Life Ahead (2020)
- The King of Laughter (2021)
- Nostalgia (2022)
- Dry (2022)
- Felicità (2023)
- Massimo Troisi: Somebody Down There Likes Me (2023)
- The Great Ambition (2024)
- Another Summer Holiday (2024)
- Fuori (2025)
- Five Seconds (2025)
- Trick (2026)
