= Wo Hu =

2006 Hong Kong film by Marco Mak and Wang Guangli

- Film poster
- Traditional Chinese: 臥虎
- Simplified Chinese: 卧虎
- Literal meaning: Crouching Tiger; Undercover Tiger
- Hanyu Pinyin: Wò Hǔ
- Jyutping: Ngo6 Fu2
- Directed by: Marco Mak; Wang Guangli
- Written by: Wong Jing; Gary Tang
- Produced by: Wong Jing; Ivy Kong; Ko Fung-chun
- Starring: Eric Tsang; Francis Ng; Jordan Chan; Sonija Kwok; Michael Miu; Julian Cheung; Patrick Tang; Nie Yuan; Kenny Wong; Shawn Yue; Elliot Ngok; Qin Hailu; Na Wei; Luo Xiangjin; Zuki Lee; Johnny Lu
- Cinematography: Lai Yiu-fai
- Edited by: Angie Lam; Azrael Chung
- Music by: Marco Wan
- Production companies: Mega Vision Pictures; Shanghai Huayu Films; Beijing Forbidden City Film and TV
- Distributed by: Mega Vision Pictures; China Film Group; Tianjin Film Studio
- Release date: 26 October 2006
- Running time: 102 minutes
- Country: Hong Kong
- Language: Cantonese
- Box office: US$576,058

Wo Hu is a 2006 Hong Kong crime film directed by Marco Mak and Wang Guangli. The film stars Eric Tsang, Francis Ng, Jordan Chan, Sonija Kwok, Michael Miu, Julian Cheung and with a special appearance by Shawn Yue.

== Plot ==
Superintendent Wai (Michael Miu) organises an operation, code named WO HU, where he sends an army of undercover cops to spy on triad leader Jim (Eric Tsang). Jim discovers one of the undercover cops, Eric (Timmy Hung), and sends low level triad member, Killer (Shawn Yue), to assassinate him. Killer carries the hit but failed to flee Hong Kong afterwards. Then, Jim orders other triad leaders, Walter (Francis Ng) and Tommy (Julian Cheung), to keep it low in order to avoid the cops' attention. Tommy believes that his triad brothers are plotting to take his assets. After Tommy was exposed by an undercover cop in his crew, he must flee Hong Kong and leave his businesses to Jim. Tommy, however, does not trust Jim and plots against him.

== Cast ==
- Eric Tsang as Jim
- Francis Ng as Walter
- Jordan Chan as Fei
- Sonija Kwok as Elaine
- Michael Miu as Superintendent Wai
- Julian Cheung as Tommy
- Patrick Tang as Ball
- Nie Yuan as Superintendent Mok
- Kenny Wong as Big Mouth
- Shawn Yue as Killer
- Elliot Ngok as Boss Tong Chun
- Qin Hailu as Sophie
- Na Wei as Martin
- Luo Xiangjin as Tacy
- Zuki Lee as Massage girl
- Johnny Lu as Chief Inspector Ming
- Alex Lam as Kin
- Ray Pang as Bean
- Jonathan Lee as Dee
- Joe Cheung as Chief Superintendent Kong
- Timmy Hung as Eric
- Chan Hung as Chuen
- Man Yeung as Monkey
- Wong Siu-yin as Tommy's mother
- Michael Mak as Chiu
- Au Hin-wai as Mr. Ho
- Siu Hung as Walter's hired gangster
- Lee Kin-hung as Uncle Mau
- Tenny Tsang as Prison guard
- Kwok Yuk-keung as Policeman

== Box office ==
The film grossed US$576,058 at the Hong Kong box office from its theatrical run from 26 October to 16 November 2006 in Hong Kong.
