= Dada's Dance =

- Film poster
- Directed by: Zhang Yuan
- Written by: Jia Lisha; Li Xiaofeng; Li Xinyun
- Produced by: Zhang Yuan
- Starring: Li Xinyun; Li Xiaofeng; Gai Ke; Wu Lanhui
- Cinematography: Zhang Jian
- Edited by: Wu Yixiang; Jacopo Quadri
- Music by: Andrea Guerra
- Production companies: Zhang Yuan Cultural Studio; Beijing Century Good-Tidings Cultural Development Company
- Distributed by: Zhang Yuan Cultural Studio
- Release date: 25 September 2008 (China)
- Running time: 91 minutes
- Country: China
- Language: Mandarin

Dada's Dance (simplified Chinese: 达达; traditional Chinese: 達達; pinyin: Dádá) is a 2008 Chinese film directed by the leading sixth generation director, Zhang Yuan. Unlike earlier films in his career, Dada's Dance successfully negotiated the Chinese censorship apparatus and emerged unedited and unchanged from Zhang's original cut. The film stars Li Xinyun as the titular Dada and was produced by Zhang's own Zhang Yuan Cultural Studio and the Beijing Century Good-Tidings Cultural Development Company.

The film screened once in Beijing, China during the Beijing Screenings event on 25 September 2008 and had its international premiere at the Pusan International Film Festival on 3 October 2008.

== Plot ==
Dada (Li Xinyun) is a young woman living in an unnamed central China city (filming took place in Wuhan) with her divorced mother (Gai Ke) and her mother's leering boyfriend (Wu Lanhui). Her neighbor, Zhao Ye (Li Xiaofeng) spies on her through her open window each morning as she dances to salsa music and gets ready for the day. Dada, knowing of his crush, teases him mercilessly.

Dada spends much of her time avoiding the crude passes made by her mother's boyfriend. During one of these episodes, an argument occurs and her mother's boyfriend falsely claims that Dada was adopted. Armed with this information, she drags Zhao Ye and heads south to a small village where she meets a woman who could be her birth mother.

== Cast ==
- Li Xinyun as Dada. Li, who starred as the young teacher in Zhang Yuan's previous film, Little Red Flowers plays the titular protagonist in Dada's Dance. Her birth name, Li Xiaofeng is shared by Li's primary costar, Li Xiaofeng, though the two actors use different characters for their names.
- Li Xiaofeng as Zhao Ye, Dada's neighbor who falls in love with her after he sees her dancing through his window.
- Liu Yi as Coco, Dada's best friend and confidante.
- Gai Ke as Dada's mother.
- Wu Lanhui as Chen Jun, Dada's mother's lecherous boyfriend.

== Reception ==
Shortly after the film's international premiere at the Pusan International Film Festival in October 2008, western critics deemed the film one of Zhang's lesser efforts. Early reviews from Variety and The Hollywood Reporter derided the film as "a notch down from [Zhang's] best work" and "light on substance," respectively. Bloomberg News meanwhile called the film "[s]o safe and sedate...that it's little surprise the film cleared Chinese censors without a single cut."

However, the same critics did find aspects of Dada's Dance worthy of praise. The lead actress Li Xinyun was singled out as "never less than watchable," while another critic wrote that "it is the composite of both Li's and Dada's personalities that give the film its soul." Also praised was the film's music by composer Andrea Guerra, whose score was called "ethereal" by Variety, an "unexpected treat" by Screen Daily, and one of the film's two saving graces by Bloomberg News (the other being Li Xinyun).

As of 2012, the film has not yet been released on DVD.
