= Li Yinhe =

Chinese sociologist

- Born: 4 February 1952 (age 74); Beijing, People's Republic of China
- Education: Shanxi University; University of Pittsburgh
- Occupations: Sociologist, Sexologist, Activist
- Spouse: Wang Xiaobo (m. 1980; died 1997)

Li Yinhe
- Traditional Chinese: 李銀河
- Simplified Chinese: 李银河
Transcriptions
Standard Mandarin
- Hanyu Pinyin: Lǐ Yínhé

Li Yinhe (simplified Chinese: 李银河; traditional Chinese: 李銀河; pinyin: Lǐ Yínhé; née Li Sanfan; born February 4, 1952) is a Chinese sociologist, sexologist, and activist for LGBT rights in China. Her main academic interests have been sexual norms in contemporary China, homosexuality, diverse sexual behaviors including sadomasochism, and women's studies.

== Early life and education ==
Li Yinhe was born in Beijing. Her name was changed from Li Sanfan to Li Yinhe at the age of seven. Her father, Chen Erdong was the director of the department of theories at People's Daily, and her mother was an editor. Li has two elder sisters and one elder brother. Li and her brother adopted their matrilineal surname as a realization of their parents' ideas of gender equality.

From 1974 to 1977, Li attended Shanxi University, where she studied history. From 1982 to 1998, she lived in the United States of America and obtained a Ph.D. in sociology from the University of Pittsburgh.

== Career ==
After graduating from Shanxi University, Li worked as an editor at Guangming Daily. One year later, in 1978, Li was assigned a research position at the State Council Research Office, where she gained national fame by publishing the article "To substantially promote democracy, to substantially promote the rule of law" with Lin Chunhe. In 1979, Li joined the newly founded Institute of Marxism–Leninism at the Chinese Academy of Social Sciences, where she researched marriage and family issues. After obtaining a doctorate degree from the University of Pittsburgh and returning to China, Li worked as a post-doctoral fellow under the sociologist Fei Xiaotong, then as an instructor at Peking University. In 1992, she joined the Institute of Sociology at the Chinese Academy of Social Sciences as a researcher, and later became director of the Research Office of Family and Sexuality. She worked there until her retirement in 2012.

In the 1990s, as part of her research on homosexuality, Li began to translate many important texts focused on queer theory. This included the works of Judith Butler, Steven Epstein, Gayle Rubin, and Steven Seidman, among many others.

== Activism ==
Li represents "aspiration liberalism" in China. Li has been active in calling for greater tolerance for nonconventional sexual activities in China. She argues the country is undergoing a de facto sexual revolution, and encourages people to re-examine traditional attitudes towards sexual promiscuity and homosexuality. She proposes decriminalization of orgies and prostitution (both currently illegal in China). She also believes that monogamy is a personal decision made between a couple, and should not be enforced by law or social pressure.

She was a keynote speaker at the 2006 International Conference on LGBT Human Rights in Montreal, Quebec, Canada.

Li also publicly speaks about other issues of social justice, such as the growing urban-rural divide in China.

=== Abolishing outdated criminal laws in China ===
In 2010 and 2011, Li pointed out on her blog that three criminal laws are outdated - the laws have not adapted to drastic change in public opinion. Li argued that the force of these laws is waning as there are fewer and fewer people being punished for these offenses and the punishments are becoming less severe. Li called on legislators to legalize pornography, abolish the group licentiousness law (which provides up to five years in prison for consenting adults who have sex with more than one other person), and decriminalize prostitution.

=== Same-sex marriage legislation ===
In 2000, Li proposed adding same-sex marriage to the law when the National People's Congress prepared to revise the marriage law and sought suggestions from sociologists and legal experts. Li's argument was dismissed and a law expert stated that "China doesn't need to take the lead in this matter."

In 2001, Li asked a deputy to the National People's Congress (NPC) to submit her proposal. However, the proposal was not submitted as she was unable to find 30 other deputies willing to put their names on the document so that it fulfilled the requirements for a proposal on amendments to current laws.

Since 2002, Li has continued asking members of the National Committee of the Chinese People's Political Consultative Conference (CPPCC) to submit her proposal.

== Personal life ==
Li was married to Wang Xiaobo, a well-known Chinese novelist, until his death in 1997. Li went to the US alone in 1982, but Wang joined her in 1984 on a scholarship in East Asia Studies. Li announced in December 2014 that she had been in a long-term relationship with a transgender man, Zheng Hongxia (b. 1965), for 15 years.

== Selected works and publications ==
- 《中国人的性爱与婚姻》(Sexuality and Marriage in China), Henan People's Press, 1991.
- 《他们的世界——中国男同性恋群落透视》(Their World: a Study of Homosexuality in China), co-authored, Cosmos Press, Hong Kong, 1992; Shanxi People's Press, 1993.
- 《生育与中国村落文化》(Procreation and Chinese Village Culture), Oxford University Press, Hong Kong, 1993; Chinese Social Science Press, 1994
- 《性社会学》(Human Sexuality), translated, Henan People's Press, 1994.
- 《中国婚姻家庭及其变迁》(Changing Chinese Marriage and the Family), Heilongjiang People's Press, 1995.
- 《中国女性的性与爱》(Sexuality and Love of Chinese Women), Oxford University Press, Hong Kong, 1996.
- 《女性权力的崛起》(Rising Power of the Women), Chinese Social Science Press, 1997.
- 《中国女性的感情与性》(Sexuality and Love of Chinese Women), China Today Press, 1998.
- 《同性恋亚文化》(Subculture of Homosexuality), China Today Press, 1998.
- 《虐恋亚文化》(Subculture of Sadomasochism), China Today Press, 1998.
- 《婚姻法修改论争》(The Argument of the Change for the Marriage Law), Guangming Press, 1999
- 《性的问题》(Sex Problem), Chinese Junior Press, 1999
- 《性·婚姻---东方与西方》 (Sex·Marriage - Western and Eastern), Shanxi Normal University Press, 1999
- 《女性主义》(Feminism), Taiwan Wunan Press, 2003
- 《性文化研究报告》(Sex Study Report), Jiangsu People Press, 2003
- 《女性的感情与性》(Women's Emotion and Sex), 2003
