= Sons (1996 film) =

- Film poster
- Traditional Chinese: 兒子
- Simplified Chinese: 儿子
- Hanyu Pinyin: Érzǐ
- Directed by: Zhang Yuan
- Written by: Ning Dai
- Produced by: Wang Shize; Zhang Yuan
- Starring: Fu Derong; Li Ji; Li Maojie; Li Wei
- Cinematography: Sun Hongqing; Zhang Jian
- Edited by: Fen Sihai
- Production company: Beijing Expression Culture Communication Center
- Release date: 1996
- Running time: 95 minutes
- Country: China
- Language: Mandarin

Sons is a 1996 Chinese film directed by Zhang Yuan. Detailing the collapse of a family due to alcoholism, Sons straddles the line between fiction and documentary, as the film's "actors" all play themselves in reenactments of their own lives.

Zhang came upon the idea of making a film about a family's collapse into alcoholism after hearing about the story of his downstairs neighbors, former professional dancers, and their two grown sons.

The film was privately financed and was made outside of the traditional studio system. As a result, Sons was never screened in China.

== Cast ==
- Li Maojie, the father, a former professional dancer, he has long since succumbed to alcoholism and is eventually committed to a mental asylum by his family. The father, Li Maojie, was given special permission to leave the mental asylum he had been committed to in order to film his scenes.
- Fu Derong, the mother, also a former dancer.
- Li Ji & Li Wei, Li Maojie and Fu Derong's two sons who have also begun to drink heavily. Both sons also helped guide the writing of the script by Ning Dai to accurately reflect what really happened to their family.

== Production ==
The idea of Sons came directly from the two sons of the Li family, Li Ji and Li Wei. According to Zhang, the two sons literally knocked on his door and immediately claimed that they were both the "baddest family on the block" and that their father, who had been committed to a mental institute, was also "awesome." Fascinated by this seemingly contradictory account of the Li family, Zhang agreed to make a film based on their story. In contrast to the sons, the parents of Li Ji and Li Wei were not in favor of making a film, and never fully accepted the idea of their lives being put down on film.

Shooting Sons required Zhang to simply film the Li family as they interacted with each other. In the process, Zhang became very comfortable with the family, to the extent that they would forget that cameras were around. Zhang relates one instance where the family's argument got so out of hand that Zhang had to intervene before the "actors" injured each other.

== Reception ==
Though never screened in its native China, Sons helped cement Zhang Yuan's reputation abroad as a major creative force in Chinese cinema. The film was screened in several international cities and film festivals including New York in 2001.

Sons was also one of the three Tiger Award winners at the 1996 International Film Festival Rotterdam, where it also won a FIPRESCI prize.

As for the family, the parents, Li Maojie and Fu Derong, never fully accepted the film. According to Zhang, after watching the film, "the entire family seemed to be under a heavy silence, and I could detect traces of hurt and melancholy on their faces."
