= Hao Zhou =

Australian tenor and producer (born 1967)

Hao Zhou (周浩, born 6 August 1967) is an Australian lyric tenor and theatrical producer. As a performer, he is known for the manner in which his operatic career began (as a dishwasher in a kitchen of the Victoria Arts Centre, Australia), a fluid vocal technique and unusually high top notes, and his ability to perform acrobatics while performing.

Zhou was a member of the Victoria State Opera's Young Artist Program and later a principal with Opera Australia.

As a producer, Zhou produces a variety of original music, dance and acrobatic acts in China and Australia. The first act he co-produced with the Victorian State Opera was The 3 Chinese Tenors, still active in early 2014, in 1992 for that year's annual Melbourne Asian Food Festival.
