= Karmic Mahjong =

- Film poster
- Directed by: Wang Guangli
- Written by: Wang Guangli; Huang Jinguang
- Produced by: Cory Vietor; Zhu Lei
- Starring: Francis Ng; Cherrie Ying
- Cinematography: Lu Yuqing
- Edited by: Adam Kerby; Liao Ching-sung
- Music by: John Thompson
- Release dates: April 20, 2006 (China); May 25, 2006 (Hong Kong)
- Running time: 98 minutes
- Country: China
- Languages: Mandarin; Sichuanese

Karmic Mahjong (simplified Chinese: 血战到底; traditional Chinese: 血戰到底; pinyin: xùe zhàn dào dǐ) is a 2006 Chinese comedy film directed by Wang Guangli. It stars Francis Ng as a mechanic from Chengdu plagued by bad luck and Cherrie Ying as a young woman who appears to share the same affliction. The film also features cameos by the prominent Chinese directors Wang Xiaoshuai and Jia Zhangke.

The film, a mainland production of the Shanghai Dachong Cultural Information Company and the Zhangzhou Xinchuang Cultural Information Company, nevertheless is director Wang Guangli's homage to the Hong Kong tradition of action-comedies.

== Cast ==
- Francis Ng - Wu Yu-Chuan, a down-on-his luck mechanic living in Sichuan.
- Cherrie Ying - Jia, a mother who seems to share Wu's bad luck.
- Na Wai - Yin, a mobster and Wu's childhood friend.
- Paul Chun - Qin, Yin's mobster boss.
- Liu Yiwei - Master Liu as a blind fortune teller.
- Liang Jing - Lai, Wu's wife.
- Jia Zhangke - a mobster.
- Wang Xiaoshuai - a cop.
