= Aowen Jin =

Chinese artist (born 1978)

- Born: Jin Aowen; Luoyang, China
- Education: Goldsmiths, University of London
- Occupation: Artist
- Known for: British Chinese artist and social commentator

Chinese name
- Chinese: 金翱文
- Hanyu Pinyin: Jīn Áowén
- Website: https://www.jinaowen.com/

Aowen Jin is a Chinese-born British artist and social commentator.

== Early life ==
Aowen Jin was born in Luoyang, Henan in China. She moved to the United Kingdom as a student when she was 18, and initially studied Law & Economics at Durham University. After rediscovering a passion for art she switched to studying Fine Art at Goldsmiths, University of London. During her degree she was commissioned to produce painting works for British Prime Minister Tony Blair and for Queen Elizabeth II's 80th Birthday, and was named by both Dazed & Confused magazine and The Times Magazine as one of the UK's top emerging artists. Aowen was part of Goldsmith's graduate exhibition at Free Range Shows in 2006, titled "Textile Collective".

== Sound Fountain ==
In 2013, Jin was commissioned by Goldsmiths, University of London to produce an artwork for the first official visit of British Chancellor George Osborne and London Mayor Boris Johnson to Beijing. For the commission she produced a live "Sound Fountain", made of common British garden equipment, which danced to sounds that were transmitted live from various locations around London. The artwork was exhibited in Beijing's 798 Art Zone.

== Light artworks ==
In early 2015, Jin announced that she would be creating a permanent exhibit called "i18n" at the Horniman Museum, launching in February 2015, made up of invisible paintings that could only be seen under UV light. On announcing the exhibition at the museum she said: "The founder of the museum had the most extensive collection of Chinese tea artifacts in the world. He tried to bring Chinese culture and lives back to Britain through objects and steam ships. I will try bring them to the local community by using gods and technology."

Following this project, Jin was commissioned by Birmingham Hippodrome and Arts Council England to use artworks to engage with Birmingham's Chinese community. Her artwork, named "Midlight", was an interactive light show that reacted to sound and posts on Twitter. It was exhibited at Birmingham Hippodrome, Birmingham Cathedral, and Thinktank, Birmingham Science Museum in late 2015, culminating in a Chinese New Year show at the Cathedral in February 2016.

In 2016 it was announced that Jin was selected for that year's Museums at Night project, where a new light artwork would be shown in a UK museum chosen by the public.

== Recognition ==
She was recognized as one of the BBC's 100 women in 2013 and also in 2014.
