= Wang Guangli =

Chinese film director

- Born: 1966 (age 59–60); Sichuan, China
- Occupation: Film director
- Years active: 1990s-present

Wang Guangli (Chinese: 王光利) (born November 1966), nicknamed "King Death", is a film director. A native of Sichuan—and a psychology professor by education—Wang eventually turned to film, making underground independent features that were often censored due to their political content. In 2001, however, Wang decided to obtain official state backing for his film Go For Broke, which, despite its support from the Shanghai Film Studio, was limited in its release—even domestically—due to its use of the Shanghainese dialect.

Wang has since shifted away from more serious works with the comedies Karmic Mahjong (2006) and Dangerous Games (2007).

== Filmography ==
Year	English Title	Chinese Title	Notes
1997	Maiden Work	处女作	
2001	Go for Broke	横竖横	
2006	Karmic Mahjong	血战到底	
2006	Wo Hu	臥虎	
2007	Dangerous Games	棒子老虎鸡	
2013	A Chilling Cosplay	制服	
