= Mama (1990 film) =

- Film poster
- Traditional Chinese: 媽媽
- Simplified Chinese: 妈妈
- Hanyu Pinyin: Māma
- Directed by: Zhang Yuan
- Written by: Qin Yan; Zhang Yuan; Ning Dai
- Produced by: Zhang Yuan; Qin Yan
- Starring: Yang Xiaodan; Qin Yan
- Cinematography: Zhang Jian
- Edited by: Feng Shuangyan
- Music by: Shen Jianqin
- Distributed by: Xi'an Film Studio
- Release date: May 1, 1990 (China)
- Running time: 90 minutes
- Country: China
- Language: Mandarin
- Budget: ¥100,000

Mama is a 1990 Chinese film directed by Zhang Yuan. Zhang Yuan's directorial debut, Mama is now considered a seminal film in the history of Chinese independent cinema, and by extension, as a pioneering film of the Sixth Generation of which Zhang is a member. Shot on a very low budget within Zhang Yuan's apartment, Mama follows the story of a mother and her mentally challenged adult son.

== Plot ==
The film focuses on a librarian struggling to raise her mentally handicapped son in modern-day Beijing while at the same time dealing with an absent and unresponsive husband. The story garnered much criticism from state-censors, who found the film too dark.

While the film was originally written to end on the dour note of the mother euthanizing her son, director Zhang Yuan eventually opted for a more open-ended and ambiguous conclusion.

== Production history ==
The film that was to become Mama began as a screenplay in the Children's Film Studio for a film entitled The Sun Tree as based on a story by writer Dai Qing. Zhang Yuan at the time was still a student in the Beijing Film Academy's cinematography department and was slated to serve as the film's director of photography, with Fifth Generation graduate Sun Chen slated to direct. For three months, Zhang worked with screenwriter (and planned lead actor) Qin Yan and Sun storyboarding The Sun Tree. The studio, however, ultimately decided that the film was not profitable and canceled production.

The project was then picked up by the August First Film Studio, now with Gong Yiqun set as the director. During this second production period, Zhang Yuan again was set to serve as cinematographer and conducted several location scouting trips to Dunhuang. However, August First canceled the production shortly after the 1989 Tiananmen Square protests and massacre, in part because Dai Qing had supported the demonstrations and was now a problematic figure politically.

With the project seemingly dead, Zhang Yuan and Qin Yan decided to produce the film independently, asking friends and family for funds. Zhang, Qin, and Zhang's wife, screenwriter Ning Dai also went back to rework the film's original story. The result was a film, in Zhang's words, that "was completely different" and "something much closer to the everyday reality of average Chinese people."

While Zhang Yuan's friend, director Wang Xiaoshuai, was originally set to direct, Zhang himself eventually took over directing duties.

The film was ultimately shot in 1989 in Zhang's apartment on a budget of only ¥100,000, shortly after Zhang had graduated from the BFA.

== Style ==
Filmed mostly in black and white, the film's small budget often shows in its minimalist style. Mama's small cast of characters and minimal plot would become trademarks to Zhang's films. The film is also notable as an example of Zhang's documentary leanings, as Mama also intercuts actual interviews with parents of autistic children throughout the narrative.

== Reception ==
Mama was registered with the state-run Xi'an Film Studio, but was given only a minimal distribution in its native China. Instead the film received numerous accolades abroad, screening at several international film festivals and winning the Special Jury Prize at the Nantes Three Continents Film Festival in 1991.

Today the film is considered a pioneering work and the "first independent Chinese film since 1949." It was selected to screen in the 2005 62nd Venice International Film Festival, as part of that festival's retrospective on Chinese cinema.
