= Little Red Flowers =

- Promotional poster
- Directed by: Zhang Yuan
- Written by: Ning Dai; Zhang Yuan; Wang Shuo (novel)
- Produced by: Li Bo Wen; Allen Chan; Zhang Yuan; Marco Mueller; Wang Shuo
- Starring: Dong Bo Wen; Zhao Rui; Li Xiao Feng; Chen Li
- Cinematography: Yang Tao
- Edited by: Jacopo Quadri
- Music by: Carlo Crivelli
- Distributed by: Fortissimo Films
- Release date: February 15, 2006 (Berlin)
- Running time: 91 minutes
- Country: China
- Language: Mandarin

Little Red Flowers (Chinese: 看上去很美; pinyin: kànshangqu hěn měi) is a 2006 Chinese film directed by Zhang Yuan. The film was a co-production between China's Beijing Century Good-Tidings Cultural Development Company LTD and Italy's Downtown Pictures. The Dutch company, Fortissimo Films handled worldwide sales.

The film, based on author Wang Shuo's semi-autobiographical novel, Could Be Beautiful, follows a young four-year-old boy, Fang Qiang Qiang, at a kindergarten boarding school. Deposited into a world that demands conformity (rewarded by the titular little red flowers), Qiang suffers for his bullying.

The film is Zhang's second adaptation of a novel by Wang, after 2003's I Love You.

== Cast ==
- Dong Bo Wen - Fang Qiang Qiang, the four-year-old protagonist of the film
- Zhao Rui - Miss Li, head teacher and disciplinarian
- Li Xiao Feng - Miss Tang, a younger, more kindly teacher
- Chen Li - Principal Kong

== Reception ==
Little Red Flowers has premiered at several international film festivals. It premiered at the 2006 Berlin International Film Festival on February 15, 2006, as part of the Panorama series. In Berlin, it won the C.I.C.A.E. Award. The film also premiered at other major festivals including Sundance (as part of the World Cinema competition), and Cannes where it was in-competition.
