= Tang Danian =

Chinese film director (born 1968)

Tang Danian (唐大年 1968) is a Chinese film director, screenwriter and sometime actor. He is one of the sixth generation directors.

Tang is an alumnus of Beijing Film Academy (1989). He started his work by collaborating on films such as Beijing Bastards and Beijing Bicycle.
