= Zhang Yuan (director) =

Chinese film director (born 1963)

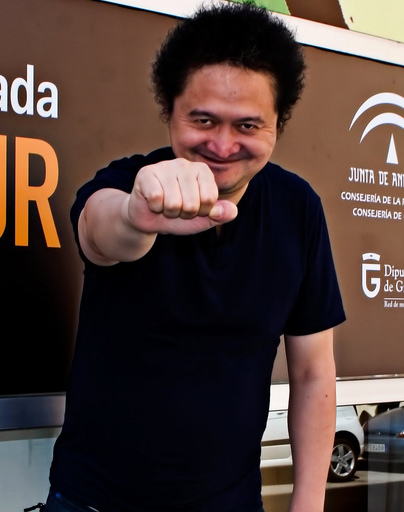
- Zhang Yuan, Cines del Sur 2007
- Born: October 1963 (age 63); Nanjing, Jiangsu
- Occupation: Film director
- Spouse: Ning Dai
- Awards: Tiger Award - Rotterdam; 1996 Sons; Best Director - Mar del Plata; 1996 East Palace, West Palace; Best Director - Gijón; 1999 Seventeen Years; Special Director's Award - Venice; 1999 Seventeen Years

Chinese name
- Traditional Chinese: 張元
- Simplified Chinese: 张元
Transcriptions
Standard Mandarin
- Hanyu Pinyin: Zhāng Yuán

Zhang Yuan (simplified Chinese: 张元; traditional Chinese: 張元; pinyin: Zhāng Yuán; born October 1963) is a Chinese film director who has been described by film scholars as a pioneering member of China's Sixth Generation of filmmakers. He and his films have won ten awards out of seventeen nominations received at international film festivals.

== Feature films ==
Born in Nanjing, the capital of Jiangsu Province, Zhang received a BA in cinematography from the Beijing Film Academy in 1989. Having initially emerged onto the film scene shortly after the Tiananmen Square protests of 1989, he is frequently referenced as an exemplar of the pioneers who are grouped into the loosely defined Sixth Generation. With a diploma from the prestigious Film Academy, Zhang eschewed his assigned position within the People's Liberation Army-connected August First Film Studio, choosing instead to produce his films independently. As a fledgling filmmaker, he chose to shoot in a documentary style and has referred to these early films (Mama, Sons, and Beijing Bastards) as "documentary feature-films."

Aside from some original short subjects he directed as a student filmmaker, the official debut of his career in 1990 is Mama, a semi-documentary account of a mother and her disabled son, which is considered to have a historical spot as one of the first features of the Sixth Generation movement and as China's "first independent film since 1949". His next film, 1993's Beijing Bastards follows Beijing's disaffected youth subculture and another title, Sons, in the same manner as Mama, blends the line between fiction and documentary film, as the actors, playing themselves, recreate the actual destruction of their family due to alcoholism and mental illness. However, the transgressive nature of these films (which depicted Chinese youth and society in harsh and unflattering imagery and terms), quickly came to the attention of the Chinese authorities. By April 1994, the Ministry of Film, Television and Culture issued a statement banning Zhang from filmmaking. Also banned were fellow Sixth-Generation directors He Jianjun, Wang Xiaoshuai, the documentary filmmaker Wu Wenguang, Fifth Generation director Tian Zhuangzhuang, and Zhang's wife, screenwriter Ning Dai, whose sister, director Ning Ying, is a transitional figure between the Fifth and Sixth Generation. In 1996, two years after the ban went into force, Zhang was ready to present his next, and most-controversial, work, the surreptitiously filmed East Palace, West Palace, also known as Behind the Forbidden City, China's first feature with homosexual characters and, furthermore, their persecution by the police. A print was secretly taken out of China and screened at the 1997 Cannes Film Festival.

After East Palace, West Palace, Zhang's style began to shift away from documentary-like neo-realist dramas to more conventionally filmed features. 1999's Seventeen Years, a family drama and also the first Chinese film with approval to shoot inside a Chinese prison, proved a significant international success winning the Best Director award at the Venice Film Festival. 2002–2003 saw Zhang approaching more commercially viable works in his most prolific period yet, directing three films in the course of a year. The cinematic version of the Communist opera Jiang Jie, the celebrity-helmed romantic mystery Green Tea, and the romantic drama I Love You were successful, if a far cry from his earlier "underground" works. In 2006, he directed Little Red Flowers, based on writer and Chinese cultural icon Wang Shuo's semi-autobiographical novel It Could Be Beautiful. The film garnered a CICAE award at the 2006 Berlin Film Festival.

== Documentaries ==
Between his feature film efforts, Zhang strives to continue producing long-form documentaries. 1994's The Square documents daily life in Tiananmen Square, in the immediate years following the events of the 1989 Democracy demonstrations. The surreptitious shoot took the guise of a program production crew for China Central Television (CCTV).

The late 1990s, meanwhile, saw Zhang indulging again in his interest in documentary form with Demolition and Relocation in 1998, an account of the destruction of Beijing's Hutongs. In 1999, Zhang made Crazy English, which followed Crazy English-founder and motivational speaker Li Yang in a film Zhang himself described as a cross between Triumph of the Will and Forrest Gump. 2000's Miss Jin Xing, meanwhile, follows Zhang's interest in society's marginalized with a touching portrait of China's most famed transgender individual, Jin Xing, who in 1996 came out as a trans woman. Jin's story is told through a series of interviews with those who know her as well as with Jin herself.

== Other media ==
Besides films, Zhang has also directed numerous music videos and commercials. His most fruitful collaboration was with Chinese musician Cui Jian, resulting in several music videos, including the winner of the Best Asian Video, Wild in the Snow, at the 1991 MTV Music Video Awards. In 2000 he was a member of the jury at the 22nd Moscow International Film Festival.

== Filmography ==
Year	English Title	Chinese Title	Pinyin	Notes
1990	Mama	妈妈	Māma	
1993	Beijing Bastards	北京杂种	Běijīng zá zhǒng	
1994	The Square	广场	Guǎng chǎng	Documentary
1996	Sons	儿子	Érzi	
1996	Danish Girls Show Everything	丹麦姑娘		Vignette in a comic anthology film
1997	East Palace, West Palace	东宫西宫	Dōng gōng xī gōng	Screened at Cannes
1998	Demolition and Relocation	钉子户	Ding zi hu	Short documentary
1999	Crazy English	疯狂英语	Fēng kuáng yīng yǔ	Documentary
1999	Seventeen Years	过年回家	Guò nián huí jiā	
2000	Miss Jin Xing	金星小姐	Jin xing xiaojie	Short documentary
2000	Hainan Hainan	海南，海南	Hainan Hainan	
2002	I Love You	我爱你	Wǒ ài nǐ	
2003	Jiang Jie (a film of the opera Sister Jiang)	江姐	Jiang jie	
2003	Green Tea	绿茶	Lǜ Chá	
2006	Little Red Flowers	看上去很美	Kànshangqu hěn měi	
2008	Dada's Dance	达达	Dádá	
2013	Beijing Flickers	有种	Yǒu Zhǒng	
