= Beijing Bastards =

1993 Chinese-Hong Kong film by Zhang Yuan

- Film poster
- Directed by: Zhang Yuan
- Written by: Cui Jian; Tang Danian
- Produced by: Cui Jian; Zhang Yuan; Shu Kei; Christopher Doyle
- Starring: Cui Jian; Faye Yu; Zang Tianshuo; Li Wei; Wang Wenli; Wu Lala
- Cinematography: Zhang Jian
- Edited by: Feng Shuangyuan
- Music by: Cui Jian; Dou Wei; He Yong
- Release date: September 17, 1993 (China)
- Running time: 88 minutes
- Countries: China; Hong Kong
- Language: Mandarin

Beijing Bastards (simplified Chinese: 北京杂种; traditional Chinese: 北京雜種; pinyin: Běijīng Zázhǒng) is a 1993 drama film by Sixth Generation director Zhang Yuan, and is one of the first independently produced Chinese films.

== Cast ==
- Li Wei (李委) – Karzi, a "rock promoter"
- Faye Yu
- Cui Jian as himself
- Wu Lala (武啦啦) – Wu Gang, an usher and sound-man
- Tang Danian (唐大年) – Screenwriter
- Bian Jing (边境) as himself
- Zang Tianshuo as himself
- Wang Wenli (王文丽)
