= East Palace, West Palace =

- Film poster
- Traditional Chinese: 東宮西宮
- Simplified Chinese: 东宫西宫
- Hanyu Pinyin: Dōng Gōng Xī Gōng
- Directed by: Zhang Yuan
- Written by: Wang Xiaobo; Zhang Yuan
- Produced by: Christophe Jung; Christophe Ménager; Zhang Yuan; Willy Tsao
- Starring: Si Han; Hu Jun; Zhao Wei
- Cinematography: Zhang Jian
- Edited by: Vincent Lévy
- Music by: Xiang Min
- Distributed by: Fortissimo Films
- Release date: November 1996 (Mar del Plata)
- Running time: 94 minutes
- Country: China
- Language: Mandarin

East Palace, West Palace (Chinese: 东宫西宫; pinyin: Dōng gōng xī gōng) is a 1996 Chinese film directed by Zhang Yuan, starring Hu Jun and Si Han, and based on a short story by writer Wang Xiaobo. It is also known as Behind the Forbidden City or Behind the Palace Gates.

East Palace, West Palace is the first mainland Chinese movie with an explicitly homosexual theme. The title of the movie is derived from two public toilets near the Forbidden City, referred to as the East Palace and the West Palace. These toilets were well known for being places of nighttime congregation for homosexuals.

== Plot ==
Homosexuality in China is not illegal, but homosexuals are routinely persecuted by police and arrested for "hooliganism". The film focuses on a young gay writer called A-Lan who, being attracted to a young policeman named Xiao Shi, manages to have himself arrested and interrogated for a whole night. His life-story, which he tells during the interrogation, reflects the general repression of Chinese society. Xiao Shi's attitude shifts from the initial revulsion to fascination and, finally, to attraction.

== Cast ==
- Si Han as A-Lan
- Hu Jun as Xiao Shi
- Zhao Wei as Classmate in white shirt
- Jing Ye as A-Lan as a youth
- Liu Yuxiao as female thief
- Ma Wen as Yamen runner
- Wang Quan as A-Lan (young)
- Lu Rong as A-Lan's mother
- Zhao Xiaoyu as cop
- Yang Jian as cop

== Production ==
The film was shot in the spring of 1996, when it was smuggled out of China for post-production in France. The film was produced by Christophe Menager, Christophe Jung, and Zhang Yuan, executive produced by Willy Tsao, associate produced by Zhang Yukang, and edited by Vincent Lévy, with sound by Wu Gang, Shen Jiaqin, and Bruno Lecoeur, music by Xiang Min, and art direction by An Bing; its director of photography was Jian Zhang. Its screenplay was written by Zhang Yuan and Wang Xiaobo. It was produced by Amazon Entertainment Limited and Quelqu'un d'Autre Productions and distributed by Fortissimo Films.

== Release ==
East Palace, West Palace premiered at the Mar del Plata Film Festival in Argentina in November 1996 and at the 1997 Cannes Film Festival as part of the Un Certain Regard competition.

== Reception ==
East Palace, West Palace received mostly positive reviews. On the review aggregator website Rotten Tomatoes, 83% of 6 critics' reviews are positive, with an average rating of 6.7/10. Lawrence Van Gelder of the New York Times described the film as "powerful drama and courageous politics," and Kevin Thomas of the Los Angeles Times praised Si and Hu's performances, calling the film "bold and daring" and reading it as a critique of authoritarian government. In Variety, Derek Elley provided a more negative review, describing the film as "beautifully shot" but also criticizing its portrayal of homosexuality as dated and describing A-Lan's repeated flashbacks as repetitive.

== See also ==
- Homosexuality in China
- Men and Women (1999) by Liu Bingjian, a story of love resisted and love regained
- Lan Yu (2001) by Stanley Kwan, a story set in modern Beijing with homosexual themes
- Star Appeal (2004) by Cui Zi'en, a gay science-fiction film
- My Fair Son (2005) by Cui Zi'en, a story of a teenage boy in love with an older man
- Spring Fever (2009) by Lou Ye, a story of a love triangle between three young adults
- Bad Romance (2011) by François Chang, a story of the affairs of several young couples in modern Beijing, based on the lyrics of the Lady Gaga song
