= Golden Week (China) =

National public holidays in China

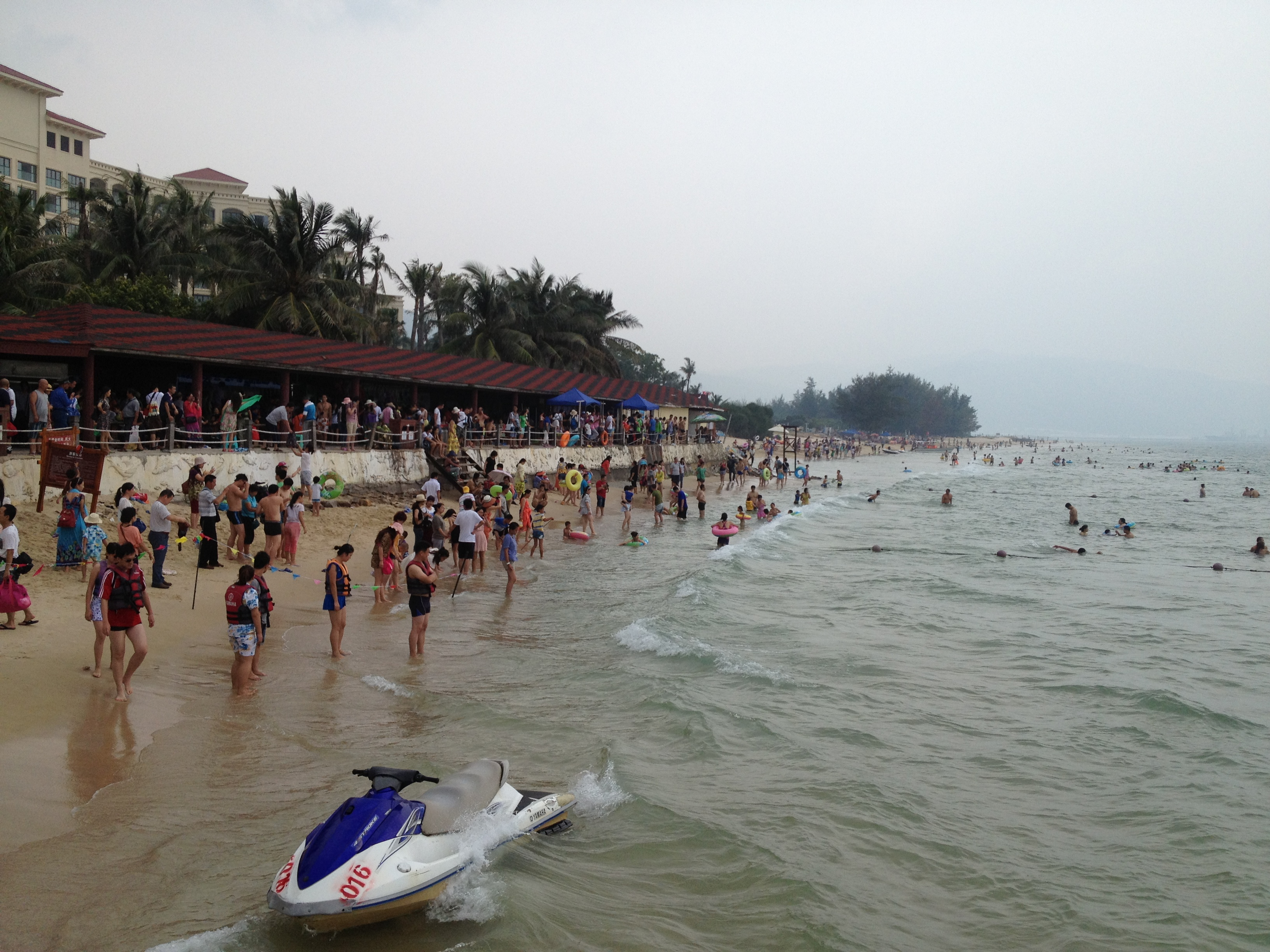
A busy Yalong Bay in Sanya during the Golden Week in 2013

The Golden Week (Chinese: 黄金周; pinyin: Huángjīn Zhōu), in China, is the name given to three separate seven-day or eight-day national holidays, which were implemented in 2000:

- Spring Festival, the Golden Week around the Chinese new year, begins in January or February.
- The "Labor Day (May Day) Golden Week" begins May 1 and was reintroduced in 2019 after being discontinued in 2007.
- The "National Day Golden Week" begins around October 1. If Mid-Autumn Festival is near National Day, the Golden Week may be eight days long.

Three or four (if Mid-Autumn Festival is near National Day) days of paid leave are given, and surrounding weekends are rescheduled so that workers always have seven or eight continuous days off. These national holidays were first started by the government for China's National Day in 1999 and are primarily intended to help expand the domestic tourism market and improve the national standard of living as well as allowing people to make long-distance family visits. Golden Weeks are consequently periods of heightened travel activity.

== National Day Golden Week statistics ==
Year	Travelers (estimated)
1999	28 million
2007	120 million
2014	475 million
2015	526 million
2016	589 million
2017	705 million
2020	637 million

== Changes and evolution ==
In 2004, there were calls to shorten Golden Week's duration due to its disruption of the regular economy.

In 2006, delegates to the Chinese People's Political Consultative Conference brought up proposals to cancel both the National Day and May Day Golden Weeks, arguing that the holidays have not achieved significant results in promoting internal consumption, which was the original intention for these long holiday weeks. Rather, the delegates said, these Golden Weeks have disrupted people's regular 5-day weekly schedule and is increasingly impeding commerce and international trade, as many key government agencies, especially those related to customs, tax/tariff collection, and legal affairs, are shut down for seven days. Instead, they proposed, these days off should be spread out to other traditional holidays not currently recognized as public holidays, including Mid-Autumn Festival, Dragon Boat Festival, and Qingming Festival. Golden Weeks were sustained as weekly holidays through 2007.

On December 16, 2007, China's official Xinhua News Agency reported that the Chinese population was to have a further three national holidays and lose only one of its golden weeks, the May Day holiday, according to the calendar reform that the government has approved. May Day itself now became a one-day holiday. Three traditional festivals—Mid-Autumn Festival, Dragon Boat Festival, and Qingming Festival—were added to the list of public holidays. The Chinese New Year and National Day would remain three-day holidays, though in the Chinese New Year extra holiday days are de facto added by adjusting the weekend days before and after the three days holiday, resulting in a full week of public holiday. According to Xinhua, with this calendar revision, the Chinese government aimed to recover the customs associated with traditional festivals and balance tourist demand during the weeks of holidays. In practice, the new calendar, which came into force on January 1, 2008, would increase national holidays from 10 to 11 days. A spokesperson for the National Commission for Development and Reform said that the new plan would ratify Chinese traditions, better distribute holidays and prevent the "overcrowding" of the "golden weeks" when more people travel during the new holidays and during the periods of paid holidays.

In 2020, the Chinese government reported that more than 637 million people traveled within China, creating around 466 billion yuan ($68.6 billion) in tourism revenue, during their country's annual "Golden Week", despite being in the midst of the COVID-19 pandemic.

== See also ==
- Mudik (Indonesian equivalent)
- Balik Kampung (Malaysian equivalent)
- Chunyun
- Golden Week in Japan
- Holidays in the People's Republic of China

== Notes and references ==
- ""Golden Week" holidays loses favour: survey". China Daily. Xinhua. October 21, 2004.
- Sun Yunlong (December 30, 2007). "Xinhua top 10 domestic news events in 2007". China View. Xinhua. Archived from the original on August 9, 2011.
