= Ge Hu (disambiguation) =

Ge Hu may refer to:

- Gehu or ge hu (革胡; pinyin: géhú), Chinese musical instrument
- Ge Lake or Ge Hu
- ge-hu or tauge tahu, see Chinese Indonesian cuisine

Given name Ge surname Hu

- Hu Ge (actor) (胡歌, born 1982), Chinese actor and singer
- Hu Ge (director) (胡戈, born 1974), Chinese internet satirist
- Hu Ge (artist/director), Chinese artist

== See also ==
- Hu Ge (disambiguation)
- Hu (disambiguation)
- Ge (disambiguation)
