= Hu Ge (disambiguation) =

Hu Ge (胡歌; born 1982) is a Chinese actor and singer.

Hu Ge may also refer to:

- Hu Ge (director) (胡戈 1974), internet humorist and amateur director
- Hu Ge (artist/director), founder of WAZA in China

== See also ==
- Ge Hu (disambiguation)
- Huge (disambiguation)
- Hu (disambiguation)
- Ge (disambiguation)
