= Huges =

Huges is a surname. Notable people with the surname include:

- Bart Huges (1934–2004), Dutch librarian
- Jan Huges (1904–1986), Dutch rower

== See also ==
- Hughes (surname)
- Huge (disambiguation)
- Huger
