= Monk Comes Down the Mountain =

- Film poster
- Directed by: Chen Kaige
- Screenplay by: Chen Kaige; Zhang Ting
- Based on: Dao Shi Xia Shan by Xu Haofeng
- Produced by: Chen Hong
- Starring: Wang Baoqiang; Aaron Kwok; Chang Chen; Lin Chi-ling; Fan Wei; Yuen Wah; Vanness Wu; Wang Xueqi; Danny Chan; Lam Suet; Dong Qi
- Cinematography: Geoffrey Simpson
- Edited by: Wayne Wahrman
- Music by: Klaus Badelt
- Production companies: New Classics Media; Columbia Pictures
- Distributed by: New Classics Media
- Release dates: July 3, 2015 (China); December 6, 2015 (United States)
- Running time: 123 minutes
- Countries: China; United States
- Languages: Mandarin; English
- Box office: US$64.2 million

Monk Comes Down the Mountain (Chinese: 道士下山) is a 2015 Chinese fantasy-adventure-comedy film directed by Chen Kaige and starring Wang Baoqiang, Aaron Kwok, Chang Chen, Lin Chi-ling, Fan Wei, Yuen Wah, Vanness Wu, Wang Xueqi, Danny Chan, Lam Suet and Dong Qi. It is based on the best-selling novel Dao Shi Xia Shan (A Monk Comes Down the Mountain) by Xu Haofeng. Filming started in March 2014 on location in Xianghe, Hebei. The film was released on July 3, 2015. It was the first movie with DTS:X and was available in IMAX 3D.

== Plot ==
Anxia is a simple monk living in a secluded Taoist temple. One day he's asked to leave the temple partly because of his trouble-making but also because the master wishes for him to experience the outside world. Upon descending from the mountain, Anxia quickly finds himself in a city where he meets Tsui Daoning, a doctor of Chinese medicine as well as the owner an Apothecary; Tsui, partly because he feels sorry for the younger man and partly because he finds his antics funny, decides to take Anxia in as his apprentice.

As he's working, Anxia comes to learn that Tsui has a much younger brother named Daorong who's not only a never-do-well that's constantly in debt but is also secretly having an affair with Tsui Daorong's wife.

One night, the younger Daorong kills his brother using medicine provided unwittingly by the wife.

Anxia wishes for the wife and brother to respect Daorong's spirit by remaining home, despite knowing the pair are responsible for his death, but they ignore him and go out to celebrate on a hired boat. However, during the ride, the lovers wind up getting into an argument which leads to a struggle that causes the ship to spring a leak. Panicking, Daorong and the wife try to escape only to find they're locked inside the sinking boat.

Anxia dives to the boat, but instead of saving them, he lets the couple drown for their crimes. Despite having avenged his master, Anxia feels guilt for his inaction and goes to a Buddhist temple in an attempt to atone for it. There, he meets an Abbott who's aware of his crime and scolds him for it. He then tells hI’m that if he wishes to be free from his burden he must meditate in the temple for 7 days.

After doing so, he returns to the Apothecary where he meets a man called Zhao Zinchuan who buys some internal medicine for his master for an upcoming match. Anxia follows Zhao and witnesses the match between Zhao and his master, Peng Qianwu. Zhao defeats Peng and Peng admits Zhao should be the leader of his school over his son. However, as they prepare to leave, Peng stabs Zhao in the back using a hidden blade within his umbrella.

Peng Qianwu's son, Peng Qizi, goes to the Apothecary for medicine for his father who sustained injuries in the fight with Zhao. He and Qizi share a meal with some poisoned meat which makes them hallucinate. In their stupor, they go to the temple residence of Zhou Xiyu in order to steal his collection box, however, they're caught by Zhou who cures them. Anxia remains in an attempt to be Zhou's disciple.

Qizi returns and informs his father about Zhou where it's revealed they were once disciples at a martial arts school run by Peng Qianqu's father. The aligning master of the school, Peng's father, had wanted Zhou to lead after him but Zhou had left to avoid conflict. Peng Qianqu later appears at the temple to confront Zhou, accusing him of stealing the Ape Strike technique. Zhou, in an attempt to placate Peng, hands over a book whereby he'd written down everything about the technique; having developed it alongside his partner, Boss Cha. However, Peng is not interested in the volumes and attacks Zhou who soundly defeats him. Peng returns home with severe injuries, leading Qizi to shoot Zhou multiple times from the shadows in revenge.

Anxia brings the dying Zhou to the Buddhist temple so Zhou can find peace of mind before he dies. Instead of comforting Zhou, the temple Abbott throw water in his face and tells him that life is like a ladle thrown by the gods and that these consequences are because of Karma. Zhou understands and states that his dying regret is that he never had a chance to see his friend again. The Abbott tells him that he can always see the person in his mind's eyes which allows Zhou to die content.

Anxia then seeks out Boss Cha, wishing to kill Peng Qianqu whom he believes to be the shooter, unaware Zhou was killed by his son. Boss Cha is a famous theatrical performer. Anxia tells Cha about Zhou's murder and Cha takes leave from his performance to seek out Peng. This angers his patron Zhao Liren who feels he has lost face over the cancelled performance.

Zhao plots with Peng to ambush Boss Cha with Peng's men. Cha survives the ambush and defeats Peng and his men. Cha is about to kill Peng Qianqu when Peng Qizi admits to being the murderer. Peng Qianqu then kills himself with Cha's spear and tells him that he is atoning for his son's actions.

The movie ends with Cha and Anxia practicing the Ape Strike technique on a mountain top.

== Cast ==
- Wang Baoqiang
- Aaron Kwok
- Chang Chen
- Lin Chi-ling
- Fan Wei
- Yuen Wah
- Vanness Wu
- Wang Xueqi
- Danny Chan Kwok-kwan
- Lam Suet
- Dong Qi
- Li Xuejian
- Tian Zhuangzhuang
- Tiger Chen
- Jaycee Chan

== Box office ==
The film earned US$28 million in its 3-day opening and US$38.25 million in its 4-day opening weekend in China, debuting at first place at the Chinese box office.
