= Wang Xueqi =

Chinese actor

- Born: 19 March 1946 (age 80); Beijing, Republic of China
- Years active: 1984–present
- Awards: Asian Film Awards for Best Actor; 2010 Bodyguards and Assassins Hong Kong Film Critics Society Awards – Best Actor; 2010 Bodyguards and Assassins Golden Horse Awards – Best Supporting Actor; 2009 Forever Enthralled Golden Rooster Awards – Best Supporting Actor; 2009 Forever Enthralled

Chinese name
- Traditional Chinese: 王學圻
- Simplified Chinese: 王学圻
Transcriptions
Standard Mandarin
- Hanyu Pinyin: Wáng Xuéqí

Wang Xueqi (Chinese: 王学圻; born 19 March 1946) is a Chinese film actor whose career has spanned over 25 years. He was often cast in early Fifth Generation films, such as Chen Kaige's Yellow Earth (1984) and The Big Parade (1986), Huang Jianxin's Samsara, and Zhang Yimou's Codename Cougar (1989). He has since carved out a niche in the Chinese market as a character actor.

He has recently appeared in award-winning roles in Forever Enthralled (2008) and Bodyguards and Assassins (2009).

Wang has also directed one film, Sun Bird, which the screenwriter Yang Liping also co-directed. The film won a Special Grand Prize of the Jury at the Montreal World Film Festival.

== Filmography ==
Director
Year	Title	Notes
1998	Sun Bird 太阳鸟	Co-directed with Yang Liping

Actor
Year	Title	Role	Notes
1984	Yellow Earth 黄土地	Gu Qiang	
1986	The Big Parade 大阅兵	Li Weicheng	
1988	Samsara 轮回	Police Officer	
1989	Codename Cougar 代號美洲豹	Huang Jinru	
1994	Cradle on Wheels 带轱辘的摇篮	Qiangzi	Golden Deer Awards for Best Actor at the Changchun Film Festival
1994	In the Heat of the Sun 阳光灿烂的日子	Father	
1994	Country Teachers 凤凰琴	Sun Shihai	
1995	Warrior Lanling 兰陵王		
1995	Sun Valley 日光峡谷	Black Bull	
1998	Sun Bird 太阳鸟	Yuen Wen	
1999	Flag of the Republic 共和国之旗		
2000	To Be with You Forever 相伴永远	Fuchun Li	Huabiao Film Awards for Outstanding Actor; Nominated - Golden Rooster Awards for Best Actor
2000	The Red Suit 红西服		Jury Prize at the Beijing Student Film Festival
2001	Sun Flower 葵花劫	Stationmaster	
2003	Warriors of Heaven and Earth 天地英雄	Master An	Nominated - Golden Rooster Awards for Best Supporting Actor
2008	Forever Enthralled 梅蘭芳	Shisan Yan	Golden Rooster Awards for Best Supporting Actor; Golden Horse Awards for Best Supporting Actor; Nominated - Asian Film Awards for Best Supporting Actor
2009	Wheat 麦田	Lord Ju Cong	
2009	The Founding of a Republic 建國大業	Li Zongren	
2010	Bodyguards and Assassins 十月圍城	Li Yutang	Hong Kong Film Critics Society Awards for Best Actor; Asian Film Awards for Best Actor; Nominated - Hong Kong Film Award for Best Actor
2010	Chongqing Blues	Lin Quanhai	
2010	Reign of Assassins		
2010	Sacrifice 赵氏孤儿	Tu Angu	
2011	The Founding of a Party 建党伟业	Cai Yuanpei	
2011	A Disappearing Village		
2012	Caught in the Web		
2013	Iron Man 3	Dr. Wu	
2013	The Rooftop	Lei Ge	
2013	Out of Inferno		
2014	The Intruder		
2015	Helios	Song Ahn (宋鞍), a senior official from China government who advocates the use of diplomatic means to deal with the crisis. He also advocates DC8 to remain in Hong Kong.	
2015	Monk Comes Down the Mountain		
2017	Sky Hunter		
2019	Empress of the Ming	Yongle Emperor	
2019	Skyfire		

=== Variety show ===
Year	English title	Chinese title	Role	Notes
2021	China in Classics	典籍里的中国	Sima Qian	

Awards and achievements
Asian Film Awards
Preceded by Masahiro Motoki for Departures	Best Actor; 2010 for Bodyguards and Assassins	Succeeded by Ha Jung-woo for The Yellow Sea
Hong Kong Film Critics Society Awards
Preceded by Nick Cheung for Beast Stalker	Best Actor; 2009 for Bodyguards and Assassins	Succeeded by Teddy Robin for Gallants
