= 2nd Beijing College Student Film Festival =

1995 film festival in Beijing, China

The 2nd Beijing College Student Film Festival (simplified Chinese: 第二届北京大学生电影节; traditional Chinese: 第二屆北京大學生電影節) was held in 1995 in Beijing, China.

== Awards ==
- Best Film Award: Back to Back, Face to Face, Family Scandal
- Best Actor Award: Niu Zhenhua for Back to Back, Face to Face
- Best Actress Award: Ding Jiali for No More Applause
- Best Visual Effects Award: Going East To Native Land, Red Firecracker, Green Firecracker
- Special Award for Comedy: Fool in Love
- Artistic Exploration Award: None
- Committee Special Award: Country Teachers
- Special Jury Award: Mr. Wang's Burning Desire
