= He Qun =

Chinese filmmaker

- Born: December 7, 1955; Nanjing, Jiangsu, China
- Died: December 31, 2016 (aged 61)
- Education: Beijing Film Academy
- Occupations: Film director, Art director
- Years active: 1980s–2016
- Awards: Golden Rooster Awards – Best Film: 1994 Country Teachers

He Qun (Chinese: 何群; 7 December 1955 – 31 December 2016) was a Chinese filmmaker. A graduate of the 1982 class of the Beijing Film Academy, he was an inaugural member of China's "Fifth Generation" movement.

== Early life ==
He was born in 1955 in Nanjing, Jiangsu. Like many of his generation, his early life was thrown into turmoil by the Cultural Revolution. His father, an artist, was denounced as a rightist, and He was sent to the outskirts of Beijing where he did manual labor as a welder for six years. In 1978, He was admitted to the Beijing Film Academy in its art department, and was assigned to the Guangxi Film Studio when he graduated in 1982.

== Career ==
He's early career was as an art director, where he worked on many important films of the early Fifth Generation movement, including The Big Parade (1986, directed by Chen Kaige) and Widow Village (1988, directed by Wang Jin).

In 1988, he began his career in direction with the war film Mutiny. Since then, he has directed films of several genres, including gangster films (Westbound Convict Train, 1989), comedies (Once Conned, 1992) and mysteries (The Vanished Woman, 1992). In 1993, He found critical success with his rural drama Country Teachers, which won the Golden Rooster Award for best picture.

== Selected filmography ==
=== As art director ===
Year	English Title	Chinese Title	Director
1983	One and Eight	一个和八个	Zhang Junzhao
1986	The Big Parade	大阅兵	Chen Kaige
1988	Widow Village	寡妇村	Wang Jin
1990	The Wedding Maidens	出嫁女	Wang Jin

=== As director ===
Year	English Title	Chinese Title	Notes
1988	Mutiny	哗变	
1989	Westbound Convict Train	西行囚车	Also known as Prison Car to the West
1991	Steel Meets Fire	烈火金刚	
1992	Once Conned	上一当	
1992	The Vanished Woman	消失的女人	Also known as The Woman Who Disappeared
1993	Country Teachers	凤凰琴	
1996	The Strangers in Beijing	混在北京	

=== As actor ===
Year	English title	Chinese title	Role	Notes
2001	The Grand Mansion Gate	大宅门	A worker in a pawnshop	
