= Tang Yun =

Chinese violinist and actor

Tang Yun (唐韵) is a violinist and a child actor from China. His most prominent performance was his role in the 2002 movie Together, directed by Chen Kaige.
