= Forever Enthralled =

- Film poster

Chinese name
- Traditional Chinese: 梅蘭芳
- Simplified Chinese: 梅兰芳
- Literal meaning: Mei Lanfang
Transcriptions
Standard Mandarin
- Hanyu Pinyin: Méi Lánfāng
Yue: Cantonese
- Jyutping: mui4 laan4 fong1
- Directed by: Chen Kaige
- Written by: Chang Chia-lu; Geling Yan; Chen Kuo-fu
- Produced by: Han Sanping; Du Jiayi
- Starring: Leon Lai; Zhang Ziyi; Sun Honglei; Masanobu Andō
- Cinematography: Zhao Xiaoshi
- Edited by: Zhou Ying
- Music by: Zhao Jiping
- Distributed by: China Film Group
- Release date: December 5, 2008 (China)
- Running time: 146 minutes
- Country: China
- Language: Mandarin
- Budget: $15 million

Forever Enthralled (Chinese: 梅蘭芳) is a Chinese biographical film directed by Chen Kaige; the film marks Chen's eleventh feature film as a director. Forever Enthralled follows the life of Mei Lanfang, one of China's premiere opera performers. It stars Leon Lai as Mei, Zhang Ziyi, Sun Honglei and Masanobu Andō.

Known during production as Mei Lanfang, the film's English title was changed in November 2008, shortly before its release, to Forever Enthralled.

The film was shown in competition at the 2009 Berlin International Film Festival for the Golden Bear award.

== Production ==
Forever Enthralled was produced on a budget of $15 million (US) by the China Film Group and Taiwan's China Magnetics Corporation Company (CMC Company), which had previously helped fund John Woo's Red Cliff and Alexi Tan's Blood Brothers. Unlike Chen's previous film, The Promise, Chen did not re-team with his usual producers, Etchie Stroh and Moonstone Entertainment.

Just prior to the film's release in December 2008, Forever Enthralled producer, the China Film Group, ran into legal hurdles after it was sued by another production company, Milimeter. Milimeter claimed that it held the copyright to the film based on a contract signed between the two companies in 2004.

In an interview with Newsweek, director Chen Kaige stated that in contrast with his previous film about Beijing opera, "Farewell My Concubine is fiction" whereas "Mei Lanfang existed in history." In Farewell, Chen had more freedom with the story (based on Lilian Lee's novel), but with the biographical Mei Lanfang, Chen was more careful as the film was made under the blessings of Mei Lanfang's family and Chen consulted with Mei's son about the film's story. Chen revealed that many topics, such as Mei's extramarital affair, were "taboo" to the family, but that Mei's son told Chen to "do whatever you want to do" so long as the film deals with those topics with respect.

== Cast ==
- Leon Lai as Mei Lanfang. Before Lai was tapped to play the famous opera singer, Chen Kaige reportedly also considered Taiwanese star Leehom Wang. Lai, along with Zhang Ziyi, underwent training with veteran Peking Opera singers to ready themselves for their roles.
- Zhang Ziyi as Meng Xiaodong, Mei Lanfang's lover.
- Wang Xueqi as Shisan Yan, a veteran opera singer.
- Sun Honglei as Qiu Rubai
- Chen Hong as Fu Zhifang as Mei Lanfang's wife.
- Masanobu Andō; Japanese actor Ando joined the cast along with Gillian Chung and Chen Hong. Actor Kimura Takuya was also considered for the role as an opera-obsessed Japanese army officer, Tanaka Ryuichi, who befriends Mei Lanfang.

=== Peking opera vocals ===
- Mei Baojiu for his father Mei Lanfang
- Wang Peiyu for Meng Xiaodong
- Zhang Ke for Shisan Yan

=== Previous casting ===
- Gillian Chung as Fu Zhifang as a young woman; the Hong Kong actress joined the cast of the film as Mei Lanfang's wife shortly after it began principal photography, along with actors Chen Hong and Masanobu Andō, in July 2007. After she completed her scenes, Chung faced some controversy as a result of her involvement in the Edison Chen photo scandal. Rumors swirled that her scenes would be cut due to public outcry, though producers at China Film Group initially announced that they would keep her in the film and that she would participate in the film's publicity. The decision to keep Chung was reportedly met with disapproval by Mei Lanfang's family. By November 2008, the film's producers confirmed that Chung had indeed been cut from the film, thought it was unclear whether the decision was made because of the scandal, or it was made by the SARFT, or was the result of bowing to Mei Lanfang's family's wishes.

== Reviews ==
The film made its international premiere in competition at the 59th Berlin International Film Festival, where critics called it a "sumptuous" film.

The Hollywood Reporter describes the film as "traditional but elegantly mounted," and although less exotic than Farewell My Concubine, Chen "exhibits a firm grasp of subject, sympathetic characterization and a connoisseur's eye for the cultural milieu of 1930s-'40s China." The review writes the film's art direction as "superb" and states "from splendidly lit interiors to authentic costumes and accessories, evoking the theater culture and literati scene of 1930s Beijing."

However, Variety on the other hand states the film is a "largely workmanlike biopic" that is only "occasionally engaging." Variety describes the film's supporting performances are strong and more so than the leading performances, and the film "rarely achieves the artistic elevation it strives for." The review did however gave praise to the film's production design, costume and cinematography.
