= Yellow Earth =

- Theatrical release poster
- 黄土地
- Directed by: Chen Kaige
- Written by: Chen Kaige; Zhang Ziliang (screenplay); Lan Ke (novel)
- Starring: Xueqi Wang; Bai Xue; Quiang Liu; Tuo Tan
- Cinematography: Zhang Yimou
- Edited by: Pei Xiaonan
- Music by: Zhao Jiping
- Production company: Guanxi Film Studio
- Release date: 1984
- Running time: 89 minutes
- Country: China
- Language: Mandarin

Yellow Earth
- Simplified Chinese: 黄土地
- Traditional Chinese: 黃土地
- Literal meaning: "Yellow Soil"
Transcriptions
Standard Mandarin
- Hanyu Pinyin: Huáng tǔdì
- IPA: [xwǎŋ tʰùtî]

Yellow Earth (simplified Chinese: 黄土地; traditional Chinese: 黃土地; pinyin: Huáng tǔdì) is a 1984 Chinese drama film. It tells the story of a young, village girl who bravely resists old-dated customs and searches for freedom. It was the directorial debut for Chen Kaige. The film's notable cinematography is by Zhang Yimou. At the 24th Hong Kong Film Awards ceremony on 27 March 2005, a list of 100 Best Chinese Motion Pictures was tallied, and Yellow Earth came in fourth. The film was produced by Guangxi Film Studio (simplified Chinese: 广西电影制片厂; traditional Chinese: 廣西電影製片廠; pinyin: Guǎngxī Diànyǐngzhìpiàn Chǎng).

Zhang Yimou, a colleague of Chen, photographed the film. Richard James Havis, author of Changing the Face of Chinese Cinema: An Interview with Chen Kaige, said that the film was the first Chinese film "at least since the 1949 Communist Liberation, to tell a story through images rather than dialog." Therefore, the film attracted controversy in China. Havis added that the film "was also equivocal about the Communist Party's ability to help the peasants during the Communist revolution", a position which differed from that espoused by the propaganda films that were produced after 1949."

== Plot ==
Gu Qing, an officer from the propaganda department of the CCP (Chinese Communist Party) Eighth Route Army in CCP-controlled Shaanxi, travels alone from Yan'an to the northern KMT-controlled area of Shaanxi, Shanbei, in the early spring of 1939, with the task of collecting the peasants' folk songs in order to re-write them with communist lyrics in order to boost the morale of the Eighth Route Army soldiers.

The film opens with Gu Qing walking several miles through a dry rural landscape. He reaches a small village where he witnesses the wedding of a very young girl to an adult man, and is assigned to live with a poor as well as illiterate family. The father in the family, an old widower, dislikes Gu's re-telling of social reforms about women receiving education and choosing who they will marry on their own terms within the communist domain in the province's south. Cui Qiao, his hard-working daughter, happily listens to his tales and is joyful when her younger brother, Hanhan, becomes friends with Gu. Gu learns the hardships of peasant life, especially that of Cui Qiao. The father prays to the sky for rain, since there is a long-running drought, but Gu Qing makes light of what he sees as superstitions. The girl, who is a gifted singer but doesn't show off her talent in front of the officer, is told at only age 14 that she must marry a significantly older man in only a few months' time, as her wedding dowry was used to pay for her mother's funeral and brother's engagement. She is even more miserable when Gu informs them that he must return to Yan'an. The next morning, Hanhan accompanies Gu as he leaves and they part ways. However, Cui Qiao is waiting for Gu along the way and she pleads to go along with him. Gu convinces her to go back as she cannot follow without his army's permission, but tells her he will come back for her. They part ways too, with the girl finally singing for him as he walks away. The wedding day comes and Cui Qiao is taken away in a bridal sedan. The bride's first night is shown to be a painful experience. At the same time, Gu has reached Yan'an and is now watching a drum-dance for new recruits fighting for the anti-Japanese war. Cui Qiao informs Hanhan that she wants to run away to join the army, and she tells him to take care of their father and give Gu some hand-sewn insoles whenever he comes back. At night, she tries to cross the turbulent Yellow River while singing a communist song taught by Gu Qing, against the advise of her brother who warns her of the danger. The next day, a sunken object wrapped by a red thread is shown in the water.

By the time Gu returns, as he once promised Cui Qiao, there is no one home, since all the peasants are praying and dancing for rain before a dragon god: the land has dried up and peoples' crops have died. Hanhan spots Gu and tries to go over to him, but a crowd of peasants obstructs his way. The film ends with the sound of Cui Qiao's song: "The piebald cock flies over the wall. The Communist Party shall save us all!"

== Cast ==
Xueqi Wang as Gu Qing: A young, hard-working soldier of the CPP Eighth Route Army. He travels to Shaanbei to collect folk songs, living with Cui Qiao and her family during this time. In Cui Qiao's home, he describes scenes of freedom and equality of the people of Yan'an, which deeply moves Cui Qiao.

Bai Xue as Cui Qiao: A lively, brave, young girl who was the greatest singer in her village. Her mother died when she was young, and she lived with her father and brother (Hanhan). She was touched by Gu Qing's description of female liberty, so she asked Gu Qing to take her away. After she received Gu Qing's rejection, she decided to run away alone.

Tuo Tan as The Father: A kind but ignorant elder. He is the father of Cui Qiao and Hanhan. He views Gu Qing as a part of his family, but does not respect Gu Qing's opinions on liberty. Despite love for his children, he adheres to village tradition and arranges his daughter marriage, despite her protest.

Liu Qiuang as Hanhan: Cui Qiao's brother. An innocent, kind, yet reckless young man who greatly loves his family

== Director and cinematographer ==
In 1978, Zhang Yimou and Chen Kaige entered the Beijing Film Academy at the same time, Chen Kaige applying to the directing department and Zhang Yimou to the cinematography department. After graduating in 1982, both were assigned to the Guangxi Film Studio, where Chen Kaige directed and Zhang Yimou worked as cinematographer. Yellow Earth was the first of two films on which the pair worked together as director and cinematographer; Zhang Yimou again photographed Chen Kaige's The Big Parade in 1986.

Yellow Earth is Chen Kaige's first film, who is an important figure in the Chinese fifth generation cinema history. Together with Zhang Yimou, who is also an icon in the fifth generation, they created a film that "changed the face of filmmaking in the country". The chemistry between Chen Kaige and Zhang Yimou is well presented in this film because it is marked as a signature work that initiated the fifth generation Chinese cinema. Fifth generation directors create distinctive works because they add political allegories into their films that make them different from conventional and social-realist filmmaking. Unlike other state products, "their films contain sophisticated reflections on the country's history, culture and its evolution".

== Historical background and cultural depiction ==
=== Background of the film production ===
The film was produced in 1984 when Chen Kaige was in the Shaanxi film industry. The film illustrated a strong poetic mood. Chen Kaige had said in an interview that he would not be able to make a film like Yellow Earth again. Specifically, he explains, the film is made when Chen Kaige can intimately get in contact with Shaanxi people's life in the particular time point. At the time the film was produced, new knowledge was rushing into the country, and women gained more freedom in the new society. Yet, the battle between the new and the old society is ongoing. The film portrays that people from the old time have already been accustomed to feudal ideologies. Even though they know there are new things coming out in the world, they think they are too poor to change anything. In other words, many people from the old feudal society in Shaanxi have already given up the search for hope and change. Change is luxurious and almost impossible to get under the poor and dry environment in Shaanxi. Cui Qiao is a transitional character between the old feudal society in Shaanxi and the new era of China.

=== Historical setting ===
Yellow Earth is set in the spring of 1939, two years into the Second Sino-Japanese War. At this time the Chinese Communist Party made Yan'an, in northern Shaanxi, its headquarters and the administrative centre of the Shaanxi-Gansu-Ningxia Border Region. From this base, the Party and its Eighth Route Army conducted the political, military, and cultural work that frames the film's action; as the historian W. K. Cheng notes, the survival of the Chinese nation was felt to be at stake.

Gu Qing's assignment—to gather peasant folk songs and rework them with revolutionary lyrics—dramatized an actual practice of the Yan'an period. The "transformation" of folk culture was central to the Party's effort to build a national culture that was modern and revolutionary, assimilating the popular, "democratic" elements of peasant tradition while discarding what it deemed feudal. Helen Hok-Sze Leung situates this within the Yan'an doctrine of the "mass line", under which intellectuals and cultural workers were expected to "descend" to the countryside to learn from the peasantry even as they sought to lead it—principles Mao Zedong would articulate more fully in his 1942 "Talks at the Yan'an Forum on Literature and Art".

The choice of Shaanbei (northern Shaanxi) as a setting is significant: the region was poor and drought-prone, but in Yan'an, the political class believed its extreme hardship was an asset. Folk songs, the peasants explain in the film, are remembered "when life is hard", and the Party held that backwardness and adversity, rather than obstructing revolution, had nurtured the "culture of the people". The film evokes this heritage in its opening, where archaic calligraphy recalls the border region as a cradle of early Chinese civilization.

=== Feudal customs in Shaanxi ===
Yellow Earth depicts customs that the film associates with an older "feudal" rural order, most prominently Cuiqiao's arranged marriage and a communal ceremony to pray for rain. At fourteen, Cuiqiao is betrothed against her will to a much older man because her family's estate, which was spent on her mother's funeral and her brother's bride-price, leaves nothing for a dowry. Esther Yau reads this as symbolic of the "feudalist victimization" of women in this society. The rain-prayer ritual reflects the precarious nature of agriculture in the drought-prone Shaanbei region of northern Shaanxi, where popular religion centres on the Dragon King (longwang), a deity believed to govern rainfall and the harvest. In his study of the Black Dragon King (Heilongdawang) temple, the anthropologist Adam Yuet Chau documents how central such Dragon King worship remains to communal religious life in the area.

=== Gender and narrative subjectivity ===
The film employs a symbolic gender contrast to describe the relationship between traditional rural society and revolutionary modern society. Gu Qing, the main male character represents the Communist revolutionary force which is aligned with "yang," means masculinity, movement, and political agency. In contrast, Cuiqiao is associated with "yin,", femininity, stillness. This symbolic mapping highlights the limited space available for female in the film's historical setting. While Cuiqiao uses folk songs to express her individual desires, also her longing to escape the oppressive arranged marriage, her trajectory remains tied to the Yellow Earth, which we could say is the yellow earth in the hometown itself or is a representative of the traditional oppression. The film is criticizing how traditional social structures, and early revolutionary fields often placed women in a position of "symbolic silence". At this status, their personal liberation still have to make concessions to border historical and cultural narratives.

== Production ==
=== Music ===
The music in Yellow Earth, composed by Zhao Jiping, reflects the regional characteristics of northern China and plays a role in defining character and atmosphere. Zhao created distinct theme pieces for the four main characters. Drawing from field research and local folk music traditions, the compositions were intended to match the personalities and social roles of the characters.

The use of folk songs in the film has also been discussed beyond its regional musical style. Mary Ann Farquhar argues that the storyline of Gu Qing travelling to the Shaanbei countryside to collect folk songs connects the film's music to a larger symbolic contrast between yang and yin: Gu Qing is associated with yang—masculinity, movement, and revolutionary action—while Cuiqiao, the yellow earth, and the Yellow River are associated with yin—femininity, stillness, and water. In Farquhar's reading, song is also Cuiqiao's chief means of expression, giving voice to the hardship and longing she cannot otherwise speak.

The film further sets the peasants' traditional folk songs against the revolutionary music the Party seeks to put in their place. Gu Qing's assignment is to collect folk tunes and rework them with communist lyrics, and W. K. Cheng reads the closing scenes—Cuiqiao singing a revolutionary anthem as she rows into the Yellow River, and the villagers' prayer for rain—as the Party's incorporation of the people's voice.

=== Cinematography ===
According to cinematographer Zhang Yimou, Yellow Earth features minimal camera movement and emphasizes static compositions, which he described as "almost like a 'dumb photo' shooting." The extensive use of long and static shots conveys a sense of "stillness", in alignment with the film's themes.

The scholar H. C. Li discusses the film's visual style in terms of landscape and distance, observing that Yellow Earth opens with panoramic views of Shaanbei terrain and relies on striking compositions, long shots, and crowd scenes to generate emotion and atmosphere. Chris Berry and Mary Ann Farquhar note that the film draws on a limited collection of images (earth, water, sky, mountains, trees, and boats), primarily in reference to classical Chinese landscape-painting traditions. This is set against Maoist iconography such as peasants, oxen, and soldiers.

=== Color ===
The film prominently features earthy yellow tones, evoking the northern Chinese landscape. Other key colors—black (cotton jackets), white (headscarves), and red (wedding garments)—are used symbolically. For example, red has been interpreted as referencing both traditional marriage customs and aspirations for personal freedom. Zhang Yimou has described color as a key narrative element and has been noted for his distinctive use of visual color symbolism.

== Adaptation ==
Yellow Earth was adapted from "Echoes in the Deep Valley" (深谷回声; Shēngǔ huíshēng), a reminiscence essay by Ke Lan that draws on his experience as a young cultural worker collecting folk songs in a mountain village near Yan'an, similar to Gu Qing's mission in the film. The film departs sharply from this source. In Ke Lan's essay, the plot centres on a romance with a peasant girl named Cuiqiao, who takes her own life to defy an arranged marriage. Chen Kaige removed most of the romantic content—what the historian W. K. Cheng calls "de-sexualizing" the original—in part by casting Gu Qing as a man in his thirties and Cuiqiao as a fourteen-year-old. The film changes Cuiqiao's fate; rather than depicting her suicide, it shows her attempting to cross the Yellow River at night towards Yan'an, and leaves the outcome unresolved, strongly implying she drowns. Helen Hok-Sze Leung notes that the film cuts from Cuiqiao's boat to empty landscapes, providing nothing to confirm if she survives and leaving her fate ambiguous.

== Influence ==
As a pioneering modernist work, the film inspired Fifth Generation filmmakers and international scholars. It was dubbed "experimental cinema" and sparked discussions at prestigious events like the Golden Rooster film awards regarding the audience for art films. Director Tian Zhuangzhuang stated it sparked debates about film aesthetics, representing "the future of Chinese cinema." Mary Farquhar observed its Daoist aesthetics differentiated it from communist-era productions, while Stephanie Donald argued the landscape "rewrites history" by reasserting China's meaning across revolutionary eras. Director Chen Kaige noted that the film aimed to explore China's national character and convey the poverty and slow pace of the land through its cinematography, dubbed an "ethnographic narrative" by scholar Timothy Kendall. Other films identified as "ethnographic narratives" that followed a similar path include Tian Zhuangzhuang's On the Hunting Ground (1985) and Horse Thief (1986), and Zhang Nuanxin's Sacrificed Youth (1985).

== Reception ==
=== Domestic reception ===
Initial reception within China was mixed to negative. Censors criticized the film's "indulgence with poverty and backwardness", and while the film avoided a complete ban, it was "under constant attack since its first screenings". Domestic critics described the film as "opaque and flat" due to its subversion of tropes common to Chinese melodrama at the time of release.

=== International reception ===
The film was one of the first Chinese art films to attract international attention, being more widely seen and more positively received outside China. Richard James Havis stated it "proved a sensation" and spotlighted the Fifth Generation movement, where during its premiere at the 1985 Hong Kong International Festival, it was touted as "an outstanding breakthrough" and won a total of four international festival prizes in 1985.
