= Human flesh search engine =

Chinese term for a form of Internet vigilantism

Human flesh search engine (Chinese: 人肉搜索; pinyin: Rénròu Sōusuǒ) is a Chinese term for the phenomenon of distributed researching using Internet media such as blogs and forums. Internet media, particularly dedicated websites and forums, serve as platforms for broadcasting requests and action plans related to human flesh search, as well as for sharing both online and offline search results.

Human flesh search engine is similar to the concept of "doxing". Both human flesh search and doxing are typically viewed as identifying and exposing individuals for public humiliation, sometimes out of vigilantism, nationalist or patriotic sentiments, or the desire to circumvent Internet censorship in the People's Republic of China. However, more recent analyses have shown that it is also used for other purposes, such as exposing government corruption, identifying hit and run drivers, and exposing scientific fraud, as well as for more "entertainment"-related items such as identifying people seen in pictures. A categorization of hundreds of human flesh search (HFS) episodes can be found in the 2010 IEEE Computer Magazine paper "A Study of the Human Flesh Search Engine: Crowd-Powered Expansion of Online Knowledge".

Due to the convenience and efficiency of information sharing in cyberspace, human flesh search is often used to acquire information that is typically difficult or impossible to find through traditional methods (such as libraries or search engines). Once this information is available, it can be rapidly distributed across hundreds of websites, making it an extremely powerful mass medium. The purposes of human flesh search vary from providing technical/professional Q&A support, to revealing private/classified information about specific individuals or organizations (therefore breaching the internet confidentiality and anonymity). Because personal knowledge or unofficial (sometimes illegal) access are frequently depended upon to acquire this information, the reliability and accuracy of such searches often vary.

== Etymology ==
The term originated on the Mop forums in 2001, coined by Mop to describe "a search that was human-powered rather than computer-driven". The original human flesh search engine was a subforum on Mop similar to a question-and-answer (Q&A) site, focusing on entertainment-related questions. Gradually, the definition of the term evolved from not just a search by humans, but also a search of humans.

== History ==
An early human flesh search dated back to March 2006, when netizens on Tianya Club collaborated to identify an Internet celebrity named "Poison" (simplified Chinese: 毒药; traditional Chinese: 毒藥; pinyin: dúyào). The man was found out to be a high-level government official.

However, Fei-Yue Wang et al. state that the earliest HFS search was in 2001, "when a user posted a photo of a young woman on a Chinese online forum..., and claimed she was his girlfriend." She was eventually identified as a minor celebrity and the initial claim was discredited.

Over the years, the human flesh search was repeatedly deployed, sometimes fueling moral crusades against socially unacceptable behaviors, such as political corruption, extramarital affairs, animal cruelties or perceived betrayal/hostilities towards the Chinese nation. Individuals on the receiving end often have their real-life identities or private information made public, and can be subjected to harassment such as hate mails/calls, death threats, graffiti and social humiliation. Organizations can be subjected to coordinated cyber-attacks.

The human flesh search engine has also been deployed for amusement. Johan Lagerkvist, author of After the Internet, Before Democracy: Competing Norms in Chinese Media and Society, said that the Little Fatty meme, in which pictures of a teenager were photoshopped on film posters without the boy's permission, demonstrated that the human flesh search engine "can also be directed against society's subaltern and the powerless" and that "[t]his raises important issues of the legitimate right to privacy, defamation, and slander."

The Baojia system of community rule-of-law in ancient China bears strong similarities with human flesh search. Both are based on some form of vigilantism.

== Stance of the authorities ==
In December 2008, the People's Court in Beijing called it an alarming phenomenon because of its implications in "cyberviolence" and violations of privacy law. Human flesh searches are banned under the law.

From March 1, 2020, the Cyberspace Administration of China's Provisions on the Governance of the Online Information Content Ecosystem has been implemented, clarifying that users and producers of online information content services and platforms must not engage in online violence, doxing, deep forgery, data fraud, account manipulation and other illegal activities.

== In film and television ==
- Caught in the Web is a 2012 film by Chen Kaige which explores fictional instances of use of the human flesh search engine.
- In the television series Mr. Robot, the mysterious group known as The Dark Army has elements based on the phenomenon.
- Season 20 episode 6 of Law and Order was titled "Human Flesh Search Engine".
- A web-based platform designed to pool the knowledge efforts of Internet sleuths is the premise of the CBS program Wisdom of the Crowd.
- Searching is a 2018 American thriller film about human flesh search.
- The Snow White Murder Case presents a tragedy of human flesh search.
- The 2009 Chinese film Invisible Killer is related to human flesh search.
- Human Flesh Search Engine is a Chinese documentary released on 18 July 2009.

== Notable examples ==
- South China Tiger photograph claims: In 2007, a man in Shaanxi Province, China, claimed to have encountered a live wild South China Tiger, which has long been considered extinct in natural environments. The photos he had taken were later published. The wide circulation of these photos triggered a wave of authentication among web users. who leveraged expertise in diverse domains ranging from zoology, botany, to photography and geometry. Finally, a participant successfully identified the origin of the images: a New Year's picture published by a small company in Zhejiang province, from which the hunter had used to forge the claimed South China Tiger pictures. Human flesh search ended up proving that the photos were fake.
- Zhang Ya's Earthquake Video: In May 2008, an earthquake with a magnitude of 8.0 swept through Sichuan, China, killing approximately 87,587 people. In response to the quake, a video insulting the victims was published on YouTube by an anonymous female user. After nationwide outrage, The Human Flesh Search Engine identified the girl as Zhang Ya, doxing her and uploading her personal information online.
- Li Gang incident: On October 16, 2010, a drunk-driving student hit a pair of university students while driving inside Hebei University, with one fatality, and was reported to have shouted “Sue me if you dare, my dad is Li Gang!” when apprehended. Following the spread of the news on Chinese internet forums, the driver's identity was revealed as Li Qiming, the son of the deputy director of the local public security bureau.
- Doxed driver in the west of China: On 21 March 2013, a driver in Ürümqi, China rolled down his window to spit on an elderly homeless person lying on the street. Witnesses recorded the first few digits of the license plate. A brief broadcast by a local radio quickly caused a stir on the Internet and the furious netizens doxxed Yin Feng, a part-time taxi driver in Ürümqi, within hours after the incident, resulting in harassing calls and blackmail.

== See also ==
- China brain
- Doxxing
- Hacktivism
- Internet vigilantism
- Mass collaboration
- Outing
- Streisand effect
- Wisdom of the crowd
- Natural language search engine
- Mother Horse Eyes
