= The Big Parade (1986 film) =

1986 film by Chen Kaige

- Film poster
- Directed by: Chen Kaige
- Written by: Gao Lili
- Starring: Wang Xueqi
- Cinematography: Zhang Yimou
- Edited by: Zhou Xinxia
- Music by: Zhao Jiping; Qu Xiaosong
- Production company: Guangxi Film Studio
- Release date: 1986
- Running time: 103 minutes
- Country: China
- Language: Mandarin

The Big Parade (simplified Chinese: 大阅兵; traditional Chinese: 大閱兵; pinyin: Dà Yuèbīng) is a 1986 Chinese drama film directed by Chen Kaige and with Zhang Yimou as cinematographer. It tells the story of a tough drill sergeant and his raw recruits.

Today, the film stands somewhat in the shadows to Chen Kaige's better-known works, including his directorial debut Yellow Earth and the Palme d'Or winning Farewell, My Concubine.

== Contents ==
The film was commissioned to commemorate the 1984 National Day parade. It was the second collaboration between Chen Kaige (director), Zhang Yimou (cinematographer), and He Qun (art director).

The film follows a group of soldiers through the difficult training required for participation in the National Day parade for the 35th anniversary of the founding of the People's Republic of China. The soldiers, who have a high degree of visual cohesion, are differentiated over the course of the film through characterization as they address their individual challenges and the challenging training regimen.

The Big Parade is often seen as an exploration of the relationship of collectivism versus individualism. At the time, however, some western critics, including the New York Times, took the film at face value, seeing it as propagandist and describing it as a "boot camp" film. The New York Times, in particular, derided the film as a "Recruiting Poster for Collective Action." If critics felt that this was merely China's newest propaganda film, this was due in part to the heavy hand of the Chinese Film Bureau. Originally, Chen had not shot an actual parade to conclude his film, only obscure silhouettes of soldiers against a sunset, an artistic decision that shocked "both army and censors." Even forcing the director to insert more traditional imagery, censors nevertheless withdrew the film from the 1987 Cannes Film Festival without explanation.

Despite its apparent support of collectivism, some scholars have noted a more ambiguous subtext to the film, suggesting that the film's imagery is less simplistic than such early reviews suggested. As one scholar writes, Chen explores the relationship between the collective and the individual, but wants to leave the relationship ambiguous. Another Chinese film scholar, Zhang Yingjin, also sees a subtext of criticism of the Chinese notion of its own nationhood, even as the film's rhetoric veers towards the propagandist.

== Cinematography ==
Zhang Yimou's cinematography in the film is widely praised. The New York Times wrote upon the film's American screening in 1988 that it was "[Zhang's] photography that lifts The Big Parade out of the rudely fashioned trench of its story." Academic Andy Rodekhor writes that Zhang's cinematography "deconstructs both the crowd as a mass unit and the ritual of its formation". Zhang became a major film director himself, directing his debut, Red Sorghum, in 1987.
