= Huge =

Huge may refer to:

- Huge (album), by Hugh Hopper and Kramer, 1997
- Huge (digital agency)
- Huge (film), a 2010 film directed by Ben Miller
- Huge (magazine), a style magazine published by Kodansha in Japan
- Huge (TV series), a television series on ABC Family
- Huge cardinal, a number in mathematics
- Huge, an album by Caroline's Spine
- Huge: A Novel, by Brent Butt, 2023
- Human genome equivalent, a genomic sequence length used in DNA sequencing
- King Huge, a character in the Adventure Time

== See also ==
- Hu Ge (disambiguation)
