= Hu Ge (director) =

Hu Ge (Chinese: 胡戈; pinyin: Hú Gē; born 1974) is an amateur director in the People's Republic of China who rose to fame through social satire and the Internet. His works, which are videos which can be downloaded from video-sharing sites such as YouTube, and freely distributed by his permission, are viewed by millions. His outrageous humour and his use of innumerable parodies had gained a degree of international attention and drew notices from the Communist Party's Department of Propaganda. He has since directed a number of hugely popular online commercials for companies such as 7Up and McDonald's.

== Biography ==
Hu Ge grew up in Wuhan, Hubei Province, China.

Hu Ge became well known by Chinese netizens after his first short movie, A Murder Case Caused by a Bun (a spoof on Chen Kaige's The Promise), in late 2005. His subsequent works have also been well received.

== Techniques ==
Hu Ge focuses on enhancements through satire in social and cultural realms, reflecting numerous problems in Chinese society to a backdrop of loosely pieced together current events or well-known footage from big-name films, including Harry Potter, The Matrix, Shaolin Soccer, Hero, etc. He has immense focus on elements of parody on multiple levels. The music he uses are usually satirical, be it Chinese instrumentals, Hollywood movie soundtracks, American pop songs or spinoffs of Michael Jackson songs.

== Public and official response ==
Hu Ge's films, which are distributed freely on the Internet, received widespread attention on Chinese video-sharing networks, beating Huang Jianxiang's crazy commentary at the World Cup in Germany (because of the large number of networks the statistics are inconclusive). In January 2006, after the popularizing of Hu's first creation, A Murder Case caused by a Mantou, Chen Kaige, director of The Promise and subject of Hu's satire, announced plans to take legal action against Hu for apparent copyright violations and defamation. The amateur films became the discussion topics on various Chinese forums, and received overwhelming support from the general public, which led to bad social repercussion against Chen, who later dropped the lawsuit. In late 2006, because of its subtle social commentary that could be interpreted at a political level, Hu's films gained the attention to the Communist Party's Propaganda Department, in charge of China's media controls. There were talks of a ban in late 2006, with the pretext that Hu's films are too long and too intricate in design, that they can no longer be categorized as amateur Internet videos. In early 2007, however, after Hu's newest release, 007 vs. Man in Black, there are no signs of a ban.

== Filmography ==
- A Murder Case Caused by Mantou (一个馒头引发的血案), 2005 (parodies a Chinese legal talk show and the film The Promise, satirizes Chinese cinema)
- The Empire of Spring Transportation (春运帝国), 2006 (parodies The Matrix trilogy, Stephen Chow movies and Hero, satirizes China's chaotic Chunyun period)
- The Legend of Suppressing Mt. Birdcage Bandits (鸟笼山剿匪记), 2006 (live action, the name parodies a popular 1980s Chinese TV series, satirizes Saddam Hussein's corrupt regime and George W. Bush's private gain from the War on Iraq)
- Mt. Birdcage TV Shopping (鸟笼山电视直销), 2006 (parodies numerous Chinese and Hollywood films, satirizes the often overexaggerating Chinese infomercials)
- A City Full of Overtime Employees (满城尽是加班族), 2006 (live action, the title is a parody of the Zhang Yimou film Curse of the Golden Flower, parodies Hong Kong films, alludes to Jin Yong's wuxia novels, satirizes capitalism, first film employing dark humour)
- 007 vs. Man in Black (007大战黑衣人), 2007 (live action, satirizes North Korean leader Kim Jung-Il's regime and George W. Bush, first film containing fully legible English/Chinglish throughout, spoken or subtitled, the film also features an opening crawl similar to Star Wars and a parody of Michael Jackson's Beat It)
- 007 vs. Prince Pork (007大战猪肉王子), 2008 (live action, satirizes Chinese game shows and a number of social issues, including the infamous "South China Tiger photo incident", also parodies Taliban and Al-Qaeda, and features a scene of lightsabre dual resembling Star Wars: Episode I – The Phantom Menace)
- XX District, Unit No XX Apartment News (××小区××号群租房整点新闻), 2008~2009 (2-part live action, parodies CCTV news programs)
- Animal World: The Cyber-Animals (动物世界—宅居动物), 2010 (live action, parodies a popular Chinese nature documentary, satirizes internet culture and Chinese web censorship)

=== Advertisements ===
- Shoe Assault: The President's Counterattack (鞋袭——总统的反击), 2009 (live action, advertising for Alibaba.com, parodies Muntadhar al-Zaidi shoe-throwing incident)
