= Mudik =

Temporary internal migration in Indonesia to celebrate holidays

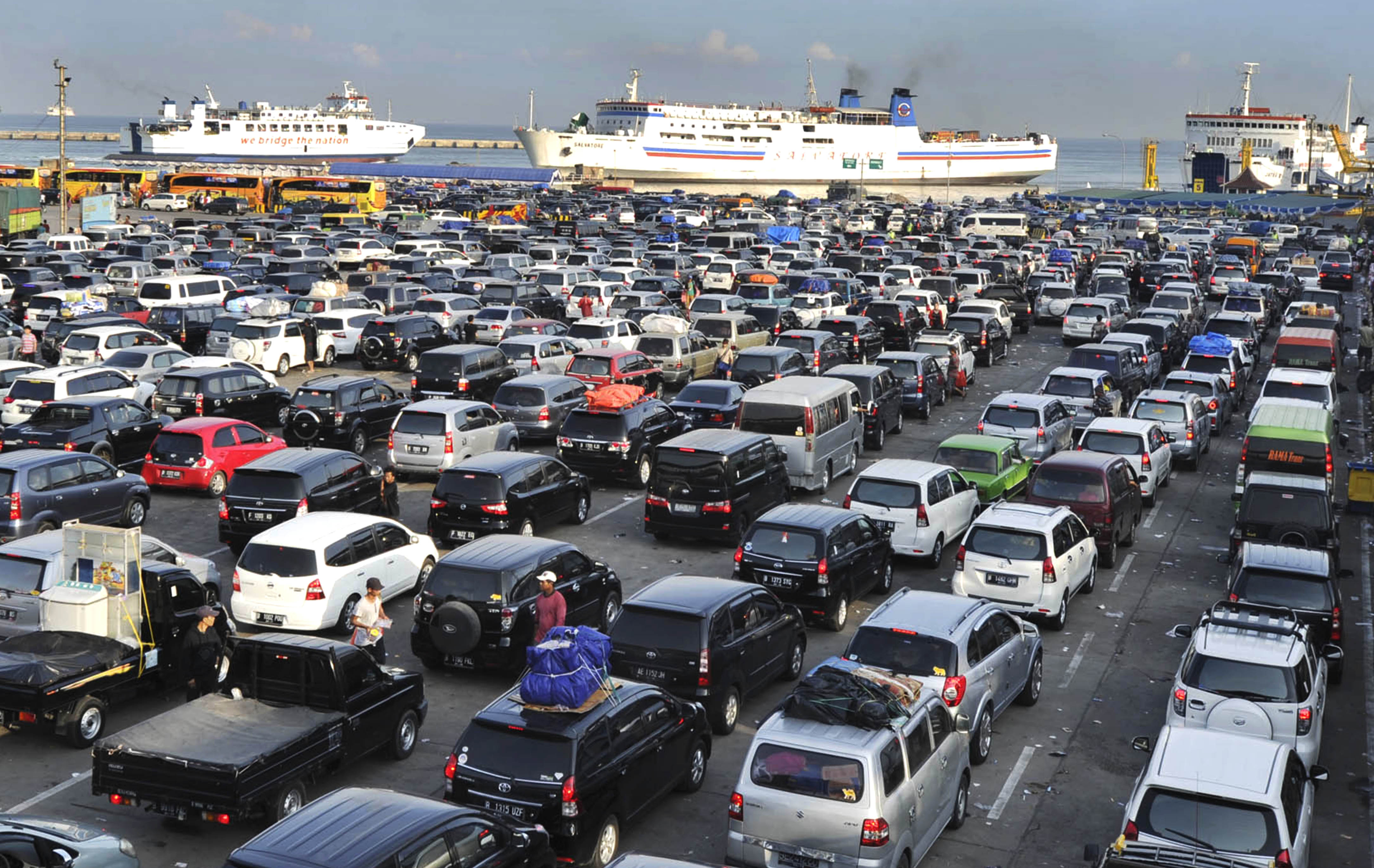
Hundreds of cars and buses queueing at Port of Merak, Banten with destination to the Port of Bakauheni in Lampung as mudik (homecoming) season began in before Eid, 2014.

Mudik (sometimes also known as pulang kampung) is an Indonesian phenomenon where migrants or migrant workers all across Indonesia return to their hometown or village during or before major holidays, especially Lebaran (Eid al-Fitr). Although the mudik homecoming travel before Lebaran takes place in most Indonesian urban centers, the highlight is on the nation's largest urban agglomeration; Greater Jakarta, as millions of Jakartans exit the city by various means of transportation, overwhelming train stations and airports and also clogging highways, especially the Trans-Java toll road and Java's Northern Coast Road.

The primary motivation of this homecoming tradition is to visit one's family, especially parents. However, people might seek to come to their hometown during this period to attend a rare opportunity: a gathering of members of the extended family, the seldom seen relatives that are normally scattered in other cities, other provinces or even overseas. The term mudik is also used by Indonesians living abroad to refer to their activity returning to Indonesia during the holiday season in whichever country of residence.

Mudik for Eid al-Fitr, or its similar traditions, exists in countries with Muslim majorities, such as Indonesia, Malaysia, and Pakistan. Other similar annual homecoming traditions are also observable in various parts of the world, including Chinese New Year in China and among the Chinese diaspora, Thai Songkran, Christmas in Europe and Latin America, Easter in Russia, Divali in India and Thanksgiving in America, where family members are expected to come home during these specific holidays.

== Etymology ==
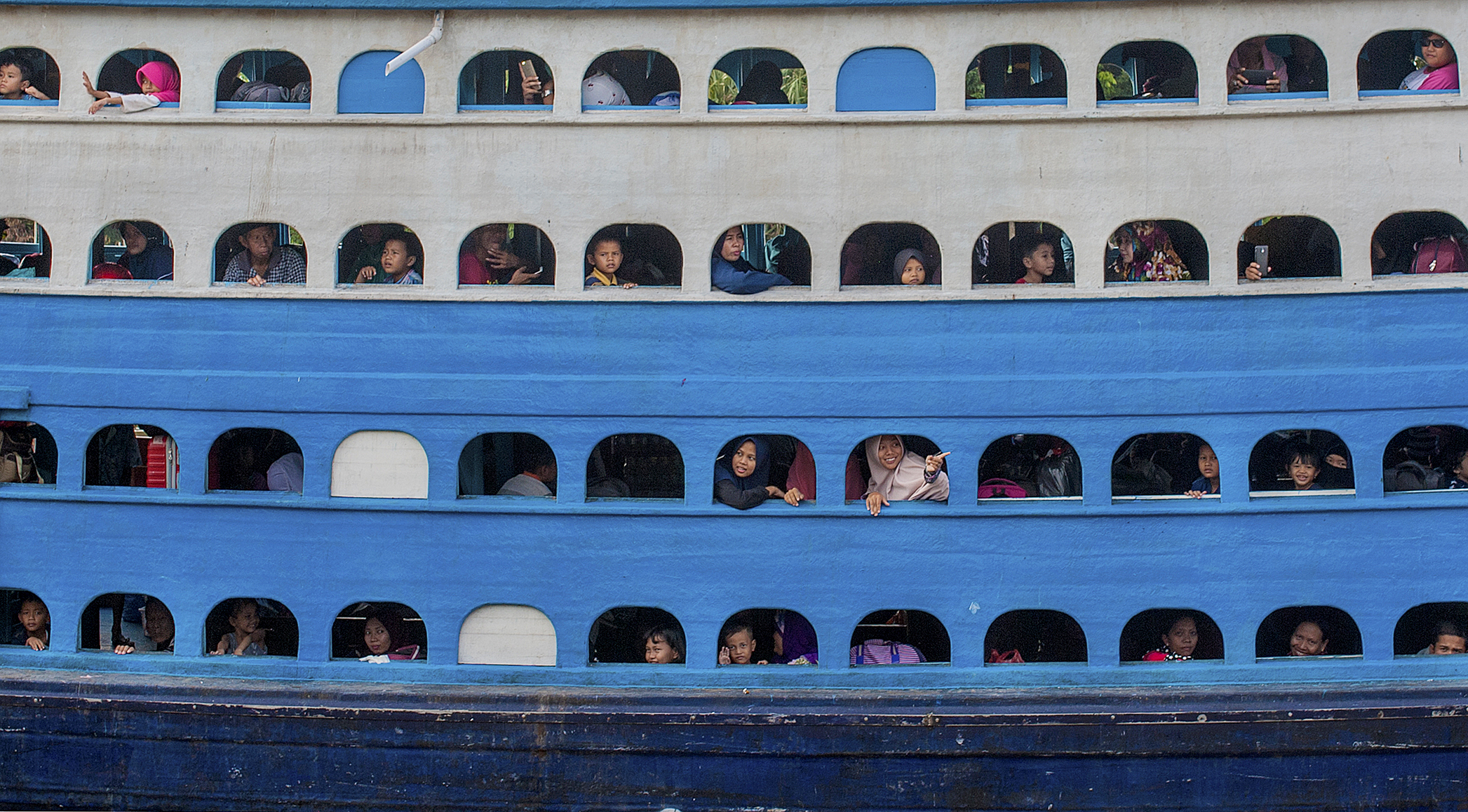
Mudik by the river aboard Jelatik ship in Riau.

The term mudik in Indonesian means "to sail or to travel upstream (udik) by the river". The term mudik or udik is also found in local related languages, such as Minang, Betawi, Sundanese, and Javanese.

Pulang kampung, meanwhile, simply means "returning home" (a connotation of kampung, which literally means village).

== History ==
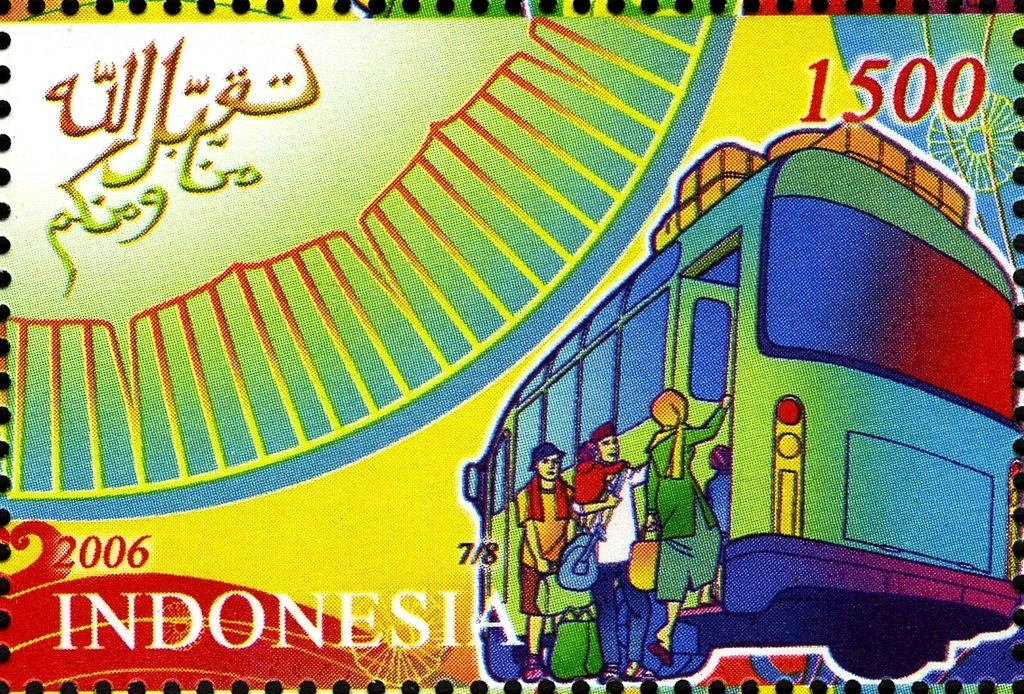
Depiction of mudik by bus on Indonesian stamp

The tradition of visiting one's hometown, home village, or family ancestral home is not a new tradition in Indonesian history. Manuscripts dated from the Majapahit period describe that nobles and royals often returned from the capital city in Trowulan to their ancestral home to honor and appease ancestral spirits. In Balinese tradition, Hindu Balinese people came home to their hometowns or their home villages during Galungan and Kuningan sacred days, as they believed it marks the time when the ancestral spirits visit their descendants in the mortal world.

In most parts of Indonesia where Islam is the majority, the homecoming or mudik tradition is most often conducted in the month of Ramadhan, between a week to several days before Lebaran (Eid al-Fitr). Nevertheless, other ethnicities such as the Madurese are known to conduct their mudik tradition before Eid al-Adha instead. Indonesian Christians, on the other hand, especially Batak people, might travel to their hometown prior to Christmas.

The term mudik to coin the specific homecoming activity has started to enter common Indonesians' vocabulary since the 1970s. It is suggested that in 1970s, during the start of Suharto's centralized New Order regime, the prominence of Jakarta as the center of the nation's politics, administrative and economic activities prompted massive urbanization, where the population of rural Javanese villages flocked and migrated to Jakarta and surrounding areas (Greater Jakarta) seeking jobs and economic opportunities. The majority of the migrants came from rural Javanese areas; nevertheless, Jakarta also attracted migrants from all over Indonesia. These newcomer migrants, who still nurture their links to their hometowns in rural Java or other corners in Indonesia, were actively involved in the annual mudik travel.

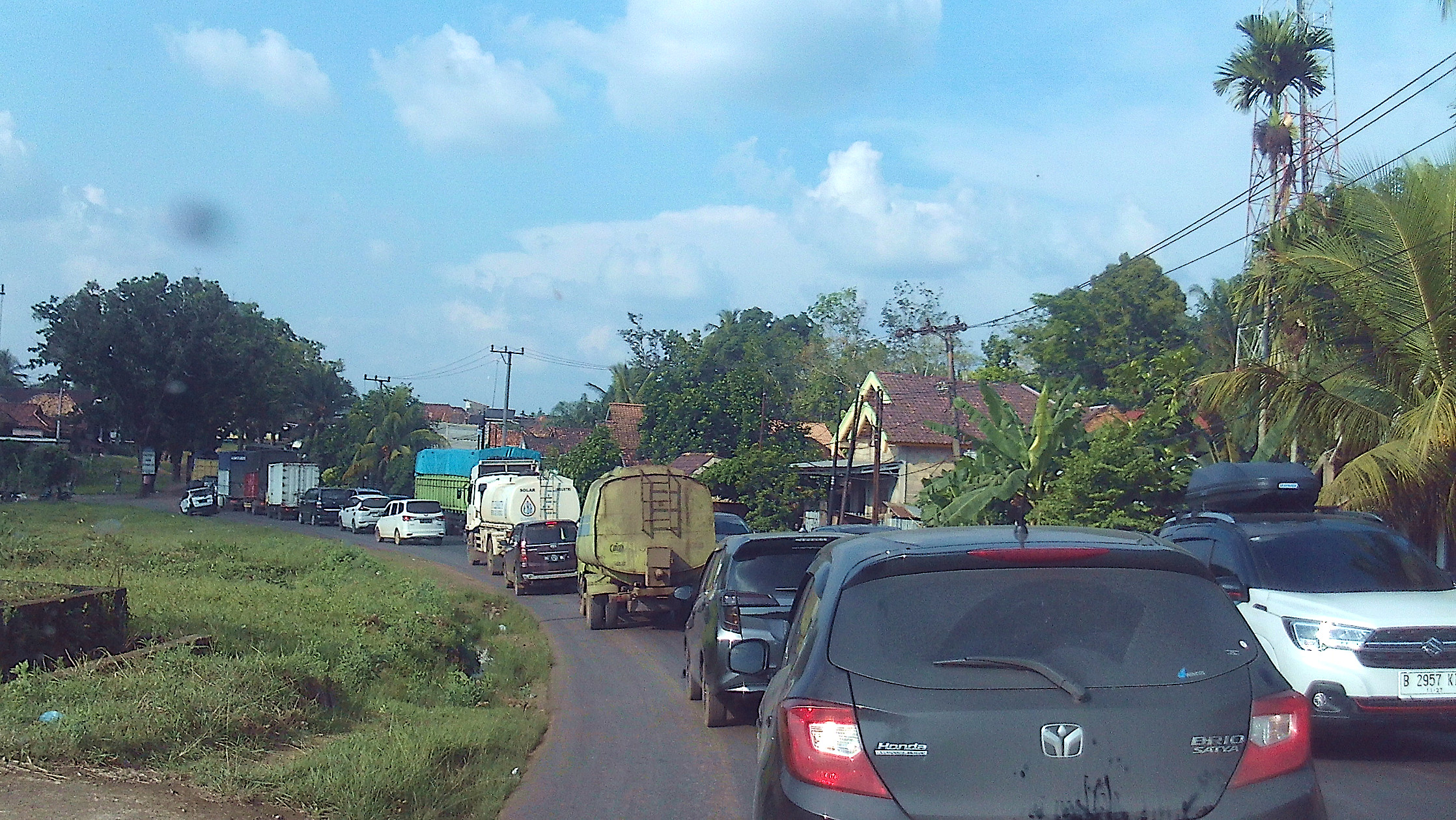
Traffic jam on Sumatran East Highway at Banyuasin section during mudik travel

Outside of Java, Mudik homecoming is also significantly observable in Sumatra, especially in West Sumatra, Riau, Jambi, South Sumatra corridors, where numbers of migrant workers, especially Minang perantauan (migrant) return to their hometown to celebrate Idul Fitri. Currently, the government is constructing the Trans-Sumatra Toll Road to ease the traffic on inter-province Sumatran main roads that are congested, especially during mudik travel.

To prevent the spread of COVID-19, the Indonesian government discouraged people from performing the mudik journey in April and May 2020 as well as in May 2021.

== Scale ==
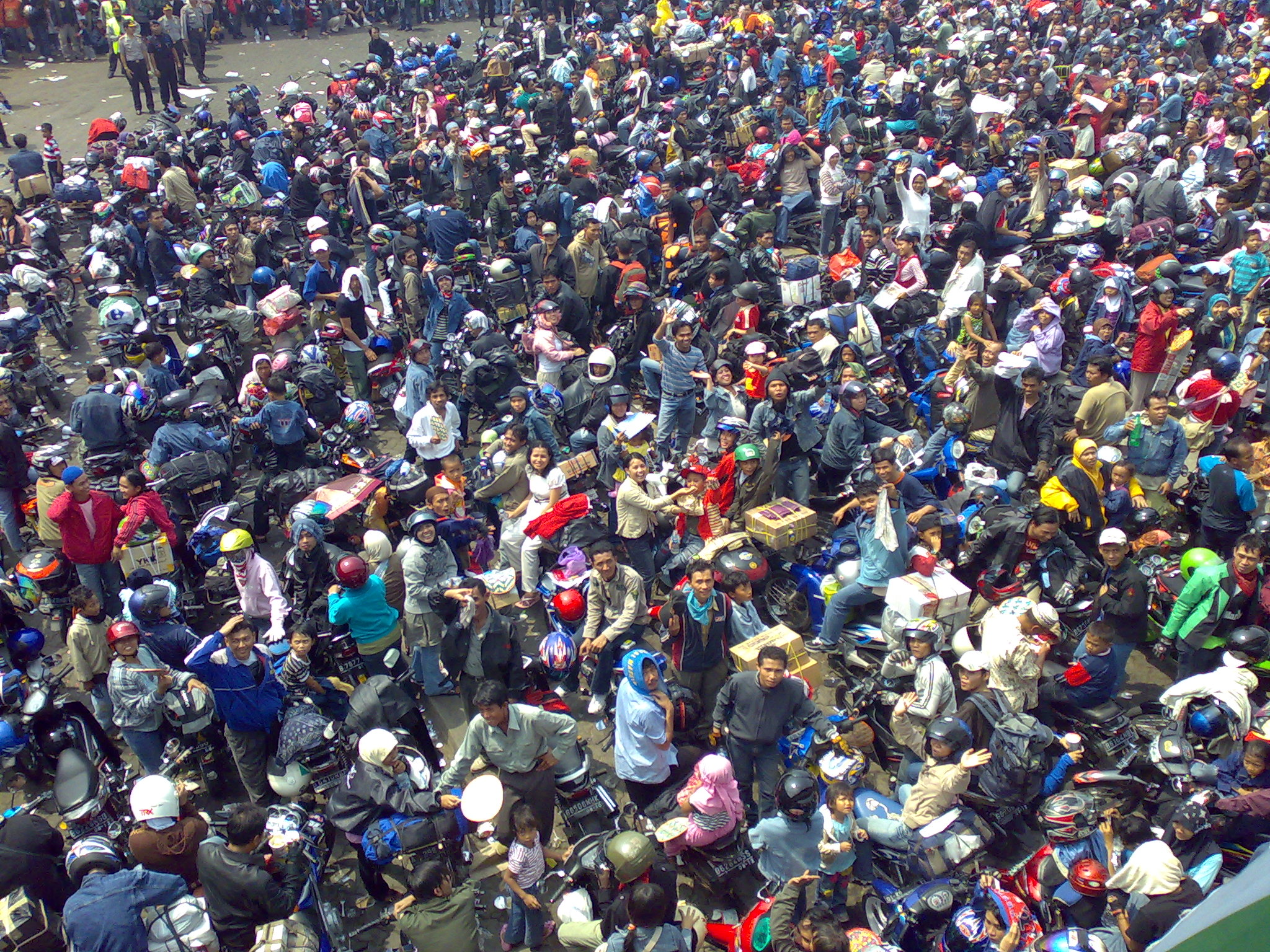
Large numbers of motorcyclists waiting to board the ferry at Merak port during mudik travel in 2007

As there are large numbers of travelers who perform mudik, the government of Indonesia provides additional transportation to handle the resulting massive travel surge in several days before and after the Lebaran. In 2013, around 30 million people traveled to their hometowns during Lebaran. They spent a total sum of around 90 trillion rupiah (around US$9 billion) in rural areas. In 2017, it was estimated that the people that took annual mudik travel reached 33 million people and later increased to 80 million people in 2022, and predicted to reach more than 120 million people in 2023. This causes massive traffic jams and a sudden rise of demand and volume of intercity transportation.

According to Indonesian National Police Brigadier General Trunoyudo Wisnu Andiko, the 2024 Mudik season has reached a record of 193 million people who have participated in this exodus cycle.

== Impacts ==
=== Transportation ===
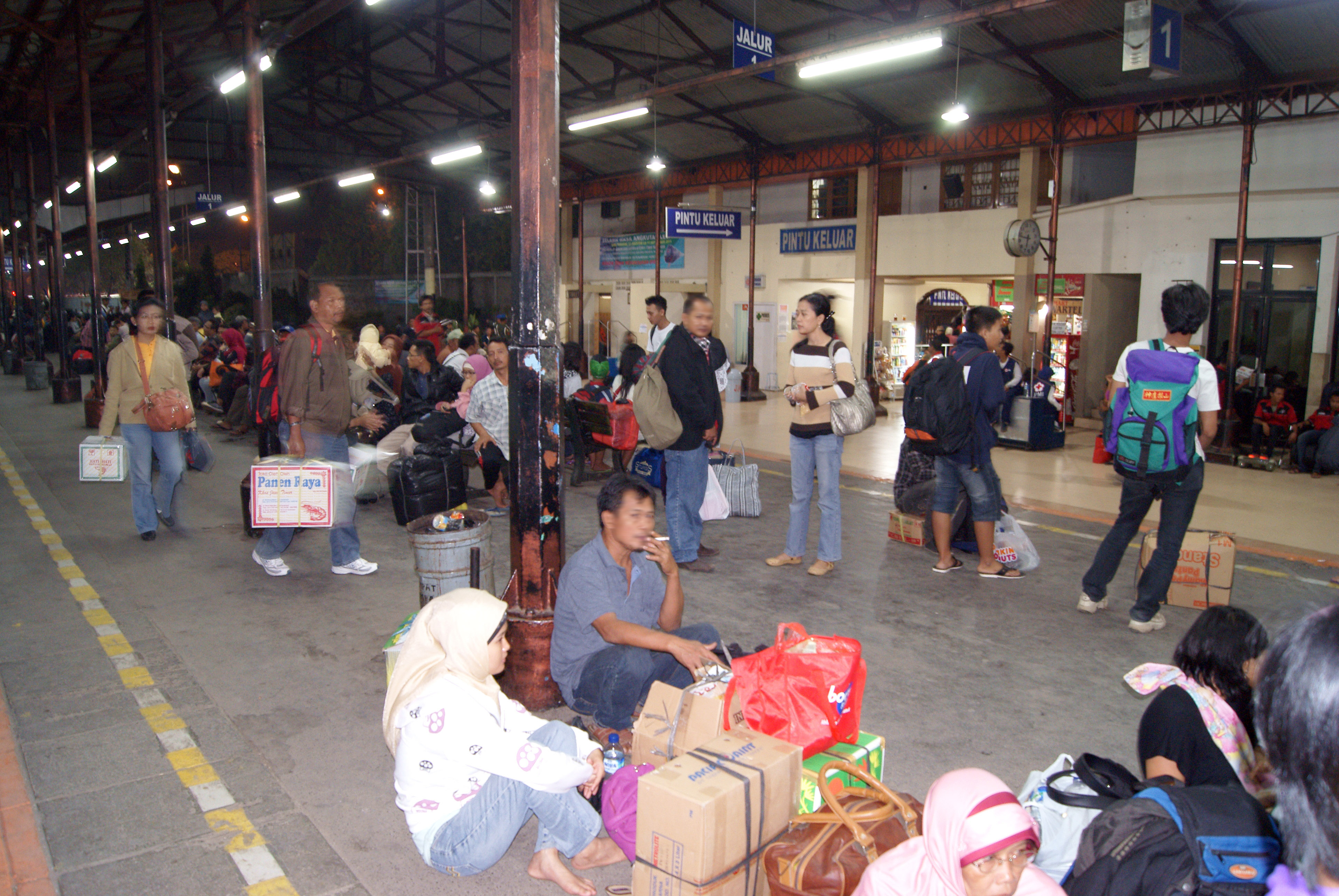
Train passenger waiting for their train in Jatinegara Station during Mudik travel.

The demand for train and airplane tickets usually spikes a month or two before Lebaran, prompting an unusually higher cost for tickets for highly sought days of departure. Some airlines might add extra flights or operate larger airplanes to deal with the surge in demand. Indonesian train operator Kereta Api Indonesia usually offers additional train trips or introduces longer trains with more cars in order to meet the demand. The private operators of intercity and inter-province buses usually charge higher ticket costs during this period.

The heaviest burdens faced during mudik are congestion and travel delays on public transport or the existing road network.

The impact is indeed tremendous as millions of buses, cars and motorcycles jam the roads and highways, causing kilometer-long traffic jams each year. The massive congestion usually occurs along Trans-Java toll road and Java's Northern Coast Road.

The Java's Northern Coast Road is usually heavily clogged during the annual Mudik travel.

Various modes of transportation, such as motorcycles are used by mudik travelers to reach their hometowns. Although it might be done for short ranges of travel, the police and authorities have discouraged this practice, citing the motorcycle's potential danger and unsuitability for mid- to long-range mudik travel. Large numbers of mudik accidents involve motorcyclists. Thus, to reduce the usage of motorcycles, the government tried to lure motorcyclists away from mudik travel by offering mudik gratis, or free mudik program. The program offers motorcyclists a free service to send their motorcycles via railways, trucks or ships to their towns separately while they travel with another mode of transportation instead. Despite initial success in reducing mudik motorcyclists in 2014 and 2015, the number of mudik motorcyclists spiked in 2016 to 5.6 million motorcycles.

=== Business ===
The sudden exodus of large numbers of migrant workers — most of them unskilled labor such as domestic helpers, and those who work in service sectors — has created a void in Jakarta and other major cities' daily activities, as numbers of business, services, establishments, warung and restaurants are closed for Lebaran. The sudden loss of occupants after Mudik is also observable on relatively empty Jakarta streets during Lebaran, which normally suffers from clogged traffic.

The Indonesian Ministry of Transportation estimated, the Mudik cycle each year has given huge economic impact, as in 2022 alone, the activities for the mass exodus in Indonesia during Ied day has generate roughly 157,3 trillion Rupiah.

== See also ==
- Balik kampung in Malaysia
- Chunyun in China
