= Country Teachers =

1993 film

- Film poster

Chinese name
- Traditional Chinese: 鳳凰琴
- Simplified Chinese: 凤凰琴
- Literal meaning: fenghuang qin (phoenix zither)
Transcriptions
Standard Mandarin
- Hanyu Pinyin: fènghuáng qín
Yue: Cantonese
- Jyutping: fung6 wong4 kam4
- Directed by: He Qun
- Written by: Bu Yangui; Ju Sheng; Liu Xinglong
- Starring: Li Baotian
- Cinematography: Meng Weibing
- Production companies: Tianjin Film Studio; Xiaoxiang Film Studio
- Release date: 1993
- Running time: 90 minutes
- Country: China
- Language: Mandarin

Country Teachers (Chinese: 凤凰琴) is a 1993 Chinese drama film directed by He Qun. The film was selected as the Chinese entry for the Best Foreign Language Film at the 66th Academy Awards, but was not accepted as a nominee.

== Cast ==
- Li Baotian as Principal Yu
- Ju Xue as Zhang Yingzi
- Wang Xueqi as Sun Shihai
- Xiu Zongdi as Uncle
- Sun Qian as Deng Youmei
- Ding Jiali as Deng's Wife

== See also ==
- List of submissions to the 66th Academy Awards for Best Foreign Language Film
- List of Chinese submissions for the Academy Award for Best Foreign Language Film
