= Huge (magazine) =

Japanese style magazine

HuGE is a high-end style magazine published by Kodansha in Japan. The magazine was established in 2004 and targets young men. It is published on a monthly basis. The headquarters is in Tokyo.
