= The Promise (2005 film) =

2005 Chinese film by Chen Kaige

- Theatrical release poster
- 无极
- Directed by: Chen Kaige
- Written by: Chen Kaige; Charcoal Tan
- Produced by: Chen Kaige; Jiang Tao; Chen Rao
- Starring: Jang Dong-gun; Hiroyuki Sanada; Cecilia Cheung; Nicholas Tse; Liu Ye; Chen Hong
- Cinematography: Peter Pau; Choi Shung-fai
- Edited by: Li Fang; Zhou Ying
- Music by: Klaus Badelt
- Production companies: China Film Group Corporation; Beijing Film; Beijing 21st Century Shengkai; Capgen Investment Group; Moonstone Entertainment
- Distributed by: China Film Group Corporation
- Release date: 15 December 2005
- Running time: 128 minutes
- Country: China
- Language: Mandarin
- Budget: US$35 million
- Box office: US$31 million

The Promise (无极) is a 2005 Chinese epic fantasy film directed by Chen Kaige, starring Jang Dong-gun, Hiroyuki Sanada, Cecilia Cheung, and Nicholas Tse. It is loosely adapted from The Kunlun Slave, a ninth-century wuxia romance story by Pei Xing. Responses to the film were mainly mixed to negative.

== Synopsis ==
Qingcheng, a starving girl, wanders the land in search of food. She tricks a boy, steals a mantou from him, and runs away. Afterwards, she meets the goddess Manshen and accepts an offer to enjoy a luxurious life and become the most beautiful woman in the land. However, in return, she will never find genuine, everlasting love with any man. She becomes the King's concubine when she grows up.

General Guangming defeats a barbarian army with only 3,000 soldiers and rushes back to save the King, who is besieged in the palace by the traitorous Duke Wuhuan. He meets Manshen, who tells him someone wearing his crimson armour will commit regicide and tarnish his reputation. A while later, Guangming is caught off guard and injured by Snow Wolf, Wuhuan's henchman, but is saved by his slave, Kunlun. He orders Kunlun to wear his armour and save the King. When Kunlun asks his master how he can identify the King, Guangming tells him the King is the one without a weapon. Kunlun arrives at the palace and mistakes Qingcheng for the King because she is unarmed, and instead kills the King, who has just drawn his sword. He flees with Qingcheng, but they end up being cornered at a cliff by Wuhuan and his men. Wuhuan promises not to harm Qingcheng if Kunlun jumps off the cliff.

Kunlun jumps but survives the fall. In the meantime, Guangming's subordinates accuse their general of killing the King and turn against him. Kunlun returns, saves his master and gives him back his armour. They go to rescue Qingcheng from Wuhuan later. Qingcheng falls in love with Guangming after mistaking him for the person who jumped off the cliff. On the other hand, Kunlun is captured by Wuhuan, who realises he is actually the one who killed the King. While Guangming and Qingcheng lead a happy life in the countryside, Kunlun uses his speed power to see the Veil of Time and learns that Wuhuan is responsible for the destruction of his family and homeland. Snow Wolf is from the same homeland as Kunlun but has been forced to serve Wuhuan. After allying with Kunlun to fight Wuhuan, Snow Wolf is ultimately forced to remove his immortality robe and accept his death.

Wuhuan lures Guangming back to the palace and captures him. He then places Guangming, Kunlun, and Qingcheng on a show trial for regicide. During the trial, Kunlun confesses that he killed the King, and Qingcheng realises he is actually the one who saved her earlier. Guangming, Kunlun, and Qingcheng are sentenced to death but they break free and fight Wuhuan, who tells Qingcheng he is the boy she stole a mantou from. As a result of Qingcheng betraying his trust, Wuhuan grew up in hatred and became the evil person he is today. Both Wuhuan and Guangming die in the fight while Kunlun is severely wounded. Kunlun survives after wearing Snow Wolf's immortality robe.

Manshen appears when Kunlun and Qingcheng are attempting to pass through the Veil of Time, and tells Qingcheng that the promises made between deities and humans are as fragile as ordinary promises. Qingcheng has finally found her true love and thus given herself an opportunity to choose again. Manshen advises her to choose wisely.

== Cast ==
- Jang Dong-gun as Kunlun
- Hiroyuki Sanada as General Guangming
- Cecilia Cheung as Qingcheng
  - Guan Xiaotong as Qingcheng (child)
- Nicholas Tse as Duke Wuhuan
  - Shi Lei as Duke Wuhuan (child)
- Liu Ye as Snow Wolf
- Chen Hong as Manshen

== Production ==
The budget for The Promise was estimated to be about 282–340 million yuan (US$35–42 million), which surpassed the cost of Zhang Yimou's Hero (2002). Principal photography took around six months.

== Release ==
The Promise was first released on 15 December 2005 in mainland China, Hong Kong, and Singapore.

In North America, The Promise was originally scheduled to be released in December 2005 by The Weinstein Company (TWC) under the title Master of the Crimson Armor. TWC also removed approximately 25 minutes of footage from the original cut. However, TWC eventually cancelled the release and sold the film's distribution rights to Warner Independent Pictures (WIP). WIP retained the changes made by TWC, but reverted the film's title back to The Promise and released it on 5 May 2006 in 213 theatres.

== Reception ==
=== Critical reception ===
The Promise received mixed reactions when it was first released in Asian countries. In China, most of the responses were mainly negative even though it grossed about US$9 million in the first week.

On the review aggregator website Rotten Tomatoes, 30% of 77 critics' reviews are positive. The website's consensus reads: "An incoherent plot and ridiculously obvious CGI effects doom this effort from the usually outstanding Chinese director Chen Kaige." Metacritic, which uses a weighted average, assigned the film a score of 53 out of 100, based on 26 critics, indicating "mixed or average" reviews.

Despite the negative reception, The Promise was one of two Chinese films in 2006 to be nominated for Golden Globes Best Foreign Language Film at the 63rd Golden Globe Awards.

=== Box office ===
The Promise grossed an estimated US$18 million in mainland China. It did not fare as well in Hong Kong, where it grossed only US$654,435 (HK$5,073,311). It grossed US$272,838 in its opening weekend in North America and collected US$669,625 by the end of its run. The Promise grossed a total of US$33,539,654 worldwide.

== Controversies ==
The film was criticised for the environmental damage it caused while it was shooting in Yunnan. The film's production crew were accused of damaging the vegetation and natural scenery of the area and the surrounding Bigu Lake, and for leaving behind a large amount of undisposed household waste.

Hu Ge's 2005 short film A Murder Case Caused by a Dumpling spoofed The Promise. After it was released on the internet, Chen Kaige threatened legal action for copyright infringement, but the case fizzled out due to widespread support for Hu from Chinese citizens.
