= Ge =

Ge or GE may refer to:

== Businesses ==
- General Electric, former multinational American technology and services conglomerate
- GE Appliances, a home appliance brand of Haier
- GE Aerospace, a multinational American aircraft engine manufacturer
- GE HealthCare, a multinational American medical technology company
- GE Vernova, a multinational American energy technology company
- 30 Rockefeller Center, a 1933 Art Deco skyscraper in Midtown Manhattan formerly known as the GE Building
- TransAsia Airways (IATA: GE), an airline based in Taipei, Taiwan

== Language ==
- Ge (Cyrillic) (Г, г), a letter of the Cyrillic alphabet
- Ghe with upturn (Ґ, ґ), a letter of the Ukrainian alphabet
- ġē, a plural Old English pronoun
- Gê languages, spoken by the Gê, a group of indigenous people in Brazil
- Gejia language, spoken in China
- げ or ゲ (ge), a Japanese syllabic character

== People ==
- Aleksandr Ge (1879–1919), Russian anarchist
- Augustus Ge, American professional pickleball player
- Ksenia Ge (1892–1919), Russian communist revolutionary
- Misha Ge, Uzbekistani former competitive figure skater
- Nikolai Ge (1831–1894), Russian painter
- Ge Cuilin (1930–2022), Chinese children's author
- Ge Xiaoguang (born 1953), Chinese artist
- Ge You (born 1957), Chinese film actor

== Places ==
- Canton of Geneva, a western canton of Switzerland
- Equatorial Guinea, abbreviation in French, Portuguese and Spanish
- Georgia (country), ISO 3166-2 country code
  - .ge, the Internet country code top-level domain (ccTLD) for Georgia
- Germany, obsolete NATO country code
- Gilbert and Ellice Islands, former ISO country code
- Province of Genoa, ISO 3166-2:IT code, a province of Italy
- German Empire 1871–1918

== Science and technology ==
=== Biology and medicine ===
- Ge (butterfly), a genus of butterflies in the grass skipper family
- Ganglionic eminence, a transitory structure in the developing brain
- Gastroenteritis, a condition that causes irritation and inflammation of the gastrointestinal tract
- Genetic engineering, the direct manipulation of an organism's genes
- Gender euphoria

=== Computing ===
- Gate equivalent, a manufacturing-technology-independent complexity measure in integrated circuit design (electronics)
- Gigabit Ethernet, a networking technology
- Google Earth, computer software to view satellite images of Earth
- Grid Engine, a batch-queuing system for computer clusters

=== Other uses in science and technology ===
- Germanium, symbol Ge, a chemical element
- Giant elliptical galaxy, a specific type of elliptical galaxy
- GE an old scale for measuring film speed
- "Greater than or equal to" (≥), an inequality operator

== Media ==
- GE – Good Ending, a manga by Kei Sasuga
- Granado Espada, a massively multiplayer online game from Korea
- God Eater, video game series published by Bandai Namco

== Other uses ==
- Gaia or Gê, a Greek goddess personifying the Earth
- Gē, an ancient Chinese dagger-axe
- Gě, a volume unit
- Gê peoples, indigenous peoples in Brazil
- A short-form for general election, an event where people vote for members in a political body
- Global Entry, trusted traveler program of the United States
- g℮, a label of estimated mass (in grams)
