= Balik Kampung =

Malay term in Southeast Asia

Balik Kampung (English: "return to village") is a Malay term for the return to one's hometown during religious and cultural festivals. The term is used in Malaysia, Singapore and Brunei, during festive seasons such as Hari Raya Aidilfitri, Deepavali and Chinese New Year. The practice causes significant traffic on major highways.

In Indonesia, it is known as Pulang Kampung or Mudik.

== In popular culture ==
- Balik Kampung, a 1986 Malay film
- Balik Kampung, a song by Malaysian singer Sudirman Arshad
