= Chen Hong (actress) =

Chinese actress and film producer

- Born: December 13, 1968 (age 57); Shangrao, Jiangxi, China
- Occupations: Actress; producer
- Years active: 1989–present
- Height: 1.65 m (5 ft 5 in)
- Spouse: Chen Kaige (m. 1997)
- Children: 2, including Arthur Chen

Chinese name
- Traditional Chinese: 陳紅
- Simplified Chinese: 陈红
Transcriptions
Standard Mandarin
- Hanyu Pinyin: Chén Hóng

Chen Hong (born December 13, 1968) is a Chinese actress and film producer. She is known for her roles in TV series Between Water and Clouds (1993), Romance of the Three Kingdoms (1994) and Palace of Desire (2000). After marrying film director Chen Kaige in 1997, she co-produced and acted in the films Together (2002), The Promise (2005), Forever Enthralled (2008) and Sacrifice (2010).

== Filmography ==
=== Film ===
| Year | Title | Role | Notes/Ref. |
|---|---|---|---|
| 1989 | A Dream of Red Mansions 红楼梦 | Zijuan | Appears in parts 4, 5, 6 |
| 1990 | Hello, Pacific Ocean 你好，太平洋 | | |
| 1990 | Dai Nü Zhi Lian 傣女之恋 | Aiba | |
| 1990 | Rongma Shusheng 戎马书生 | Li Tingting | |
| 1993 | Far Far Place 在那遥远的地方 | | |
| 1993 | The Foggy House 雾宅 | | |
| 1994 | Love Spy 情谍 | Xiaofang | |
| 1995 | Blush 红粉 | | |
| 1995 | The Conqueror 征服者 | | |
| 1996 | A Story of Xiangxiang 香香闹油坊 | Xiangxiang | |
| 2002 | Together 和你在一起 | Lili | Also producer |
| 2005 | The Promise 无极 | Manshen | Also producer |
| 2007 | Sweet Revenge 寄生人 | Yung's mother | |
| 2008 | Forever Enthralled 梅兰芳 | Fu Zhifang | Also producer |
| 2009 | The Founding of a Republic 建国大业 | Reporter | |
| 2010 | Sacrifice 赵氏孤儿 | | Also producer |
| 2011 | The Lost Bladesman 关云长 | Lady Gan | |
| 2012 | Caught in the Web 搜索 | | |
| 2012 | Shamen Kong Hai 沙门空海 | | |

=== Television ===
| Year | Title | Role | Notes |
|---|---|---|---|
| | Taiwan Nü'er 台湾女儿 | | |
| 1989 | Liaozhai 聊斋 | Liancheng | |
| 1990 | Dushi Xingjing 都市刑警 | Gu Ying | |
| 1993 | Three Lanes of Plum Blossoms · Between Water and Clouds 梅花三弄之水云间 | Wang Zixuan | |
| 1994 | Romance of the Three Kingdoms 三国演义 | Diaochan | |
| 1994 | Yan Suo Chong Lou 烟锁重楼 | Liu Yincui | |
| 1996 | Xin Longmen Kezhan 新龙门客栈 | Qiu Moyan | |
| 1996 | Jinsheng Jinshi 今生今世 | Qin Anqi | |
| 1998 | The Return of the Condor Heroes 神雕侠侣 | Li Mochou | |
| 2000 | Palace of Desire 大明宫词 | Princess Taiping | |
| 2000 | Sunny Piggy 春光灿烂猪八戒 | Chang'e | |
| 2001 | Fengchen Wu Die 风尘舞蝶 | Hua Yanhong | |
| 2002 | New York Tempest 纽约风暴 | Mou Xiya | |
| 2002 | Lü Bu Yu Diaochan 吕布与貂蝉 | Diaochan | Also producer |
