= Chen Kaige =

Chinese filmmaker (born 1952)

- 陈凯歌
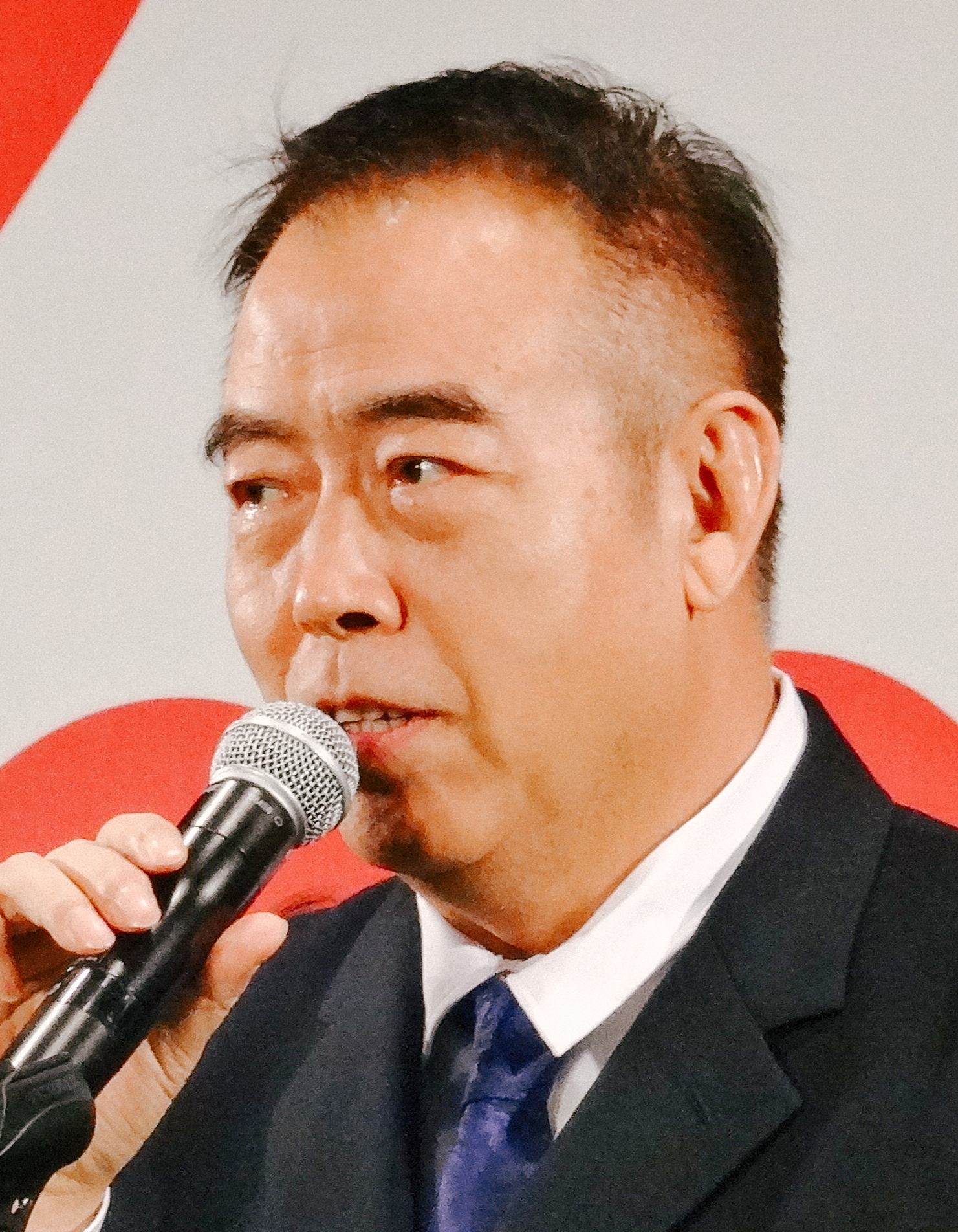
- Chen at the 2013 Tokyo International Film Festival
- Born: Chen Aige（陈皑鸽） 12 August 1952 (age 74); Beijing, China
- Education: Beijing Film Academy
- Occupations: Film director; screenwriter; film producer
- Years active: 1984–present
- Movement: Fifth Generation
- Spouses: Sun Jialin (m. 1983; div. 1986) Hung Huang (m. 1989; div. 1993) Chen Hong (m. 1996)
- Children: 2, including Arthur Chen
- Parent(s): Chen Huai'ai (father); Liu Yanchi (mother)
- Relatives: Chen He (nephew)
- Awards: Full list

Chen Kaige
- Simplified Chinese: 陈凯歌
- Traditional Chinese: 陳凱歌
Transcriptions
Standard Mandarin
- Hanyu Pinyin: Chén Kǎigē
- IPA: [ʈʂʰə̌n kʰàɪ.kɤ́]

Chen Kaige (Chinese: 陈凯歌; born 12 August 1952) is a Chinese filmmaker. A leading figure of the fifth generation of Chinese directors, Chen is known for his visual flair and epic storytelling. For Farewell My Concubine (1993), Chen became the first Chinese director to win the Palme d'Or at the Cannes Film Festival.

== Early life ==
Chen Kaige was born in Beijing, China into a family of Changle, Fuzhou origin, and grew up with fellow Fifth Generation alumnus Tian Zhuangzhuang as a childhood friend. His father Chen Huai'ai was a well-known director in his own right. His mother Liu Yanchi (刘燕驰) was a senior screenwriter. During the Cultural Revolution, Chen joined the Red Guards and denounced his own father, a fateful decision he eventually learned to regret and informs much of his work, notably in the unblinking depictions of the Cultural Revolution in Farewell My Concubine, and in the father-son relationship in Together. In 1969, Chen became a sent-down youth in Xishuangbanna Agricultural Reclamation Bureau before enlisting in the People's Liberation Army (PLA) next year. In 1975, Chen was discharged from the army and returned to Beijing, where he worked as a worker in Beijing Film Printing Factory. In 1978 Chen joined the Beijing Film Academy, where he graduated in 1982.

== Career ==
Upon graduating, Chen was assigned to the Guangxi Film Studio, along with a fellow graduate, Zhang Yimou. His first movie, Yellow Earth (1984), established itself as one of the most important works of Fifth Generation filmmaking; though simple, its powerful visual imagery, courtesy of cinematography by Zhang, and revolutionary storytelling style marked a sea change in how films were seen and perceived in the People's Republic of China. The film is unique in terms of concept, structure, and style, in line with the "cultural roots seeking" trend that emerged in China in the 1980s. The purpose of filming this film is to attempt to explore the deep cultural heritage of national history and spirit from a cultural perspective. The Big Parade (1986) and King of the Children (1987) expanded on his filmic repertoire. In 1987, he was awarded a fellowship by the Asian Cultural Council and served as a visiting scholar at the New York University Film School. Early in 1989, he did further experiment in a music video for the song "Do You Believe in Shame?" by Duran Duran. Later that year, he made Life on a String, a highly esoteric movie which uses mythical allegory and lush scenery to tell the story of a blind sanxian musician and his student. In the same year, he was a member of the jury at the 39th Berlin International Film Festival.

His most famous film in the West, Farewell My Concubine (1993), follows two Beijing opera stars through decades of change in China during the twentieth century. The film was nominated for two Academy Awards and won the Palme d'Or at 1993 Cannes Film Festival and the 1993 International Federation of Film Critics Award. Chen followed up the unprecedented success of Farewell My Concubine with Temptress Moon (1996), another period drama starring Leslie Cheung and Gong Li. Though it was well received by most critics, it did not achieve the accolades that Concubine did, and many were put off by the film's convoluted plot line. Almost as famous is his The Emperor and the Assassin (1999), an epic involving the legendary King of Qin and the reluctant assassin who aims to kill him.

In 2002, Chen made his first, and to-date only, English-language film, Killing Me Softly, a thriller starring Heather Graham and Joseph Fiennes, though it proved to be both a critical and popular disappointment. Together (2002) in the same year, which marked the beginning of his wife Chen Hong as his producer, is an intimate film about a young violinist and his father, showing the desire of young people to grow according to their spiritual guidance. In the short "Ten Minutes, Aging", the finale of the collection "Deep in Flowers," which opened the Cannes Film Festival in France in 2002, Chen selects the theme of urban renewal, a nation-wide program across China at the time characterized by large-scale demolition, and tells the story of the mentally ill "Mr. Feng" moving in a seemingly humorous tone. In 2005, he directed The Promise, an all-star fantasy wuxia picture, which saw Chen shifting to a more commercial mindset, regarded by some as a "radical stylistic turn" from his previous works.

In 2006, he was awarded the Lifetime Achievement Award at the 28th Moscow International Film Festival. In 2008, Chen directed Forever Enthralled, a biopic of Peking opera artist Mei Lanfang, followed by Sacrifice (2010), a re-imagining of the Chinese play The Orphan of Zhao. His 2012 film Caught in the Web, a reflection on internet culture—sometimes interpreted as his response to the parody frenzy surrounding The Promise—was selected as the Chinese entry for the Best Foreign Language Oscar at the 85th Academy Awards, but it did not make the final shortlist. His film Monk Comes Down the Mountain (2015), which may have suffered from editing issues due to the drug scandal involving one of its stars, Jaycee Chan, was a critical failure but achieved commercial success. He then directed Legend of the Demon Cat (2017), a big-budget Chinese-Japanese co-production adapted from the novel of the same name by Japanese fantasy novelist Baku Yumemakura.

Since 2019, Chen directed or produced a series of propaganda films that are sometimes commissioned by the Chinese government, including co-directing The Battle at Lake Changjin (2021), with Tsui Hark and Dante Lam. China's highest-grossing film of all time.

In addition to directing, Chen has acted in several films, including Bernardo Bertolucci's The Last Emperor (1987) and his own The Emperor and the Assassin and Together.

== Personal life ==
Chen's first wife was Sun Jialin (孙加林), whom he knew while working at the Beijing Film Factory from 1975 to 1978; they married in 1983 and divorced three years later. His second wife was Hong Huang, daughter of Zhang Hanzhi, a diplomat and English teacher of Mao Zedong. Through his second marriage, Chen obtained a US green card. They separated in 1991 and divorced in 1993. From 1991, Chen lived with Ni Ping, a television personality, in a six-year relationship. In 1996, Chen married actress Chen Hong, who has been his producer since Together (2002). They have two sons, Chen Yu'ang and "Arthur" Chen Feiyu.

== Filmography ==
Year	Title	Chinese Title	Director	Writer	Producer	Notes
1984	Yellow Earth	黃土地	Yes	Yes	No	
1986	The Big Parade	大閱兵	Yes	No	No	
1987	King of the Children	孩子王	Yes	Yes	No	
1991	Life on a String	邊走邊唱	Yes	Yes	No	
1993	Farewell My Concubine	霸王別姬	Yes	No	No	Palme d'Or winner at the 1993 Cannes Film Festival
1996	Temptress Moon	風月	Yes	Yes	No	
1998	The Emperor and the Assassin	荊柯刺秦王	Yes	Yes	Yes	
2002	Killing Me Softly	温柔地杀我	Yes	No	No	
2002	100 Flowers Hidden Deep		Yes	No	No	Segment in the anthology film Ten Minutes Older: The Trumpet
2002	Together	和你在一起	Yes	Yes	Yes	2002 Silver Seashell for Best Director at the San Sebastián International Film Festival
2005	The Promise	無極	Yes	Yes	Yes	
2007	Zhanxiou Village		Yes	No	No	Vignette in the anthology film To Each His Cinema
2008	Forever Enthralled	梅兰芳	Yes	No	No	
2010	Sacrifice	趙氏孤兒	Yes	Yes	No	
2012	Caught in the Web	搜索	Yes	Yes	No	Fictional treatment of the human flesh search engine.
2015	Monk Comes Down the Mountain	道士下山	Yes	Yes	No	
2017	Legend of the Demon Cat	妖猫传	Yes	Yes	No	
2019	My People, My Country	我和我的祖国	Yes	No	No	
2021	The Battle at Lake Changjin	长津湖	Yes	No	Yes	
2022	The Battle at Lake Changjin II	长津湖之水门桥	Yes	No	Yes	
2023	Flowers Bloom in the Ashes	尘埃里开花	Yes	No	Yes	
2023	The Volunteers: To the War	志愿军：雄兵出击	Yes	No	No	
2024	The Volunteers: The Battle of Life and Death	志愿军：存亡之战	Yes	No	No	
2025	The Volunteers: Peace at Last	志愿军：浴血和平	Yes	No	No	
TBA	Swan Song		Yes	No	No	

=== Television (as director) ===
Year	English Tltle	Chinese title	Notes/Ref.
1984	Emergency Take-off	强行起飞	
2002	Lubu and Diaochan	吕布与貂蝉	

=== Executive producer ===
Year	English title	Chinese title	Notes	Ref.
2020	Something Just Like This	青春创世纪	iQIYI web series	
2020	The Eight	民初奇人传	iQIYI web series	

=== Actor ===
Year	English title	Chinese title	Role	Notes
1987	The Last Emperor	末代皇帝	Captain of Imperial Guard	
1999	The Emperor and the Assassin	荊柯刺秦王	Lü Buwei	
2001	The Grand Mansion Gate	大宅门	An official	guest
2002	Together	和你在一起	Yu Shifeng	
2009	The Founding of a Republic	建國大業	Feng Yuxiang	
2012	The Monkey King 3D: Uproar in Heaven	大闹天宫3D	Dragon King of the East China Sea	Voice role

== Awards and nominations ==
=== International ===
Year	Nominated work	Award	Result	Ref.
Cannes Film Festival
1988 (41st)	King of the Children	Palme d'Or	Nominated	
1991 (44th)	Life on a String	Palme d'Or	Nominated	
1993 (46th)	Farewell My Concubine	Palme d'Or	Won	
1993 (46th)	Farewell My Concubine	FIPRESCI Prize	Won	
1996 (49th)	Temptress Moon	Palme d'Or	Nominated	
1999 (52nd)	The Emperor and the Assassin	Palme d'Or	Nominated	
Berlin International Film Festival
2009 (59th)	Forever Enthralled	Golden Bear	Nominated	
Academy Awards
1994 (66th)	Farewell My Concubine	Best International Feature Film	Nominated	
Golden Globe Awards
1994 (51st)	Farewell My Concubine	Best Foreign Language Film	Won	
2006 (63rd)	The Promise	Best Foreign Language Film	Nominated	
César Awards
1994 (19th)	Farewell My Concubine	Best Foreign Film	Nominated	
Tokyo International Film Festival
2008		Akira Kurosawa Award	Won	
Montreal World Film Festival
1987 (11th)	The Big Parade	Jury Grand Prize	Won	
Locarno Festival
1985 (38th)	Yellow Earth	Silver Leopard Award	Won	
1985 (38th)	Yellow Earth	Prize of the Ecumenical Jury	Won	
Thessaloniki International Film Festival
2006 (47th)		Lifetime Achievement Award	Won	

=== Domestic ===
Year	Nominated work	Award	Result	Ref.
Golden Rooster Awards
2004 (22nd)	Together	Best Director	Won	
2004 (22nd)	Together	Best Picture	Nominated	
2009 (27th)	Forever Enthralled	Best Picture	Won	
2009 (27th)	Forever Enthralled	Best Director	Nominated	
2020 (33rd)	My People, My Country	Best Director	Nominated	
2022 (35th)	The Battle at Lake Changjin	Best Director	Won	
Hundred Flowers Awards
2020 (35th)	My People, My Country	Best Director	Nominated	
Huabiao Awards
2009 (13th)	Forever Enthralled	Outstanding Director	Won	
2009 (13th)	Forever Enthralled	Outstanding Film	Won	
2011 (14th)	Sacrifice	Outstanding Film	Won	
China Film Directors Association
2018 (9th)	Legend of the Demon Cat	Film of the Year	Nominated	
2018 (9th)	Legend of the Demon Cat	Director of the Year	Nominated	
Chinese Film Media Awards
2003 (3rd)	Together	Best Director	Nominated	
2011 (11th)	Sacrifice	Filmmaker of the Year	Won	
Huading Awards
2020 (27th)	My People, My Country	Best Film Director Award	Nominated	
Shanghai International Film Festival
2010 (13th)		Chinese-language Film Outstanding Contribution Award	Won	
Beijing College Student Film Festival
2009 (16th)	Forever Enthralled	Best Director	Won	
2009 (16th)	Forever Enthralled	Best Film	Won	
2018 (25th)	Legend of the Demon Cat	Best Director	Nominated	
2018 (25th)	Legend of the Demon Cat	Best Viewing Effect Award	Won	
Hong Kong Film Award
2004 (23rd)	Together	Best Asian Film Award	Nominated	
2009 (28th)	Forever Enthralled	Best Asian Film Award	Nominated	
Macau International Movie Festival
2018 (10th)	Legend of the Demon Cat	Best Picture	Nominated	
2018 (10th)	Legend of the Demon Cat	Best Director	Nominated	

== See also ==
- Zhang Yimou
- Tian Zhuangzhuang
