= Cinema of East Asia =

The Cinema of East Asia refers to the film industries of countries located in East Asia. The most significant film industries that are categorized as East Asian cinema are the industries of Mainland China, Hong Kong, Japan, South Korea, and Taiwan. The term is sometimes confused with Southeast Asian cinema, as the cinematic traditions between the two Asian sub-regions have their own uniquely distinct markers that are often conflated and incorrectly referred to as such, which include the likes of Singapore, Malaysia, Indonesia, Vietnam, Thailand, and the Philippines.

East Asian cinema is responsible for several genres distinct from the cinema of other regions. These genres include Martial arts films and Anime. While East Asian cinema was initially relegated to local audiences, its global influence steadily increased. Each country included in East Asian cinema has its own prominent directors, actors, and actresses.

== Styles and genres ==
The scope of East Asian cinema is huge and covers a vast array of different film styles and genres, as the region's rich cinematic traditions are particularly well-known internationally for its production of the following types of genres:

- Martial arts films — including Hong Kong martial arts films (such as period kung fu films, chopsocky, Bruceploitation and Wuxia) and Japanese martial arts films (including ninja films)
- Hong Kong action cinema —including martial arts, stunt action, action comedy, gun fu, and girls with guns
- Jidaigeki — Japanese period films, including Samurai cinema (chanbara) and ninja films
- Horror films — including Japanese horror and Korean horror
- Anime — Japanese animation
- Drama films — including Korean drama (Korean-style telenovela and soap opera film) and Dorama (Japanese drama)
- Gangster films — including heroic bloodshed films (Hong Kong action crime films, usually centered on Chinese Triad crime organisations) and Japanese gangster films (Yakuza films and punk films)
- Japanese science fiction — including Tokusatsu (such as Kaiju monster films and superhero films), Japanese cyberpunk, and steampunk

== History ==
=== 1890s–1950s ===
Even as Hollywood began dominating cinemas worldwide, receiving 80% of its revenue from screenings abroad, East Asian film industries were largely able to hold their own against foreign imports. Local audiences tended to favor domestic films over glamorous Hollywood products, allowing East Asian producers to develop their own forms of artistic expression. Japan, for example, had grown a vibrant film industry by the Roaring 20s, despite its first film production studio only opening in 1909. The popularity of East Asian films and directors rarely extended beyond the region itself, with films seldom exported. In this relative isolation, several distinctive genres and styles developed, such as the growth of martial arts films in 1930s-40s Hong Kong.

=== 1950s: global influence ===
East Asian cinema has—to widely varying degrees from nation to nation—had a global audience since at least the 1950s. At the beginning of the decade, Akira Kurosawa's Rashomon (1950) and Kenji Mizoguchi's Ugetsu (1953) both captured prizes at the Venice Film Festival and elsewhere, and by the middle of the decade Teinosuke Kinugasa's Gate of Hell (1953) and the first part of Hiroshi Inagaki's Samurai Trilogy (1954) had won Oscars. Kurosawa's Seven Samurai (1954) became a global success; Japanese cinema had burst into international consciousness.

By the end of the decade, several critics associated with French journal Cahiers du cinéma published some of the first Western studies on Japanese film; many of those critics went on to become founding members of the French nouvelle vague, which began simultaneously with the Japanese New Wave.

=== 1960s and 1970s ===
By the late 60s and early 70s, Japanese cinema had begun to become seriously affected by the collapse of the studio system, with audiences decreasing from 1.2 billion to 0.2 billion from 1960 to 1980. As Japanese cinema slipped into a period of relative low visibility, the cinema of Hong Kong entered a dramatic renaissance of its own, largely a side effect of the development of the wuxia blending of action, history, and spiritual concerns. Several major figures emerged in Hong Kong at this time, including King Hu, whose 1966 Come Drink With Me was a key influence upon many subsequent Hong Kong cinematic developments. Shortly thereafter, the American and Hong Kong actor Bruce Lee became a global icon, beginning a new wave of popularity for martial arts films. However, the 1970s were also the death knell of Cantonese cinema, with the Hong Kong film industry switching to larger, commercialized Mandarin films. The Korean film industry also experienced a golden age during the 1960s, producing iconic films such as The Housemaid, Aimless Bullet, and The Devil's Stairway.

== Influence and impact ==
As the popularity of East Asian films has endured, it is unsurprising that members of the Western film industry would cite their influences (notably George Lucas, Robert Altman and Martin Scorsese citing Akira Kurosawa; and Jim Jarmusch and Paul Schrader's similar mentions of Yasujirō Ozu), and—on occasion—work to introduce less well-known filmmakers to Western audiences (such as the growing number of Eastern films released with the endorsement "Quentin Tarantino Presents").

=== Remakes: East and West ===
Another sign of the increasing influence of East Asian film in the West is the number of East Asian films that have been remade in Hollywood and European cinema, a tradition extending at least as far back as Western remakes of Akira Kurosawa films, such as John Sturges' 1960 The Magnificent Seven (based on Seven Samurai, 1954), and Martin Ritt's 1964 The Outrage (based on Rashomon, 1950), continuing through present-day remakes of J-Horror films like Ring (1998) and Ju-on: The Grudge (2002). Other films have also been remade such as The Departed (based on Infernal Affairs, 2002), The Lake House (based on Il Mare, 2000), Tortilla Soup (based on Eat Drink Man Woman, 1994) etc.

The influence also goes the other way. A number of East Asian films have also been based upon Western source material as varied as the quickie Hong Kong film remakes of Hollywood hits as well as Kurosawa's adaptations of works by William Shakespeare (The Bad Sleep Well, Throne of Blood, and Ran), Maxim Gorky (The Lower Depths), and Ed McBain (High and Low).

== Prominent directors ==
Some of the most accomplished directors of East Asian cinema include:

=== China ===
- Cai Chusheng (1906–1968) — Influential Chinese director of the 1930s and 1940s. Best known for his film Spring River Flows East, which is frequently regarded as one of the masterpieces of Chinese cinema.
- Chen Kaige (born 1952) — Fifth-Generation Chinese film director known for films such as Farewell My Concubine, The Emperor and the Assassin, and Yellow Earth (one of the first Chinese films to compete in international film festivals after the Cultural Revolution).
- Jiang Wen (born 1963) — Famous Chinese actor turned director. Best known for In the Heat of the Sun and Devils on the Doorstep, which won the Grand Prize of the Jury at the 2000 Cannes Film Festival.
- Jia Zhangke (born 1970) — One of the most prominent Sixth-Generation Chinese film directors. His most renowned works includes the highly acclaimed Platform, Unknown Pleasures, and The World.
- Fei Mu (1906–1951) — Pioneering Chinese director in the 1940s. Best known for the film Spring in a Small Town, which is considered by many to be the best Chinese film ever made.
- Lou Ye (born 1965) — Sixth-Generation film director of Purple Butterfly, Summer Palace, and Suzhou River.
- Lu Chuan (born 1970) — Sixth-Generation Chinese film director. Best known for The Missing Gun and the award-winning Kekexili: Mountain Patrol.
- Tian Zhuangzhuang (born 1952) — One of the most prominent Fifth-Generation film directors. Known for films such as The Blue Kite and The Horse Thief.
- Wang Xiaoshuai (born 1966) — Award-winning Sixth-Generation Chinese film director.
- Wu Yonggang (1907–1982) — Chinese director of the 1930s best known for his work with the actress Ruan Lingyu, such as The Goddess.
- Xie Jin (1923–2008) — Well-known Chinese director during the Cultural Revolution. Notable works includes: The Red Detachment of Women, Two Stage Sisters.
- Yuan Muzhi (1909–1978) — Chinese director best known for the film Street Angel starring actress Zhou Xuan.
- Zhang Yimou (born 1950) — Fifth-Generation film director known for his sumptuous visual styles and allegorical story-tellings. Notable films: Red Sorghum, Raise the Red Lantern, To Live, and Hero.
- Zhang Yuan (born 1963) — Sixth-Generation Chinese film director best known for the film East Palace, West Palace.
- Zhu Shilin (1899–1967) — Influential Chinese director of the early sound era.

=== Hong Kong ===
- Jackie Chan (born 1954).
- Stephen Chow (born 1962) — Director, actor and comedian, best known in the West for the films Shaolin Soccer and Kung Fu Hustle.
- Ringo Lam (born 1954) — Best known for the film City on Fire starring Chow Yun-fat; has also worked with Jean-Claude Van Damme.
- Tsui Hark (born 1950) — Major commercial Hong Kong director; Hark attended film school in the U.S. Best known for Zu, the Once Upon A Time In China series, and Green Snake, among many other films.
- Ann Hui (born 1947) — Hui emerged from the late 1970s Hong Kong new wave, gaining attention for Spooky Bunch and Boat People.
- Sammo Hung (born 1952) — Director, actor and stuntman of Hong Kong action cinema, famed for starring, directing and choreographing Kung Fu martial arts films for over 40 years, as well as his association with fellow stars Jackie Chan and Yuen Biao and the hit US television series Martial Law.
- Stanley Kwan (born 1957) — Director of Rouge, Center Stage and Lan Yu. Kwan is notable as one of a small number of directors who have successfully blurred the boundaries between "art" and "popular" cinema.
- Clara Law (born 1957) — Law was one of the key figures in the late 1970s Hong Kong new wave, well known for Autumn Moon and Temptation of a Monk.
- Johnnie To (born 1955) — Internationally acclaimed director of genre films, known for All About Ah Long (1989), Fulltime Killer (2001), Election 2 (a.k.a. Triad Election ) (2006) and Exiled (2006). He is a darling of film festivals, from Cannes Film Festival to Venice Film Festival.
- Lo Wei (1918–1996).
- Wong Kar-wai (born 1958) — Internationally influential director known for his expressive stylishness. In the Mood For Love and Chungking Express are among his best-known films.
- John Woo (born 1946) — One of the best known East Asian directors to Western audiences, his domestic output includes the Chow Yun-fat films The Killer and Hard Boiled and his Western films include Mission: Impossible 2, Broken Arrow, Face/Off and Paycheck
- Yuen Woo-ping (born 1945) — Director of classic kung fu films including the Drunken Master (starring Jackie Chan) and Magnificent Butcher (starring Sammo Hung). In his later years his expertise as a martial arts choreographer has been sought by Western directors and he has worked on films including The Matrix series, Crouching Tiger, Hidden Dragon and Quentin Tarantino's Kill Bill.

=== Japan ===
- Kinji Fukasaku (1930–2003) — Director known for his groundbreaking yakuza films, including Battles Without Honor and Humanity (1973), as well as Battle Royale (2000).
- Susumu Hani (born 1928) — Prominent independent filmmaker during the 1960s Japanese new wave, known for She and He and Nanami, First Love. After a retreat from feature filmmaking in the 1970s, Hani subsequently gained renown as a nature documentarian.
- Ishirō Honda (1911–1993) — Known primarily for his tokusatsu and kaiju monster films, particularly for bringing the first Godzilla film, Godzilla (1954) to audiences. His many other films include Mothra (1961), King Kong vs. Godzilla (1962), Mothra vs. Godzilla (1964) and Destroy All Monsters (1968).
- Kon Ichikawa (1915–2008) — Influential postwar director of Tokyo Olympiad (1965), The Burmese Harp (1956), Fires On The Plain (1959) and Conflagration (Enjo, 1959).
- Tadashi Imai (1912–1991) — Imai emerged during the postwar years as a pioneering independent filmmaker, usually working outside the studio system and preferring an approach and viewpoint greatly influenced by Italian neo-realism. Night Drum (1958) and Muddy Waters are two of his best known films.
- Shōhei Imamura (1926–2006) — First Japanese director to win 2 Palme d'Or awards at the Cannes Film Festival, for The Ballad of Narayama (1983) and The Eel (1998). Other films include The Insect Woman (1963) and Black Rain (1989).
- Hiroshi Inagaki (1905–1980) — Historical melodramatist and former child star best known for the Samurai Trilogy (1956–58), Rickshaw Man (1959) and Chushingura (1962).
- Shunji Iwai (born 1963) — Director of Swallowtail Butterfly and All About Lily Chou-Chou.
- Keisuke Kinoshita (1912–1998) — Director best known for Twenty-Four Eyes (1954) and Carmen Comes Home (1952), Japan's first color film.
- Teinosuke Kinugasa (1896–1982) — Pioneering director of A Page of Madness (1926) and The Gate of Hell (1953).
- Ryuhei Kitamura (born 1969) — A former director of pop music videos and television commercials, his films have a distinctly modern style and include Versus, Azumi and the most recent incarnation of the giant Kaiju reptile, Godzilla: Final Wars.
- Takeshi Kitano (born 1947) — A gifted, multi-faceted artist and performer, Kitano's best-regarded directorial efforts include Sonatine and Hana-bi. Kitano is also known for his acting, in such films as Battle Royale and Taboo.
- Masaki Kobayashi (1916–1996) — Director of The Human Condition trilogy (1956–61), Harakiri (1962) and Kwaidan (1964).
- Hirokazu Koreeda (born 1962) — Former documentarian known internationally for the feature films Maborosi (1996), after life (1999), Distance (2001) and Nobody Knows (2004).
- Akira Kurosawa (1910–1998) — Renowned director, whose classic films include Ikiru, Rashomon, Seven Samurai, Kagemusha and Ran.
- Kiyoshi Kurosawa (born 1955) — Not related to the other Kurosawa, his films include Cure and the J-Horror hit, Kairo.
- Takashi Miike (born 1960) — Prolific director of often bizarre and violent films. He is best known in the West for Audition, Ichi the Killer, The Happiness of the Katakuris.
- Hayao Miyazaki (born 1941) — Acclaimed anime director and head of Studio Ghibli. His creations include Princess Mononoke, Spirited Away and most recently, The Boy and the Heron.
- Kenji Mizoguchi (1898–1956) — Important, influential director of The Life of Oharu (1952), Ugetsu Monogatari (1953), and Sansho the Bailiff (1954).
- Hideo Nakata (born 1961) — Director of modern J-Horror films such as Ring and Dark Water.
- Mikio Naruse (1905–1969) — Influential director of Flowing (1956) and When a Woman Ascends the Stairs (1960). His 1935 Wife, Be Like A Rose was among the first Japanese films to gain an American theatrical release.
- Kihachi Okamoto (1923–2005) — Prolific director. Best known in the West for his nihilistic samurai film "The Sword of Doom" (1966)
- Nagisa Oshima (1932—2013) — A key figure in the Japanese new wave, known for Cruel Story Of Youth (1960), Night And Fog In Japan (1960), In the Realm of the Senses (1976) and Merry Christmas, Mr. Lawrence (1983).
- Yasujirō Ozu (1903–1963) — Influential director of Late Spring (1949), Early Summer (1951), Tokyo Story (1953), and Good Morning (1959)
- Katsuhiro Otomo (born 1954) — Manga artist and anime director responsible for Akira and Steamboy.
- Kaneto Shindo (born 1912) — Director of Naked Island (1960) and Onibaba (1964).
- Hiroshi Teshigahara (1927–2001) — Experimental filmmaker associated with the 60s new wave; best known for The Pitfall (1962) and Woman in the Dunes (1964).
- Shirō Toyoda (1906–1977) — Satirist and dramatist best known for a 1959 adaptation of Yasunari Kawabata's Snow Country.
- Sadao Yamanaka (1909–1938) — Humanity and Paper Balloons, one of very few surviving works directed by Yamanaka, who was acknowledged as an influence by both Yasujirō Ozu and Akira Kurosawa.

=== South Korea ===
- Bong Joon-ho (born 1969) — Director of critically acclaimed Memories of Murder (2003), Gwoemul (a.k.a. The Host, 2006), and Parasite (2019). Parasite also became the first South Korean film to receive Academy Award nominations, with Bong winning Best Picture, Best Director, and Best Original Screenplay, making Parasite the first film not in English to win Best Picture.
- Choi Dong-hoon (born 1971) — Director and screenwriter of Tazza: The High Rollers (2006), The Thieves (2012), and Assassination (2015), which are all some of the highest-grossing films in Korea.
- Im Kwon-taek (born 1936) — One of Korea's most acclaimed directors. Director of Sopyonje (1993) and Chihwaseon (2002).
- Kang Je-gyu (born 1962) — Director of the hit Korean film, Shiri and the war film Taegukgi (a.k.a. Brotherhood), one of the highest-grossing films in Korea.
- Kim Jee-woon (born 1964) — Director of The Quiet Family (1998), A Tale of Two Sisters (2003), and A Bittersweet Life (2005).
- Kim Ki-duk (born 1960) — Best known in the West for the hit films The Isle, Spring, Summer, Autumn, Winter... and Spring and 3-Iron.
- Kim Ki-young (1919–1998) — Director of The Housemaid (1960).
- Na Woon-gyu (1902–1937) — Korea's first star. Writer/director/actor of Arirang (1926).
- Park Chan-wook (born 1963) — Acclaimed director known particularly for his Vengeance trilogy - Sympathy for Mr. Vengeance (2002), Oldboy (2003) and Sympathy for Lady Vengeance (2005).
- Park Kwang-su (born 1955) — Director of Geu Seom e Kagoshipta (To the Starry Island) (1993) and Areumdaun Chongnyun Jeon Tae-il (A Single Spark) (1995).
- Yu Hyun-mok (born 1925) — Director of A Stray Bullet (1960).
- Lee Chang-dong (born 1954) — Director of Oasis (2002), Secret Sunshine (2007) and Poetry (2010).
- Hong Sang-soo (born 1960) — Director of Hahaha (2010), Right Now, Wrong Then (2015) and On the Beach at Night Alone (2017).
- Na Hong-jin (born 1974) — Director of The Chaser (2008), The Yellow Sea (2010) and The Wailing (2016).

=== Taiwan ===
- King Hu (1931–1997) — Director of Come Drink With Me (1966), Dragon Gate Inn (1967) and A Touch of Zen (1971).
- Hou Hsiao-hsien (born 1947) — Director of A City of Sadness (1989).
- Edward Yang (1947–2007) — Director of A Brighter Summer Day (1991) and Yi Yi (2000).
- Ang Lee (born 1954) — The most successful director of Taiwan in Hollywood. Lee has been nominated for nine Academy Awards, of which he has won three: Best Foreign Language Film for Crouching Tiger Hidden Dragon (2000) and Best Director for Brokeback Mountain (2005) and Life of Pi (2012), becoming the first non-white director to win the latter. Other notable works include Eat Drink Man Woman (1994), Sense and Sensibility (1995), Hulk (2003), and Lust, Caution (2007).
- Tsai Ming-liang (born 1957) — Director of Vive L'Amour (1994) and What Time Is It There? (2001).
- Wei Te-sheng (born 1969) — Director of Cape No. 7 (2008) and Seediq Bale (2011). Cape No. 7 remains the highest grossing Taiwanese domestic film.
- Justin Lin (born 1971) — Taiwanese-born American film director. He is best known for his directorial work on Better Luck Tomorrow (2002), the Fast & Furious franchise from The Fast and the Furious: Tokyo Drift (2006) to Fast & Furious 6 (2013) and F9 (2021), and Star Trek Beyond (2016).
- Giddens Ko (born 1978) — Director of the critically acclaimed romance films You Are the Apple of My Eye (2011) and Café. Waiting. Love (2014).

== Prominent actors and actresses ==
=== China ===
- Joan Chen (born 1961) — Award-winning actress in films such as Xiao Hua, The Last Emperor, and the TV Series.
- Jet Li (born 1963) — Martial artist turned actor. Best known for the Once Upon a Time in China film series and for the international hit Hero.
- Gong Li (born 1965) — Actress known for her roles in Curse of the Golden Flower, Memoirs of a Geisha, and Mulan (2020).
- Jiang Wen (born 1963) — Actor, writer, and director known for his work on Devils on the Doorstep, Let the Bullets Fly, and Rogue One.
- Zhang Ziyi (born 1979) — Actress and model who played roles in The Road Home, Crouching Tiger, Hidden Dragon, and Rush Hour 2.
- Zhao Tao (born 1977) — Actress and producer known for her involvement in Shun Li and the Poet, Mountains May Depart, and Ash Is Purest White.
- Zhao Wei (born 1976) — Actress who is known for her roles in Shaolin Soccer, Red Cliff, and Mulan (2009).

==== Hong Kong ====
- Yuen Biao (born 1957) — Regarded as an incredible martial artist. Starred in films such as Once Upon a Time in China and The Iceman Cometh.
- Jackie Chan (born 1954) — Actor known for his dangerous stunts that have caused him many injuries. Known for his roles in many films such as Rush Hour, Who Am I?, and Police Story.
- Stephen Chow (born 1962) — Actor known for his roles in Shaolin Soccer, Kung Fu Hustle, From Beijing with Love, and more.
- Leslie Cheung (1956–2003) — Actor and writer who has played roles in Days of Being Wild, Happy Together, and A Better Tomorrow.
- Maggie Cheung (born 1964) — Award-winning actress and model known for her roles in films such as Comrades: Almost a Love Story, In the Mood for Love, and Days of Being Wild.
- Louis Fan (born 1973) — Martial artist turned actor, known for his roles in films Ip Man, Righting Wrongs, and Master of Zen.
- Louis Koo (born 1970) — Actor and producer who worked on films such as Paradox, Protégé, and Back to the Past.
- Rosamund Kwan (born 1962) — Actress known for her roles in films such as Tricky Brains, Millionaires Express, and This Thing Called Love (1991).
- Andy Lau (born 1961) — Actor, singer-songwriter, and producer known for his roles in Infernal Affairs, House of Flying Daggers, and The Warlords.
- Tony Leung Chiu-Wai (born 1962) — Actor and producer known for his roles in In the Mood for Love, Infernal Affairs, and Lust, Caution.
- Tony Leung Ka-fai (born 1958) — Award-winning actor, producer, and director known for his role in films such as Election, Ashes of Time, and The Lover.
- Bruce Lee (1940-1973) — Martial artist and actor who helped popularize the martial arts film genre in North America and Europe. He is known for his roles in films such as Enter the Dragon, Fist of Fury, and The Way of the Dragon.
- Faye Wong (born 1969) — Actress and composer known for her roles in Chungking Express, 2046, and Chinese Odyssey 2002.
- Michelle Yeoh (born 1962) — (Malaysian-born of Chinese descent and active in Hong Kong) Oscar winning actress, producer, and writer who has acted in roles for films such as Crouching Tiger, Hidden Dragon, Everything Everywhere All at Once, and Wicked.
- Chow Yun-fat (born 1955) — Actor and writer known for his roles in films such as A Better Tomorrow, Crouching Tiger, Hidden Dragon, and The Killer.
- Donnie Yen (born 1963) — Actor and martial artist known for acting in films Ip Man, Rogue One, and John Wick: Chapter 4.

=== Japan ===
- Tadanobu Asano (born 1973) — Starred in many films, such as Fried Dragon Fish, Maborosi, and Taboo.
- Setsuko Hara (1920-2025) — Prominent Japanese Actress in the 1950s. She is known for her roles Late Spring, Early Summer, and Tokyo Story.
- Takuya Kimura (born 1972) — Actor who has played roles in films such as Blade of the Immortal, 2046, and Love and Honor.
- Machiko Kyō (1924-2019) — Award-winning actress who has acted in many films such as Rashomon, Ugetsu, and Gate of Hell.
- Toshirō Mifune (1920-1997) — Japanese actor who was born in China. He is known for his roles in films such as Seven Samurai, Yojimbo, and Throne of Blood.
- Tatsuya Nakadai (1932-2025) — Actor who has been a part of many films, including Harakiri, Kagemusha, The Human Condition III: A Soldier's Prayer, and more.
- Chishū Ryū (1904-1993) — An actor with a long career (over 60 years), he is best known from his roles in Tokyo Story, Late Spring, An Autumn Afternoon, and more.
- Hiroyuki Sanada (born 1960) — Two time Primetime Emmy award winner, he is best known for his roles in The Twilight Samurai, The Wolverine, and Sunshine.
- Ken Watanabe (born 1959) — One time Oscar nominee, Watanabe is an actor and producer known for playing roles in many films such as Inception, The Last Samurai, and Godzilla (2014).
- Kōji Yakusho (born 1956) — Award-winning Japanese actor who has played roles in films like Perfect Days, 13 Assassins, and Shall We Dance?.

=== South Korea ===
- Choi Min-sik (born 1962) — Award-winning actor who acted in films such as No. 3, Shiri, and Happy End.
- Lee Byung-hun (born 1970) — Known for his roles in A Bittersweet Life, Joint Security Area, and Squid Game.
- Lee Young-ae (born 1971) — Award-winning actress known for her roles in Lady Vengeance, Joint Security Area, Jewel in the Palace, and more.
- Bae Doona (born 1979) — Model turned actress who has played roles in Cloud Atlas, Sympathy for Mr. Vengeance, The Host, and more.
- Sul Kyung-gu (born 1968) — Actor known for his roles in Peppermint Candy, Memoir of a Murderer, and Oasis.
- Jeon Do-yeon (born 1973) — Award-winning actress who is known for acting in films such as The Housemaid, Secret Sunshine, and The Shameless.
- Song Kang-ho (born 1967) — Actor and producer who has worked on many films such as Memories of Murder, The Host, and Parasite.
- Kim Hye-soo (born 1970) — Actress who was a popular teen star in the 1980s-1990s, she has acted in films such as Coin Locker Girl, Tazza: The High Rollers, and The Hypnotized.
- Ahn Sung-ki (1952-2026) — Award-winning actor known for his roles in Two Cops, The Eternal Empire, Festival, and more.

=== Taiwan ===
- Chang Chen (born 1976) — Award-winning actor who starred as the lead character in A Brighter Summer Day at the age of 14. Internationally renowned, he also has acted in films such as Dune: Part One.
- Wallace Huo (born 1979) — Acted in many TV series, most notably for The Journey of Flower, Love Me If You Dare, and The Imperial Doctress.
- Takeshi Kaneshiro (born 1973) — Taiwanese-Japanese actor who has played roles in films such as Fallen Angels, Chungking Express, and House of Flying Daggers.
- Brigitte Lin (born 1954) — Award-winning actress known for her roles in films such as Police Story, Chungking Express, and Red Dust.
- Jay Chou (born 1979) — Actor and composer known for his roles in the films Fearless, Initial D, and Curse of the Golden Flower.
- Lin Chi-ling (born 1974) — Actress and producer who has won an award for her acting. She has acted in films such as Red Cliff, The Treasure Hunter, and Beijing, New York.
- Shu Qi (born 1976) — Actress, writer, and director who has won two Gold Horse Awards, and has acted in films like The Transporter, The Assassin, and Mojin: The Lost Legend.
- Ethan Juan (born 1982) — Actor best known for his roles in Monga, The Assassin, and The Pig, the Snake and the Pigeon.
- Michelle Chen (born 1983) — Actress who is known for her roles in films such as You Are the Apple of My Eye, The Shadow Play, and Pali Road.
- Gwei Lun-mei (born 1983) — Actress best known for her roles in Secret, Girlfriend, Boyfriend, and The Stool Pigeon.
- Hsu Wei-ning (born 1984) — Award-winning actress known for the parts she played in The Tag-Along, White Lies, Black Lies, and Shards of Her.
- Ivy Chen (born 1982) — Actress who is known for her roles in Hear Me, Love, and Paradise in Service.
- Eddie Peng (born 1982) — Actor known for his roles in films such as Operation Mekong, I Did It My Way, and Hidden Man.
- Mark Chao (born 1984) — Actor best known for playing roles in Monga, Black & White: The Dawn of Justice, and The Yin-Yang Master: Dream of Eternity.
- Janine Chang (born 1982) — Actress and producer who has worked on films such as The Soul, A Place Called Silence, and The Abandoned.
- Hannah Quinlivan (born 1993) — Actress known for her roles in Skyscraper, Assassin, and Skyfire.

== See also ==
- East Asian cultural sphere
- Korean Wave
- Nuberu bagu (The Japanese New Wave)
- Asian cinema
- Southeast Asian cinema
- South Asian cinema
- Middle Eastern cinema
- Cinema of the world
- World cinema

== Collections ==
- East Asia Film Library Collection: Center for East Asian Studies, University of Chicago
