= Beijing Evening News =

Newspaper in Beijing, China

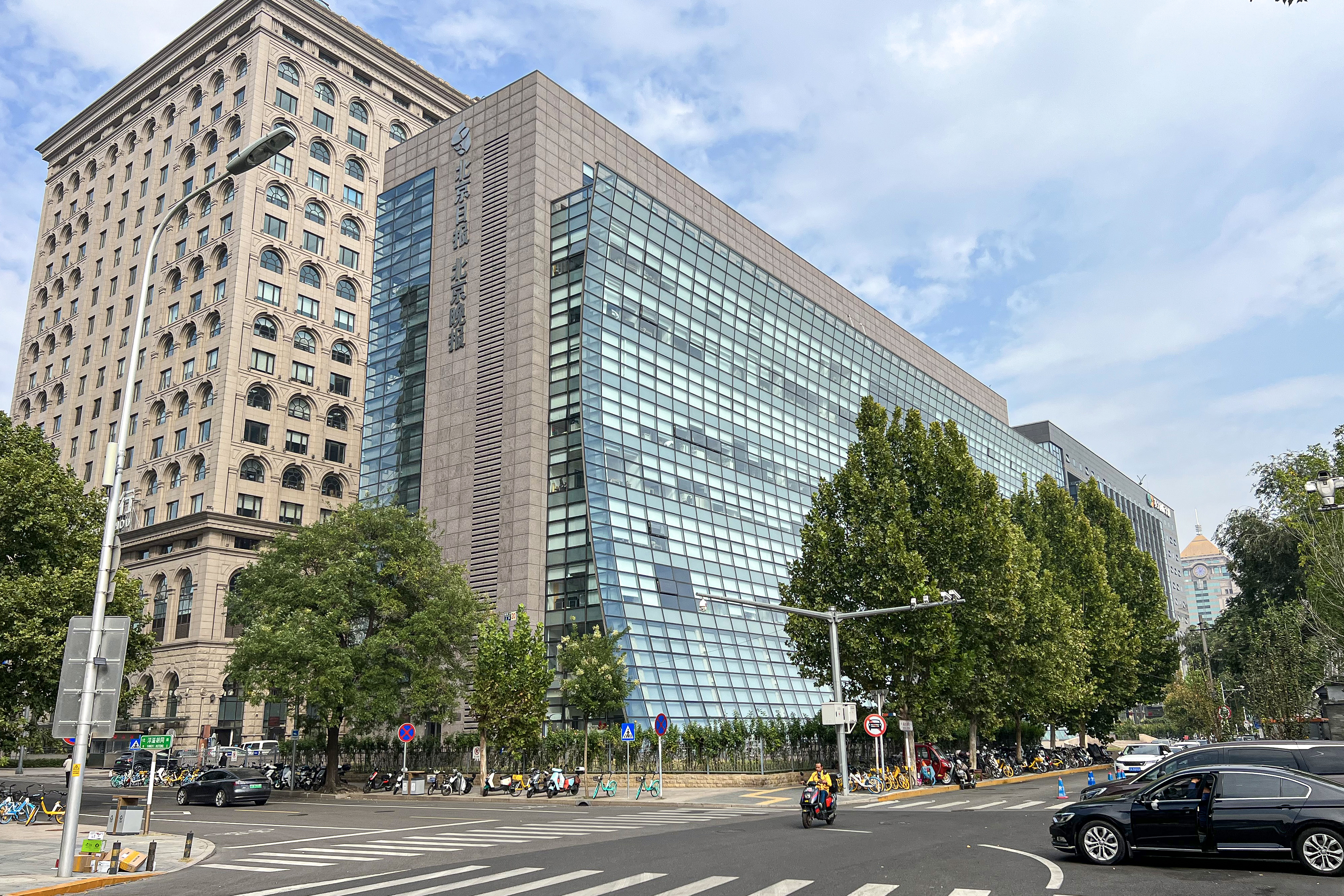
- Headquarters
- Native name: 北京晚报
- Type: Daily newspaper
- Format: Tabloid
- Founded: March 15, 1958
- Political alignment: Chinese Communist Party
- Language: Chinese
- Headquarters: Beijing
- OCLC number: 144518968
- Website: bjwb.bjd.com.cn

Beijing Evening News or Beijing Wanbao (Chinese: 北京晚报; pinyin: Běijīng Wǎnbào), also known as Beijing Evening Post, is a Chinese language tabloid newspaper in the People's Republic of China from Beijing. It was founded on March 15, 1958. Mao Zedong wrote the title for it in 1964.

Beijing Evening Post featured the best-selling novel Beijinger in New York by Glen Cao as a television series in 1991. In 2002, the newspaper was found to have lifted a fake article about the U.S. Congress' Supposed Move From Washington D.C. in protest of better facilities from The Onion.
