= Kajioka =

Kajioka (written: 梶岡) is a Japanese surname. Notable people with the surname include:

- Junichi Kajioka (梶岡 潤一), Japanese actor and producer
- Sadamichi Kajioka (梶岡 定道, 1891–1944), Imperial Japanese Navy admiral
