= You Are the Best =

You are the Best
- Theatrical release poster
- Chinese: 你行！你上！
- Hanyu Pinyin: Nǐxíng! Nǐshàng
- Directed by: Jiang Wen
- Written by: You Xiaoyin; Zhang Hansi; Jiang Wen
- Produced by: Jiang Wen; Zhou Yun
- Starring: Jiang Wen; Ma Li
- Cinematography: Mark Lee Ping-bing
- Production companies: Sichuan Daxiong Film and Television Co., Ltd
- Distributed by: China Film Group Corporation; Lian Ray Pictures; Hengdian Group
- Release date: 18 July 2025
- Running time: 144 minutes
- Country: China
- Languages: Northeastern Mandarin; English
- Box office: US$11.3 million

You are the Best (Note: also known as Let the Music Fly) (Chinese: 你行！你上！) is a 2025 Chinese biographical drama film directed, co-written by and starring Jiang Wen. Other cast consists of Ma Li, Zhang Chenghao, Wang Shuolong, Lu Yi, Yu Hewei, Yu Ailei, He Saifei, Xin Zhilei, Lei Jiayin, Ge You, Wang Chuanjun, Hu Ge, Donnie Yen, Ding Zhicheng, and Mark Lee Ping-bing. The film follows the story of Lang Guoren and his son Lang Lang, who traveled from Shenyang, China to the United States in the 1980s to play piano for local artists. The film premiered in China on 18 July 2025.

== Synopsis ==
In Shenyang, the Lang family clearly divided their roles to create a miracle. Lang Lang's mother serves as the family's financial backbone and emotional support, while his father is his early mentor, caretaker, and protector. Lang Lang only needs to focus on one thing, using his piano skills to transcend the boundaries of Western art.

== Cast ==
- Jiang Wen as Lang Guoren, father of Lang Lang
- Ma Li as Zhou Xiulan, mother of Lang Lang
- Lu Yi as Lang Lang
  - Zhang Chenghao as childhood Lang Lang
  - Wang Shuolong as young Lang Lang
- Yu Hewei as Old Cui
- Yu Ailei as Jian Sun
- He Saifei as Ou Ya
- Xin Zhilei as Teacher Lin
- Lei Jiayin as Uncle
- Ge You as Wang Ziyue
- Wang Chuanjun as Chu Zhongtian
- Hu Ge as Mr. Hu
- Donnie Yen as Alex Yang
- Ding Zhicheng as Old police officer
- Mark Lee Ping-bing as Zhuge Bole
- Jonathan Kos-Read as Sherlock Holmes
- Gina Alice as Mother of Gina Alice

== Release ==
You are the Best was released on 18 July 2025, in China.
