= Ma Shitu =

Chinese writer and politician (1915–2024)

- 马识途
- Born: Ma Qianmu; 17 January 1915; Zhong County, Sichuan, Republic of China (now in Chongqing, China)
- Died: 28 March 2024 (aged 109)
- Education: National Central University; National Southwestern Associated University
- Occupation: Novelist
- Writing career
- Language: Chinese
- Period: 1945–2020
- Genre: Novel
- Notable work: Ten Amazing Stories

Chinese name
- Traditional Chinese: 馬識途
- Simplified Chinese: 马识途
Transcriptions
Standard Mandarin
- Hanyu Pinyin: Mǎ Shítú

Ma Qianmu
- Traditional Chinese: 馬千木
- Simplified Chinese: 马千木
Transcriptions
Standard Mandarin
- Hanyu Pinyin: Mǎ Qiānmù

Ma Shitu (Chinese: 马识途; pinyin: Mǎ Shítú; 17 January 1915 – 28 March 2024) was a Chinese politician and novelist. He was president of the Sichuan Writers Association.

== Biography ==
Ma Shitu was born in Shibao Township, Zhong County, Sichuan, on 17 January 1915. In July 1936, he entered National Central University, where he majored in the Department of Chemical Engineering. During school days, he joined the underground party organisation of the Chinese Communist Party (CCP). In March 1938 he joined the CCP. He founded the Public Newspaper with Hu Sheng in Hankou, Hubei. In 1939 he was appointed party secretary of Western Hubei District. Because the party organization was destroyed by the Kuomintang, he fled to Chongqing in 1941 and then was accepted to National Southwestern Associated University. In 1946 he became the party secretary of Chuankang District.

After founding of the People's Republic of China in 1949, he served successively as deputy director of the Organization Department of the CCP Western Sichuan District Committee, director of the Construction Department of Sichuan, director of the Construction Commission, secretary of the party group of the Southwest Branch of the Chinese Academy of Sciences, deputy director of the Publicity Department of the Southwest Bureau of the CCP Central Committee, and deputy director of the Science and Technology Commission. He joined the China Writers Association in 1962. In 1972, he was deputy head of the Propaganda Department of CCP Sichuan Provincial Committee, and served until 1978, when he was appointed vice president of the Chengdu Branch of the Chinese Academy of Sciences and its party secretary. On July 5, 2020, in Chengdu, Sichuan, Ma announced that he would no longer write.

Ma was a delegate to the 6th and 7th National People's Congress.

== Personal life and death ==
Ma was twice married. His first wife was killed by the Kuomintang. He died at 19:25 on 28 March 2024, at the age of 109.

== Works ==
- 马识途文集 [Collected Works of Ma Shitu] (in Chinese). Chengdu, Sichuan: Sichuan Literature and Art Publishing House. 2018. ISBN 9787541146848.
- 在地下 [Underground] (in Chinese). Chengdu, Sichuan: Sichuan Literature and Art Publishing House. 2019. ISBN 9787541154058.
- 找红军 [Looking for the Red Army] (in Chinese). Chengdu, Sichuan: Sichuan Literature and Art Publishing House. 2019. ISBN 9787541154041.
- 夜谭十记 [Ten Amazing Stories] (in Chinese). Beijing: People's Literature Publishing House. 1983.
- 夜谭续记 (in Chinese). Beijing: People's Literature Publishing House. 2020. ISBN 9787020139262.
- 西窗琐言 (in Chinese). Suzhou, Jiangsu: Jiangsu Phoenix Literature and Art Publishing House. 2019. ISBN 9787559436061.

== Adaptations ==
His fiction, Stealing Official Position (盗官记), was made into a phenomenally successful film by Jiang Wen in 2010.
