= My Japanese Niece =

- A theatrical poster of "My Japanese Niece"
- Meitei: Eigi Japangi Imou; Japanese: マイ・ジャパニーズ・ニース
- Directed by: Mohen Naorem; Fanny Fandora (French); Sheria Vallah (Iranian); Deepsikha Poddav (Bengali); Robert Megha (Manipuri)
- Based on: Battle of Imphal (Anglo-Japanese War), World War II
- Starring: Junichi Kajioka; Yu Asada; Shunsaku Kudo; Tomoko Hayakawa; Bala Hijam; Gokul Athokpam; Abenao Elangbam; Kaiku Rajkumar; Bijou Thaangjam; Randy Brown; Wungthingchon Raihing Shimray
- Music by: Luna Luna (Japanese)
- Release date: 1 January 2015 (location)
- Countries: Japan (Tokyo); India (Imphal); Thailand (Bangkok)
- Languages: Japanese language; Meitei language (Manipuri language)
- Budget: ₹1 crore (equivalent to ₹1.5 crore or US$160,000 in 2023)

My Japanese Niece (Meitei: Eigi Japangi Imou, Japanese: マイ・ジャパニーズ・ニース, romanized: mai Japaniizu niisu) is a 2015 Japanese-Meitei bilingual film, directed by Mohen Naorem. It stars Junichi Kajioka and Yu Asada in lead roles.

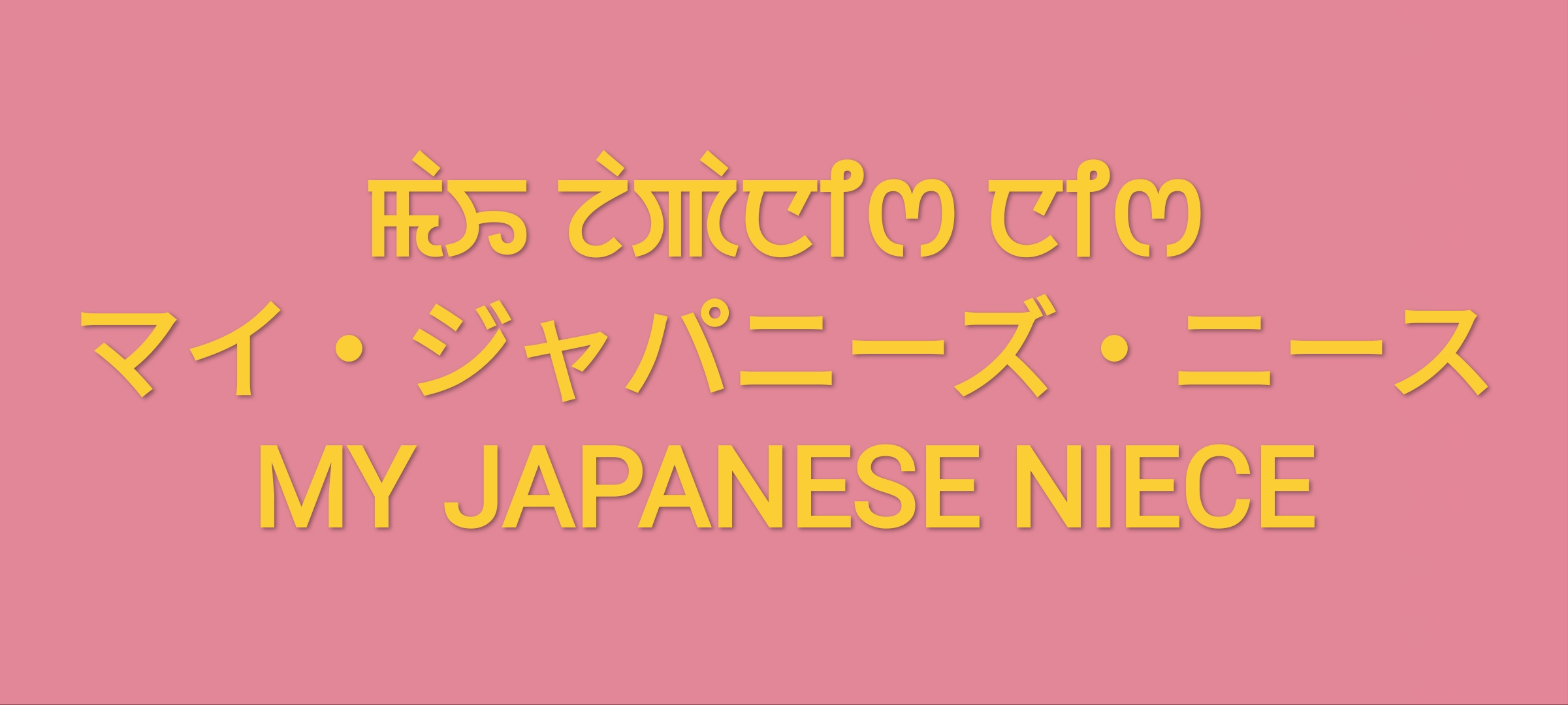
The title "My Japanese Niece" in three languages

The film has three major roles; the Japanese soldier (played by Junichi Kajioka), the Japanese niece named Asada (played by actress Yu Asada) and the adopted daughter.

The film featured 100 soldiers from the Royal Thai Army, who took the roles of World War II Japanese soldiers.

== Plot ==
Asada, a young Japanese lady, comes to Manipur to pay homage to her dead uncle, who died in the Battle of Imphal in 1944. In Manipur, she had a dream. In her dream, her uncle asked her to go to a village. But Asada discovered that a man who looked like her uncle had died a few months back. Asada decided to find out the truth. She discovered about the trials and problems faced by the Japanese soldiers in India. She also discovered many unpublished letters and diaries. Her findings helped her a lot to search for the truth.

== Cast ==
- Junichi Kajioka
- Yu Asada
- Shunsaku Kudo
- Tomoko Hayakawa
- Bala Hijam
- Gokul Athokpam
- Abenao Elangbam
- Kaiku Rajkumar
- Bijou Thaangjam
- Randy Brown
- Wungthingchon Raihing Shimray

== Production ==
"My Japanese Niece" looked into a Japanese army's life after the battle. Director Mohen Naorem was inspired by an earthquake that hit Japan in the year 2011. During the earthquake, the Japanese army played an important role in helping the victims. He believed that the film will expose the humanitarianism of the soldiers in the Battle of Imphal of 1944.

The shooting of the film was done in Bangkok (Thailand), Tokyo (Japan), Manipur (India) and some places of the Indo-Myanmar border.

== See also ==
- Imphal 1944
- National recognition of Meitei culture
- Classicism in Meitei civilization
- Intangible cultural heritage of Meitei civilization
- Women in Meitei civilisation
