= Junichi Kajioka =

Japanese actor and producer

- Occupations: Actor, producer
- Years active: 1988–present
- Website: www.junichikajioka.com

Junichi Kajioka (梶岡潤一, Kajioka Junichi) is a Japanese actor and producer.

== Career ==
Junichi Kajioka started his acting career in 1988 in Tokyo, Japan. He mainly acted in TV dramas, but also performed in the theatre and in musicals. In 1995, he decided to go to Beijing, China, and studied acting at the Central Academy of Drama and script translating at the Beijing Film Academy. He then made his film debut in the 2000 Cannes Film Festival award-winning film Devils on the Doorstep, directed by Jiang Wen. In this film, he played a Japanese sergeant as well as working as a bilingual production assistant, script translator and location interpreter. He has played Japanese soldiers in other Chinese films such as the 69th Golden Globe Awards nomination film The Flowers of War, directed by Zhang Yimou and City of Life and Death, directed by Lu Chuan. In China, he has also played Japanese historical figures in leading roles, such as Monk Fusho in Jianzhen Dongdu, and Yamagata Aritomo in Taiwan 1895. He went to China to study acting and to work in the Chinese film and TV industry as a fluent Mandarin speaker. He is also called Weigang (Chinese: 伟刚; pinyin: Wěigāng) in the Chinese film industry.

He moved to London in 2001 and started his new life. After he learned English, he restarted his acting career. He acts widely in the UK and worldwide. He has recently acted in Universal Pictures 47 Ronin, the first English language adaptation of the Japanese story Chushingura, and "Taking Stock", starring Kelly Brook in the UK. He was nominated for "Best Performance" for "King of Life" at the Thurrock International Film Festival in 2012 and as "Best Actor" for "Phone Box" at the Lakecity International Film Festival in 2013. He has also worked as producer and produced "King of Life" and "Cello". He is currently producing an Indian film "My Japanese Niece" and an American film "Barcode Man", in which he will play the leading roles.

== Filmography ==
- Johnny English Strikes Again as Japanese Diplomat (2018)
- Taking Stock as Yoichi (2014)
- 47 Ronin as Kira's guard (2013)
- The Flowers of War as Japanese machine gun soldier (2011)
- City of Life and Death as Japanese newspaper reporter (2009)
- Devils on the Doorstep as Japanese sergeant (2000)

== Television ==
- Seconds From Disaster as Kyu Sakamoto (2012)
- Taiwan 1895 as Yamagata Aritomo (2008)
- The Day of Kamikaze as Nobuaki Fujita (2008)
- Jianzhen Dongdu as Fusho, Jianzhen's disciple (2007)
