= Jasmine Women =

2004 film directed by Hou Yong

- Theatrical release poster
- Simplified Chinese: 茉莉花开
- Traditional Chinese: 茉莉花開
- Literal meaning: Jasmine Blossoming
- Hanyu Pinyin: Mòlìhuā Kāi
- Directed by: Hou Yong
- Written by: Zhang Xian; Hou Yong
- Based on: Women's Life by Su Tong
- Produced by: Han Sanping; Li Xudong
- Starring: Zhang Ziyi; Joan Chen; Jiang Wen; Lu Yi; Liu Ye
- Cinematography: Yao Xiaofeng
- Edited by: Zhan Haihong
- Music by: Cong Su
- Production companies: Beijing Jinyingma Movie & TV Culture Co.; Century Hero Film Investment Co.; China Film Group Corporation; Wanji Group
- Release dates: June 15, 2004 (SIFF); April 26, 2005 (China)
- Running time: 131 minutes
- Country: China
- Language: Mandarin
- Box office: CN¥5.2 million

Jasmine Women is a 2004 Chinese film directed and co-written by Hou Yong in his directorial debut. The film is an adaptation of Su Tong's novel Women's Life (妇女生活) and depicts the emotionally troubled lives of 4 generations of Shanghainese women from the 1930s to the 1980s. Jasmine Women stars Zhang Ziyi and Joan Chen, who both portrayed multiple characters, as well as Jiang Wen, Lu Yi, and Liu Ye.

The film was well received by critics and was praised for its use of color and the performances of Zhang Ziyi and Joan Chen. The Chinese name of the movie, Mo li hua kai, is based on a popular Chinese song Mo Li Hua, which means "jasmine flower blossom." The names of the characters in the movie are also based on this song.

== Plot ==
The film is divided into three chapters: "grandmother, mother, and daughter"; respectively the story of Mo, Li and Hua.

=== Mo's Story (1930s) ===
Eighteen-year-old Mo (Zhang Ziyi) lives with her mother (Joan Chen) who owns a small photo shop in Shanghai. She longs to become a movie star, a dream her mother does not understand. One day, Mo meets Mr. Meng (Jiang Wen), the boss of a movie studio. She leaves her mother to fulfill her film career dream. She enters a relationship with him who is married and later becomes pregnant. She refuses to have an abortion and when the Second Sino-Japanese War begins, Meng leaves Shanghai and abandons Mo. The movie studio is shut down and Mo returns home. She gives birth to Li and blames her child for everything she has lost. Her mother's boyfriend (never explicitly stated, only implied) also tries to seduce her, using the guise of a free hair appointment. Her mother finds out, and commits suicide not long after.

=== Li's Story (1950s) ===
Li (also played by Zhang Ziyi) had grown up with her mother Mo (now played by Joan Chen) in misery. Mo still remembers her dream of being a movie star. Li marries Zou Jie (Lu Yi) who was a member of her high school's chapter of the Communist Youth League of China. After marriage, they move into Jie's home but unused to their lifestyle and unable to bear a child of her own, they move back to stay with Mo. Li eventually adopts a baby girl named Hua. Li later becomes mentally unstable. Li's situation gets steadily worse and she even accuses Zou for violating Hua, her adopted daughter. Li's family collapses and her husband Zou commits suicide by throwing himself at an oncoming train. Li leaves home; her fate is unknown, and Hua is left to live with Mo.

=== Hua's Story (1980s) ===
Li disappeared when Hua (Zhang Ziyi) was still very young and she grew up with her grandmother Mo (Joan Chen). Mo finds comfort in taking care of her granddaughter. When Hua grew up she married a college graduate, Du (Liu Ye). After marriage, Du went for further studies overseas in Japan and after that, decided to leave Hua. Unfortunately, Hua was already carrying Du's child. Mo strongly encouraged her to abort the baby because of her experiences with having a child and being unprepared for it, but Hua decided against it. Hua decided to check into a family planning clinic/hospital to have an abortion in any case, but before she could arrive home, Mo died. Years later, Du returns to Hua to 'finalise things', but it seems Hua had moved on with her life. Closing scenes show her moving into a new home with her daughter.

== Reception ==
Reviewing the film at the Tokyo International Film Festival, Russell Edwards of Variety described Jasmine Women as a "tearjerker of the first order" and a "visual feast" and writes the film is "an impressive showcase" for actress Zhang Ziyi and Joan Chen "in multiple roles as daughters and mothers across three generations." The review further states the film is "a picture postcard, with the scenes set in pre-WWII Shanghai particularly impressive for their art direction."

== Awards ==
- 7th Shanghai International Film Festival, 2004
  - Grand Jury Prize
  - Golden Goblet (nominated)
- 13th Golden Rooster Awards of China, 2004
  - Best Actress - Zhang Ziyi
  - Best Music - Su Cong, Yin Qing (nominated)
  - Best Sound - Wu Ling (nominated)
