= Hu Die (TV host) =

Chinese television presenter

- Born: February 16, 1983 (age 43); Hanzhong, Shaanxi, China
- Years active: 2005–present
- Known for: CCTV television presenter
- Notable work: The hostess of Morning News and Live News
- Television: Morning News and Live News
- Spouse: Lu Chuan (m. 2015)
- Children: 2

Hu Die (Chinese: 胡蝶; pinyin: Hú Dié; born February 16, 1983), also known as Fang Yuan, is a Chinese television hostess for China Central Television. She is from Hanzhong, Shaanxi, China. In December 2007, she became the winner of CCTV's 5th host contest.

== Career ==
In 2005, Hu Die became a hostess. She hosted program Acting Arama and Golden Days in CCTV-3. In December 2007, she became the winner of CCTV's 5th host contest.

In 2008, she hosted Asia Today and China News in CCTV-4. On July 27, 2009, she began to host Morning News. In March 2009, she hosted the interactive program I have questions to the Premier on CCTV-4 during the NPC and CPPCC.

In December 2012, Hu Die hosted the 2012 CCTV Championship of Internet Motels and Awards Ceremory. In July 2014, she served as a guest of a special program of World Cup of CCTV-5.

In September 2016, she attended CCTV Mid-Autumn Festival Gala. In May 2025, Hu Die referred to the People's Republic of China and Taiwan as separate countries during a live newscast, the footage of which was widely censored.

== Personal life ==
On April 11, 2015, Hu Die married director Lu Chuan in Hawaii. On October 22, 2015, she gave birth to their son. In 2020, their daughter was born.

== Discography ==
Time	Program name	Ref.
2005	Acting Arama, Golden Days	
2008	Asia Today, China News	
2009	Morning News	
2010	Live News	
