= Beijinger in New York =

- Directed by: Zheng Xiaolong; Feng Xiaogang; Ai Weiwei; Li Zhengzheng
- Written by: Glen Cao
- Produced by: China Teleplay Production Center Co., Ltd.
- Starring: Jiang Wen
- Release date: 1994
- Country: China
- Language: Mandarin

A Native of Beijing in New York, also known as Beijinger in New York (simplified Chinese: 北京人在纽约; traditional Chinese: 北京人在紐約; pinyin: Běijīngrén zài Niǔ Yuē), is a novel by Glen Cao (曹桂林), based on his own immigrant story. It was translated into English by Ted Wang (卡本特王). The story follows Qiming Wang and his wife Yan Guo as they work towards the American dream — telling of their immigration, employment, the rearing of their daughter, their eventual success and tragedy — in the foreign environment of the United States. The book was China's #1 best-seller for 1991.

== Success ==
The book was released in Chinese in 1991 and was China's #1 best-seller for that year. In one week alone, over 120,000 copies were sold. The book was subsequently serialized in the Beijing Evening News newspaper, increasing circulation of that paper fivefold. The book was made into a 25 episode television series, which aired on CCTV. It was the first Chinese television program to be filmed in the United States and was directed by Zheng Xiaolong and financed by Paulus Snoeren. The television program was very popular. In 1993, an English version of the book was published and an English version of the television series produced.

Peter Hays Gries, author of Tears of Rage: Chinese Nationalist Reactions to the Belgrade Embassy Bombing, said that the television program had "repeated racist comments about Americans" and "marked the emergence of a popular anti-American sentiment in China".
