= Hidden Man =

2018 Chinese-Hong Kong film by Jiang Wen

- Theatrical release poster

Chinese name
- Traditional Chinese: 邪不壓正
- Simplified Chinese: 邪不压正
Transcriptions
- Directed by: Jiang Wen
- Written by: Jiang Wen; He Jiping; Li Fei; Sun Yue
- Based on: Xia Yin by Zhang Beihai
- Produced by: Zhou Yun
- Starring: Eddie Peng; Liao Fan; Zhou Yun; Xu Qing; Kenya Sawada; Jiang Wen
- Cinematography: Xie Zhengyu
- Edited by: Zhang Qi; Cao Weijie; Jiang Wen
- Music by: Nicolas Errèra
- Production companies: Wuxi Zizai Film and Television Company Limited
- Distributed by: Wuxi Zizai Film and Television Company Limited
- Release date: 13 July 2018 (China)
- Running time: 137 minutes
- Countries: China; Hong Kong
- Language: Mandarin
- Box office: US$85.2 million

Hidden Man (Chinese: 邪不压正) is a 2018 action comedy film co-written and directed by Jiang Wen and starring Eddie Peng, Liao Fan, Jiang Wen, Zhou Yun, and Xu Qing. A Chinese-Hong Kong co-production, the film is an adaptation of Zhang Beihai's wuxia novel Xia Yin. After Let the Bullets Fly and Gone with the Bullets, it completes Jiang Wen's gangster Beiyang trilogy. The film was released on July 13, 2018, in China. It was selected as the Chinese entry for the Best Foreign Language Film at the 91st Academy Awards, but it was not nominated.

== Plot ==
During the Beiyang period, north of Beiping, a young martial artist named Li Tianran witnesses his senior fellow disciple, Zhu Qianlong, colluding with Japanese spy Ichiro Nemoto to massacre their master's entire family. Li narrowly escapes death and is rescued by an American doctor named Hendler. After recovering from his injuries, Li is sent to America, where he studies medicine for years while simultaneously receiving espionage training. In early 1937, Li is suddenly ordered to return to China.

On the eve of the Marco Polo Bridge incident, Beiping is a city crawling with spies from all over the world, a chaotic mix of Chinese and foreigners, rival factions, constant temptations, and lurking dangers. Driven by revenge, Li Tianran has no idea he's being pulled into a grand conspiracy, disrupting a delicate game already in motion. Lan Qingfeng, a mysterious martial artist from the former dynasty, is closely connected to Zhu Qianlong and Ichiro Nemoto. He also shares a deep brotherly bond with Hendler, but whether he is friend or foe remains a mystery.

As tensions between China and Japan escalate, power struggles intensify. Misled by lies and having missed several crucial opportunities, Li Tianran finally makes up his mind to launch a full-scale revenge mission, with the help of a tailor Guan Qiaohong, exposing the truth behind the massacre and the secrets of everyone involved.

== Cast ==
- Eddie Peng as Li Tianran
- Liao Fan as Zhu Qianlong
- Zhou Yun as Guan Qiaohong
- Xu Qing as Tang Fengyi
- Kenya Sawada as Nemoto Ichiro
- Andy Friend as Hendler
- Jiang Wen as Lan Qingfeng
- Yuan Shanshan as Shi Jie
- Ding Jiali as Shi Mu
- Li Meng as Lan Lan
- Junichi Kajioka as Tank squad leader
- Shi Hang as Pan

== Production ==
Wuxi Zizai Film and Television Company Limited bought the film rights to the wuxia novel Xia Yin (Chinese: 侠隐) written by Zhang Beihai.

The film became the third in a trilogy, with two prequels, Let the Bullets Fly (2010) and Gone with the Bullets (2014).

Filming locations included Xi'an, Beijing, and Yunnan.

American actor Kevin Spacey was supposed to appear in a scene, but this was cut after Spacey's sexual assault allegations came to light.

== Release ==
On May 15, 2018, the producers announced that the film was scheduled for release on July 13, 2018. The film premiered in Beijing on July 10 with wide-release in China on July 13. The film earned $17.9 million on opening day, totaling $46.5 million after three days.

== Awards and nominations ==
Award	Category	Recipients	Result
55th Golden Horse Awards	Best Director	Jiang Wen	Nominated
55th Golden Horse Awards	Best Supporting Actress	Xu Qing	Nominated
55th Golden Horse Awards	Best Visual Effects	Wang Shaoshuai and Yang Yuejuan	Nominated
55th Golden Horse Awards	Best Art Direction	Liu Qing	Nominated
55th Golden Horse Awards	Best Makeup & Costume Design	Dong Zhongmin, Uma Wang and Zhang Shuping	Nominated
55th Golden Horse Awards	Best Action Choreography	He Jun, Kenji Tanigaki and Yan Hua	Won
38th Hong Kong Film Awards	Best Film from Mainland and Taiwan	Hidden Man	Nominated
13th Asian Film Awards	Best Supporting Actress	Xu Qing	Nominated
13th Asian Film Awards	Best Costume Design	Dong Zhongmin, Uma Wang and Zhang Shuping	Nominated
13th Asian Film Awards	Best Visual Effects	Wang Shaoshuai and Yang Yuejuan	Nominated
13th Asian Film Awards	Best Production Design	Liu Qing	Nominated

== Reception ==
Variety called the film a "good-looking but convoluted period romp."

== See also ==
- List of submissions to the 91st Academy Awards for Best Foreign Language Film
- List of Chinese submissions for the Academy Award for Best Foreign Language Film
