= Gone with the Bullets =

2014 Chinese-American-Hong Kong film by Jiang Wen

- Gone with the Bullets theatrical poster
- Traditional Chinese: 一步之遙
- Simplified Chinese: 一步之遥
- Literal meaning: A step too far
- Hanyu Pinyin: Yībù zhī yáo
- Directed by: Jiang Wen
- Written by: Jiang Wen; Guo Junli; Wang Shuo; Liao Yimei; Shu Ping; Yan Yunfei; Sun Yu; Sun Rui; Yu Yanlin
- Produced by: Ma Ke; Albert Lee; Yin Hongbo; Li Yansong; Qiao Ling; Zhao Feng; Zhao Haifeng
- Starring: Jiang Wen; Ge You; Zhou Yun; Shu Qi
- Cinematography: Xie Zhengyu; Li Qiang
- Edited by: Jiang Wen; Zhang Qi; Cao Weijie; Cui Zixiong; Jiang Jiashuang; Zheng Ting; Zhang Yifan; Zhou Yue
- Production companies: China Film Co-Production Corp.; JCE Movies Limited; Columbia Pictures; CP Film Production Asia
- Distributed by: China Film Group Corporation
- Release date: December 18, 2014 (China)
- Running time: 140 minutes 118 minutes (International)
- Countries: China; United States; Hong Kong
- Language: Mandarin
- Budget: 300 million yuan (US$48.8 million)
- Box office: US$83.33 million

Gone with the Bullets (Chinese: 一步之遥) is a 2014 action comedy film directed by Jiang Wen. The film is co-produced by China, United States, and Hong Kong. It stars Jiang, Ge You, Zhou Yun and Shu Qi. Production started on location in Beijing at the China Film Group studio in Huairou on October 2, 2013. Production wrapped before the Chinese New Year holiday. The film was released on December 18, 2014. A version, which was 22 minutes shorter, was screened in the main competition section of the 65th Berlin International Film Festival.

This film is the second part of Jiang Wen's gangster Beiyang trilogy with Let the Bullets Fly and Hidden Man.

The film was named 2014's "smokiest movie" by an anti-smoking group in China, as it had 45 scenes featuring smoking.

== Plot ==
During the period of the Beiyang Government, in the French Concession of Shanghai, Ma Zouri and Chinese police inspector Xiang Feitian organized the "Flower Nation Beauty Pageant" (a beauty contest for sex workers) to help General Wu's son, Wu Qi, launder money. The event attracted contestants from various countries and drew widespread public attention. In the final round, three contestants competed. Under the manipulation of Ma Zouri and Xiang Feitian, the former champion courtesan, Wan Yanying, who promised onstage to auction off her right to marriage and donate all her wealth, ultimately won the crown. During a date with Wan Yanying, Ma Zouri was pressured into marriage. When he refused, she pulled a gun on him. The two ended up smoking opium and going for a drive, but the car flipped in the countryside, causing Wan Yanying's accidental and tragic death. Ma Zouri fled the scene.

As media reports on Wan Yanying's death circulated, Ma Zouri became a prime suspect in the public eye and was wanted by the police. He sought help from General Wu. At the Wu residence, Ma Zouri encountered his childhood teacher, now the General's wife, Qin Sainan, and his former lover, Wu Liu, General Wu's daughter. There, he discovered that Xiang Feitian had been punished by General Wu for visiting prostitutes with Wu Qi. To save Xiang Feitian, Ma Zouri suggested a peculiar game involving touching the ground with both hands, which succeeded in sparing Xiang's life. However, Ma Zouri later realized his main goal hadn't been achieved and that he was still in grave danger. Meanwhile, the ungrateful Xiang Feitian turned on him and started hunting Ma Zouri's whereabouts. During Ma Zouri's two years on the run, theater troupes led by Wang Tianwang adapted his story into plays and even a movie titled Execution of Ma Zouri. In these dramatizations, he was depicted as a ruthless criminal who killed for money.

Unable to tolerate the disgraceful portrayal of his character, Ma Zouri confronted Wang Tianwang in disguise, trying to bribe and threaten him into stopping the performances. But Wang Tianwang refused. Eventually, Ma Zouri struck him at a live performance and was arrested by police lying in wait. After his arrest, Wu Liu talked to him and began to believe he had been wronged, growing sympathetic to his plight. On the other hand, Wu Qi and Xiang Feitian remained convinced he was a murderer and urged General Wu to have Ma Zouri executed to quell public outrage and boost his authority. Wu Liu, now deeply in love with Ma Zouri, clashed bitterly with her mother.

On the night General Wu married a Russian aristocrat as his concubine, Wu Liu and her father performed a foreign opera for the guests. Later, Wu Liu secretly freed Ma Zouri and fled with him in a car. General Wu and his entourage gave chase. During the pursuit, Wu Liu even exchanged gunfire with her mother to shoot the loudspeaker mounted on the pursuing vehicle. Ma Zouri and Wu Liu eventually took shelter in a windmill house. To prevent Wu Liu from ending up like the tragic Wan Yanying, Ma Zouri knocked her unconscious and surrendered himself. Facing a crowd of newlyweds attending a wedding outside, he confessed to causing Wan Yanying's death and claimed Wu Liu had been kidnapped. In a long speech recounting how he had been misunderstood and demonized by society, he was shot multiple times and ultimately died.

The story ends with a fantasy sequence imagined by Wu Liu: she is at a train station, bidding a tearful farewell to Ma Zouri as he departs on a train.

== Cast ==
- Jiang Wen as Ma Zouri
- Ge You as Xiang Feitian
- Zhou Yun as Wu Liu
- Shu Qi as Wan Yanying
- Wen Zhang as Wu Qi
- Wang Zhiwen as Wang Tianwang
- Hung Huang as Qin Sainan
- Harrison Liu as General Wu
- Na Ying as Shu Wangou (Swan girl)
- Liu Sola
- Niu Ben

== Box office ==
By January 9, 2015, the film had earned ¥511.14 million at the Chinese box office.
