= Zhou Yun =

Chinese actress (born 1978)

- 周韵
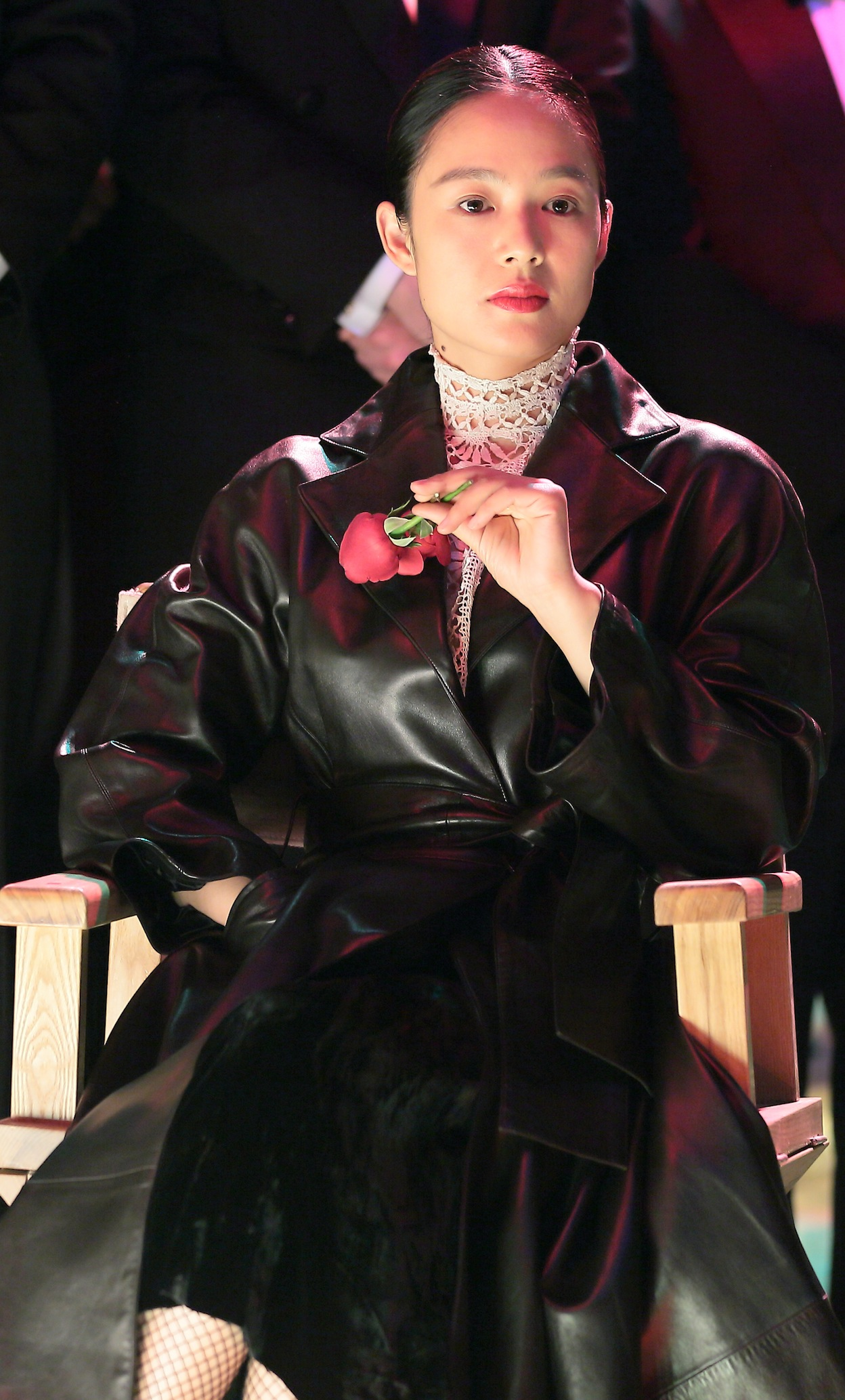
- Zhou Yun in 2014.
- Born: 17 December 1978 (age 47); Wenzhou, Zhejiang, China
- Other name: Zhou Sila (周斯拉)
- Education: Central Academy of Drama
- Occupation: Actress
- Years active: 2000–present
- Spouse: Jiang Wen (m. 2005)
- Children: 2

Chinese name
- Traditional Chinese: 周韻
- Simplified Chinese: 周韵
Transcriptions
Standard Mandarin
- Hanyu Pinyin: Zhōu Yún

Zhou Yun (Chinese: 周韵; born 17 December 1978) is a Chinese actress.

Zhou is noted for her roles as Hua Jie and Shu Man in the film and television series Let the Bullets Fly and Golden Marriage 2 respectively.

== Life ==
=== Early life ===
Zhou was born in a merchant family in Wenzhou, Zhejiang, she was raised by her grandmother. At the age of 15, Zhou attended the Miss Wenzhou pageant and won the competition. Zhou graduated from Central Academy of Drama, where she majored in acting.

=== Acting career ===
Zhou's first film role was uncredited appearance in the film Love Season (2000).

In 2003, Zhou had a cameo appearance in Warriors of Heaven and Earth - an action film starring Zhao Wei, Jiang Wen and Kiichi Nakai - where she played the role of the male Buddhist monk. She shaved her head for the role. She would later marry its star, Jiang Wen.

In 2007, Zhou appeared in The Sun Also Rises, a Chinese film directed, produced and co-written by Jiang Wen starring Joan Chen, Anthony Wong, Jaycee Chan, and Jiang Wen.

In 2009, Zhou participated as A Chun in Bodyguards and Assassins, which grossed over US$5,837,674 on a budget of only US$23 million.

After playing minor roles in various films and television series, Zhou received her first leading role in a series called Golden Marriage 2, for which she received nominations at the 6th Huading Awards and won Best Actress Award at the Asia Rainbow TV Awards. That same year, Zhou co-starred with Chow Yun-fat and Jiang Wen in the 2008 film Let the Bullets Fly as Hua Jie. She received positive reviews.

In 2014, two films she headlined Gone with the Bullets and The Assassin.

== Personal life ==
Zhou married Jiang Wen, a noted actor in China, their son was born on September 19, 2006.

== Filmography ==
=== Film ===
Year	English title	Chinese title	Role	Notes
2000	Love Season	恋爱季节	Zhao Fang	
2003	Warriors of Heaven and Earth	天地英雄	Jue Hui	
2003	Peach Blossoming	桃花灿烂	Xingzi	
2007	The Sun Also Rises	太阳照常升起	Feng Ma	
2009	Bodyguards and Assassins	十月围城	A Chun	
2010	Let the Bullets Fly	让子弹飞	Hua Jie	
2014	Gone with the Bullets	一步之遥		
2014	The Assassin	聂隐娘	Jing Jing'er	
2018	Hidden Man	邪不压正	Guan Qiaohong	

=== Television ===
Year	English title	Chinese title	Role	Notes
2000		堆积情感	Chen Jie	
2002	Passing Happiness	走过幸福	Zhu Xiaobei	
2002		各就各位	Rourou	
2003	Tibet Police	西藏警察	Cai Lanjing	
2005	You Are the Apple I Am the Pear	你是苹果我是梨	Tang Hong	
2005		月上海	Ren Yusun	
2005		爱上单眼皮男生	Song Shiyi	
2005	My Brothers and Sisters	我的兄弟姐妹	Qi Miao	
2010	Golden Marriage 2	金婚风雨情	Shu Man	

== Awards ==
Year	Work	Award	Result	Notes
2007		BQ Celebrity Score Award for Most Artistic Actress	Won	
2007		BQ Celebrity Score Award for Favorite Actress	Nominated	
2007		BQ Celebrity Score Award for Sweet Couple	Nominated	
2007		China Fashion Award for Most Potential Actress	Won	
2009		BQ Celebrity Score Award for Favorite Actress	Nominated	
2010		BQ Celebrity Score Award for Most Charming Actress	Won	
2010		Sohu Internet TV Festival – Most Charming Actress	Nominated	
2011	Golden Marriage 2	6th Huading Award for Best TV Actress	Nominated	
2011	Golden Marriage 2	6th Huading Award for Favorite Star	Nominated	
2011	Golden Marriage 2	Asia Rainbow TV Award for Best Actress	Won	
2011		BQ Celebrity Score Award for Favorite Actress	Nominated	
2011		China TV Audience Festival - Favorite Artist	Nominated	
2012	Golden Marriage 2	Golden Eagle Awards for Favorite Actress	Nominated	
