= Glen Cao =

American author

Glen Cao (born 1947) is also known by his Chinese name, Cao Guilin (曹桂林). He is the author of Beijinger in New York. Mr. Cao wrote the book largely based on his own life experiences as an immigrant to New York City from Beijing in 1980. The novel sold millions of copies in China and went on to become serialized in a news paper, and then subsequently made into a TV series, aired on CCTV. He is also the founder of C & J Knitwear Company. He is married to director Ying Yeh (英业).
