= The Missing Gun =

- Promotional poster for The Missing Gun
- Directed by: Lu Chuan
- Written by: Lu Chuan
- Based on: a novelette by Fan Yiping
- Produced by: Wang Zhonglei
- Starring: Jiang Wen; Ning Jing; Wu Yujuan
- Cinematography: Xie Zhengyu
- Music by: Fei Ling
- Distributed by: China Film Group Corporation; Columbia Pictures Film Productions Asia
- Release dates: 8 May 2002 (China); 31 October 2002 (Australia)
- Running time: 87 min.
- Country: China
- Language: Guizhou dialect

The Missing Gun (Chinese: 寻枪; pinyin: Xún Qiāng) is a 2002 Chinese black comedy film directed by Lu Chuan and starring Jiang Wen, Ning Jing and Wu Yujuan. A directorial debut of Lu, the film premiered during the 9th Beijing College Student Film Festival on 21 April 2002. A pioneer digital screening was subsequently held in Shanghai on 28 April, making The Missing Gun the first film screened in China with digital cinema technology."The Missing Gun" is China's first digital movie which used the GDC's DSR digital cinema system. The film was officially released on 8 May in Beijing.

Adapted from a novelette by Fan Yiping, the film revolves around a small-town policeman who embarks on a search for his missing gun. The film also explores the themes of self-identity and self-respect, as well as addresses a number of pertinent social issues, such as counterfeits, in China.

== Plot ==
War veteran turned small-town policeman Ma Shan (played by Jiang Wen) wakes up after a drunken night at his sister's wedding banquet to find his issued gun missing. After making sure his wife Han Xiaoyun (Wu Yujuan) and third-grader son have not taken it, Ma embarks on a search around the town. He questions his sister and brother-in-law, as well as two ex-comrades in an attempt to connect the dots. He finds out that he was sent home the previous night in a car by Zhou Xiaogang (Shi Liang). Ma knocks on Zhou's door but is greeted by Li Xiaomeng (Ning Jing), Ma's former lover who married and moved to Guangzhou, but has since returned. Li claims that Zhou is not home. Ma leaves but manages to run into Zhou a moment later. After searching Zhou's car, he ascertains that Zhou has not taken his gun either.

Ma is left with no choice but to report the missing gun to his superiors. He is stripped of his uniform but is allowed to continue the search on his own. During his search, Ma comes across a thief who has snatched a woman's handbag and gives chase. The desperate thief, seeing no escape, pulls out a gun. Mistaking the gun for his own, Ma refuses to back down. The thief fires, only to reveal that the gun he holds is a fake.

Meanwhile, a murder has taken place in town. A man has sneaked into Zhou's home and shoots Li with the missing gun. Upon interrogation, Zhou insists that he was not the intended target. However, Ma investigates on his own and reveals that Zhou runs an underground factory which produces counterfeit wine. Ma then retains Zhou, exchanges clothes with him, and boards a bus heading out of town. True to his prediction, the criminal trails Ma, thinking that he is Zhou, shoots him from behind at the railway station but fails to kill him instantly. As the criminal approaches to confirm his kill, Ma turns over and locks the two of them together with his handcuffs.

The criminal turns out to be Stammer Liu, a local bricklayer whose family was poisoned from drinking Zhou's illicit wine. Liu begs Ma to let him go to avenge his family but Ma refuses. Ma then draws out the fake gun he confiscated from the thief and Liu, in fear, fires and spends the last bullet. Ma bleeds profusely and feels faint, lying on the ground. The police arrive, and as they rush over to apprehend Liu, Ma—or his hallucination—is shown to suddenly stand up and walk away with his recovered gun, apparently unhurt and laughing (or perhaps crying) at finding his lost weapon. The film ends with a freeze frame.

== Cast ==
- Jiang Wen as Ma Shan, a smalltown policeman who wakes up one day to find his gun missing
- Ning Jing as Li Xiaomeng, a resident of the town, Ma's first love
- Wu Yujuan as Han Xiaoyun, Ma's wife, a teacher at a local school
- Shi Liang as Zhou Xiaogang, a local businessman

== Reception ==
The Missing Gun first premiered during the Beijing College Student Film Festival on 21 April 2002, where it clinched the award for Best Debut Film. A pioneer digital screening was then held in Shanghai on 28 April, marking the first use of digital cinema in China. After its official release in Beijing on 8 May, the film recorded more than ¥1 million in box office within a week of release, topping The Lord of the Rings: The Fellowship of the Ring. It was subsequently selected for the 59th Venice Film Festival, though it failed to clinch any awards.

The film drew criticism from the Chinese National Language and Character Committee for using the Guizhou dialect instead of Standard Chinese. The committee's director Yuan Guiren disapproved Jiang Wen's selection of dialects as language media for two consecutive films (the previous being Devils on the Doorstep), claiming that such a choice misguides the audience on the importance of learning Standard Chinese, a standard adopted by the Chinese government.

=== Awards and nominations ===
- Beijing College Student Film Festival, 2002
  - Best Directorial Debut
- Golden Trailer Awards, 2003
  - Best Foreign Film (nominated)

== DVD release ==
A DVD featuring subtitles in English, Spanish, French and Portuguese was released on 4 May 2004 and distributed by Sony Pictures Entertainment in North America.
