= The Sun Also Rises (2007 film) =

2007 Chinese-Hong Kong film by Jiang Wen

- Poster for The Sun Also Rises
- Traditional Chinese: 太陽照常升起
- Simplified Chinese: 太阳照常升起
- Hanyu Pinyin: tài yáng zhào cháng shēng qǐ
- Directed by: Jiang Wen
- Written by: Jiang Wen; Shu Ping; Guo Shixing; Ye Mi
- Produced by: Jiang Wen; Albert Lee
- Starring: Jaycee Chan; Joan Chen; Jiang Wen; Anthony Wong; Zhou Yun
- Cinematography: Pin Bing Lee; Yang Tao; Zhao Fei
- Edited by: Zhang Yifan
- Music by: Joe Hisaishi
- Production companies: Emperor Motion Pictures; Poly Bona
- Distributed by: Emperor Motion Pictures (Hong Kong and international); Beijing Buyilehu Films (China); Beijing Taihe Film (China)
- Release dates: 3 September 2007 (Venice); 20 September 2007 (Hong Kong); 21 September 2007 (China)
- Running time: 116 minutes
- Countries: China; Hong Kong
- Language: Mandarin

The Sun Also Rises (Chinese: 太阳照常升起) is a 2007 film directed, produced and co-written by Jiang Wen. A Chinese-Hong Kong co-production, it stars Joan Chen, Anthony Wong, Jaycee Chan, and Jiang himself. This movie is the polyptych of interconnected stories in different time-zones, shifting between a Yunnan village, a campus, and the Gobi Desert.

The film was screened in competition at the Venice International Film Festival and nominated for Golden Lion, but lost to Ang Lee's historical thriller Lust, Caution. It also premiered at the 2007 Toronto International Film Festival on 9 September, and was nominated for Achievement in Cinematography at the 2007 Asia Pacific Screen Awards. It was theatrically released in Hong Kong on 20 September 2007.

== Plot ==
The movie details four interconnected stories.

In the first story, madness and mischief reign as a single mother (Zhou Yun) drives her devoted son (Jaycee Chan) to distraction with her daredevil antics in pursuit of tranquility. The agile mom climbs tall trees and stands astride a small earthen raft on the river. She treasures a beautiful pair of slippers that she is forever losing, and the son fears that, one day, the footwear will remain while his mother disappears.

In the second story, on a college campus, two old friends find their friendship tested by rivalry over a woman. Doctor Lin (Joan Chen) is the mistress of Old Tang (Jiang Wen), but she finds herself drawn to a teacher named Liang (Anthony Wong). When Liang is accused of groping women at a campus gathering, Lin offers her rear end behind a curtain to determine whose was the guilty hand.

In the third story, Old Tang, who is a hunter, has a young wife (Kong Wei) who begins a relationship with the madwoman's son. One day, Tang overhears their noises of passion and his wife whispering that her husband says her belly is like velvet. He is determined to shoot the young man, but is taken aback when the boy asks him, "What is velvet?"

The final episode involves all the characters in a dreamlike sequence that brings their lives full circle.

== Cast ==
- Jiang Wen as Old Tang
- Joan Chen as Doctor Lin
- Zhou Yun as Mad Mother
- Jaycee Chan as The Son
- Anthony Wong as Teacher Liang
- Kong Wei as Tang's Wife

== Reviews ==
The film received mostly positive reviews from critics, despite its mediocre commercial reception. Writers at the 2007 Toronto International Film Festival mentioned "a new aesthetic of magical realism, Jiang deftly defies the gravity of linear storytelling to produce sheer visual poetry. This gallery of lavishly composed frames may seem to follow an irrational logic but, in the end, the imagery is as rare and precious as velvet was scarce in the isolated China the film so vividly depicts." Ray Bennett of The Hollywood Reporter wrote "Fluid motion and glorious colors provide a visual treat in Jiang Wen's sumptuous romantic fantasy... besides being wonderful to look at, The Sun Also Rises is great fun, with sure-handed performances." Moreover, the film was rumored to be China's official entries to the 2008 Oscars bidding with Lust, Caution and The Warlords.

Critic and filmmaker Bilge Ebiri, however, described it as perhaps "one of the strangest pictures I've ever seen" and found it increasingly "more frenetic and absurd", despite acknowledging a "stylish delirium" near the end. Writing in Muse Magazine, Perry Lam also gave a negative review, criticizing "Jiang's timidity and the small-mindedness of his new movie."
