= Devils on the Doorstep =

- American poster for Devils on the Doorstep
- Directed by: Jiang Wen
- Screenplay by: Shu Ping; Shi Jianquan; Jiang Wen; You Fengwei
- Based on: Survival by You Fengwei
- Produced by: Jiang Wen; Dong Ping; Yang Hongguang; Liu Xiaodian; Liu Xiaodong
- Starring: Jiang Wen; Kagawa Teruyuki; Yuan Ding; Jiang Hongbo
- Cinematography: Gu Changwei
- Edited by: Zhang Yifan; Folmer Wiesinger
- Music by: Cui Jian; Liu Xing; Li Haiying
- Release dates: 12 May 2000 (Cannes); 27 April 2002
- Running time: 139 minutes
- Country: China
- Languages: Mandarin; Japanese
- Budget: US$3.9 million US$2.6 million

Devils on the Doorstep (simplified Chinese: 鬼子来了; traditional Chinese: 鬼子來了; Japanese: 鬼が来た!; literally "the devils are here"; the devil is a term of abuse for foreign invaders, here referring to brutal and violent Japanese invaders in China during World War II) is a 2000 Chinese black comedy war film directed, co-written and produced by Jiang Wen, starring Jiang himself, Kagawa Teruyuki, Yuan Ding and Jiang Hongbo. Shot in black and white to mimic old-time war movies, the film premiered at the 2000 Cannes Film Festival on 12 May where it won the Grand Prix. The film was initially not allowed to be shown in theaters in its native China for a certain period but has eventually been made commercially available there since.

The story takes place in a small remote village named Guajiatai (or Rack Armor Terrace) near Shanhaiguan, Hebei at the end of the Second Sino-Japanese War. One night, a mysterious man brings two captives in sacks (Japanese soldier Teruyuki and translator Dong Hanchen) to the doorstep of a peasant's (Ma Dasan) home and threatens Ma to keep them until he returns to pick them up on New Year's Eve. Fearing both the mystery man and the Japanese, the whole village falls into a dilemma over what to do with the two prisoners.

The film is inspired by the novel Survival by You Fengwei, and was greatly modified during the process of adaptation. This film shelved the theme of "the brave resistance against Japanese aggression" in the original literature, and focused on the themes of "the ignorance of the peasants" and "the absurdity of the war." Contrary to its title, Devils on the Doorstep is not at its core an anti-Japanese war film. In Jiang's own words, the film shows how Chinese literature and film has perpetuated an attitude of blaming the aggressor and casting the Chinese population as passive victims of aggression. Jiang hoped that the film illuminates this common human psychological trait of blaming others for disaster that goes beyond China.

== Plot ==
In a small village named Rack-Armor Terrace in Hebei, at the foot of the Great Wall of China, a local peasant called Ma Dasan is caught by surprise when a man bursts into his home one night and deposits two men in gunnysacks, instructing him at gunpoint to keep them captive but alive for the next few days and interrogate them. The man, identified only as "Me", leaves before Ma can catch a glimpse of him. One of the gunnysacks contains Kosaburo Hanaya, a belligerent Japanese sergeant; the other Dong Hanchen, an obsequious Chinese interpreter working for the Japanese Army. Ma hurriedly enlists the help of his fellow villagers. Fearing both the mysterious "Me" and the Japanese, the village decides to follow the instructions from "Me" and detains the prisoners in Ma's cellar. Hanaya repeatedly attempts to provoke the peasants into killing him, but Dong, fearing for his own life, alters Hanaya's words in translation to make him appear conciliatory.

The mystery man fails to return by the eve of Chinese New Year as promised. Six months later, the villagers finally run out of patience and resolve to kill the prisoners. The task falls on Ma after a drawing of lots. Not daring to commit murder, Ma instead hides the prisoners in a watchtower along the Great Wall, where he visits them regularly to bring them food and water. However, an unsuccessful escape attempt by the prisoners reveals Ma's secret to the rest of the village. A bitter argument ensues and the village decides to hire an assassin from town to carry out the deed. Ma enlists the help of an old man known as One Stroke Liu, a former Imperial executioner. He is told that being beheaded by Liu feels like a passing breeze, and that the severed head will roll nine times on the ground, blink three times, and smile in a gesture of gratitude for such a painless death. However, Liu fails to harm either prisoner with one stroke. Claiming that it is the will of Heaven, Liu leaves with the prisoners uninjured.

By this time, however, Hanaya has lost all his defiance and is filled only with gratitude towards the villagers. He promises to reward the village with two wagons of grain should he be released. The villagers agree and return the prisoners to the Japanese Army encampment in the nearby town. However, the Japanese Army has already made Hanaya a war hero, believing that he was killed in battle. Returning alive after being a prisoner shames the Army. The commander of the encampment, Captain Inokichi Sakatsuka, gives Hanaya a merciless beating but feels honor-bound to fulfill the agreement between the latter and the village. Captain Sakatsuka and his men bring a great bounty of food and wine to the village and hold a feast there that evening, as Ma goes off to fetch his lover Yu'er from a neighboring village. During the feast, Captain Sakatsuka demands to have the man who captured Hanaya. He also accuses Ma of sneaking off to fetch resistance fighters. Not given a satisfactory answer, he orders all villagers to be killed and the village to be burned. Ma and Yu'er return on a raft only to find the entire village in flames. Meanwhile, Hanaya is about to commit harakiri before being stopped by Captain Sakatsuka and informed that Japan has recently surrendered, and the war is over.

After the Chinese National Revolutionary Army takes back the area, Dong is publicly executed for collaborating with the enemy. Ma, bent on revenge, disguises himself as a cigarette vendor and loiters outside the Japanese encampment, now converted into a POW camp. When two Japanese soldiers come out to buy cigarettes, Ma hacks them with an axe and breaks into the camp, killing more POWs. He finds and pursues Hanaya, but is brought down by guards before he can kill the latter. Major Gao, commander of the Chinese Army contingent administering the town, condemns Ma's act as too despicable to deserve death by the hands of a Chinese soldier, and instead orders a Japanese POW to carry out the execution before a massive crowd. Captain Sakatsuka hands a katana to Hanaya, who takes careful aim before delivering the fatal strike. As Ma's head falls to the ground, it rolls nine times, blinks three times, and smiles, just as 'One Strike' Liu's victims were supposed to have done.

== Cast ==
- Jiang Wen (姜文) as Ma Dasan, a local peasant from the village of Rack-Armor Terrace who is threatened into keeping two prisoners (Kosaburo Hanaya and Dong Hanchen) until New Year's Eve.
- Kagawa Teruyuki (香川照之) as Kosaburo Hanaya, a hostile Japanese Army sergeant held captive by Ma Dasan.
- Yuan Ding (袁丁) as Dong Hanchen, a nervous Chinese interpreter working for the Japanese Army and held captive by Ma Dasan.
- Jiang Hongbo (姜宏波) as Yu'er, a widow from Rack-Armor Terrace and lover of Ma. She is pregnant with Ma Dasan's child, who was conceived the night the prisoners arrived at their house.
- Kenya Sawada (澤田 拳也) as Captain Inokichi Sakatsuka, the commander of a company of Japanese soldiers encamped near Rack-Armor Terrace.
- David Wu (simplified Chinese: 吴大维; Traditional Chinese: 吳大維) as Major Gao, commander of a National Revolutionary Army battalion administering the area after the Japanese surrender.
- Zhijun Cong as Grandfather.
- Zi Xi (曦子) as Liu Wang, a peasant from the village of Rack-Armor Terrance.
- Haibin Li as “Me”, the man who forces Ma Dasan to hold two prisoners (Kosaburo Hanaya and Dong Hanchen) hostage.
- Weidong Cai as Er Bozi, a peasant from the village of Rack-Armor Terrance and Auntie's son.
- Lianmei Chen (simplified Chinese: 陈莲梅; traditional Chinese: 陈莲梅) as Auntie, Er Bozi's mother.
- Yoshimoto Miyaji as Koji Nonomura.
- Chen Qiang (陈强) as 'One-Stroke' Liu, a renowned executioner who Ma Dasan is introduced to but later turns out to be a fraud.

== Theme ==
=== Historical background ===
The film is a war drama with a dark sense of humor about the Japanese Invasion of China during World War II. It shows the brutality of war and how it affects the Chinese people. The events of Devils on the Doorstep take place in the last few years of the Second Sino-Japanese War. While the story is fiction, it is set during the events of 1944-1945 and the final moments leading up to Japan's surrender, marking the end of World War II and the Second Sino-Japanese War. The film takes a different approach in comparison to other Chinese cinema, which traditionally is anti-Japanese and contains the Chinese hero narrative. The opening invasion of China by the Japanese and the atrocity that was the Nanjing Massacre created even stronger anti-Japanese sentiments that progressively grew stronger as the war continued on. The timeline of the film matches up accurately with history; the execution of Ma Dasan, portrayed by Jiang Wen, lines up with the announcement of the surrender of Japan on August 15, 1945, by the Japanese Emperor Hirohito. This makes the death of Ma all the more ironic; a great victory for the world and China is in fact the day Ma dies at the hands of the Japanese prisoners of war in a cruel twist of fate. A couple weeks later, on September 2, 1945, the official surrender was signed and World War II was officially over.

The film's portrayal and depictions of both the Chinese and the Japanese resulted in its fair share of controversies, with many from either side unhappy with how their country was presented. Its international success saw the censorship of Devils on the Doorstep in China by the People's Republic of China officials after director Jiang Wen refused to cut and edit scenes out of the film. Despite its controversies, the film went on to win a couple of minor awards in Japan in 2003.

=== Director's intention ===
In an interview, Jiang Wen explained the reason why he made Devils On The Doorstep. The film not only reproduces the atrocities committed by the Japanese army during the time in which it was set, but also acts as a warning. In the film, the Japanese army massacres many Chinese people. Such a tragedy once happened in Jiang Wen's hometown Tangshan. By making the film, Jiang wanted both Chinese and Japanese audiences to face history.

According to director Jiang Wen, Ma is initially very fearful but does not know the origins of his fear. The turning point comes when he sees his village in flames and his fellow villagers massacred. He then overcomes his own fear and begins longing for death. In the final scene, Ma dies a satisfying death as he has fulfilled his desire.

== Production ==
=== Adaptation ===
The film was inspired by and loosely based on a novel titled Survival by You Fengwei. Devils on the Doorstep retained the central characters' relationships and story frame of Survival. However, the final screenplay was largely original, with only a few similarities to You's novel. Because Jiang Wen and You Fengwei had different views about national character, this film set aside the theme of military-civilian resistance in the original work. The villagers took care of the Japanese prisoners, but the Japanese soldiers slaughtered them. It ruthlessly exposed the hidden character of the Chinese people's ignorance, numbness, servility and selfishness. This movie also embodies the Japanese national essence and Bushido spirit. They were merciless and cruel when they massacred the villagers, but obedient and humble after surrendering.

Director Jiang Wen and director of photography Gu Changwei chose to shoot the film in black and white to capture the details of the historical era depicted in the movie. Jiang Wen believed that the entire black and white film paved the way for the last few color shots. There were initial worries about the sales and distribution prospects for a black-and-white film, but the production eventually went ahead.

=== Budget and casting ===
An executive director from Beijing Zhongbo Times Film Planning, one of the three investors in the film, said in an interview that the total expenditure on the film approached US$3.9 million, way above the original budget, which he did not specify. Later, however, a general manager from the same company told a reporter that the initial budget was US$2 million, but the final expenditure exceeded this number by over 30 percent.

The Japanese cast members in the film, two of whom came to know Jiang while on exchange in the Central Academy of Drama in the 1980s, initially expressed concerns with the Japanese war crimes depicted in the film. Jiang spent two weeks discussing the issue with them, and showed them documentaries about the war, including some made by Japanese filmmakers. According to Jiang, the Japanese cast members eventually came to trust him. Jiang also used many non-professional actors and actresses in the film, some of whom were also members of the crew. Jiang himself also played the leading role in the film, which he admitted was a tiring experience. He said he also came to distrust what most of the crew members said about his acting, especially when they were tired and wanting to finish for the day.

=== Cinematography ===
Though it was released in 2000, Devils on the Doorstep is filmed almost entirely in black and white — except for the last four minutes, during which Ma is executed. As his head rolls to the ground, the cinematography not only changes from black and white to color, but the camera perspective also shifts from a neutral third-person point-of-view to the first-person perspective of Ma's severed head. In an interview, director Jiang Wen explained that the reason for filming in black and white was to mimic the nature of historic photographs and make the film indistinguishable from its counterparts made before the advent of color cinematography. Monochrome cinematography also contrasts with the artificiality of the bright colors characteristic of Fifth Generation Chinese cinema.

Devils on the Doorstep often alternates between extreme long shots and close-ups. These long shots, contrasted with extreme close-ups that fiercely frame characters' faces yet exclude the object of their gaze, or focus on details such as a pair of military boots, a sword or other mundane objects, create a fragmented vision that reflects the protagonists’ confusion. This type of cinematography can be compared to the style of a detached documentary that intends to lead viewers to comment on the images they are seeing rather than hook viewers with strong emotions. In the early scenes of the film, hand-held cameras are used to accentuate certain comic episodes, one of which includes a scene where two Japanese soldiers chase a chicken into Ma Dasan's courtyard. The scene plays out chaotically as Ma desperately tries to keep the soldiers away from the outer room where the two prisoners are being held. A hand-held camera is also used for a more somber effect at the end of the film when the massacre of the villagers is shown. To contrast, the films’ use of camera is much more subtle in the many interior shots in the early part of the film.

Much of the film is in darkness with a single light source and in confined space.

== Release and reception ==
=== Cannes release and cutting ===
The version shown at the 2000 Cannes Film Festival was three hours long. This was a working version that was later cut to 139 minutes with director Jiang Wen's full participation in order to enhance the film's commercial prospects and to tighten the storyline, which he did not have time to do before the Cannes premier.

The film was booked for showing on 3 November 2014 at the Cornerhouse Manchester (UK) as part of Asia Triennial Manchester 14, and a 161-minute version arrived, somewhat to the organizers' surprise. The film was well received at this screening.

=== Temporary ban in China ===
Time Asia reported that the Chinese Film Bureau was furious at Jiang for having entered the film in the Cannes Film Festival without its permission. The Film Bureau reportedly sent two officials to Cannes to try to dissuade the festival from screening Devils on the Doorstep and demanded that Jiang hand over the negative (which was brought to Australia for post-production). There were also reports from Asian film circles that the authorities planned to punish Jiang by forbidding him to work in China for seven years. A representative from the Chinese Film Bureau confirmed that Jiang's status was "under review" and that China suspected Jiang was awarded his prize at Cannes for "political reasons". The film was subsequently banned in China by the Chinese Film Bureau.

It was not known publicly if the seven-year ban was eventually imposed, but Jiang did not produce any directorial work between Devils on the Doorstep and the 2007 production The Sun Also Rises. However, he did act in several films, including The Missing Gun (2002), which was a huge commercial success in China. He was also nominated for Best Actor in the official Huabiao Awards in 2004 for his role in Warriors of Heaven and Earth (2003). The ban was eventually lifted and the film has been commercially available in China since.

According to director Jiang Wen, both the Japanese producers of the film and the Chinese Film Bureau expressed similar concerns: "Don't let Japanese soldiers kill people; Chinese people shouldn't be so dumb; Japanese soldiers shouldn't be kept as prisoners." A report confirmed that the authorities complained that "Chinese civilians [in the movie] don't hate the Japanese [prisoner]", but instead are "as close as brothers" with the latter. Jiang was thus accused of having belittled the Chinese whilst beautifying the Japanese.

=== Japanese release ===
Devils on the Doorstep was commercially released in Japan on 27 April 2002, further delaying a possible lift of ban on the film in China. All major newspapers in Japan gave the film mostly positive reviews. The liberal leaning Asahi Shimbun said the film "illustrates and examines the weakness of human nature". The Mainichi Shimbun called the film Jiang's "overarching question on human nature". The conservative Yomiuri Shimbun also complimented Jiang, Kagawa Teruyuki and Kenya Sawada, saying their acting was "colorful" and "believable". Inevitably, however, some reviewers voiced displeasure after viewing the film, saying that it "further estranges the Sino-Japanese friendship that was seriously damaged in the past war".

Many Japanese media reports on the film also mentioned Jiang's past visits to the controversial Yasukuni Shrine, where spirits of Japanese soldiers, including some convicted of war crimes, are housed. The news sparked a new round of debate in China, where criticism of famous actress Zhao Wei for appearing on the cover of Bazaar in a dress with a Japanese military flag design had newly subsided. Jiang responded that he visited the shrine several times to collect resources for Devils on the Doorstep.

=== Worldwide response ===
According to Box Office Mojo, Devils on the Doorstep opened in a single cinema in the United States on 18 December 2002. In its 65 days in theater, the film grossed a meager US$18,944.

Devils on the Doorstep was screened at the National Film Theatre in London, United Kingdom on 28 March and 29 March 2006. A dialogue between Jiang Wen and British director Anthony Minghella (The English Patient, The Talented Mr. Ripley) was initially arranged to take place after the screening on 28 March, but Jiang was eventually unable to be present. After watching the film, Minghella gave it positive remarks, calling it "candid, calm, yet filled with danger".

=== DVD release ===
Apart from the Chinese different versions, Fortissimo Films distributed a DVD version in Japan and 35mm copies for international releases. A DVD featuring subtitles in English and an introduction by American director Steven Soderbergh (Traffic, Ocean's Eleven) was released on 19 April 2005 in the United States by Home Vision Entertainment.

== Awards and nominations ==
List of Accolades
Award / Film Festival	Category	Recipient	Result
Cannes Film Festival (2000)	Grand Prix		Won
Cannes Film Festival (2000)	Golden Palm		Nominated
Hawaii International Film Festival (2001)	Netpac Award		Won
Kinema Junpo Awards (2003)	Best Foreign Language Director	Jiang Wen	Won
Kinema Junpo Awards (2003)	Best Supporting Actor	Kagawa Teruyuki	Won
Mainichi Film Concours (2003)	Best Foreign Language Film		Won

== See also ==
- Second Sino-Japanese War, the background of the film
- People's Republic of China-Japan relations
- Nanjing Massacre
- Surrender of Japan
