= Lu Chuan =

Chinese film director

- 陆川
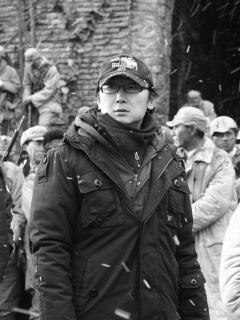
- Lu in 2009
- Born: 8 February 1971 (age 55); Kuytun, Ili Kazakh Autonomous Prefecture, Xinjiang, China
- Years active: 2000s–present
- Spouse: Hu Die (胡蝶) (m. 2015)
- Children: 2
- Awards: San Sebastian Festival – Best Picture: 2009 City of Life and Death Golden Horse Awards – Best Picture: 2004 Kekexili: Mountain Patrol Golden Rooster Awards – Best Picture: 2004 Kekexili: Mountain Patrol

Chinese name
- Traditional Chinese: 陸川
- Simplified Chinese: 陆川
Transcriptions
Standard Mandarin
- Hanyu Pinyin: Lù Chuān

Lu Chuan (born 8 February 1971) is a Chinese filmmaker. One of China's Sixth Generation directors, he is known for his films Kekexili: Mountain Patrol (2004), City of Life and Death (2009), and The Last Supper (2012).

== Early life ==
Lu was born in an army reclamation town in Xinjiang. His parents hailed from Shanghai, with ancestral roots in Nantong, Jiangsu, and had relocated to Xinjiang as part of a state initiative to support frontier development. Lu's father, Lu Tianming (陆天明), is a well-known writer. The family later moved to Beijing, where Lu grew up.

In 1988, Lu, due to his father's opposition to pursuing film studies, entered the PLA Institute of International Relations at Nanjing (now Institute of Foreign Languages in National University of Defense Technology, Nanjing) to study English. After graduation from the military institute, he was assigned to work at the Unit 749 (later known as the Bureau 749), a secret military institution involved in researching paranormal phenomena and human superpowers for weapon development, under the Commission for Science, Technology and Industry for National Defense (COSTIND).

In 1995, while working as an English translator for the COSTIND, Lu decided to pursue a master's degree in directing at the Beijing Film Academy. One of the three students who were admitted to the graduate program that year, Lu studied the works of his favorite directors including Ingmar Bergman, Jim Jarmusch, and Pier Paolo Pasolini at the academy. He graduated in 1998, with his graduate dissertation, The Author in the System, on Francis Ford Coppola.

== Career ==
Lu first gained recognition for his adapted script from Zhang Chenggong's eponymous novel for the 30-episode TV series Black Hole, directed by Guan Hu. Lu gained international acclaim as a director for his first two films: 2002's The Missing Gun and 2004's Kekexili: Mountain Patrol. Kekexili won a Golden Rooster and a Golden Horse best picture award and Special Jury Prize at the 17th Tokyo International Film Festival.

Lu spent five years on his third film, City of Life and Death, about the Nanjing Massacre during WWII. It was released in April 2009 to both critical and commercial success. However, the film's humanistic portrayal of a Japanese soldier aroused controversy in China. Lu won Achievement in Directing for the film at 3rd Asia Pacific Screen Awards and Best Director Award at 4th Asian Film Awards. The film won Best Film and Best Cinematography Awards at 57th San Sebastian Film Festival.

In 2012, Lu's historical film The Last Supper, which had its release delayed for several months due to censorship over its alleged references to modern Chinese history, received mixed reviews and performed poorly at the box office. His behavior during filming sparked controversy in the industry, including serious delays, excessive shooting, and frequent script changes, which led to the originally female lead role of Consort Yu being reduced to a character with no lines.

In 2019, his sci-fi film Bureau 749, inspired by his two-year work experience at the secret military institution Unit 749, completed shooting but faced delays due to censorship and funding issues, the latter a spillover effect from the industry-wide disruptions caused by Fan Bingbing's tax scandal. At the end of 2019, Lu enrolled in an MBA program and, starting in 2020, personally financed the film's post-production mainly by shooting advertisements. In 2023, Lu directed the opening ceremony of the Hangzhou Asian Games. In the same year, to clear the debts from Bureau 749, he joined Zhejiang TV's variety show I Am the Actor (Season 3) as a judge, wrote and directed his first TV series Fantastic Doctors (2023), based on Korean drama Good Doctor, for a partner company that had purchased the rights to the original but was unable to proceed after China's 2016 K-content ban. In 2024, after additional pickups, Bureau 749 was released to poor reviews.

== Personal life ==
Lu's first wife, surnamed Zhang, comes from a high-ranking military family. The two met and dated while serving in the military. After Lu completed filming Kekexili: Mountain Patrol, they divorced.

From around 2006 to 2008, Lu dated singer Tang Can.

In 2008, while filming his film City of Life and Death, Lu began dating actress Qin Lan. Their relationship was confirmed in September 2009 after being spotted together. They split in 2013.

In 2015, Lu married CCTV anchor Hu Die. The same year, their son was born. In 2020, their daughter was born.

== Filmography ==
Year	English Title	Chinese Title	Awards
2002	The Missing Gun	寻枪	Annual Best Script, Taipei Golden Horse Film Festival, 2001; Best Maiden Work Award, 9th College Student Film Festival of China; Official selection for “Upstream” section of Venice International Film Festival
2004	Kekexili: Mountain Patrol	可可西里	Golden Horse for Best Film, Special Jury Prize at the 17th Tokyo International Film Festival, Best Feature Film Golden Rooster Awards, Best Asian Film at the 25th Hong Kong Film Awards, Rajatha Chakoram for Best Director, Audience Prize, FIPRESCI Critics Prize, International Film Festival of Kerala, 2005, Best Feature Film at Banff Mountain Film Festival, 2005, Don Quixote Award-Special Mention at Berlin International Film Festival, 2005, Outstanding Director and Outstanding Film at Huabiao Film Awards, 2005, Best Director at Shanghai Film Critics Awards, 2005
2009	City of Life and Death	南京！南京！	Best film, San Sebastian Festival, 2009, Achievement in Directing, 3rd Asia Pacific Screen Awards, Best Director Award, 4th Asian Film Awards, Best Foreign Film at Los Angeles Film Critics Association Awards, 2011, Best Feature at Oslo Films from the South Festival, 2009
2012	The Last Supper	王的盛宴	
2015	Chronicles of the Ghostly Tribe	九层妖塔	
2016	Born in China	生在中国	
2024	The 749 Bureau	749局	
TBA	River Town: Two Years on the Yangtze		
