= Let the Bullets Fly =

2010 Chinese-Hong Kong film by Jiang Wen

- Theatrical release poster
- Traditional Chinese: 讓子彈飛
- Simplified Chinese: 让子弹飞
- Hanyu Pinyin: Ràng zǐ dàn fēi
- Directed by: Jiang Wen
- Screenplay by: Jiang Wen
- Story by: Ma Shitu
- Produced by: Albert Yeung; Ping Dong; Yin Homber
- Starring: Jiang Wen; Chow Yun-fat; Ge You
- Cinematography: Zhao Fei
- Music by: Joe Hisaishi; Shu Nan
- Production company: China Film Group
- Distributed by: Emperor Motion Pictures
- Release date: December 16, 2010 (China)
- Running time: 132 minutes
- Countries: China; Hong Kong
- Languages: Mandarin; Sichuanese
- Box office: US$117.5 million (China); US$140 million (worldwide)

Let the Bullets Fly is a 2010 action comedy film written and directed by Jiang Wen, based on a story by Ma Shitu. The film is a Chinese-Hong Kong co-production, set in Sichuan during the 1920s when the bandit Zhang (Jiang Wen) descends upon a town posing as its new governor. The film also stars Chow Yun-fat, Ge You, Carina Lau, and Chen Kun.

The film's script went through over thirty drafts before Jiang Wen was happy with it. Let the Bullets Fly was originally to be released in September 2010 but was pushed back to December. Made in Mandarin and Sichuanese, the film broke several box office records in China, and has received critical acclaim, when it was released. Let the Bullets Fly grossed 674 million yuan (US$110 million) in Chinese box office (becoming the highest grossing domestic film in China until it was beaten by Painted Skin: The Resurrection in 2012) and $140 million worldwide.

This film would become the first part of Jiang Wen's gangster Beiyang trilogy with Gone with the Bullets and Hidden Man.

== Background ==
Following the commercial disappointment of The Sun Also Rises (2007), Jiang Wen reassessed his filmmaking strategy and sought to balance artistic expression with broader audience appeal. Let the Bullets Fly marked a turning point in his career, combining his distinctive personal style with commercial success. The film is often regarded as an important stage in Jiang Wen's creative development and commercialization strategy.

== Plot ==
Set in southern China during the Beiyang Period, bandit leader “Poxy” Zhang (Jiang Wen) ambushes a train carrying Ma Bangde (Ge You), who is traveling to Goose Town to assume the position of county governor. After the train derails, Ma protects himself by lying about his identity, he claims to be a counsellor and convinces Zhang to impersonate the governor to steal the town’s finances. In Goose Town, Zhang’s appointment threatens Master Huang (Chow Yun-fat), a powerful local mobster who lives in a fortified citadel and routinely splits levied taxes with previous governors.

What follows is an escalating battle of wits and deception between Zhang and Huang, with Ma caught in the middle. After a series of assassination attempts, kidnappings, and the deaths of both Zhang’s godson and Ma himself, Zhang vows revenge. He motivates the townsfolk and incites them to storm the citadel by staging a public execution of Huang’s look-alike, breaking Huang’s psychological hold over the citizens. After the defeat, Huang commits suicide with a landmine, and Zhang’s surviving gang members leave for Shanghai.

== Production ==
Director Jiang Wen went over 30 drafts of the film's script. Jiang Wen and his writing team aimed to adapt the political satire of Ma Shitu’s (马识途) original short story, Ten Extraordinary Chinese Stories (夜谭十记), into an action-oriented narrative. The casting of Jiang Wen, Chow Yun-fat (周润发), and Ge You (葛优) served as the film's core promotional and structural foundation, intended to bridge the gap between niche auteur cinema and mass-market appeal.

Filming took place primarily in Guangdong province, utilizing the Kaiping Diaolou (开平碉楼) in Zili Village (自力村) and Magang (马冈). These UNESCO World Heritage sites, characterized by fortified towers that blend Western and Chinese architectural elements, provided the setting for the fictional Goose Town (鹅城). The use of these historical structures grounded the production in an authentic setting, avoiding reliance on studio-built sets.

=== Music ===
Joe Hisaishi composed the film's score. Jiang Wen requested the repurposing of orchestral themes from their previous collaboration, The Sun Also Rises (2007), to maintain thematic consistency across his "Beiyang Trilogy." The soundtrack employs brass-heavy arrangements to reinforce the film's masculine aesthetic and historical scale.

=== Visual presentation ===
The film used the dark tones and the arrangement of yellow lighting to make the entire film more nostalgic and have a stronger sense of The Times. Its visual presentation also relies on rapid editing, frequent close-ups, compressed background space, and controlled camera movement to create a strong visual rhythm and heighten narrative tension.

=== Aesthetics presentation ===
The film's violent aesthetic is in line with the war background of the film in the 1920s, enhancing the film's entertainment value. Its stylized violence also reflects the film's use of western and spaghetti western genre conventions, including firearms, bandit figures, lawless local settings, and graphic violence.

=== Characterization ===
The film's characterization relies on archetypal figures that mirror the rigid hierarchy of the Beiyang era. Flora (花姐; Huajie) functions as a central female presence, acting as a bridge between the bandits' revolutionary ideals and the civilian population. Her role is defined by strategic ambiguity, as she navigates between the bandits and Master Huang's power structure. In contrast, characters like Six (老六; Lao-liu) serve as tragic moral anchors, whose deaths act as primary narrative devices that force the protagonist to transition from a profit-driven bandit to a symbolic anti-hero.

The character in the film applied dialects, the Sichuan-Chongqing dialects and northern dialects to showcase the strong original local characteristics. The mixture of multiple dialects adds to the promotion of local culture to the film.

=== Critical reflection ===
The presentation of violent forms in the film has a strong impact on the audience. Although it weakens the moral concepts of the film, the deaths of the characters in the film have a significant reflective effect on the audience. The film also employs dark humor and allegorical characters to reflect on issues of social hierarchy, extending its significance beyond conventional action and comedy.

== Marketing ==
The marketing budget for Let the Bullets Fly was approximately 50 million Yuan (US$6 million). The promotional strategy included deploying posters in major public areas across China and leveraging the high profile of the film’s three lead actors to generate media coverage. The campaign utilized a multi-platform approach, including television, print media, and press conferences. A significant component of the strategy relied on internet marketing to foster online word-of-mouth. The core marketing concept was described as “affinity marketing,” which prioritized engaging the audience as peers rather than traditional consumers, this involved direct online interaction between the cast, directors, and the public.

== Release ==
Let the Bullets Fly was originally scheduled for a release in September 2010. The release date was postponed as a spokesperson for Emperor Motion Pictures stated that "There is a lot of post-production to be done and it has to be done properly." The film premiered in Beijing on December 6, 2010, with wide release in Mainland China on December 16. Let the Bullets Fly was released in Hong Kong on January 13, 2011. The film has become the highest grossing Chinese film, beating the record set by Aftershock. Following Avatar, this film is now the second highest-grossing film ever released in China.

Let the Bullets Fly had its American premiere at the Tribeca Film Festival in 2011. The festival's co-founder, Martin Scorsese, had a private screening of the film in August 2010 during post-production when he was visiting Beijing with his family.

=== Box office ===
The film's opening day gross was $4.5 million (RMB30m), which did not break the opening day record set by Feng Xiaogang's Aftershock. By the weekend, the film's accumulated grossed reached $19.52 million (RMB130.18m) and it became the local film fastest to break the RMB100m mark. Let the Bullets Fly earned a total of 400 million yuan (60 million US dollars) in its first 11 days of release. It was scored 7.3 points on IMDb.

=== Critical reception ===
In China, Let the Bullets Fly garnered acclaim for its sharp dialogue and complex narrative, while drawing some criticism for its overt violence. Entertainment trade publications praised the film’s commercial appeal, Variety described it as “an entertaining hot pot of wry political commentary and general mischief,” noting the contrast between its computerized mayhem and subtle visual composition.The Hollywood Reporter echoed this, classifying the film as an “unabashedly entertaining” and “rollicking Chinese western”.

In academic circles, the film has been widely analyzed for its allegorical commentary on Chinese history and contemporary politics. Sebastian Veg argues that the film functions as a political pastiche, deliberately subverting the conventions of state-sponsored propaganda films. Veg notes that Jiang Wen’s protagonist appropriates Maoist rhetoric, such as the mobilization of the masses, to deliver a post-socialist critique of modern elite corruption and social inequality. Similarly, Xiaoming Luo interprets the film as a reflection on the cyclical nature of revolution. Luo suggests that the film’s title metaphor, “let the bullets fly for a while,” represents the delayed impact of revolutionary action, which ultimately concludes with the heroes merely replacing the former elite, signifying historical hopelessness.

Furthermore, the film’s approach to the Western genre functions as a continuation of the cultural critique and national allegory seen in 1980s Chinese cinema, operating through a postmodern lens. By adopting the iconography and plots of American and Spaghetti Western films, Jiang presents a deep personal vision of Chinese history and the role of revolution, although this genre adoption may limit the film’s political scope. Additionally, the film utilizes the style of absurd comedy to satirize and criticize social problems, blending absurdity with reality to expose the darker aspects of society. Through its unique comedic aesthetics, the narrative acts as a legendary reflection of social changes and the struggle of human nature, guiding the audience to explore themes of justice and fairness while highlighting the strength of the human spirit.

== Awards and nominations ==
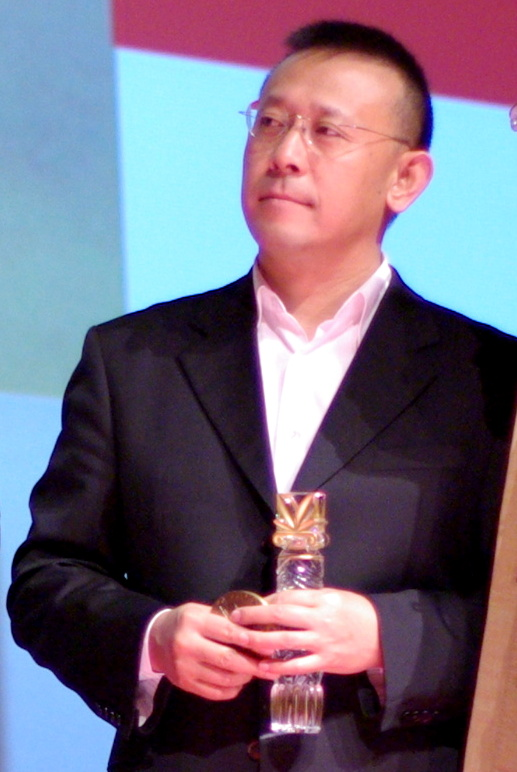
Jiang Wen (pictured) won the award for Best Director at the 18th Hong Kong Film Critics Society Awards

Let the Bullets Fly's awards and nominations included Best Film and Directing nominations from the Asian Film Awards and the Asia Pacific Screen Awards. Jiang also received the Best Director award from the Hong Kong Film Critics Society.

Awards
Ceremony	Category	Name	Outcome
5th Asian Film Awards
5th Asian Film Awards	Best Film		Nominated
5th Asian Film Awards	Best Director	Jiang Wen	Nominated
5th Asian Film Awards	Best Actor	Chow Yun-fat	Nominated
5th Asian Film Awards	Best Supporting Actress	Carina Lau Kar-ling	Nominated
5th Asian Film Awards	Best Screenplay	Jiang Wen	Nominated
5th Asian Film Awards	Best Costume Design	William Chang Suk-pin	Won
5th Asia Pacific Screen Awards
5th Asia Pacific Screen Awards	Best Feature Film		Nominated
5th Asia Pacific Screen Awards	Achievement in Directing	Jiang Wen	Nominated
2011 Golden Horse Film Festival and Awards
2011 Golden Horse Film Festival and Awards	Best Film		Nominated
2011 Golden Horse Film Festival and Awards	Best Director	Jiang Wen	Nominated
2011 Golden Horse Film Festival and Awards	Best Leading Actor	Ge You	Nominated
2011 Golden Horse Film Festival and Awards	Best Supporting Actress	Carina Lau	Nominated
2011 Golden Horse Film Festival and Awards	Best Adapted Screenplay	Wei Xiao, Li Bukong, Zhu Sujin, Shu Ping, Jiang Wen, Guo Junli	Won
2011 Golden Horse Film Festival and Awards	Best Cinematography	Zhao Fei	Won
2011 Golden Horse Film Festival and Awards	Best Visual Effects	Eman Tse, Victor Wong	Nominated
2011 Golden Horse Film Festival and Awards	Best Makeup & Costume Design	William Chang	Nominated
2011 Golden Horse Film Festival and Awards	Best Sound Effects	Wen Bo, Wang Gang	Nominated
31st Hong Kong Film Awards
31st Hong Kong Film Awards	Best Film	Ma Ke, Albert Lee, Yin Homber, Barbie Tung, Zhao Haicheng	Nominated
31st Hong Kong Film Awards	Best Director	Jiang Wen	Nominated
31st Hong Kong Film Awards	Best Screenplay	Zhu Sujin, Shu Ping, Jiang Wen, Guo Junli, Wei Xiao, Li Bukong	Nominated
31st Hong Kong Film Awards	Best Actor	Jiang Wen	Nominated
31st Hong Kong Film Awards	Best Actor	Ge You	Nominated
31st Hong Kong Film Awards	Best Supporting Actress	Carina Lau	Nominated
31st Hong Kong Film Awards	Best Cinematography	Zhao Fei	Nominated
31st Hong Kong Film Awards	Best Film Editing	Jiang Wen, Cao Wei Jie	Nominated
31st Hong Kong Film Awards	Best Art Direction	Eddy Wong, Yu Qing Hua & Gao Yi Guang	Nominated
31st Hong Kong Film Awards	Best Costume & Make Up Design	William Chang Suk Ping	Won
31st Hong Kong Film Awards	Best Action Choreography	Sit Chun Wai, Lee Chung Chi	Nominated
31st Hong Kong Film Awards	Best Sound Design	Wen Bo, Wang Gang	Nominated
31st Hong Kong Film Awards	Best Visual Effects	Victor Wong, Xie Yi Wen	Nominated
18th Hong Kong Film Critics Society Award
18th Hong Kong Film Critics Society Award	Best Director	Jiang Wen	Won
2012th China Film Director's Guild Awards	Best Director	Jiang Wen	Won
2012th China Film Director's Guild Awards	Best Actor	Ge You, Yun-Fat Chow	Won
2012th China Film Director's Guild Awards	Best Screenplay	Zhu Sujin	Nominated
