= Jiang Wen =

Chinese actor, screenwriter, and director

- 姜文
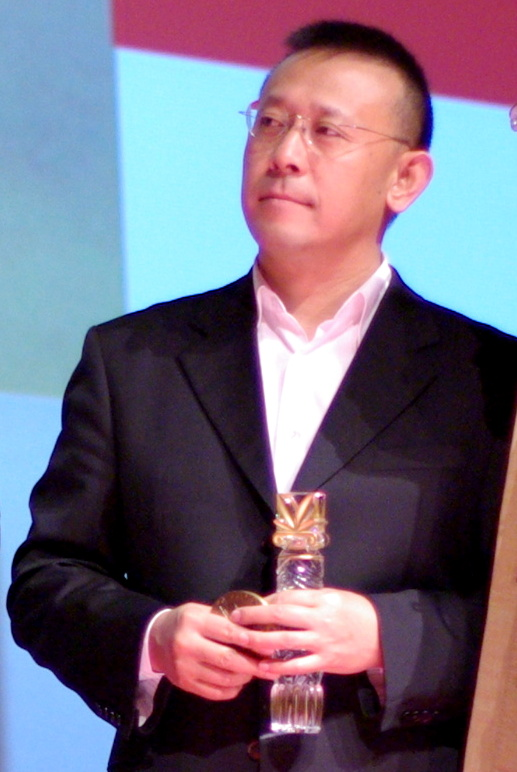
- Jiang in 2008
- Born: Jiang Xiaojun; 5 January 1963 (age 63); Tangshan, Hebei, China
- Education: Central Academy of Drama
- Occupations: Actor, screenwriter, film director
- Years active: 1986–present
- Spouses: Sandrine Chenivesse (m. 1997–2005) Zhou Yun (m. 2005)
- Children: 3
- Parent(s): Jiang Hongqi (father); Gao Yang (mother)
- Relatives: Jiang Wu (brother)
- Awards: Hong Kong Film Awards – Best Supporting Actor; 1997 The Soong Sisters Hong Kong Film Critics Society Awards – Best Director; 2011 Let the Bullets Fly; Best Screenplay; 2011 Let the Bullets Fly Golden Horse Awards – Best Director; 1996 In the Heat of the Sun; Best Adapted Screenplay; 1996 In the Heat of the Sun; 2011 Let the Bullets Fly; Best Film Editing; 2007 The Sun Also Rises Hundred Flowers Awards – Best Actor; 1986 Hibiscus Town; 1989 A Woman for two

Chinese name
- Chinese: 姜文
Transcriptions
Standard Mandarin
- Hanyu Pinyin: Jiāng Wén

Chinese name
- Traditional Chinese: 姜小軍
- Simplified Chinese: 姜小军
Transcriptions
Standard Mandarin
- Hanyu Pinyin: Jiāng Xiǎojūn
Yue: Cantonese
- Jyutping: geung1 man4

Jiang Wen (born 5 January 1963) is a Chinese actor and filmmaker. He directed and starred in films such as In the Heat of the Sun (1994), Devils on the Doorstep (2000), The Sun Also Rises (2007), and Let the Bullets Fly (2010). He is also known for his roles in television series A Native of Beijing in New York (1992) and in films Hibiscus Town (1986), Red Sorghum (1988), and Rogue One (2016). He is brother of actor Jiang Wu.

== Early life, family and education ==
Jiang was born in Tangshan to a family of military personnel. He relocated to Beijing at the age of ten. In 1973, he attended Beijing No. 72 Middle School, where he studied alongside Ying Da. In 1980, he entered the Central Academy of Drama and graduated in 1984.

== Career ==
=== Acting ===
After graduation, Jiang was assigned to China Youth Art Institute as an actor. That same year, he started acting both on the stage at the China Youth Theater and in films.

Jiang's debut role was in the film The Last Empress, portraying Puyi. He rose to prominence for his role in Hibiscus Town, directed by Xie Jin, which earned Jiang the Best Actor at the Hundred Flowers Awards. Jiang reunited with his Hibiscus Town co-star Liu Xiaoqing in the film Chun Tao, directed by Ling Zifeng. In 1988, Jiang starred along side Gong Li in Zhang Yimou's directorial debut Red Sorghum.

In the 1990s, Jiang starred in films such as Black Snow (1990), Li Lianying: The Imperial Eunuch (1991), The Emperor's Shadow (1996), and The Soong Sisters (1997). He reunited with Zhang Yimou in the film Keep Cool (1997). Jiang also acted in television, most notably in the television series A Native of Beijing in New York (1992), based on the novel Beijinger in New York.

In the 2000s, Jiang's notable credits include The Missing Gun, Green Tea, My Father and I, Warriors of Heaven and Earth, Jasmine Women and Letter from an Unknown Woman. He also played notable historical figures, Mao Renfeng in the propaganda film The Founding of a Republic; and Cao Cao in the historical war film The Lost Bladesman.

Jiang co-starred in the Star Wars anthology film Rogue One, released in December 2016. In the film, he portrays Baze Malbus, a native of the moon of Jedha who is drawn into the war against the Galactic Empire.

=== Writing and directing ===
Jiang wrote and directed his first film in 1994, In the Heat of the Sun, adapted from a novel by Wang Shuo. A tale set in the Cultural Revolution, it won for its young lead actor Xia Yu the Best Actor prize at the Venice Film Festival and garnered six Golden Horse Awards in Taiwan.

In 2000, Jiang co-wrote and directed the black comedy film Devils on the Doorstep. The film premiered at the 2000 Cannes Film Festival and clinched the Grand Prix but was subsequently banned in its home country; said to undermine the country because it "seriously distorts Chinese history". Jiang himself was banned from making films for seven years. In 2001 he was a member of the jury at the 23rd Moscow International Film Festival.

Jiang returned with his fourth feature The Sun Also Rises in 2007; a fantasy realism film which contains a polyptych of interconnected stories in different time-zones; the film received positive reviews from critics but bombed at the box office. He then collaborated with 10 other directors on the romance anthology film New York, I Love You.

Jiang's fifth feature, a Western-styled action comedy Let the Bullets Fly set a box office record by becoming the fastest Chinese-language film to break RMB100m mark ($15.15m) in Chinese cinemas; and received critical acclaim.

In 2013 he was named as a member of the jury at the 70th Venice International Film Festival. In 2014, Jiang directed the action comedy film Gone with the Bullets, which screened at the 65th Berlin International Film Festival. In 2018, Jiang directed the Republican-era spy comedy Hidden Man. The film was China's submission to the 91st Academy Awards. These two films together with Let the Bullets Fly form his gangster Beiyang trilogy.

== Personal life ==
=== Family ===
Jiang Wen's father is Jiang Hongqi, a veteran of the Korean War. Described as taciturn and bookish, he played a minor role in his son's 2011 film, Let the Bullets Fly. Jiang's mother Gao Yang — "a cheerful, extroverted woman" — worked as a piano teacher. Jiang Wen is the eldest son in the family; in addition to his younger brother, Jiang Wu, he has a younger sister, Jiang Huan.

Close to his family, Jiang has a deep bond with his parents: whenever he is on site for shooting or acting, he arranges for them to come to his workplace so that he can spend time with them. Each movie he makes, he saves the best seats for them and asks for their opinions. Even on artistic composition, he sometimes resorts to them for advice. It was his parents' endorsement on the original novel of A Native of Beijing in New York that propelled Jiang into his performance. Later, during the filming of his first feature film, In the Heat of the Sun, Jiang again considered their evaluation of Xia Yu, before settling on him as the leading actor.

=== Relationships ===
In 1987, Jiang began a relationship with Liu Xiaoqing, when he was 24 and she was 37. Liu, who was then married to Chen Guojun, divorced in 1989 after Chen discovered the affair. After an eight-year relationship, during which they lived together for three years, Liu and Jiang separated amicably in 1994.

In 1995, Jiang began a relationship with Sandrine Chenivesse, a Doctor of Anthropology at the University of Paris, researching philosophy and Taoism in China, at an artistic event. They married in Paris in 1997 and had a daughter together, but the marriage remained discreet until their appearance on the red carpet of the 2000 Cannes Film Festival. In 2005, Chenivesse announced their divorce, citing long-distance separation as the cause.

In 2001, during the filming of Warriors of Heaven and Earth, Jiang was introduced to cast member Zhou Yun, by fellow actress Zhao Wei. Later, Jiang recommended Zhou to the cast of The Music Box, but each left the crew after a creative difference between Jiang and the director Chen Yifei. Jiang and Zhou married in 2005 and have two sons together.

== Filmography ==
=== Film ===
Acting roles

Year	Title	Role	Notes
1986	The Last Empress	Puyi	
1986	Hibiscus Town	Qiu Shutian	
1986	Tears of the Bridal Sedan		
1987	Red Sorghum	My grandpapa	
1989	Chun Tao	Wen Chiang	
1990	Black Snow	Li Huiquan	
1991	Li Lianying: The Imperial Eunuch	Li Lianying	
1993	The Trail	Chinese policeman	
1994	In the Heat of the Sun	Ma Xiaojun (adult)	
1996	The Emperor's Shadow	Ying Zheng	
1997	Keep Cool	Bookseller	
1997	The Soong Sisters	Charlie Soong	
2000	Devils on the Doorstep	Ma Dasan	
2002	The Missing Gun	Ma Shan	
2003	Green Tea	Chen Mingliang	
2003	My Father and I	Policeman	
2003	Warriors of Heaven and Earth	Lieutenant Li	
2004	Jasmine Women	Mr. Meng	
2004	Letter from an Unknown Woman	Writer / Mr. Xu	
2007	The Sun Also Rises	Tang Yunlin	
2009	The Founding of a Republic	Mao Renfeng	
2010	Let the Bullets Fly	Zhang Mazi	
2011	The Lost Bladesman	Cao Cao	
2014	Gone with the Bullets	Ma Zouri	
2016	Rogue One: A Star Wars Story	Baze Malbus	
2018	Hidden Man	Lan Qingfeng	
2021	The Curse of Turandot	Khan	Cameo appearance
2025	You are the Best	Lang Guoren	

=== Filmmaking credits ===
Feature film

Year	Title	Director	Writer	Producer
1994	In the Heat of the Sun	Yes	Yes	No
2000	Devils on the Doorstep	Yes	Yes	Yes
2007	The Sun Also Rises	Yes	Yes	Yes
2010	Let the Bullets Fly	Yes	Yes	No
2014	Gone with the Bullets	Yes	Yes	Executive
2018	Hidden Man	Yes	Yes	Executive
2025	You are the Best	Yes	Yes	No

Short film

Year	Title	Director	Writer	Producer
2008	New York, I Love You	Yes	No	No

=== Television series ===
Year	Title	Role	Notes
1993	Beijinger in New York	Wang Qiming	
1997	A Sentimental Story		Producer
2005	Lotus Lantern	Chenxiang	
2006	Da Qing Fengyun	Hong Taiji	

== Accolades ==
Year	Award	Category	Nominated work	Notes
1987	10th Hundred Flowers Awards	Best Actor	Hibiscus Town	
1989	12th Hundred Flowers Awards	Best Actor	Chun Tao	
1989	2nd Golden Phoenix Awards	Society Award	Red Sorghum	
1994	12th China TV Golden Eagle Award	Best Actor	A Native of Beijing in New York	
1996	33rd Golden Horse Film Festival and Awards	Best Director	In the Heat of the Sun	
1996	33rd Golden Horse Film Festival and Awards	Best Original Screenplay	In the Heat of the Sun	
1998	17th Hong Kong Film Awards	Best Supporting Actor	The Soong Sisters	
2000	53rd Cannes Film Festival	Grand Prix	Devils on the Doorstep	
2001	54th Cannes Film Festival	France Culture Award - Foreign Cineaste of the Year	Devils on the Doorstep	
2003	3rd Chinese Film Media Awards	Best Actor	The Missing Gun	
2003	3rd Chinese Film Media Awards	Most Popular Actor	The Missing Gun	
2003	12th Shanghai Film Critics Awards	Best Actor	The Missing Gun	
2004	4th Chinese Film Media Awards	Most Popular Actor	Warriors of Heaven and Earth	
2004	11th Beijing College Student Film Festival	Most Popular Actor	Warriors of Heaven and Earth	
2005	10th Golden Phoenix Awards	Society Award	Warriors of Heaven and Earth	
2007	44th Golden Horse Film Festival and Awards	Best Film Editing	The Sun Also Rises	
2008	21st Tokyo International Film Festival	Asian Film Award - Special Mention	The Sun Also Rises	
2011	20th Shanghai Film Critics Awards	Best Actor	The Lost Bladesman	
2011	48th Golden Horse Film Festival and Awards	Best Original Screenplay	Let the Bullets Fly	
2011	11th Chinese Film Media Awards	Best Director	Let the Bullets Fly	
2012	3rd China Film Director's Guild Awards	Best Director	Let the Bullets Fly	
2014	17th Shanghai International Film Festival	Outstanding Contribution Award	—N/a	

== Works cited ==
- Silbergeld, Jerome (2008), Body in Question: Image and Illusion in Two Chinese Films by Director Jiang Wen (Princeton: Princeton University Press)
