= List of Chinese films of 1999 =

A list of mainland Chinese films released in 1999:

| Title | Director | Cast | Genre | Notes |
|---|---|---|---|---|
| A Beautiful New World | Shi Runjiu | Jiang Wu | Comedy | |
| Agreed Not to Separate | Fu Jingsheng; Fei Ming | Pu Cunxin; Xu Qing | Drama | |
| Crash Landing | Zhang Jianya | You Yong, Xu Fan, Shao Bing | Action/Thriller | |
| Crazy English | Zhang Yuan | Li Yang | Documentary | Film about Li Yang, the founder of Crazy English |
| Crystal Sky of Yesterday | | | Animation | |
| Deja Vu | Cho Kin-nam | Nicky Wu; Zhao Wei | Romance | |
| The Emperor and the Assassin | Chen Kaige | Gong Li | Historical | Entered into the 1999 Cannes Film Festival |
| Flag of the Republic | Lei Xianhe; Wang Jixing | Wang Xueqi; Xie Gang; Zhu Lin | Drama | |
| The House | Wang Xiaoshuai | You Yong | Comedy | |
| Lotus Lantern | Guang Xi Chang | Jiang Wen, Ning Jing | Family/Animation | |
| Lover's Grief over the Yellow River | Feng Xiaoning | Ning Jing | War/Romance | Also known as The Legend of the Yellow River or Grief Over the Yellow River |
| Lunar Eclipse | Wang Quan'an | Yu Nan | Romantic drama | Wang Quan'an's directorial debut, entered into the 22nd Moscow International Film Festival |
| Men and Women | Liu Bingjian | Yu Bo, Yang Qing | Comedy | |
| My 1919 | Huang Jianzhong | Chen Daoming | Historical | |
| The National Anthem | Wu Ziniu | Chen Kun | Historical | |
| Not One Less | Zhang Yimou | Wei Minzhi | Drama | Golden Lion winner of 1999 |
| Ordinary Heroes | Ann Hui | Lee Kang-sheng; Anthony Wong; Rachel Lee | Drama | |
| Postmen in the Mountains | Huo Jianqi | Liu Ye; Teng Rujun | Drama | 1999 Golden Rooster for Best Picture |
| The Road Home | Zhang Yimou | Zhang Ziyi | Romance | Co-winner of the 2000 Golden Rooster for Best Picture |
| Roaring Across the Horizon | Chen Guoxing | | Drama | Co-winner of the 2000 Golden Rooster for Best Picture |
| Scenery | He Jianjun | | Drama | |
| Seventeen Years | Zhang Yuan | Li Bingbing | Drama | |
| Shower | Zhang Yang | Zhu Xu, Pu Cunxin, Jiang Wu | Comedy | Fipresci Prize winner at the 2000 Toronto International Film Festival |
| Something About Secret | Huang Jianxin | Wang Zhiwen, Jiang Shan | Drama | |
| Sorry Baby | Feng Xiaogang | Fu Biao, Ge You | Comedy | |

== See also ==
- 1999 in China
