= List of Chinese films =

This is an index for the list of films produced in mainland China ordered by decade on separate pages. For an alphabetical listing of Chinese films see Category:Chinese films

== 20th century ==
- List of Chinese films before 1930
- List of Chinese films of the 1930s
- List of Chinese films of the 1940s
- List of Chinese films of the 1950s
- List of Chinese films of the 1960s
- List of Chinese films of the 1970s
- List of Chinese films of the 1980s
- List of Chinese films of the 1990s

== 2000s ==
- List of Chinese films of 2000
- List of Chinese films of 2001
- List of Chinese films of 2002
- List of Chinese films of 2003
- List of Chinese films of 2004
- List of Chinese films of 2005
- List of Chinese films of 2006
- List of Chinese films of 2007
- List of Chinese films of 2008
- List of Chinese films of 2009

== 2010s ==
- List of Chinese films of 2010
- List of Chinese films of 2011
- List of Chinese films of 2012
- List of Chinese films of 2013
- List of Chinese films of 2014
- List of Chinese films of 2015
- List of Chinese films of 2016
- List of Chinese films of 2017
- List of Chinese films of 2018
- List of Chinese films of 2019

== 2020s ==
- List of Chinese films of 2020
- List of Chinese films of 2021
- List of Chinese films of 2022
- List of Chinese films of 2023
- List of Chinese films of 2024
- List of Chinese films of 2025
- List of Chinese films of 2026
- List of Chinese films of 2027

== See also ==
- Cinema of China
- Best 100 Chinese Motion Pictures as chosen by the 24th Hong Kong Film Awards
- List of Chinese films of the 2020s
