= List of Chinese films of the 2000s =

This is a list of films produced in China ordered by year of release in the 2000s. For an alphabetical listing of Chinese films see Category:Chinese films

== 2000 ==
- List of Chinese films of 2000

== 2001 ==
- List of Chinese films of 2001

== 2002 ==
- List of Chinese films of 2002

== 2003 ==
- List of Chinese films of 2003

== 2004 ==
- List of Chinese films of 2004

== 2005 ==
- List of Chinese films of 2005

== 2006 ==
- List of Chinese films of 2006

== 2007 ==
- List of Chinese films of 2007

== 2008 ==
- List of Chinese films of 2008

== 2009 ==
- List of Chinese films of 2009

== See also ==
- Cinema of China
- Best 100 Chinese Motion Pictures as chosen by the 24th Hong Kong Film Awards
