= List of Chinese films of 2002 =

The following is a list of mainland Chinese films first released in year 2002.

== Films released ==
| Title | Director | Cast | Genre | Notes |
|---|---|---|---|---|
| Balzac and the Little Chinese Seamstress | Dai Sijie | Zhou Xun, Liu Ye, Chen Kun | Romantic drama | Chinese-French co-production, screened at the 2002 Cannes Film Festival |
| C.E.O. | Wu Tianming | Liang Shi | | |
| Charging Out Amazon | Song Yaming | Hou Yong, Mu Lixin | Action | Co-winner of the 2002 Golden Rooster Award for Best Picture |
| Chen Mo and Meiting | Liu Hao | Du Huanan, Wang Lingbo | Romantic drama | |
| Chicken Poets | Meng Jinghui | Chen Jianbin | Drama | |
| Cry Woman | Liu Bingjian | Liao Qin | Comedy-Drama | Screened at the 2002 Cannes Film Festival |
| Eyes of a Beauty | Guan Hu | Huang Yiqun | Drama | |
| For the Children | Yang Yazhou | Ni Peng, Yuan Quan | Drama | Co-winner of the 2002 Golden Rooster Award for Best Feature Film, Best Director, Best Actress, Best Supporting Actress |
| Gada Meilin | Feng Xiaoning | | Historical | |
| Hero | Zhang Yimou | Jet Li, Tony Leung, Maggie Cheung | Wuxia | |
| A High Sky Summer | Li Jixian | | Drama/Children | |
| I Love You | Zhang Yuan | Xu Jinglei, Tong Dawei | Drama | |
| Incense | Ning Hao | | | |
| Life Show | Huo Jianqi | Tao Hong, Tao Zeru | Drama | Golden Goblet at the 2002 Shanghai International Film Festival |
| The Missing Gun | Lu Chuan | Ning Jing, Jiang Wen | Black comedy | First use of digital film for a Chinese production |
| On the Other Side of the Bridge | Hu Mei | Wang Zhiwen, Nina Proll | Romantic drama | Chinese-Austrian co-production |
| Railroad of Hope | Ning Ying | | Documentary | |
| Shanghai Women | Peng Xiaolian | Lü Liping, Zheng Zhenyao | | |
| Sky Lovers | Jiang Qinmin | Liu Ye | Romance | |
| Spring Subway | Zhang Yibai | Xu Jinglei, Geng Le, Zhang Yang | Romantic drama | Zhang Yibai's directorial debut |
| Springtime in a Small Town | Tian Zhuangzhuang | Hu Jingfan, Wu Jun, Xin Baiqing | Romantic drama | Remake of Spring in a Small Town |
| This Winter | Zhong Hua | | Documentary | |
| Together | Chen Kaige | Tang Yun, Liu Peiqi, Wang Zhiwen, Chen Kaige | Drama | |
| Under the Skyscraper | Du Haibin | | Documentary | |
| Unknown Pleasures | Jia Zhangke | Zhao Weiwei, Wu Qiong, Zhao Tao | Drama | Entered into the 2002 Cannes Film Festival |
| Where Have All the Flowers Gone | Gao Xiaosong | Zhou Xun, Xia Yu | Romance | |
| Zhou Yu's Train | Sun Zhou | Gong Li | Romance | |

== See also ==
- List of Chinese films of 2001
- List of Chinese films of 2003
