= List of Chinese films of 2003 =

The following is a list of mainland Chinese films first released in year 2003.

== Films released ==
Title	Director	Cast	Genre	Notes
All Tomorrow's Parties	Yu Lik-wai	Diao Yinan		Screened at the 2003 Cannes Film Festival
Blind Shaft	Li Yang	Li Yixiang, Wang Shuangbao, Wang Baoqiang	Drama/Thriller	Silver Bear winner at the Berlin International Film Festival
Cala, My Dog!	Lu Xuechang	Ge You, Li Bin	Drama-Comedy	
Cell Phone	Feng Xiaogang	Ge You, Fan Bingbing, Zhang Guoli, Xu Fan	Comedy	
Drifters	Wang Xiaoshuai	Duan Long	Drama	Screened at the 2003 Cannes Film Festival
The Foliage	Lü Yue	Liu Ye, Shu Qi	Drama	
Green Tea	Zhang Yuan	Zhao Wei	Romantic drama	
Jade Goddess of Mercy	Ann Hui	Nicholas Tse, Zhao Wei	Drama	Entered into the 26th Moscow International Film Festival
My Father and I	Xu Jinglei	Xu Jinglei, Ye Daying	Drama	Actress Xu Jinglei's directorial debut.
Nuan	Huo Jianqi	Guo Xiaodong, Li Jia	Romantic drama	2003 Golden Rooster winner for best film
The Only Sons	Gan Xiao'er	Gan Xiao'er, Hu Shuli	Drama	
Purple Butterfly	Lou Ye	Zhang Ziyi	Drama	Entered into the 2003 Cannes Film Festival
Red Snow	Zhang Jianya	Karen Mok	Action/Thriller	
San Yuan Li	Ou Ning. Cao Fei		Experimental Documentary	
Tang Poetry	Zhang Lu		Drama	
Tie Xi Qu: West of the Tracks	Wang Bing		Documentary	Award winning 9-hour documentary in three 3-hour segments
Uniform	Diao Yi'nan	Liang Hongli, Zeng Shuoqiong	Drama	
Warm Spring	Wulan Tana	Tian Chengren, Qi Ruyi; Zhang Yan, Hao Yang; Yu Weijie	Drama	Wulan Tana won the Golden Rooster Awards for Best Directorial Debut in 2003
Warriors of Heaven and Earth	He Ping	Jiang Wen, Kiichi Nakai, Zhao Wei	Historical/Action	
Zhou Yu's Train	Sun Zhou	Gong Li, Tony Leung Ka-Fai	Drama	

== See also ==
- List of Chinese films of 2002
- List of Chinese films of 2004
