= List of Chinese films of 2005 =

The following is a list of mainland Chinese films first released in year 2005. There were 260 Chinese feature films produced of which 43 were screened in China in 2005.

== Films released ==
Title	Director	Cast	Genre	Notes
About Love	Zhang Yibai, Yee Chin-yen, Ten Shimoyama	Wilson Chen, Mavis Fan, Yui Ichikawa, Misaki Ito	Romance	Chinese-Japanese-Taiwanese co-production
Beautiful Men	Du Haibin		Documentary	
Before Born	Zhang Ming	Liao Zhong, Xu Baihei, Huang Guangliang	Drama	
Before the Flood	Yan Yu (director); Li Yifan		Documentary	
China Flower	Sang Hua	Yang Zi, Carman Lee, Wu Xiaomin	Drama	
Dam Street	Li Yu	Liu Yi	Drama	
Eat Hot Tofu Slowly	Gong Feng	Gong Feng	Comedy	
The Ghost Inside	Herman Yau	Liu Ye, Barbie Shu, Gong Beibi	Horror	
Gimme Kudos	Huang Jianxin	Fan Wei, Wang Zhiwen; Chen Hao	Comedy	
Grain in Ear	Zhang Lu	Liu Lianji	Drama	
Huayao Bride in Shangrila	Zhang Jiarui	Cui Zheming, Zhang Jingchu	Romance	
Mongolian Ping Pong	Ning Hao	Hurichabilike	Family	
On the Mountain of Tai Hang	Chen Jian, Shen Dong, Wei Lian	Wang Wufu, Li Shusheng	War	2005 Golden Rooster for Best Film
One Foot off the Ground	Chen Daming	Li Yixiang	Comedy	
Oxhide	Liu Jiayin		Drama	2005 Dragons and Tigers Award winner
Peacock	Gu Changwei	Zhang Jingchu, Gao Weiguo, Lu Yulai	Drama	Grand Jury Prize at the 2005 Berlin International Film Festival
Perpetual Motion	Ning Ying	Hung Huang, Li Qinqin, Liu Sola	Drama	
The Promise	Chen Kaige	Cecilia Cheung, Liu Ye; Jang Dong-gun	Fantasy/Wuxia	
Rainbow	Gao Xiaosong	Chen Daoming	Period drama	
Riding Alone for Thousands of Miles	Zhang Yimou	Ken Takakura	Drama	
Season of the Horse	Ning Cai	Ning Cai	Drama	
Shanghai Dreams	Wang Xiaoshuai	Gao Yuanyuan; Yao Anlian	Drama	Prix du Jury winner at the 2005 Cannes Film Festival
Stolen Life	Li Shaohong	Zhou Xun, Wu Jun	Drama	
Sunflower	Zhang Yang	Sun Haiying, Joan Chen	Drama	
Taking Father Home	Ying Liang	Xu Yan	Drama	
A Time to Love	Huo Jianqi	Zhao Wei	Romance	
Waiting Alone	Dayyan Eng	Xia Yu, Gong Beibi, Li Bingbing	Romantic comedy	
You and Me	Ma Liwen		Drama	

== See also ==
- List of Chinese films of 2004
- List of Chinese films of 2006
