= Aigo =

Chinese consumer electronics company

Beijing Huaqi Information Digital Technology Co., Ltd
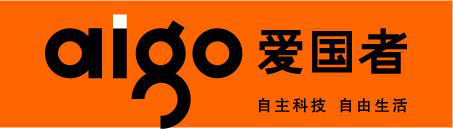
- Trade name: Aigo
- Native name: 爱国者
- Type: Private
- Industry: Consumer electronics
- Founded: 1993; 33 years ago
- Founder: Feng Jun (冯军)
- Headquarters: Beijing, China
- Area served: Worldwide
- Key people: Feng Jun (President)
- Products: Mobile Internet devices; digital storage (USB keys & hard drives); portable media players; cell phones; digital cameras; solar power chargers; MP6 (internet music platform); educational products
- Services: Digital music
- Subsidiaries: over 20
- Website: aigo.com

aigo
- Simplified Chinese: 爱国者
- Traditional Chinese: 愛國者
- Literal meaning: Patriot
Transcriptions
Standard Mandarin
- Hanyu Pinyin: Àiguózhě

Beijing Huaqi Information Digital Technology Co., Ltd, trading as Aigo (stylized as aigo), is a Chinese consumer electronics company. It is headquartered in the Ideal Plaza (理想国际大厦; 理想國際大廈; Lǐxiǎng Guójì Dàshà) in Haidian District, Beijing.

== History ==
Beijing Huaqi Information Digital Technology Co Ltd (北京华旗资讯科技发展有限公司) is a consumer electronics manufacturer headquartered in Beijing. It was founded by Féng Jūn, who is the current president, since 1993. The company initially produced keyboards. aigo may be participating in a trend that sees Chinese nationals preferring to purchase locally produced durable goods.

== Products ==
Aigo's products include MIDs, digital media players, computer cases, digital cameras, cpu cooling fans, computer peripherals,monitors and computer mouses.

== Subsidiaries ==
Aigo has 27 subsidiaries and several R&D facilities. An incomplete list of aigo's subsidiaries can be found here.

=== Aigo Music ===
Established in 1993 and located in Beijing, aigo Music operates a digital music service much like iTunes. The first of its kind in China, it is, as of 2009, the biggest portal for legal downloading of music in the country. Strategic partnerships with Warner Music, EMI and Sony allow a wide range of music to be offered at 0.99 yuan per song.

=== Beijing aifly Education and Technology Co Ltd ===
aigo set up this English as a Second Language brand with help from Crazy English founder Li Yang.

=== Beijing aigo Digital Animation Institution ===
An aigo subsidiary that specializes in 3D animated films.

=== Huaqi Information Technology (Singapore) Pte Ltd ===
Set up in October 2003, it operates two official aigo outlet stores in Singapore.

=== Shenzhen aigo R&D Co Ltd ===
Established in 2006, this Shenzhen-based research and development facility focuses on the development of mobile multimedia software.

== Sponsorships ==
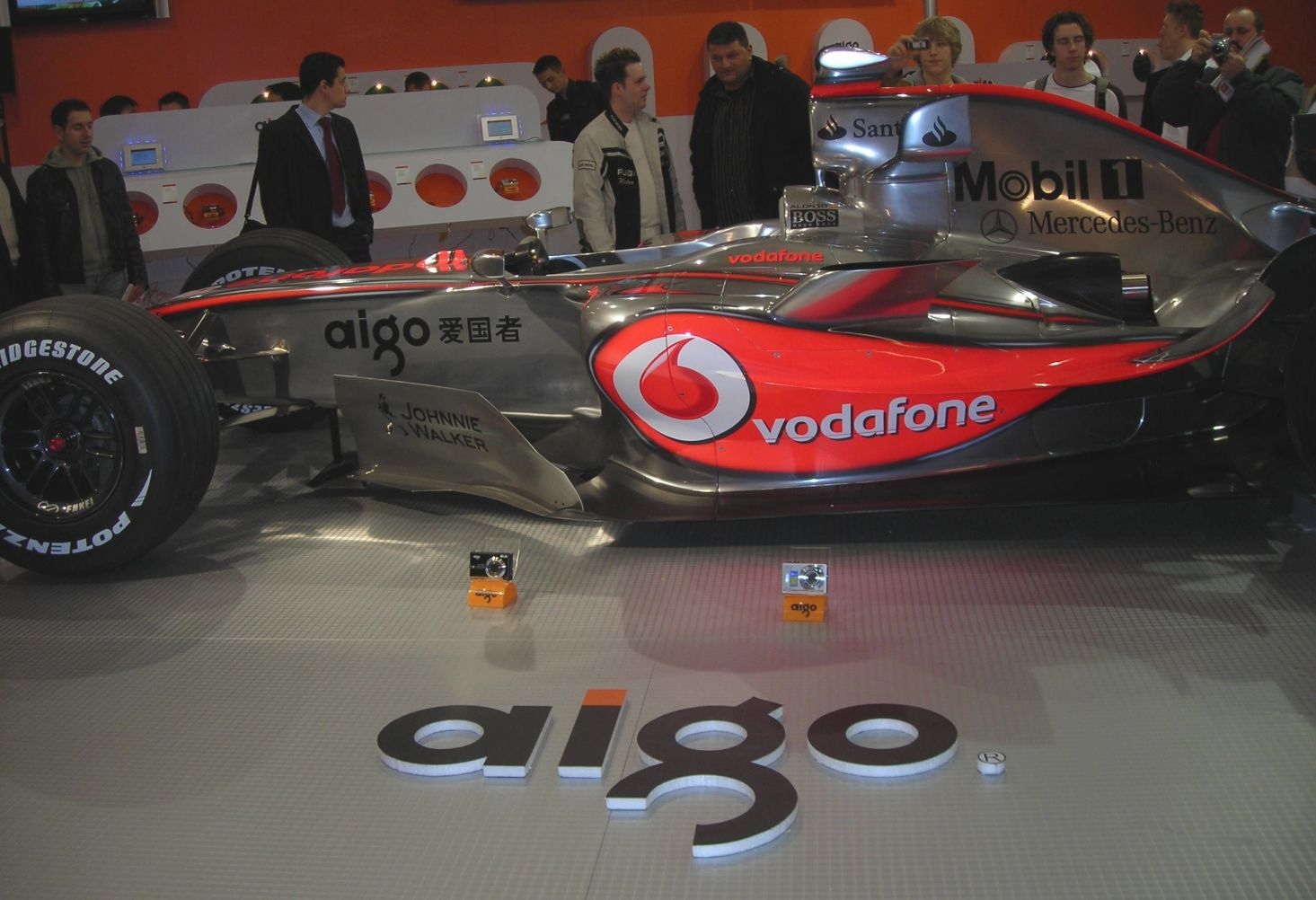
Fernando Alonso's Vodafone McLaren Mercedes Formula One car sponsored by aigo

aigo is a sponsor of a number of sporting events, the majority involving automobile racing.

=== Motorsport ===
aigo was an official partner of the Vodafone McLaren Mercedes Formula One team.

As of 2008, aigo sponsored Chinese driver "Frankie" Cheng Congfu, in A1GP racing.

aigo was an official partner of the 2007 race of champions, a racing competition that uses a variety of different vehicles.

aigo was one of the sponsors of Bryan Herta Autosports during Indianapolis 500.

=== Football ===
aigo, as of 2009, had a global strategic cooperation effort with Manchester United.
