= 2002 Shanghai International Film Festival =

Chinese film festival

The 2002 Shanghai International Film Festival (SIFF) was the 6th SIFF to be held and the second festival to be held on an annual basis. The festival was held between June 8 and June 16, 2002.

== Jury ==
- President: Li Quankuan (China) - director
- François Girard (Canada) - director
- Geoffrey Gilmore (America) - director
- Hur Jin-ho (South Korea) - director
- Jacek Bromski (Poland) - director
- Sergei Solovyov (Russia) - director
- Thorfinnur Omarsson (Iceland) - film critic
- Han Sanping (China) - producer
- Huang Shuqin (China) - director

== In competition ==
Title	Director	Country
All About Lily Chou-Chou	Shunji Iwai	Japan
Charlotte Gray	Gillian Armstrong	United Kingdom
Chopin: Desire for Love	Jerzy Antczak	Poland
Deadline	Colin Nutley	Sweden
The Fate as a Rat	Ivan Pavlov	Bulgaria
Hart's War	Gregory Hoblit	United States
Life Show	Huo Jianqi	People's Republic of China
A Little Monk	Joo Kyung-jung	South Korea
Lovers and Leavers	Aku Louhimies	Finland
Lovers of the Nile	Eric Heumann	France
Meeting Life and Death		People's Republic of China
Mullet	David Caesar	Australia
Station	Piotr Weresniak	Poland
A Time for Dancing	Peter Gilbert	United States of America

== Awards ==
=== Golden Goblet ===
- Best Film - Life Show (China)
- Best Actor - Colin Farrell for Hart's War
- Best Actress - Tao Hong for Life Show
- Best Cinematography - Sun Ming for Life Show
- Best Music - Takeshi Kobayahi for All About Lily Chou-Chou
- Best Director - David Caesar for Mullet
- Best Screenplay - Ju Kyung-Jung for A Little Monk

=== Special Jury Award ===
- All About Lily Chou-Chou
