= Chi Li =

Chinese writer (born 1957)

- 池莉
- Born: May 30, 1957 (age 69); Xiantao, Hubei, China
- Education: Wuhan University
- Occupation: Novelist
- Writing career
- Language: Chinese
- Period: 1986 - present
- Genre: Novel
- Notable works: Life Show; Comes and Goes; Don't Talk about Love

Chinese name
- Chinese: 池莉
Transcriptions
Standard Mandarin
- Hanyu Pinyin: Chí Lì

Chi Li (born 30 May 1957) is a contemporary female Chinese writer based in Wuhan. She graduated from the department of Chinese literature at Wuhan University in 1986. The setting for some of her stories is Changtangkou (长埫口镇) in Xiantao, Hubei.

In 2014, she participated in the International Writing Program's Fall Residency at the University of Iowa in Iowa City, IA.

== Works ==
Chi Li has written a number of novels, including the following:

- Life Show, a story about the owner of a small restaurant on Jiqing Street in Wuhan. The book was later made into a movie, also titled Life Show, starring Tao Hong and Tao Zeru.
- Comes and Goes, a story of extramarital affairs occurring in Wuhan. TV series of same name starring Pu Cunxin, Lü Liping, Xu Qing, Li Xiaoran.
- Don't Talk about Love and The Sun was Born, adapted into TV series Don't Talk about Love. Two antithetical families took totally different attitudes to their children's love.
- Good Morning, Lady, adapted to a 20-episode TV series of same name.
- Willow Waist
- Cold or Hot, It's Good to Live (冷也好熱也好活著就好), 1990
