= Yu Bo (disambiguation) =

Yu Bo can refer to:

- Yu Bo (Chinese: 于波), Chinese actor
- Yu Bo (politician, born 1968) (Chinese: 于波), diplomat of the People's Republic of China, Ambassador of the People's Republic of China to the Republic of Honduras.
- Yu Bo (politician, born 1969) (Chinese: 于波), Secretary of the CCP Yanqing District Committee, Beijing, China
- Yu Bo (major general) (1930.1-2006.2) (Chinese: 于波), formerly known as Yu Xichun (Chinese: 于锡春), a native of Weihai City, Shandong Province. He served as Deputy Commander of the Naval Experimental Base.
