= Qiu Shi =

Can refer to:

- Qiushi, a communist magazine,
- Qiu Shi (screenwriter), a screenwriter who works with her director husband Huo Jianqi.
