= 12th Beijing College Student Film Festival =

2005 film festival in Beijing, China

The 12th Beijing College Student Film Festival (simplified Chinese: 第十二届北京大学生电影节; traditional Chinese: 第十二屆北京大學生電影節) took place in Beijing, China in May 2005. Kekexili: Mountain Patrol was the biggest winner, receiving two awards, including Best Director and Grand Prix Award. Xia Yu won Best Actor for his performance in Waiting Alone, and Zhang Jingchu for her role in Huayao Bride In Shangri-la. Golden Rooster-winner Lu Chuan's Kekexili: Mountain Patrol won Best Director Award, and A Story of Dun Zi was declared Best Film Award.

== Winners and nominees ==
Best Film Award: A Story of Dun Zi – Pan Baochang; Kekexili: Mountain Patrol – Lu Chuan; Huayao Bride In Shangri-la – Zhang Jiarui; Autumnal Rain'' – Sun Tie	Best Director Award: Lu Chuan – Kekexili: Mountain Patrol; Feng Xiaogang – A World Without Thieves; Fang Gangliang – A Unique Schooling
Best Actor Award: Xia Yu – Waiting Alone; Wu Jun – Zhang Side; Jackie Chan – New Police Story; Zhou Xiaobin – Larger Than Life	Best Actress Award: Zhang Jingchu – Huayao Bride In Shangri-la; Jiang Qinqin – Sister Dictionary; Rene Liu – A World Without Thieves
Best Newcomer Award: Blue and White – Yang Zi; A Story of Dun Zi – Feng Jiaqi	Best First Film Award: Waiting Alone – Dayyan Eng; A Unique Schooling – Fang Gangliang; Two Great Sheep – Liu Hao
Grand Prix Award: Lu Chuan – Kekexili: Mountain Patrol; Yin Li – Zhang Side	Committee Special Award: Zheng Kehong – Silent Mountains; Huang Jianxin – Gimme Kudos; Shen Dong – Gunslinger
Artistic Exploration Award: Rainbow – Gao Xiaosong; Sister Dictionary – Jiang Qinmin	Best Visual Effects Award: A World Without Thieves; Huayao Bride In Shangri-la; New Police Story
Favorite Actor Award: Feng Gong – Eat Hot Tofu Slowly	Favorite Actress Award: Li Bingbing – Waiting Alone and A World Without Thieves
Favorite Director: Feng Xiaogang – A World Without Thieves	Best Child Actor Award: Wang Zhengjia – Electric Shadows; Wu Xu – A Unique Schooling
Best Comedy Film: Feng Gong – Eat Hot Tofu Slowly	Best Television Movie: Li Wei – Father and Son
