= List of Chinese films of 2000 =

The following is a list of mainland Chinese films first released in year 2000.

== Films released ==
Title	Director	Cast	Genre	Notes
Along the Railway	Du Haibin		Documentary	
Breaking the Silence	Sun Zhou	Gong Li	Drama	
Crouching Tiger, Hidden Dragon	Ang Lee	Chow Yun-fat; Michelle Yeoh; Zhang Ziyi; Chang Chen	Drama/Action	Co-production between China, Taiwan, Hong Kong and USA
Devils on the Doorstep	Jiang Wen	Jiang Wen, Kagawa Teruyuki; David Wu	Black comedy/War	Grand Prix winner at the 2000 Cannes Film Festival
Fatal Decision	Yu Benzheng	Wang Qingxiang, Liao Jingsheng, Zuo Ling	Drama	Co-winner of the 2000 Golden Rooster Award for Best Film
Father	Wang Shuo	Feng Xiaogang	Family drama	Golden Leopard winner at the 2000 Locarno International Film Festival
Happy Angels	Zhang Jianya		Comedy	
Happy Times	Zhang Yimou	Zhao Benshan, Dong Lifan, Dong Jie	Comedy-Drama	
I Love Beijing	Ning Ying		Drama/Romance	
A Lingering Face	Lu Xuechang	Ma Xiaoqing	Drama	
A Love of Blueness	Huo Jianqi	Pan Yueming, Teng Rujun	Romance	
Chrysanthemum Tea	Jin Chen	Chen Jianbin, Wu Yue	Drama	Also known as Love Story by Tea
Platform	Jia Zhangke	Zhao Tao; Wang Hongwei	Drama	
The Red Suit	Li Shaohong	Song Dandan	Drama	
Sigh	Feng Xiaogang	Zhang Guoli	Drama	
Song of Tibet	Xie Fei		Drama	
Suzhou River	Lou Ye	Zhou Xun, Jia Hongsheng	Drama/Noir	
Xi'an's Finest	Huang Jianxin	Sun Min; Ten Rujun	Drama	

== See also ==
- Cinema of China
- List of Chinese films of 2001
