= Beyond Our Ken (2004 film) =

2004 Hong Kong film by Pang Ho-cheung

- Film poster
- Directed by: Pang Ho-Cheung
- Written by: Pang Ho-Cheung; Wong Wing-Sze
- Produced by: Catherine Hun
- Starring: Gillian Chung; Daniel Wu; Tao Hong
- Cinematography: Charlie Lam
- Edited by: Wenders Li
- Music by: Wong Ai-Lun; Janet Yung
- Distributed by: Mei Ah Film Production Co. Ltd.
- Release date: 11 November 2004
- Running time: 97 minutes
- Country: Hong Kong
- Language: Cantonese

Beyond Our Ken (公主復仇記) is a 2004 Hong Kong film directed by Pang Ho-Cheung, and starring Gillian Chung, Tao Hong and Daniel Wu.

== Plot ==
The story tells about Ching (Gillian Chung), who was dumped by her playboy boyfriend Ken (Daniel Wu). She tracks down his new girlfriend Shirley (Tao Hong) and claims that Ken uploaded nude photos of her to a website.

== Cast ==
- Gillian Chung - Ching
- Tao Hong - Shirley
- Daniel Wu - Ken
- Jim Chim - Shirley's ex-boyfriend
- Emme Wong
- Jimmy Wong
- Anna Ng
- Wong Hiu
- On Yeung

== See also ==
- Edison Chen photo scandal
