= RMB City =

Virtual city

RMB City is a virtual city in the online world of Second Life, planned and developed by Beijing artist Cao Fei (SL: China Tracy). Launched in 2008 and open to the public since January 2009, RMB City is a platform for experimental creative activities, one in which Cao Fei and her collaborators use different mediums to test the boundaries between virtual and physical existence. As a laboratory for investigations in art, design, architecture, literature, cinema, politics, economy, society, and beyond, RMB City is constantly nourished by new and innovative projects, and supported by leading international art institutions and networks. As a model of avant-garde urban planning, it traverses the boundaries between past and future, real and virtual to link China and the cosmopolitan contemporary world.

In 2009, RMB City was a lab for both filmmaking and live theater. Cao Fei's first documentary film after building RMB City, The Birth of RMB City, took a dreamy and epic look at the city, showing how it was constructed, but also highlighting its fragility by depicting an inevitable demise. After this film was completed, she invited different artists to use various mediums to create different live artworks, and those works also became the life of the online city. Based on those creative actions, Cao Fei made two films in the video format: People's Limbo and Live in RMB City, both of which became chronicles of human experience in RMB City.

Cao Fei does not only investigate in virtual space however, and in 2009, she traversed boundaries to bring RMB City to the real life space by creating RMB City Opera. This stage performance brought the interaction and tension between real and virtual identities to light in front of an audience, by using both physical and Second Life spaces to set the stage for interaction between actors and avatars.

The running of RMB City is extensively documented on its official website.

== RMB City in RL (Real-life) ==
Throughout the "construction process" and actual operation period of RMB City in 2008, the Serpentine Gallery in London displayed its progress in a dedicated physical space. Since then, RMB City has been exhibited in museums, galleries, and institutions around the world.

Virtual institution- and individual collector-"managed" buildings inside RMB City will hold regularly changing exhibitions and events open to all Second Life users.

== Selected RMB City Artworks and Documentation ==
WORKS

- i.Mirror, Cao Fei, Video, 2007
- RMB City: A Second Life City Planning, Cao Fei, Video, 2007
- The Birth of RMB City, Cao Fei + RMB City, Video, 2009
- People's Limbo in RMB City, Cao Fei + RMB City, Video, 2009
- Fashions of China Tracy, Cao Fei + RMB City, Digital Prints, 2009
- Live in RMB City, Cao Fei + RMB City, Video, 2009

DOCUMENTATION

- RMB City Construction, Video Clips, 2008
- NO LAB in RMB City, Cao Fei + MAP OFFICE, Video, 2008
- Qi of RMB City, SL project by guest artist Huang He + RMB City / Video by Cao Fei / Co-producer: Kaai Theater, Festival PERFORMATIK 09, Brussels, 2009

THEATRICAL PLAY

- RMB City Opera, Stage Performance, Director & Script: Cao Fei / Commissioned by Arthub Asia, Produced by RMB City, Supported by DEPART Foundation, Curators: Davide Quadrio and Defne Ayas, 2009

== SL Events in RMB City ==
- July 14, 2008, RMB City Groundbreaking
- September 2008, "Play with Your Triennale"
- November 2008, "NO LAB in RMB City"
- November 2008, "Love Letters To Avatars" by Mian Mian (SL: MianMian Sorbet)
- December 2008, "Dream Umbrellas" by Man Michinaga (RL: Patrick Lichty), Gazira Babeli and Second Front
- January 2009, Institution Opening: UCCA in RMB City
- January 9 (SL time)-January 10, 2009, RMB City Grand Opening
- January 2009, "Master Q's Guide to Virtual Feng Shui" by Huang He (SL: queenshoe Voom)
- January 11, 2009, China Tracy on Treet.tv's "Tonight Live"
- January 2009, RMB City's First Mayor Ulli Sigg (SL: UliSigg Cisse)
- March 20, 2009, Interview Marathon at Serpentine Gallery
- April 2009, RMB City's Second Mayor Alan Lau (SL: AlanLau Nirvana)
- May 2009, "People's Limbo in RMB City"
- August 2009, RMB City's Third Mayor Jerome Sans (SL: SuperConcierge Cristole)
- August 2009, "Yak Horn: RMB City Guggenheim by Cao Fei (SL: China Tracy)
- August 2009, "Master Q's Medium Office" by Huang He (SL: queenshoe Voom)
- August 2009, "Wang Kuo-wei" by Hu Fang (SL: HuFang Scribe)
- August 25, 2009, "Never Real Sound" by Yan Jun (SL: Vacation Mint)
- August 28, 2009, "Revolutionary Pleasure Area" by Cao Fei (SL: China Tracy)
- August 28, 2009, "Second Life Tremors" by Neville Mars (SL: MARS01 Sheryffe)
- September 2009, "Fake Mountain" by jiang Jun (SL: JiangJun aboma)
- September 13, 2009, "New World Gala" by James Au (SL: Hamlet Au) + "Montage RMB City" by Trace Sanderson (SL: Lainy Voom)
- January 10, 2010, RMB City's Fourth Mayor Erica Dubach (SL: E3A Digital)
- January 10, 2010, RMB City's One Year's Anniversary

Virtual institution- and individual collector-"managed" buildings inside RMB City will hold regularly changing exhibitions and events open to all Second Life users.

== RMB City Publications ==
- "People's Monthly 01 Issue", ed. RMB City, March 2008
- "Cao Fei/China Tracy: RMB City Catalogue", ed. Cao Fei & Hu Fang, Vitamin Creative Space, Feb. 2008.
