= Yu Bo (politician, born 1968) =

Chinese diplomat (born 1968)

Yu Bo (Chinese: 于波; March 1968, Beijing) is a Chinese diplomat who is now the first Ambassador of China to the Republic of Honduras. Previously, he held the position of Consul General of the People's Republic of China in Tijuana.

== Career ==
Yu began working for the Ministry of Foreign Affairs in 1991 and has held a number of positions in the Department of the Americas. He worked in Bolivia, Peru, Cuba, Mexico, and Costa Rica, among other Latin American nations, at Chinese embassies. He was hired as a Counsellor in 2010 and a Deputy Official in 2012 at the Ministry of Foreign Affairs Office. The Department of Latin America and the Caribbean hired him back later. He was appointed Deputy Observer in 2014 by the Organisation of American States' Office of the Permanent Observer.

Yu oversaw the group assigned to repair the Chinese Embassy in Nicaragua in December 2021. He took over as team leader of the Honduran embassy construction in April 2023, and in August of the same year, he was named China's first ambassador to Honduras.

== See also ==
- Yu Bo (disambiguation)
