= Cry Woman =

- Film poster
- Traditional Chinese: 哭泣的女人
- Simplified Chinese: 哭泣的女人
- Hanyu Pinyin: Kū qì de nǔ rén
- Directed by: Liu Bingjian
- Written by: Liu Bingjian; Deng Ye
- Produced by: Jason Chae; Ellen Kim; Michel Reilhac; Deng Ye
- Starring: Liao Qin; Wei Xingkun; Zhu Jiayue; Li Longjun
- Cinematography: Xu Wei
- Edited by: Ying Zhou
- Music by: Dong Liqiang
- Distributed by: Mirovision
- Release date: May 19, 2002 (Cannes)
- Running time: 90 minutes
- Country: China
- Language: Mandarin

Cry Woman (Chinese: 哭泣的女人; pinyin: Kū qì de nǔ rén) is a 2002 Chinese film directed by Liu Bingjian. It was Liu's third feature film and like his previous two films, Incense and Men and Women, Cry Woman was not given permission to screen in China.

Cry Woman stars the Beijing Opera star Liao Qin in her first film role.

Despite being banned in China, the film was screened at several international venues, including the Karlovy Vary International Film Festival held in the Czech Republic and in the Un Certain Regard section at the 2002 Cannes Film Festival.

== Plot ==
Wang Guixiang (Liao Qin) and her husband (Li Longjun) are a migrant couple living in Beijing. Wang is eking out a career selling unlicensed DVDs when disaster strikes and police confiscate her DVD stocks, and her husband is arrested after getting into a fight over a mahjong game. Forced to return to Guizhou, she meets an old boyfriend (Wei Xingkun), who suggests she take a job as a professional mourner. Surprisingly, Wang finds herself very good at her new job as a "cry woman" and soon discovers that her talents are very much in demand.

== Cast ==
- Liao Qin
- Li Longjun
- Wei Xingkun
- Wen Qing
- Zhu Jiayue
