= Romance Out of the Blue =

- Poster
- 浪漫天降
- Directed by: Ning Ying
- Screenplay by: You Li Li; Ning Ying
- Story by: You Li Li
- Produced by: Zeng Yan; Xi Xi
- Starring: Xia Yu; Guan Xiaotong; Roy Chiu; Liu Zi; Cui Baoyue; Congo Pax; Zuo Li
- Cinematography: Sean O'Dea
- Edited by: Xi Chen
- Music by: Drew Hanratty
- Production companies: Beijing Avenue of Stars Production; Zhidian Pictures (Beijing); Beijing Zhonglian Chuandong Entertainment; Beijing New Film Association
- Distributed by: Zhidian Pictures (Beijing) 江苏安石英纳电影发行有限公司; Beijing Anshi Yingna Entertainment; Huaxia Film Distribution; Beijing Time Dawn Media; Guangzhou Star Explore Culture Communication
- Release date: 23 October 2015 (China)
- Running time: 93 minutes
- Country: China
- Language: Mandarin
- Box office: CN¥4.6 million

Romance Out of the Blue (Chinese: 浪漫天降) is a 2015 Chinese romantic comedy film directed by Ning Ying. The film was released on 23 October 2015.

== Cast ==
- Xia Yu
- Guan Xiaotong
- Roy Chiu
- Liu Zi
- Cui Baoyue
- Congo Pax
- Zuo Li

== Reception ==
The film has earned CN¥4.626 million at the Chinese box office.
