= Star Appeal (film) =

- Film poster
- Directed by: Cui Zi'en
- Written by: Cui Zi'en
- Starring: Bo Yu; Guifeng Wang; Xiwen Zhang; Jian Hou
- Cinematography: Zhang Huilin
- Edited by: Zheng Mao
- Music by: Jian Zhang
- Production company: Cuizi CV Studio
- Distributed by: dGenerate Films; Water Bearer Films
- Release date: 2004
- Running time: 86 minutes
- Country: China
- Language: Mandarin

Star Appeal (Chinese: 星星相吸惜; pinyin: Xingxing xiangxi xi) is a 2004 Chinese gay-themed science fiction film (first released for public exhibition in the United States in 2008), by Chinese film director Cui Zi'en. The film was recorded on video rather than film, using a series of long, static shots. The main characters are E.T. and his Chinese friend, Xiao Bo, and the film reveals the full-frontal nudity of both characters.

== Plot ==
Coming alone from Mars to the Earth, ET is brought home by Xiao Bo. Xiao Bo’s girlfriend, Wenwen, does not believe that ET is an alien, while Xiao Bo’s boyfriend, Xiao Jian, is simply skeptical. However, Xiao Bo is convinced of ET’s identity. He is very attentive to ET, enthusiastically showing him what the Earth looks like. In order to distract Xiao Bo from ET, Wenwen masquerades as someone from Jupiter. Her plan doesn’t work, however, so to get revenge, Xinxin declares that she’ll have a mixed Earthling-Martian baby with ET. She brings ET home, teasing him and trying to persuade him to have a baby with her, but instead, ET ends up losing consciousness. Coming to his rescue, Xiao Bo inadvertently utters “I love you”, a phrase also used by Martians. Upon hearing this, ET recovers consciousness. ET used to survive merely on sunlight, never taking any food or drink. It is for Xiao Bo’s sake that ET tastes coffee for the first time. He gradually experiences various aspects of life on Earth, learning how to love as well as what the physical limitations of humans are. On the eve of his return to Mars, ET uses the same ultimate human way of expressing love, and has sex with Xiao Bo. Through this, he dedicates his Martian love to Xiao Bo. Not long after ET has left Earth, Xiao Bo, who was “infected” by a certain Martian quality during sex, returns to where they first met, and discovers the way to Mars.

== Cast ==
- Yu Bo ... Xiao Bo
- Guifeng Wang ... E.T. (as Gui Feng Wang)
- Xiwen Zhang ... Wen Wen (as Xi Wen Zhang)
- Jian Hou ... Xiao Jian

== See also ==
- List of Chinese films of 2004
- List of lesbian, gay, bisexual or transgender-related films
- List of lesbian, gay, bisexual, or transgender-related films by storyline
- Nudity in film (East Asian cinema since 1929)
