= Guan Xuezeng =

Chinese actor (1922-2006)

- 关学曾
- Born: 1 August 1922; Beijing, Republic of China
- Died: 27 September 2006 (aged 84); Beijing, People's Republic of China
- Occupations: Actor, singer
- Years active: 1930s–2003
- Political party: Chinese Communist Party
- Children: 1 (son)
- Relatives: Guan Xiaotong (granddaughter)
- Family: Gūwalgiya Hala
- Awards: (See below)

Chinese name
- Traditional Chinese: 關學曾
- Simplified Chinese: 关学曾
Transcriptions
Standard Mandarin
- Hanyu Pinyin: Guān Xuézēng

Guan Xuezeng (Chinese: 关学曾; pinyin: Guān Xuézēng) (1 August 1922 – 27 September 2006) was a Chinese performing artist, renowned as the founder of folk art Beijing qinshu. He also served as chairman of the Beijing Quyi Artists Association.

== Early life ==
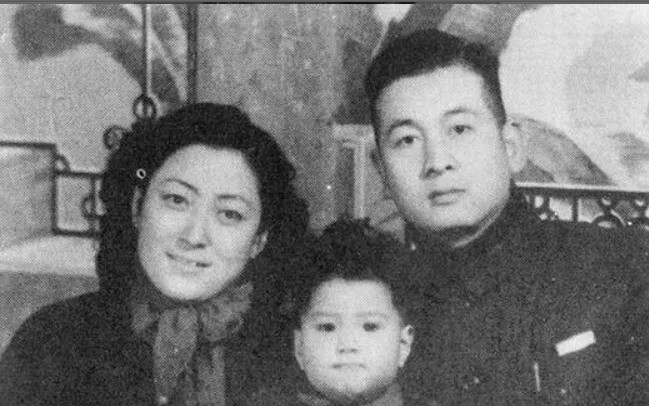
Guan with his parents

Born on 1 August 1922 in Beijing to a family of Manchu ethnicity, Guan worked as a child laborer in a foreign goods wholesale shop where he learned to make zippers, at the age of 11. His passion for storytelling was nurtured by his father’s recitations of classic Chinese tales and frequent visits to teahouses, where he memorized the performances of local artists. At the age 14, he began formal training in Danqin dagu and Yuexi dagu.

== Career ==
At the age 14, Guan debuted at Longfu Temple in Beijing, performing Miss Liang Picking Cotton. By the age 16, he was singing epic talesin Beijing’s teahouses, theaters and temple fairs.

Following the capture of Beijing by the Chinese People's Liberation Army during the Chinese Civil War in 1949, he joined a training program organized by the Beijing Cultural Committee, where he was recognized as a literary worker, earning societal respect. He began creating qinshu pieces inspired by contemporary themes, including Wang Gui and Li Xiangxiang, Shi Bulan Driving the Cart and Testing the Goddess.

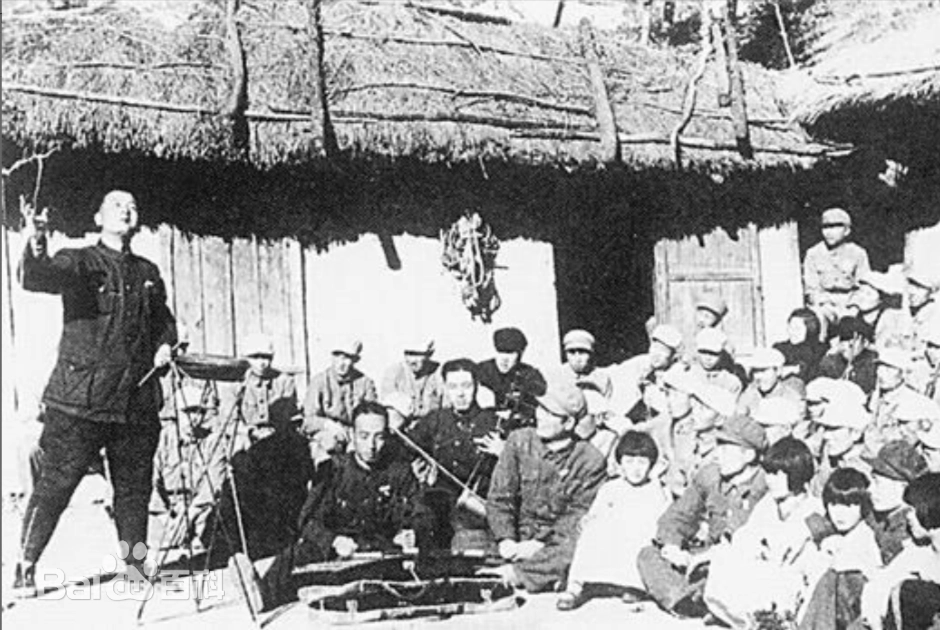
Guan performing for the People's Volunteer Army troops during the Korean War

In 1951 and 1952, during the Korean War, Guan performed for the soldiers of the People's Volunteer Army. His works, such as Model Soldier Jiang Shifu and Shang Guanghe Captures a Spy were performed despite the threats of American airstrikes during the war. Exposure to regional qinshu styles during these tours inspired Guan and his accompanist Wu Changbao to formalize Beijing qinshu as a distinct art form. Guan innovated its structure, lyrics and musical accompaniment, giving it a unique Beijing identity.

Joining the Chinese Communist Party in 1961, Guan dedicated himself to Beijing qinshu, creating over 220 original pieces out of the 1000 he performed. In the 1980s, he introduced the concept of “five-minute art”, producing short, impactful works like Longevity Village and Scared of the Wife Village. After retiring from the Beijing Quyi Troupe in 1984, he served as chairman and honorary chairman of the Beijing Quyi Artists Association from 1988 to 2003, revitalizing the organization. In 1996, he pioneered traditional arts programs in schools, a movement that spread nationwide.

In 1997, Guan’s performance in the soundtrack of Zhang Yimou’s film Keep Cool earned him the nickname “Mou’s Man” for its authentic Beijing theme.

== Personal life ==
In his early twenties, while performing near the Drum Tower in Beijing, Guan met his wife through a matchmaker. She predeceased him. Their son, Guan Shaozeng, became an actor and president of the Beijing Qinshu Research Association. Their granddaughter, Guan Xiaotong, is a well-known Chinese actress who is considered as one of the Four Dan actresses.

He died in 27 September 2006, at the age of 84.

== Awards and honors ==
- 2006 – Lifetime Achievement Award, China Quyi Peony Awards
- 2006 – Model of Virtue and Artistry, Beijing Federation of Literary and Art Circles
- 2003 – Winner of the 4th China Gold Record Award (Music Category)
- 2000 – Special Contribution Artist in 50 Years of New China Quyi

== Major works ==
- Whipping the Reed Flowers (鞭打芦花)
- Eating Noodles (吃面条)
- Robbing the Imperial Coffin (劫皇杠)
- Premier Zhou Lives Forever in Our Hearts (周总理永远活在我们心间)
- Gao Liang Fetches Water (高亮赶水)
- Yang Bajie’s Spring Outing (杨八姐游春)
- A Floral Blouse (一件花上衣)
- Haircut (剃头)
- Longevity Village (长寿村)
- Longevity Garden (长寿园)
- Sending the Military Flag (送军旗)
- Courtesy Demands Reciprocity (礼尚往来)
- Father and Son Deliver Grain (父子送粮)
- Clever Bombing of Ammunition (智炸军火)
- A Fortunate Encounter (巧相逢)
- Passing Through Shanghai (路过上海)
- Zhang Liang Accepts the Shoes (张良纳履)
- A Letter Sent Across Ten Thousand Miles (万里传书)
- Deep Affection on a Snowy Night (雪夜情深)
- Pan Deyuan (潘德元)
- Heirloom (传家宝)
- Buying Ground Meat (买肉馅儿)
- The Death of Cao Xueqin (曹雪芹之死)
- Little Windmill (小风车)
- Scared of the Wife Village (怕婆村儿)
- The Old Team Leader (老组长)
- Spring of Happiness (幸福泉)
- Su Dongpo and the Little Sister (东坡与小妹)
- Exam Goddess (考神婆)
- Song of Loving the People (爱民曲)
- Speak Calmly (有话好好说)
- Wang Gui and Li Xiangxiang (王贵与李香香)
- Young Couple’s Banter (小俩口逗闷子)
