= I Love Beijing =

2001 film by Ning Ying

- DVD cover
- Traditional Chinese: 夏日暖樣樣
- Simplified Chinese: 夏日暖洋洋
- Hanyu Pinyin: Xiàrì nuǎnyàngyàng
- Directed by: Ning Ying
- Written by: Ning Ying; Ning Dai
- Produced by: Han Sanping; Wang Zhonglei; Ning Ying
- Starring: Yu Lei; Zu Baitao; Tao Hong; Wang Jing
- Cinematography: Gao Fei
- Edited by: Ning Ying
- Music by: Zhu Xiaomin
- Production companies: Eurasia Communications; Happy Village
- Distributed by: Celluloid Dreams
- Release date: January 5, 2001 (Rotterdam)
- Running time: 99 minutes
- Language: Mandarin

I Love Beijing (simplified Chinese: 夏日暖洋洋; traditional Chinese: 夏日暖樣樣; pinyin: Xiàrì nuǎnyàngyàng; lit. 'The Warmth of Summer') is a 2001 Chinese film directed by Ning Ying. It constitutes the third film in Ning's "Beijing Trilogy," a loose coterie of films detailing the rapid changes that have befallen Beijing in recent decades. In this final installment, a recently divorced cabdriver, Desi (Yu Lei) feels disconnected from the modern city of Beijing as he picks up fares around the city, all while engaging in a series of short-term relationships with the various women he meets.

The film was written by Ning and her sister and collaborator, Ning Dai, and was produced by Eurasia Communications and Happy Village.

The film's title in Chinese was originally meant to mirror the English title "I Love Beijing." Ning Ying's ambivalence towards the city's modernization, however, made censors concerned that people would interpret the title as sarcastic, leading to the altered title which translates as the "Warmth of Summer."

== Plot ==
With each entry into Ning Ying's Beijing Trilogy, the focus has been on a different generation: the elderly in For Fun, the middle-aged in On the Beat and now the youth in I Love Beijing. The film follows the twenty-something taxi driver Desi (Yu Lei) and opens on his divorce proceedings. Finding himself alone, Desi becomes something of a Casanova, and is soon dating a waitress, then a librarian, then a radio talk show host. Each woman, however, lacks something he desires. It becomes clear that despite his serial monogamy, Desi is really a romantic, and wonders when he will find the love of his life in the rapidly changing city he lives in.

== Style ==
Like Ning's earlier films, which were sometimes described as "cinéma vérité" in both camera work and the use of non-professional actors, I Love Beijing uses a naturalistic filming style. This can be seen in the cinematography of Gao Fei, which Variety noted created "casual yet revealing glimpses in long, seductive sequences that recall stylistically the work of Chantal Akerman."

The film's climactic scene in the night club "Maxim's" was also improvised. Ning sent invitations out to much of Beijing's young, successful population to attend a party but never specifically stated that it was for the purposes of filming a scene. The scene, however, was found to be overly long leading one reviewer to claim that it brought the film "to a dead halt". The negative reaction would lead Ning to edit it out almost entirely in the month before the film's premiere in Berlin.

As a result, there are two versions of the film. The version screened at the 2001 International Film Festival Rotterdam ran 99 minutes, while the version that screened in Berlin the following month clocked in at only 79 minutes.

== DVD release ==
I Love Beijing was released on Region 1 DVD for North American markets on October 28, 2008, by Facets Multi-Media.
