= Warm Spring =

Warm Spring 暖春
- Directed by: Wulan Tana
- Written by: Wulan Tana
- Produced by: Shui He Li
- Starring: Tian Chengren; Qi Ruyi; Zhang Yan; Hao Yang; Yu Weijie
- Cinematography: Lei Zhi
- Edited by: Zhou Xinxia
- Release date: 2003
- Running time: 100 min.
- Country: China
- Language: Mandarin

Warm Spring (Chinese: 暖春; pinyin: Nuǎn Chūn) is a 2003 Chinese film produced by Shanxi Film Studio.

Wulan Tana was the director and writer of this film which won her the Golden Rooster Award for Best Directorial Debut in 2003. The film was also named one of three Best Films at the 2004 Hundred Flowers Awards.

== Plot ==
Seeking refuge from abusive foster parents, 8-year-old orphan Xiao Hua runs away and finds safety under the care of a poor, illiterate old man from another village. Despite his lack of money and despite being taunted by friends, the elderly man does everything in his power to protect the young child he believes was delivered to him by fate.

Xiao Hua works hard and forms a close bond with the old man, whom she calls Grandpa, but the old man's daughter-in-law, who can't conceive, tries desperately to send Xiao Hua away. The grandpa sends her to school and gradually Xiao Hua thaws the hearts of the old man's son Baozhu and daughter-in-law Xiangcao. Toward the movie's end it is disclosed by the village head that the old man's son Baozhu is also an adopted orphan like Xiao Hua.

Years later Xiao Hua becomes the first college graduate from the village. She becomes a rural teacher to repay the kindness of the village which adopted her.

== Reception ==
As of 2012 the film has been rated 7.8 out of 10 in over 15,000 ratings on Douban.

Many cinemas promoted the film by offering refunds for any viewers not moved to tears; almost no refunds were claimed.

== See also ==
- Chinese films of the 2000s
