= List of Chinese films of 2004 =

The following is a list of mainland Chinese films first released in year 2004.

== Films released ==
Title	Director	Cast	Genre	Notes
Baober in Love	Li Shaohong	Zhou Xun, Chen Kun	Romance	
Brothers	Tang Honggen	Roy Cheung, Xu Jinglei	Drama	
Day and Night	Wang Chao	Liu Lei	Drama	
Delamu	Tian Zhuangzhuang		Documentary	
Electric Shadows	Xiao Jiang	Xia Yu	Drama	
Green Hat	Liu Fendou		Drama	FIPRESCI Prize winner at the 2004 International Thessaloniki Film Festival.
House of Flying Daggers	Zhang Yimou	Zhang Ziyi, Andy Lau, Takeshi Kaneshiro	Wuxia/Historical/Romance	Screened at the 2004 Cannes Film Festival
Jasmine Women	Hou Yong	Zhang Ziyi, Joan Chen, Jiang Wen	Drama	
Jingzhe	Wang Quan'an	Yu Nan	Drama	
Kekexili: Mountain Patrol	Lu Chuan		Drama	
Last Love First Love	Hisashi Tôma	Xu Jinglei, Wilson Chen, Dong Jie	Romance	China-Japan co-production
Letter from an Unknown Woman	Xu Jinglei	Xu Jinglei; Jiang Wen	Romantic drama	Best Director at the 2004 San Sebastián International Film Festival
Manhole	Chen Daming	Ning Jing, Sun Honglei, Zhao Baogang	Comedy/Crime	
The Master of Everything	Xin Lee	John Lone, Coco Lee	Action/Comedy	
The Parking Attendant in July	An Zhanjun	Fan Wei, Chen Xiaoyi	Drama	
Passages	Yang Chao	Geng Le, Chang Jieping	Drama/Road	Screened at the 2004 Cannes Film Festival
Pirated Copy	He Jianjun	Yu Bo, Wang Yamei	Drama	
Plastic Flowers	Liu Bingjian	Liu Xiaoqing	Drama	
Shanghai Story	Peng Xiaolian	Josephine Koo, Joey Wang	Drama	2004 Golden Rooster for Best Film
Star Appeal	Cui Zi'en	Yu Bo; Guifeng Wang	Science fiction LGBT-related drama	
This Unusual Vacation	Li Hong		Children	
Two Great Sheep	Liu Hao	Sun Yunkun	Drama	
White Gardenia	Jiang Lifen	Jiang Lifen, Wu Dawei	Romance	
The World	Jia Zhangke	Zhao Tao, Cheng Taisheng	Drama	
A World Without Thieves	Feng Xiaogang	Andy Lau, Ge You, Rene Liu	Drama	
Zhang Side	Yin Li	Tang Guoqiang, Wu Jun	Biographical/War	

== See also ==
- List of Chinese films of 2003
- List of Chinese films of 2005
