= Guan Xiaotong =

Chinese actress and singer (born 1997)

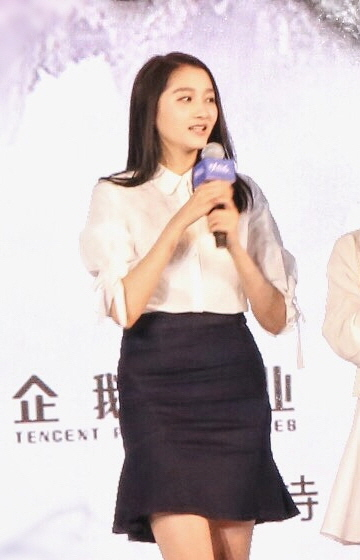
- Guan in 2016
- Born: 17 September 1997 (age 29); Beijing, China
- Other name: Gabrielle Guan
- Education: Beijing Film Academy
- Occupations: Actress; singer
- Years active: 2001–present
- Parents: Guan Shaozeng (father); Li Jun (mother)
- Relatives: Guan Xuezeng (grandfather)
- Family: Gūwalgiya Hala
- Musical career
- Origin: Beijing, China
- Genre: Mandopop
- Instrument: Vocals

Chinese name
- Traditional Chinese: 關曉彤
- Simplified Chinese: 关晓彤
Transcriptions
Standard Mandarin
- Hanyu Pinyin: Guān Xiǎotóng

Guan Xiaotong (Chinese: 关晓彤; born 17 September 1997) is a Chinese actress and singer. She is known for her roles in films The Left Ear, Shadow, and in the television series To Be a Better Man. Guan was twice named one of the New Four Dan Actresses by Sohu and by CCTV-6.

== Biography ==
Guan was born to a family of actors in Beijing. Her father, Guan Shaozeng, was an actor, and her grandfather, Guan Xuezeng was the founder of Beijing Qinshu. From an early age, her family encouraged a passion for the arts, and she first starred in Nuan at the age of four.

In 2016, Guan was admitted into the Beijing Film Academy after placing first in both the practical and written section of the Chinese College Entrance Examinations.

== Career ==
Guan first gained attention when she starred in Nuan, adapted from author Mo Yan's short story, The White Dog and the Swing. The film garnered positive reception from both China and Japan.

Guan rose to prominence as a child actress through Chen Kaige's film The Promise, playing the younger counterpart of Cecilia Cheung's character. She continued to build up her filmography, starring in television series and films.

In 2014, Guan received widespread recognition when she starred in the series May December Love, which received high ratings in China. She also starred in One Servant of Two Masters, which won her the Best Supporting Actress award at the Hengdian Film and TV Festival of China. Following the airing of these dramas, Guan was dubbed as the "Nation's Daughter" by the Chinese media.

In 2015, Guan starred in coming-of-age film The Left Ear, and won the Most Promising Actress award at the inaugural Gold Aries Award held by Macau International Movie Festival. She appeared in the Sohu romantic fantasy web short film Love of Magic, which received positive reception. Later, she released her first solo album, Eighteen.

In 2016, Guan starred in the family drama Papa Can You Hear Me Sing, a remake of the classic Taiwanese film of the same name. She then starred in the romance drama To Be A Better Man. Both series earned high ratings in China, and Guan won the Best Supporting Actress award at the Shanghai Television Festival for her performance in To Be a Better Man. She also starred in her first adult leading role in the fantasy drama Novoland: Castle in the Sky, and won the Best Actress award at the 7th Macau International Television Festival for her performance.

In 2017, Guan played the female lead in fantasy action drama Xuan-Yuan Sword: Han Cloud and romance comedy series Love of Aurora.

In 2018, Guan starred in the historical romance drama Untouchable Lovers as well as sports romantic comedy series Sweet Combat. The same year, Guan starred in Zhang Yimou's wuxia film Shadow, receiving positive reviews for her portrayal of a double-faced princess. The same year, she was cast in the fantasy romance film The Story of Turandot alongside Dylan Sprouse. Forbes China listed Guan under their 30 Under 30 Asia 2017 list which consisted of 30 influential people under 30 years old who have had a substantial effect in their fields.

In 2020, Guan starred in the female-centric youth modern drama Twenty Your Life On. The same year, she starred in the romance comedy film Oversize Love.

== Social activities ==
In 2017, Guan became the ambassador for "World Life Day", a joint campaign by the United Nations Environment Programme, International Fund for Animal Welfare and The Nature Conservancy.

== Personal life ==
On 8 October 2017, Guan and Lu Han, her co-star in Sweet Combat, admitted that they were dating.

== Filmography ==
=== Film ===
Year	Title	Role	Notes	Ref.
2003	Profoundly Affecting	Shuang Shuang		
2003	Nuan	Ya		
2005	Electric Shadows	Jiang Lingling		
2005	The Promise	Young Qing Cheng	Supporting role	
2006	Only Promises Keeps My Heart	Young Han Xueting	Supporting role	
2008	Uptown Girl and Donetown Girl	Xiao Tian		
2008	Save Me	Xiao Xue	Supporting role	
2009	The Treasure Hunter	Young Lan Ting	Supporting role	
2010	Spring Buds Blossoms	Nong Xiaomei		
2010	If You Are the One 2	Chuan Chuan	Supporting role	
2011	Summer's Latte Art	Young Girl	Cameo	
2012	Painted Skin: The Resurrection	Young Princess Jing	Supporting role	
2013	Switch	Xiao Yueyue	Main role	
2013	Flash Play	Middle School Girl	Cameo	
2013	The Dance of the Summer	The girl	Cameo	
2013	Personal Tailor	Adult Dream Girl	Cameo	
2015	The Left Ear	Jiang Jiao	Supporting role	
2015	Love of Magic	Princess An Jiexi	Web Short Film	
2015	Roco Kingdom 4	Princess Keli		
2015	Romance Out of the Blue	Sha Sha	Main role	
2016	Bad Guys Always Die	Chinese Girl	Cameo	
2017	Robosaur Wars	Long Po		
2017	The Founding of an Army	Deng Yingchao	Supporting role	
2018	Always Be with You	Cosmetic Doctor	Supporting role	
2018	A Paper Marriage	Wang Xiaoxiang	Main role	
2018	Shadow 2018	Princess Qingping	Supporting role	
2018	Surrender to Innocent Girls	Yao Lan	Main role	
2019	Lost in Love	Meng Li	Cameo	
2019	The Captain		Supporting role	
2020	Oversize Love	Lin Xiaotong	Main role	
2021	The Curse of Turandot	Princess Turandot	Main role	
2024	Inside Out 2	Joy	Chinese dub	
TBA	The Dream of Red Mansions	Jia Yuanchun	Cameo	

=== Television series ===
Year	Title	Role	Notes	Ref.
2004	True Love Forever	Jiang Aili	Supporting role	
2007	Another Lifetime of Fate	Young Meng Lijun	Supporting role	
2007	The Shadow of Empress Wu	Huaji Nana	Supporting role	
2007	Beautiful Life	Young Yan Yang	Cameo	
2009	Da Li Princess	Young Hexi	Cameo	
2010	Bridge of Life and Death	Young Dan Dan	Cameo	
2011	The Vigilantes in Masks	Chai Yan	Cameo	
2011	Confucius	Young Xiao Jiang	Cameo	
2012	Ocean Espionage	Zhou Tingting	Supporting role	
2012	Mazu	Young Lin Moniang	Supporting role	
2013	101 Times Confession	Zhu Beibei	Main role	
2013	Flowers in Fog	Young Xue Hua	Cameo	
2013	Aftershock	Su Xi	Supporting role	
2014	Romance of our Parents	An Yi	Supporting role	
2014	May December Love	Ouyang Miaomiao	Supporting role	
2014	One Servant of Two Masters	Yang Shumiao	Supporting role	
2014	Love at Jurrasic	Ge Jingjing	Supporting role	
2015	The Wife's Lies	Chen Puyu	Supporting role	
2015	Legend of Ban Shu	Jiang Xiu	Supporting role	
2015	Pretty Wife	Visa	Supporting role	
2015	Joy Fans	Princess An Jiexi	Cameo	
2015	Seventeen Blue	Kui Zhi	Supporting role	
2016	Papa Can You Hear Me Sing	Ah Mei	Main role	
2016	Hello Mr. Right	Lin Xia	Main role	
2016	Paper Restaurant	Ku Gua	Supporting role	
2016	Mr Hahaha	Nurse	Cameo	
2016	To Be A Better Man	Peng Jiahe	Main role	
2016	Novoland: The Castle in the Sky	Yi Fuling	Main role	
2017	Stairway to Stardom	Herself	Cameo	
2017	Xuan-Yuan Sword: Han Cloud	Ye Yaxi	Main role	
2017	Love of Aurora	Han Xingzi	Main role	
2018	Untouchable Lovers	Liu Chuyu	Main role	
2018	Sweet Combat	Fang Yu	Main role	
2018	Huotoujun Inn	Guan Tongtong	Cameo	
2018	Dagger Mastery	Shui Lian	Main role	
2019	I Am The Head Teacher	Xiao Guan	Cameo	
2020	Shi Cha Hai	Zhuang Xiaoxiao	Main role	
2020	Twenty Your Life On	Liang Shuang	Main role	
2020	Nothing But Thirty	Liang Shuang	Cameo	
2021	A Girl Like Me	Ban Hua	Main role	
2021	Dreams and Glory	Liu Siqi	Supporting role	
2022	Twenty Your Life On 2	Liang Shuang	Main role	
2022	Hu Tong	Lin Yue	Main role	
2023	Once and Forever: The Sun Rises	Old Xie Qiao	Guest role	
2023	Once and Forever	Xie Qiao	Main role	
2023	The Brightest of Us	Xu Man	Supporting role	
2023	Mr. and Mrs. Chen	Chen Jiaping	Main role	
2024	Romance in the Alley	Zhuang Xiaoting	Main role	
2026	Our Dazzling Days	Yan Xiaodan	Main role	
2026	Dazzling	Qing Ye	Main role	
2026	In My Prime	Qi Shi	Main role	
TBA	A Panorama of Rivers and Mountains	Dong Huiwen	Supporting role	
TBA	The Rebirth of Love	Su Zhiqiu	Main role	
TBA	Love You in the Dark	Meng Lusha	Main role	

=== Variety shows ===
Year	Title	Chinese title	Role	Ref.
2023	Natural High	现在就出发	Recurring member	

== Discography ==
=== Albums ===
Year	English title	Chinese title	Notes/Ref.
2015	Eighteen		

=== Singles ===
Year	English title	Chinese title	Album	Notes/Ref.
2015	"Princess An Jie Xi"	安洁西公主		
2015	"The Story Between You and Me"	关于你和我的故事		
2017	"Slow Movement"	漫动作		with Will Pan
2017	"Twenties"	都二十了		
2018	"Flower Day"	花期	Music Diary	
2018	"Kite"	风筝	Music Diary	

=== Soundtrack appearances ===
Year	English title	Chinese title	Album	Notes/Ref.
2015	"Song of Air Stewardess"	空姐之歌	Romance Out of the Blue OST	
2016	"Music Dream"	音梦	Novoland: The Castle in the Sky OST	
2017	"Bright Moon"	明月	Xuan-Yuan Sword: Han Cloud OST	
2017	"For My 17-year-old Self"	给17岁的自己	Secret Fruit OST	
2017	"Where you want to go"	想要去的地方	Dahufa OST	
2017	"Once Again"	二次初恋	Once Again OST	with Wang Yibo
2017	"You Have Never Left Before"	你从来没离开	Love of Aurora OST	
2017	"Don't Fall For Me"	别对我动情	Love of Aurora OST	with Zhu Xiaopeng
2018	"Lesson of Love"	爱情教会我什么	Surrender to Innocent Girls OST	
2020	"Us"	我们	Twenty Your Life On OST	
2020	"Tree"	树	Twenty Your Life On OST	
2021	"Wind Flower", "Drunk Happiness"	花信, 醉清欢	A Girl Like Me OST	

=== Other appearances ===
Year	English title	Chinese title	Notes/Ref.
2016	"Sunshine in the Eyes"	瞳孔里的太阳	Theme song of 29th World AIDS Day
2017	"Bringing Moonlight on the Road	带上月光上路	Performance for CCTV Spring Gala
2017	"Embracing You"	拥抱你	Theme song of 30th World AIDS Day
2018	"The Future Me"	未来已来	Theme song for China's Communist Youth League
2019	"Unlimited Imagination of Youth"	青春畅想	Performance for CCTV Spring Gala
2019	"My Motherland and I"	我和我的祖国	Project for People's Republic of China's 70th anniversary
2019	"Dream"	梦想	Theme song for China Student Television Festival

== Bibliography ==
Year	Title	Notes/Ref.
2015	用时间换天分 越努力越幸运	
2017	不知愁滋味	

== Awards and nominations ==
Year	Award	Category	Nominated work	Result	Ref.
2014	High School Affiliated to Beijing Normal University	Star of the Arts	—N/a	Won	
2014	1st Hengdian Film and TV Festival of China	Best Supporting Actress	One Servant of Two Masters	Won	
2014	3rd iQiyi All-Star Carnival	Television Newcomer of the Year	One Servant of Two Masters	Won	
2015	7th China TV Drama Awards	Best New Actress	One Servant of Two Masters	Won	
2015	17th Huading Awards	Best Newcomer	One Servant of Two Masters	Nominated	
2016	19th Huading Awards	Best Newcomer	My Wife is Born After the 80s	Nominated	
2016	1st Gold Aries Award	Most Promising Actress	The Left Ear	Won	
2016	Mobile Video Festival	Audience's Favorite New Actress	—N/a	Won	
2016	Sohu Fashion Awards	Most Popular Female Star	—N/a	Won	
2016	7th Macau International Television Festival	Best Actress	Novoland: The Castle in the Sky	Won	
2017	22nd Huading Awards	Best Actress (Ancient Drama)	Novoland: The Castle in the Sky	Nominated	
2017	22nd Huading Awards	Best Supporting Actress	To Be a Better Man	Nominated	
2017	23rd Shanghai Television Festival	Best Supporting Actress	To Be a Better Man	Won	
2017	Chinese Communist Youth League (CCYL)	"May 4th Medal"	—N/a	Won	
2017	11th Tencent Video Star Awards	Young Artist Award	—N/a	Won	
2017	9th Macau International Movie Festival	Best Supporting Actress	A Paper Marriage	Nominated	
2018	3rd China Television Drama Quality Ceremony	Most Marketable Young Actress	—N/a	Won	
2018	Weibo Movie Awards Ceremony	Most Anticipated Actor	—N/a	Won	
2018	5th The Actors of China Award Ceremony	Best Actress (Emerald Category)	—N/a	Nominated	
2018	7th iQiyi All-Star Carnival	Movie Breakthrough Artist	—N/a	Won	
2019	Next Generation Influencers for Global Philanthropy	Young Philanthropy Star	—N/a	Won	
2019	6th The Actors of China Award Ceremony	Best Actress (Emerald Category)	—N/a	Won	
2019	Jinri Toutiao Awards Ceremony	Trendy Artist of the Year	—N/a	Won	

=== Forbes China Celebrity 100 ===
Year	Rank	Ref.
2017	80th	
2019	81st	
2020	71st	
