= Nuan =

- Film poster
- Traditional Chinese: 暖
- Simplified Chinese: 暖
- Hanyu Pinyin: Nuǎn
- Directed by: Huo Jianqi
- Written by: Qiu Shi; Novel: Mo Yan
- Starring: Guo Xiaodong; Teruyuki Kagawa; Li Jia; Guan Xiaotong
- Cinematography: Sun Ming
- Edited by: Kong Jinlei
- Music by: Bao San
- Distributed by: Huaxia Film Distribution Company
- Release date: November 4, 2003 (Tokyo)
- Running time: 109 minutes
- Country: China
- Language: Mandarin

Nuan (Chinese: 暖; pinyin: Nuǎn) is a 2003 Chinese film directed by Huo Jianqi. The film won the Grand Prix at the 16th Tokyo International Film Festival. The film is an adaptation of author Mo Yan's short story, The White Dog and the Swing. The film is set in Maoyuan, a small and ancient village in Jiangxi. Nuan's production was delayed by the outbreak of SARS in 2002–2003, making it miss a planned debut at the Venice Film Festival that September.

== Plot ==
Like Huo's Postmen in the Mountains, Nuan is a rural drama. The film follows Lin Jinghe, a young man who, for the last ten years, has been living in the big city. When he returns home, he runs into his childhood love, Nuan. Years earlier, Nuan and Jinghe had been schoolmates. Nuan, the most popular girl in school, had fallen in love with an acrobat from a traveling troupe. When the acrobat eventually abandons her, Nuan finds herself drawn to Jinghe. One day, while playing with Jinghe, Nuan is permanently injured when she falls off a swing. Jinghe, seeing an opportunity to escape the small village heads to the city, but promises that he will be back for Nuan. Like the acrobat, however, he soon forgets about his childhood love.

Now, ten years later, he has finally returned. Nuan, however, has married a local mute.

== Cast ==
- Actor Guo Xiaodong plays Lin Jinghe, the country boy who has spent the last ten years in the city. His return to his childhood village drives Nuan's narrative.
- Li Jia plays the title character of Nuan, Jinghe's childhood love. Like Guo Xiaodong, Li Jia was a newcomer to the movie industry.
- Teruyuki Kagawa as Yawa. The veteran Japanese actor would go on to win the Best Actor award at the Tokyo International Film Festival for his role in Nuan.
- Guan Xiaotong as Ya, Nuan's daughter.
