= Ou Ning =

Chinese artist

- Born: 1969 (age 56–57)
- Education: Shenzhen University
- Known for: Film Making, Curating, Writing, Publishing
- Notable work: San Yuan Li (2003), Meishi Street (2005), Chutzpah! (2010–2014), Bishan Project (2010–2016)
- Style: Urban Research, Experiment Documentary, Socially Engaged Art, Rural Reconstruction
- Website: https://ouning.academia.edu

Ou Ning (simplified Chinese: 欧宁; traditional Chinese: 歐寧; pinyin: ōu níng; born 1969) is a Chinese artist, filmmaker, curator, writer, publisher, and activist. He is the director of two films, San Yuan Li (2003) and Meishi Street (2005), chief curator of the Shenzhen and Hong Kong Bi-city Biennale of Urbanism \ Architecture (2009), founding chief editor of the literary bimonthly Chutzpah! (Tian Nan, 2011–2014), founder of Bishan Commune (2011–2016), School of Tillers (2015–2016) and Isogloss Collective (2024–). He taught at GSAPP, Columbia University and worked as the founding curator of Kwan-Yen Project from 2016 to 2017.

== Early years ==
Ou Ning started writing poems and publishing underground magazines from 1986 when he was a high school student, then got involved in the Chinese Avant-Garde Poetry Movement in the late 1980s and early 1990s. He co-founded the poetry journal The Voice with the Hong Kong-based poet Huang Canran in 1992, later became a rotating editor of Modern Chinese Poetry, an independent poetry quarterly founded by Beijing misty poet Mang Ke and critic Tang Xiaodu in 1991. When he graduated from Shenzhen University in 1993, he shifted to the Chinese indie music scene and became a music promoter and critic. He published the underground music zine New Masses (1994-1995); organized live concerts in Southern China for Beijing rock musicians including Cui Jian, Tang Dynasty and other new bands; and organised the first tour performance in China for John Zorn and Yamantaka Eye in Foshan, Shenzhen, Guangzhou, and Beijing. In 1999, he published the journal Filmakers, founded the independent film and video organization U-thèque, and held weekly screening and discussion events in the cafes, bars, and bookshops in Shenzhen and Guangzhou. In 2004, he co-founded the Alternative Archive with the artist Cao Fei as their working platform in Guangzhou. Ou became the director of Shao Foundation when he moved to Beijing in 2008.

== Film works ==
=== San Yuan Li (2003) ===
San Yuan Li was commissioned by Hou Hanru, the curator of "Z.O.U.(Zone of Urgency)", 50th Venice Biennale, 2003, directed by Ou Ning and Cao Fei, produced with the members of U-thèque Organization. The 40 min black-and-white experimental documentary film with a soundtrack by Li Chin Sung (aka Dickson Dee) presents a highly stylized portrait of San Yuan Li, a traditional village within the surrounding skyscrapers of Guangzhou City. The film was exhibited in the 50th Venice Biennale, 2003 for the first time, with a publication, The San Yuan Li Project, then was listed in many private and public collections and screened worldwide.

== Curatorial projects ==
In 2009, Ou Ning was appointed the chief curator of the third edition of the Shenzhen & Hong Kong Bi-City Biennale of Urbanism\Architecture. With curators Beatrice Galilee, Kayoko Ota, Weiwei Shannon, and Pauline J. Yao, his full female curatorial team, taking the theme of "City Mobilization", Ou proposed an investigation into the organization and balance of social life within contemporary urban China. "City Mobilization", opened on 6 December 2009 and continued to 23 January 2010, the exhibition featured approximately 60 artists and architects from around the world presenting newly created works in Shenzhen.

As part of the Bi-city Biennale, Ou invited Rem Koolhaas and Hans Ulrich Obrist to host a non-stop, eight-hour interview marathon event at the Shenzhen Civic Centre on 22 December 2009, interviewed 30 of China's leading figures from the fields of media, economics, politics, planning, architecture, the arts, religion, science, and technology. The document of the interview was edited by Ou Ning and published as a book The Chinese Thinking: Rem Koolhaas and Hans Ulrich Obrist Interviewed China's Leading Figures by the Commercial Press in Beijing, 2012.

== Chutzpah! (Tian Nan) literary bi-monthly (2011–2014) ==
A critically acclaimed literary magazine, found by Ou Ning under the Modern Media Group in 2011, stopped publication in 2014 for mainly financial reasons. As the founder and chief editor, Ou Ning was invited to write an introduction to tell the story of Chutzpah! when an English anthology of the magazine was published by the University of Oklahoma Press in 2015.
