= San Yuan Li =

- Traditional Chinese: 三元里
- Simplified Chinese: 三元里
- Hanyu Pinyin: sān yuán lǐ
- Directed by: Ou Ning, Cao Fei
- Distributed by: dGenerate Films
- Release date: 2003
- Running time: 45 minutes
- Country: China
- Language: Mandarin

San Yuan Li (Chinese: 三元里; pinyin: sān yuán lǐ) is a 2003 experimental independent Chinese documentary directed and produced by artists Ou Ning and Cao Fei. Focusing on the modern paradox of China's rapid economic growth and social marginalization, the film was shot in Sanyuanli, a rural village nestled in the industrial skyline of Guangzhou. The film examines the effects of development on traditional agrarian lifestyles. San Yuan Li was commissioned for and exhibited at the Venice Biennale in 2003.

== Plot synopsis ==
Armed with video cameras, twelve artists present a highly stylized portrait of San Yuan Li, a traditional village besieged by China's urban sprawl. China's rapid modernization literally traps the village of San Yuan Li within the surrounding skyscrapers of Guangzhou, a city of 12 million people. The villagers move to a different rhythm, thriving on subsistence farming and traditional crafts. They resourcefully reinvent their traditional lifestyle by tending rice paddies on empty city lots and raising chickens on makeshift rooftop coops.

== Public screening history ==
- 2018, exhibition "The Street Where the World is Made", MAXXI, Roma
- 2018, exhibition "The D-Tale: Video Art from the Pearl River Delta", Times Art Center Berlin
- 2017, exhibition "Canton Express", M+ Pavilion, Hong Kong
- 2016, Chinese Visual Festival, London
- 2013, Chinese Realities/Documentary Visions, Museum of Modern Art, New York
- 2012, The International House, Philadelphia
- 2008, Uplink Factory, Tokyo
- 2006, A/P/A Institute at New York University
- 2006, Center for Architecture, New York
- 2006, University of Tokyo
- 2006, Kyoto Seika University
- 2006, exhibition "Contemporary China: Architecture, Arts and Visual Culture", Museum Boijmans Van Beuningen
- 2006, exhibition "Never Go Out Without My DV Cam", Museo Colecciones ICO, Madrid
- 2006, exhibition "Guangzhou: Cantonese Artists in the Sigg Collection", Kunstmuseum Bern
- 2005, Peabody Essex Museum, Salem, Massachusetts
- 2005, School of Oriental and African Studies (SOAS), University of London
- 2005, Michael Berger Gallery, Pittsburgh
- 2005, exhibition "BEYOND : an extraordinary space of experimentation for modernization", 2nd Guangzhou Triennial, Guangdong Museum of Art
- 2005, exhibition "Kunst und Film", Kunstmuseum Bern
- 2005, exhibition "The Wall: Reshaping Contemporary Chinese Art", Millennium Art Museum, Beijing; Albright-Knox Art Gallery, Buffalo; University at Buffalo Art Galleries
- 2005, exhibition "Follow Me! Contemporary Chinese Art at the Threshold of the Millennium", Mori Art Museum, Tokyo
- 2005, exhibition "Unspeakable Happiness", Museo Tamayo Arte Contemporaneo, Mexico City
- 2005, exhibition "Living in Interesting Times: A Decade of New Chinese Photography", The Open Museum of Photography, Tel Hai, Israel
- 2005, exhibition "Crossovers and Rewrites: Borders over Asia", World Social Forum 2005, Museum of Contemporary Art, Porte Alegro, Brazil
- 2005, 3rd Copenhagen International Documentary Film Festival
- 2005, 29th Hong Kong International Film Festival
- 2005, London Chinese Film Festival, SOAS, University of London
- 2005, International Short Film Festival, Alliance Francaise, Bangkok
- 2004, Taiwan International Documentary Festival
- 2004, exhibition "Die Chinesen: Fotografie und Video aus China", Kunstmuseum Wolfsburg
- 2004, exhibition "The San Yuan Li Project", Courtyard Gallery, Beijing
- 2004, exhibition "Tätig Sein", Neue Gesellschaft für Bildende Kunst e.V. (NGBK), Berlin
- 2004, exhibition "Traditions and Contradictions: New Video Works from Asia", Filmtheater't Hoogt, Utrecht; Argos Festival, Brussels
- 2004, Seeing China program, Nova Cinema, Brussels
- 2004, exhibition "Out the Window: Spaces of Distraction", Asia Center, Japan Foundation, Tokyo; Project Space Zip, Darling Art _Foundation, Seoul
- 2004, China Now program, Museum of Modern Art, New York
- 2003, exhibition "Fabricated Paradises: Artists from China", La Parvis Contemporary Art Center, Vidéo K 01, Pau, France
- 2003, MK2 Bibliothèque, Paris
- 2003, 10th Biennial of the Moving Image, Centre pour L'Image Contemporaine Saint-Gervais, Genève
- 2003, world premiere, 2003, exhibition "Z.O.U. (Zone of Urgency)", 50th Venice Biennale
