= Tian Chengren =

Chinese actor (1926–2020)

Tian Chengren (Chinese: 田成仁; 2 April 1926 – 30 January 2020) was a Chinese actor who appeared in more than 100 films, television dramas, and plays. He won the Flying Apsaras Award for Outstanding Actor in 1984 and was nominated for the 19th Golden Rooster Award for Best Actor and the 9th Huabiao Award for Outstanding Actor. He was best known for his performances in the television dramas the "Trilogy of Women" and the film Warm Spring.

== Biography ==
Tian was born on 2 April 1926 in Zhuanghe, Liaoning, Republic of China. He began acting in dramas in 1945, and joined the Liaoning Cultural Troupe in 1949, later becoming head of the troupe. He entered the director training program of the Central Academy of Drama in 1954, together with Ouyang Shanzun 欧阳山尊 and A Jia 阿甲.

Tian appeared in his first film, Red Rain (红雨), in 1975 and starred in the film Spring Light (春晖) in 1982. In 1984 he won the Flying Apsaras Award for Outstanding Actor for his role as General Chen Yan in the television drama Dao Shi Wu Qing Que You Qing (道是无情却有情). In the late 1980s, he gained wide fame for his role as the old peasant Maoyuan (茂源) in the television drama Fence, Women, and Dogs and two other series. Known as the "Trilogy of Women", they became major hits.

In 2000, he was nominated for the 19th Golden Rooster Award for Best Actor for his role in the film Golden Jubilee (金婚). Two years later, Tian played one of his most beloved roles, as Grandpa in the film Warm Spring, for which he was nominated for the 9th Huabiao Award for Outstanding Actor. In 2019, he appeared in the television series New Story of the Six-Foot Alley (六尺巷新故事) at age 92. He appeared in more than 100 spoken dramas, films, and television dramas in total.

Tian died on 30 January 2020, aged 93.
