= Eat Hot Tofu Slowly =

- Chinese promotional poster for Eat Hot Tofu Slowly
- Traditional Chinese: 心急吃不了熱豆腐
- Simplified Chinese: 心急吃不了热豆腐
- Hanyu Pinyin: xīn jí chī bù liǎo rè dòufu
- Directed by: Feng Gong
- Written by: Feng Gong; Cui Yanjun
- Starring: Feng Gong; Ding Dang; Ding Jiali
- Cinematography: Ma Delin
- Edited by: Zhou Ying; Zhang Dalong
- Music by: Li Tie
- Release date: 2005
- Running time: 93 minutes
- Country: China
- Language: Mandarin

Eat Hot Tofu Slowly (Chinese: 心急吃不了热豆腐; pinyin: xīn jí chī bù liǎo rè dòufu) is a 2005 Chinese comedy film directed by Feng Gong and written by Feng and Cui Yanjun. The film follows the emotional relationships of a middle-aged working-class man played by Feng Gong. It is set in Baoding of Hebei province, with dialogue in the Baoding dialect.

== Cast ==
- Feng Gong as Liu Hao
- Xu Fan as Yang Qian
- Ding Dang as Liu Xiaohao
- Liu Mei as Chen Hong
- Zhang Shu as He Wenlan
- Shen Junyi as Yao Yuan
- Liu Jiang as Grandpa Li
- Ding Jiali as Aunt
- Guo Da as the director of a hospital
- Guo Donglin as Zhang Qiang
- Li Qi as the guard
- Juhao as Doctor

== Accolades ==
Date	Award	Category	Recipient(s) and nominee(s)	Result	Notes
2004	12th Beijing College Student Film Festival	Best Comedy Film	Eat Hot Tofu Slowly	Won	
2004	12th Beijing College Student Film Festival	Students' Choice Award for Favorite Actor	Feng Gong	Won	
