= Railroad of Hope =

- Film cover
- Traditional Chinese: 希望之路
- Simplified Chinese: 希望之路
- Hanyu Pinyin: Xīwàng zhī Lù
- Directed by: Ning Ying
- Written by: Ning Ying
- Produced by: Ning Ying
- Cinematography: Ning Ying; Guo Guang
- Edited by: Ning Ying
- Production companies: Eurasia Communications; Beijing Happy Village Ltd.
- Distributed by: Tele Images International
- Release date: September 12, 2002 (Toronto)
- Running time: 56 minutes
- Language: Mandarin

Railroad of Hope is a 2002 Chinese documentary film directed by Ning Ying. The film was produced by Eurasia Communications and Beijing Happy Village.

== Background ==
Railroad of Hope consists of interviews and footage collected over three days by Ning Ying of migrant agricultural workers traveling from Sichuan in China's interior, to the Xinjiang Autonomous Region, China's northwest frontier. Through informal interviews aboard the cramped rail cars, Ning Ying explores the hopes and dreams of the workers, many of whom have never left their homes before.

== Reception ==
The film won the Grand Prix du Cinemá du Réel in 2002 in Paris.
