= Cao Fei =

Chinese visual artist

- 曹斐
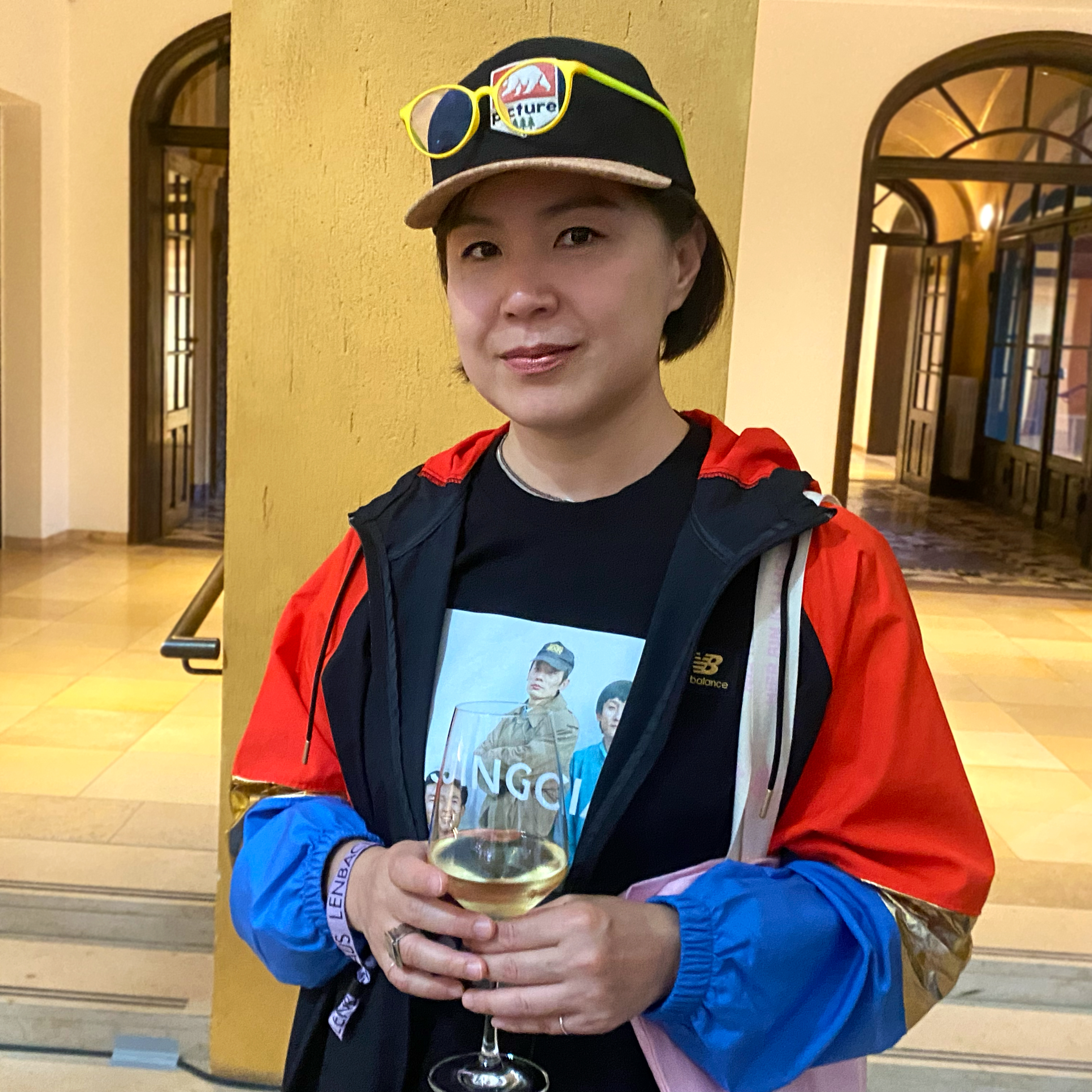
- Cao Fei in 2024
- Born: 1978 (age 47–48); Guangzhou, China
- Education: Guangzhou Academy of Fine Arts
- Known for: Video, Digital Media, Performance, Installation, Mixed Media
- Awards: Finalist, Hugo Boss Prize, Solomon R. Guggenheim Foundation (2010); Deutsche Börse Photography Foundation Prize (2021)

Cao Fei (Chinese: 曹斐,; born 1978) is a Chinese multimedia artist born in Guangzhou. Her work, which includes video, performance, and digital media, examines the daily life of Chinese citizens born after the Cultural Revolution. Her work explores China's widespread internet culture as well as the borders between dreams and reality. Cao has captured the rapid social and cultural transformation of contemporary China, highlighting the impact of foreign influences from the United States and Japan.

Some of her work is owned and displayed by The Solomon R. Guggenheim Museum. In 2021 she won the Deutsche Börse Photography Foundation Prize.

The Pérez Art Museum Miami, Florida, is featuring Cao's single channel video People's Limbo in RMB City (2009) in Worlds Apart, a digital media exhibition in 2025.

== Career ==
=== Early years ===
Cao received her B.F.A. from Guangzhou Academy of Fine Arts in 2001. During her time there, Cao presented her first performance work, The Little Spark (1998), set in the affiliated Middle School of Guangzhou Academy of Fine Arts. She then created her first film, Imbalance 257 (1999), which displayed the current generation's penchant for rejecting deep-rooted Chinese traditions. One year later, Cao produced another video work, Chain Reaction (2000). She described the film as "a view of schizophrenia", analyzing "the power of evil in human nature."

Still from Rabid Dogs (2002) at the Hirshhorn Museum and Sculpture Garden in 2022

After graduating in 2001, Cao produced several notable works, including Rabid Dogs (2002) and Burners (2003). Rabid Dogs featured actors wearing costume makeup to look like dogs working and interacting in an office. The actors mimic office work while also behaving like dogs, sniffing one another, fighting, and attempting to become sexual. The artist suggested that the work was a metaphor for the modern office, saying "We are surely a miserable pack of dogs and we are willing to act as beasts that are locked in the trap of modernization." The artist noted that Burners, a two-minute video focusing on the theme of human desire, "demonstrates the presence of privacy in soft porn and parodies the notion of male narcissism." Cao focused on the modern paradox of China's rapid economic growth and social marginalization, producing the 2003 experimental documentary San Yuan Li (三元里) with Ou Ning. Shot in a rural village nestled in the industrial skyline of Guangzhou, the film examines the effects of development on traditional agrarian lifestyles. The work was commissioned for and exhibited at the Venice Biennale in 2003.

In the photo series and video work COSPlayers (2004), Cao depicts Chinese teenagers cosplaying as anime characters in the industrial landscape of Guangzhou. The Internet's power to create subcultures across China influenced the artist greatly. In 2006, Cao produced her Hip Hop series (2006), an exposé of the underground influence of American hip hop in China.

=== Whose Utopia (2006) ===
The 2006 film Whose Utopia is one of Cao's most pivotal works. It explores the contrast between the everyday experiences and the aspirations of assembly line workers at a light bulb factory in the Pearl River Delta region of China. The film opens with shifting views of an automated production line factory workers performing menial tasks. The artist interviews various workers, asking them their reasons for working at the plant.

These conversations then introduce a series of performances. Each performance is a chance for the individual to showcase their dreams, fantasies and talents apart from their everyday life. Cao Fei explains, the film is "not about exposé and not about political correctness." Rather, she aims to look at the lives of workers from multiple perspectives. For the worker, the performance is an opportunity to escape and reinvent oneself against the conformist backdrop of the factory. Cao likens the practice to creating an avatar.

By using montage, music and imagery, she presents a thorough understanding of contemporary Chinese society. In recent years, Chinese migrant workers have flocked to factories to take part in the hastily growing economy. Whose Utopia suggests a perpetual disparity between the confinement of an industrial lifestyle and the individual utopia. This work is currently owned by The Solomon R. Guggenheim Museum.

=== Later work ===
RMB City: A Second Life City Planning No. 7 (still) (2007) at the Hirshhorn Museum and Sculpture Garden in 2022

Cao's art has extended to the virtual world in her three-part video i.Mirror (2007), where she documented the life of her avatar, China Tracy, and her romantic engagement with another avatar, Hug Yue in the virtual world Second Life. The videos feature China Tracy and Hug Yue in both realistic and fantastic locations, conversational excerpts, and the revelation of "First Life" identities.

In 2007, Cao planned and developed RMB City, a virtual city in Second Life. Launched in 2008, and open to the public since January 2009, RMB City is a platform for experimental creative activities, one in which Cao and her collaborators use different mediums to test the boundaries between virtual and physical existence. Collaborators were for example Uli Sigg, who received a virtual city hall or Rem Koolhaas. Within this virtual city art institutions could organize online biennales or similar virtual gatherings. RMB: A Second Life Planning By China Tracy was acquired by The Solomon R. Guggenheim Museum for its contemporary art collection in 2008.

From 2009 to 2015, Cao produced the works RMB City Opera (2009), East Wind (2011), Haze and Fog (2013), and Rumba II: Nomad (2015). In 2014, Cao presented a show and film entitled La Town at Lombard Fried Gallery. The show included the film and photographs from the set of the filming of La Town: The New Desert. The film depicts a world disrupted by industrialization. It begins in an elaborate, handmade, miniature city with a post-apocalyptic scene of a destroyed McDonald's restaurant on top of a small apartment building while figurines mill about in the rubble of wrecked cars and buildings.

In 2018, Cao filmed Prison Architect in Tai Kwun, Hong Kong, formerly a colonial police and prison complex and now a non-profit art centre. The film was inspired by the novelist and curator Hu Fang's short story The Consolation of Imprisonment, which led her to contemplate "how we live with the notion of 'imprisonment'—imprisonment in a physical cell, 'non-prison' prisons, and a prison transformed into a cultural centre".

In 2022, Cao was commissioned by the museum in progress to create a new work for the ongoing series of artistic interventions to the on-stage safety curtain at the Vienna State Opera. Cao's piece, The New Angel (2022), consists of a massive portrait of an animated avatar she designed.

== Exhibitions ==
=== Solo exhibitions ===
- COSplayers (2006), Para Site, Hong Kong
- Cao Fei: Whose Utopia? (2007), Orange County Museum of Art, Costa Mesa, California
- Cao Fei: Utopia (2009), Institute of Modern Art, Brisbane
- Cao Fei (2016), MoMA PS1, New York
- Cao Fei: Blueprints (2020), Serpentine Galleries, London
- Cao Fei, My City is Yours, Art Gallery of New South Wales, Sydney (2024–2025)
- Cao Fei: El futuro no es un sueño, MALBA, Buenos Aires (2024–2025)

=== Group exhibitions ===
- Venice Biennale (2003, 2007, 2011, and 2015)
- Biennale of Sydney (2006, 2010)
- Carnegie International, Pittsburgh (2008)
- 15th Sharjah Biennial (2023)
- Worlds Apart, Pérez Art Museum Miami, Florida (2025)

== Art market ==
Sold works include RMB: A Second Life City Planning No.1 (2007) sold for $16,128 at Sotheby's Hong Kong in October 2015 and Silent Curse (+3 other works), sold for $24,192, also at Sotheby's Hong Kong in October 2009. Others include Murderess (+2 additional works from the Cosplayers series), sold for $17,741 in 2009 and Mirage, sold for $21,890 in 2007.

== Awards ==
- 2010: Nominated, Future Generation Art Prize, Victor Pinchuk Foundation
- 2010: Finalist, Hugo Boss Prize, Solomon R. Guggenheim Foundation
- 2006: Best Young Artist Award, 2006 Chinese Contemporary Art Awards (CCAAs)
- 2021: Winner, Deutsche Börse Photography Foundation Prize, London for the exhibition Blueprints at Serpentine Galleries, London in 2020

== Notable works in public collections ==
- Chain Reaction (2000), M+, Hong Kong
- Rabid Dogs (2002), Asia Society Museum, New York
- Hip Hop - Guangzhou (2003), Mori Art Museum, Tokyo
- San Yuan Li (2003), M+, Hong Kong
- COSplayers (2004), Astrup Fearnley Museum of Modern Art, Oslo; and Musée d'Art Moderne de Paris
- Whose Utopia (2006), M+, Hong Kong; Museum of Modern Art, New York; Solomon R. Guggenheim Museum, New York; and Tate, London
- i.Mirror by China Tracy (AKA: Cao Fei) Second Life Documentary Film (2007), Asia Society Museum, New York; Museum of Modern Art, New York; and Walker Art Center, Minneapolis
- RMB City: A Second Life City Planning by China Tracy (AKA: Cao Fei) (2007), Solomon R. Guggenheim Museum, New York
- RMB City (2007-2011), M+, Hong Kong
- "People’s Limbo in RMB City" (2009), Pérez Art Museum Miami, Florida
- Haze and Fog (2013), M+, Hong Kong; and Musée National d'Art Moderne, Centre Pompidou, Paris
- La Town (2017), University of Salford, Salford, England
- Asia One (2018), Solomon R. Guggenheim Museum, New York

== General references ==
- "Cao Fei: The New Angel - Announcements - e-flux". www.e-flux.com.
