= Huang Guangliang =

Chinese association football player

Personal information
- Date of birth: 18 February 1999 (age 27)
- Height: 1.76 m (5 ft 9 in)
- Position: Midfielder

Team information
- Current team: Guangdong Mingtu
- Number: 6

Youth career
- –2020: Guangzhou Evergrande

Senior career*
Years	Team	Apps	(Gls)
2020–2023	Guangzhou FC	21	(0)
2024	Jiangxi Dark Horse Junior	4	(0)
2024–	Guangdong Mingtu	38	(0)
- * Club domestic league appearances and goals as of 14:01, 15 January 2022 (UTC)

Huang Guangliang (Chinese: 黄光亮; born 18 February 1999) is a Chinese footballer currently playing as a midfielder for China League Two club Guangdong Mingtu

== Career statistics ==
=== Club ===
As of 15 January 2022.

Club	Season	League			Cup		Continental		Other		Total	
Club	Season	Division	Apps	Goals	Apps	Goals	Apps	Goals	Apps	Goals	Apps	Goals
Guangzhou	2020	Chinese Super League	0	0	1 (Note: Appearances in the Chinese FA Cup)	0	0	0	0	0	1	0
Guangzhou	2021	Chinese Super League	0	0	0	0	1 (Note: Appearances in the AFC Champions League)	0	0	0	1	0
Career total			0	0	1	0	1	0	0	0	2	0
