= List of Chinese films of 2027 =

The following is a list of mainland Chinese films first released in year 2027.

== Released ==
=== January–March ===
Opening		Title	Director(s)	Cast	Genre	Ref.
F E B R U A R Y	6	The Wandering Earth 3	Frant Gwo	Wu Jing, Andy Lau, Li Xuejian, Shen Teng, Qu Chuxiao, Zhao Jinmai, Tong Liya, Li Guangjie, Sha Yi, Ning Li, Wang Zhi, Zhu Yanmanzi	Science fiction	
F E B R U A R Y	6	Boonie Bears: Inseparable	Ma Kangjie; Qu Caijia	Zhang Wei, Zhang Bingjun, Tan Xiao	Animated	
M A R C H	8	Daughter of the River	Hong Ying	Wang Xiaoxi, Jiang Yujie, Hong Ying, Shuang Bai, Ding Shengfei, Zou Zhiyong, Hu Guangzi, Yao Wei	Documentary drama	
M A R C H	14	Monkey King: A Hero's Journey to the West	Phil Nibbelink	TBA	Animated	
M A R C H	TBA	Flowers Bloom Again	Xi Dao	Song Ge, Xing Yun, Li Shu, Deng Gang, Liu Fang	Drama	

=== April–June ===
Opening		Title	Director(s)	Cast	Genre	Ref.
A P R I L	5	Red Wedding Dress: Embroidered Shoes	Liu Mingliang	Wang Keru, Xie Hongtao	Horror thriller	
M A Y	1	Hancheng Zhao Zihao	Jiang Xiaoqi	Zuo Tengyun, Li Ang, Shao Xi, Ji Ta, Bao Dazhi, Yu Xintian, Wang Peigen, Bai Jinbo, Wu Shiyuan	Folklore	
M A Y	TBA	Chasing the Rainbow After the Rain	Deng Andong	Zhang Xinyue, Luo Xiang, Wang Junjun, Xiong Naijin, Huang Haibing, Siqin Gaowa, Li Simin, Qiu Hairong, Chen Qianduo, Sun Tianai, Jing Yao, Xu Yunhan	Drama	
J U N E	26	Falcon Storm	TBA	Li Jingyi, Liu Yitong, Liu Xu, Kong Liang	Realistic crime	

=== July-September ===
Opening		Title	Director(s)	Cast	Genre	Ref.
J U L Y	7	Against the Wind	TBA	Xu Weizhou, Kan Qingzi	Historical drama	
A U G U S T	1	Blooming	Chen Li	Zhang Yixing, Zhang Yishan, Hou Yong, Wang Renjun, Wang Zhifei, Chi Xingkai	War drama	
S E P T E M B E R	TBA	That Mountain, That Water, That Person	Xi Dao	Guo Kaimin, Gao Qiang, Fan Yanhua, Deng Gang, Song Weizhi, Xie Dongsheng	Drama	
