= Rainbow (2005 film) =

- DVD cover
- Directed by: Gao Xiaosong
- Written by: Gao Xiaosong
- Starring: Chen Daoming; Li Xiaolu
- Cinematography: Yang Shu
- Edited by: Zhai Ru
- Music by: Gao Xiaosong
- Distributed by: Facets Multi-Media (DVD) (US)
- Release date: April 26, 2005
- Running time: 90 min.
- Country: China
- Language: Mandarin

Rainbow (simplified Chinese: 我心飞翔; traditional Chinese: 我心飛翔; pinyin: Wǒ Xīn Fēi Xiáng; lit. 'my heart is flying') is a 2005 Chinese film written and directed by Gao Xiaosong, starring Chen Daoming.

== Cast ==
- Chen Daoming as Xu
- Li Xiaolu as Rainbow
- Ding Yongdai as Sheng
- Zheng Jun as Yang
