= Crazy English =

Chinese English-learning brand

Crazy English (Chinese: 疯狂英语; pinyin: Fēngkuáng Yīngyǔ) is a non-traditional method of English language instruction in mainland China with a heavy emphasis on loud oral practice and the slogan, "by shouting out loud, you learn." Crazy English was created by Li Yang, who felt that English instruction in China was ineffective. It also includes techniques like repetition and recitation that are more traditional in Chinese education. Some school administrators in China have disapproved of Crazy English due to their belief that it goes against the cultural values of modesty and restraint.

== History ==
By 2008, for over a decade China had been gripped by the “English Fever” phenomenon as the country increasingly associated English language skills with success in the business world. Though China states that it has the largest number, 300 million, of English speakers in the world, the number of people who translate their reading and writing skills to spoken word decreases substantially. This issue with students not being comfortable or confident in speaking English opened the door for Li Yang's Crazy English method of teaching.

Yang, like many others, struggled with speaking in English. In preparation for his TEM 4 English exam, Yang found that while practicing English he would often time find himself shouting English passages and class exercises aloud; this made him more confident. After only four months of using his new method of studying Yang placed second in his class on the exam.

After graduating Yang started to work as an electrical engineer but also taught English in his spare time using his method of teaching English as a “shouted language”. He later quit his job in 1994 to start his own English teaching company “Li Yang English Promotion Studio" to promote his technique" which he named “Crazy English”. In the following years, Yang's method would gain popularity beginning after Ouyang Weijian, the leader of an elementary school asked Yang to teach for a crowd of about five thousand people, Weijian would later go on to join Yang's company as his business manager.

One major contribution to Crazy English's rise to fame was director Zhang Yuan's 1999 documentary Fengkuang Yingyu (“Crazy English”) which gained Crazy English attention, especially in the Western world. Crazy English popularity continued to grow causing more than 20 million people to sign up for a course. Eventually the Chinese government recognized Crazy English as a legitimate teaching method by allowing Yang to teach in Beijing, to teach soldiers on top of the Great Wall of China, as well as conduct Intensive Training Camps to prepare for the 2008 Olympics. Today “Li Yang English Promotion Studio" is a multimillion-dollar business that employs over 150 people with Yang still at the helm as director and principal speaker.

== Etymology ==
The name “Crazy English” comes from the fact that Yang's methods are so different from traditional Chinese classroom norms of being restrained. Crazy English goes against these traditions as the method utilizes physical and mental engagement. The word “crazy” is not meant to imply insanity but for Yang's belief that everything in life should be done wholeheartedly with passion and abandon. "Crazy stands for the single-minded pursuit of dreams. Crazy stands for the total devotion to your work. Crazy stands for the passion of commitment to reach the goal," says the course's guidebook.

== Methodology ==
Li Yang's unconventional method of teaching English includes screaming popular and random English phrases at a rapid pace and occasionally, involves hand movements in patterns that reflect the word's pronunciation. In a survey on Crazy English students identified Li Yang's technique as one which does not include grammar, vocabulary, reading comprehension, writing, or listening comprehension. In 2003, Li in an interview with Kripal Singh said, “[Chinese students] have no problem writing, they have no problem reading. That’s why I trigger their power of speaking.”

Since Crazy English highlights various aspects of learning a language without using any traditional ways like learning grammar or reading textbooks, pronunciation is the backbone of this methodology. Crazy English follows the International Phonetic Alphabet (IPA) as its standard for giving pronunciation notation. Li Yang employed several native English speakers to incorporate exaggerated American pronunciation in his lecture to develop conversation practicality.

Crazy English also makes significant use of gesticulation. Amber R. Woodward offers the example of Crazy English students learning ‘i as in like’ by making the right hand's index finger, drawing a complete clockwise circle; similarly, for ‘th as in three’ holding the right hand above the head, bending his hand at the wrist with a flat palm, and moving arm from right to left over one's head, also for ‘a as in made’ holding the right hand above the head, bending hand at the wrist with a flat palm, moving arm from front to back over his head. These gesticulations were ridiculed for not being consistent with the hand movements in his various lectures.

Li Yang chooses not to provide vocabulary lists or grammar notes for the words and phrases he uses. In his lectures, Yang sometimes translates English words or phrases into Chinese to focus on the emotion behind the word by reminding the audience of the Chinese translation to make the learning of the word faster. Crazy English uses simple forms of vocabulary and grammar this is why the translation in order to invoke feeling is not necessary every time. Crazy English lectures mostly contain English phrases and not full sentences.

The psychological aspect of the Crazy English method is related to its emphasis on improving speech. Students practice his technique by going behind buildings or on rooftops and shouting English. They also go to his rallies and shout together; this helps them overcome their shyness (everybody is doing it, so nobody is embarrassed). Li's frequently used slogan, “Crazy English! Crazy life! Crazy world! I love this crazy game, so let’s go!” signifies the method Li wants his students to adapt to this mindset in order to learn English in his way. The “Crazy” in Crazy English signifies Li Yang's want for students to have rage and passion in their studies and to fulfill their dreams by giving up their fear of failing.

== Advantages ==
Crazy English encourages students to shout out English words whether behind buildings, on rooftops, or at organized rallies. Shouting together with others helps people overcome their shyness, because if everyone is doing it nobody is embarrassed. In traditional Chinese hierarchies, youths are not encouraged to show a mastery of skills that surpass the skills of their adult counterparts. Li Yang's proponents argue that his method of teaching may help Chinese students get over their inhibitions to learning and practicing English. Li believes that most Chinese are brought up with modesty and a lack of confidence—that they are afraid of losing face in front of family, friends, educators, and even strangers. Common English teaching methods in China reflect this fear of failure and accommodate students by allowing them to learn English without practicing speaking, preparing dialogues, or giving individual oral presentations.

== Disadvantages ==
However, an opposer of Crazy English notes that Li Yang only says English words without giving any further details about the context in how, when, where, and what condition does one word should and could be applied. Another opposer comments that Li does not spend effort on structuring any cohesion between vocabulary or sentences; he assumes that students get enough of that in the classroom. Instead, he uses “crazy” sentences shouted at high decibels and funny hand movements to engage his audience in participation. In additional challenger also notes that students rarely – if ever – are presented with a situation in which they need just to parrot a native speaker. Another argues that because of Crazy English many students have come to believe that English has no standards which results in their English not sounding American or British.

== Controversies ==
In 1996 Yang's method became popular in Guangdong province against the will of the local English teachers. To counter, the local government prohibited Yang from giving seminars in the area for six months. Chengdu, Sichuan also banned Li from teaching for an extended span of time. Critics of Crazy English say that the promotion of Crazy English over the past 15 years has resulted in most students believing English has no standard, and that some even mistake American English for the standard one, which has made most students in China after 16 years of studying English sound neither British nor American. As a result, many are so confused with the two different kinds of English accents that they choose to keep their mouths shut. Critics also describe Crazy English as a technique only appropriate for certain situations — for example, a taxi driver who needs only a few sentences to communicate with English-speaking customers — but not as the main method to teaching students in a classroom setting. Critics note that although Li advocates fluency in pronunciation, his dismissal of fluency in content is slightly problematic.
