= Looking for Fun =

- Film poster
- Traditional Chinese: 找樂
- Simplified Chinese: 找乐
- Hanyu Pinyin: Zhǎo Lè
- Directed by: Ning Ying
- Screenplay by: Ning Ying; Ning Dai
- Based on: "Looking for Fun" by Zheng Jiangong
- Produced by: Cheng Zhigu
- Starring: Huang Zongluo
- Cinematography: Xiao Feng; Wu Di
- Edited by: Zhou Meiping
- Music by: Meng Weidong
- Production companies: Beijing Film Studio; Van Ho Film & TV
- Distributed by: Cinevista (US)
- Release date: September 10, 1993 (China)
- Running time: 97 minutes
- Country: China
- Language: Mandarin

Looking for Fun, released as For Fun in the U.S., is a 1992 Chinese comedy film directed by Ning Ying, written by Ning Ying and her sister Ning Dai, and based on a novella of the same name by Zheng Jiangong (which was translated into English by Jeanne Tai in 1989). The film is about a group of retirees in Beijing who try to find some sense of belonging and purpose by organizing a Peking opera troupe.

Looking for Fun won the Gold Award at the 1993 Tokyo International Film Festival, the Golden Montgolfiere and Best Actor (Huang Zongluo) at the 1993 Nantes Three Continents Festival, Best Director and Best Actor (Huang) at the 1993 Thessaloniki Film Festival, and Best New Director at the 1993 San Sebastián International Film Festival.
