= Teng Rujun =

Chinese actor (1946–2023)

Teng Rujun (Chinese: 滕汝骏; pinyin: Téng Rǔjùn; also credited as Ten Rujun; 1946 – 13 September 2023) was a Chinese actor. He appeared in Zhang Yimou's Red Sorghum (1987) and Huo Jianqi's Postmen in the Mountains (1999), for which he won Best Actor at the Golden Rooster Awards. Teng died on 13 September 2023, at the age of 76.
