= Li Yang (educator) =

Chinese educator and language instructor (born 1969)

Li Yang (simplified Chinese: 李阳; traditional Chinese: 李陽; pinyin: Lǐ Yáng; born 1969 in Changzhou, Jiangsu) is a Chinese educator and language instructor. He is the creator of Crazy English, an unorthodox method of teaching English. He claimed to have taught English to more than 20 million people in a decade.

== Biography ==
As a child, Li Yang was very introverted. From September 1980 to July 1986, he attended the Xinjiang Experimental Middle School. He entered Lanzhou University in 1986 to major in engineering mechanics. It was during his time in that University when he devised the language instruction method for Crazy English. He graduated in 1990 and went on to work for the Northwest Electronic Equipment Institute in Xi'an, Shaanxi Province. He continued to practice English using this method, often standing on top of the office building where he worked and shouting English.

In 1992, Li entered the English Station at the Guangdong Republic Broadcasting Station. In 1993, he became an English broadcaster and host in a Guangzhou TV station. Between 1993 and 1994, he was the special invited translator in U.S. Consulate General in Guangzhou.

He began promoting his method on a large scale until 1994 when he founded Li Yang Cliz English Promotion Studio. Today, his method has gained significant popularity in China, and Li himself has attained celebrity status. He lectures to crowds of 20,000 to 30,000, and visits an average of fifteen cities a month. The proceeds from a single lecture can gross over a million yuan. The idea of motivating millions of Chinese people with self-confidence and the ability to speak English were not initial objectives behind the founding of Crazy English. Far from it. The fundamentals of Li Yang's inspirational techniques for remembering English words (shouting the words out loud) were for purely selfish interests, that of allowing Li Yang to preserve some dignity after failing thirteen exams in his first year of study. The physical aspect of language figures large in Li's learning philosophy: "Any language is easy if you learn it with your mouth," he enthuses. "You cannot learn to be a successful swimmer in the classroom." In what Li refers to as "tongue muscle training", (a self-devised combination of listening, reading, speaking, writing, and translation, with grammar books put aside), he not only achieved the second highest mark in the school when he took the Level 4 National English Exam for collegie students four months later, but after presenting a lecture to classmates on how to speak good English, he founded what is today, the best known English language program in China. His company, Stone-Clitz, profits from his series of Crazy English books.

His personal motto is "stimulating patriotism, advocating national spirits, conquering English, revitalizing China." He is critical of the Chinese educational system and how it gives children a lack of confidence.

The 1999 documentary Crazy English by director Zhang Yuan followed Li on some of his travels. Li disapproves of the film and said that it misrepresents him. Zhang Yuan claims that the film is neutral and portrays him fairly.

== Personal life ==
In September 2011, Li was accused of domestic violence by his American wife, Kim Lee, also known as Li Jin (Chinese: 李金). Lee had posted photos of bruises on various parts of her body on Sina Weibo. While Li Yang at first did not respond to the allegations, he later admitted the accusations were true and apologized via his official microblog to his wife and three children. However, he also criticized her for discussing private things in public. On October 27, Li and his wife filed for divorce. The case gained national attention and raised discussions over domestic violence and was subject of a feature presentation on the TV program Legal Report. Li said he "wholeheartedly" apologised to his wife and three daughters for "committing domestic violence". He added: "This has caused them serious physical and mental damage". Mr Li's statement came more than a week after his wife, Kim Lee, posted photographs of her bloodied and bruised face on the internet, opening her husband to a barrage of criticism. "You knocked me to the floor. You sat on my back. You choked my neck with both hands and slammed my head into the floor," she wrote. She added that Li had only stopped after one of their three daughters intervened. Afterwards, she said Li had made a planned appearance on Chinese television as she was being treated in hospital. "Seeing that you were having make-up applied for a TV appearance while I was in hospital hurts more than you slamming my head on the floor," she wrote on Weibo. According to a national survey by the All China Women's Federation in 2009, one-third of Chinese homes have seen incidents of domestic abuse, with 85 percent of them directed against women. On July 26, 2014, Li converted to Buddhism at Shaolin Temple in Dengfeng, Henan.
