= List of Chinese films of 2001 =

The following is a list of mainland Chinese films first released in year 2001.

== Films released ==
Title	Director	Cast	Genre	Notes
All the Way	Shi Runjiu		Comedy	
Beijing Bicycle	Wang Xiaoshuai	Cui Lin, Li Bin	Drama	Banned in China, ban lifted 2004.
Big Shot's Funeral	Feng Xiaogang	Donald Sutherland, Ge You, Rosamund Kwan	Comedy	
Bus 44	Dayyan Eng	Gong Beibi	Short	
Butterfly Smile	He Jianjun	Ge You	Drama/Thriller	
Fish and Elephant	Li Yu		LGBT/Drama/Romance	Considered the first Chinese film to address lesbian issues
Go for Broke	Wang Guangli		Drama	
Gone is the One Who Held Me Dearest in the World	Ma Liwen		Drama	
In Public	Jia Zhangke		Short documentary	
Lan Yu	Stanley Kwan	Liu Ye, Hu Jun	LGBT/Drama	
The Marriage Certificate	Huang Jianxin	Feng Gong, Lü Liping; Li Xiaoming	Comedy-Drama	
The Orphan of Anyang	Wang Chao	Sun Guilin; Yue Senyi	Drama	Director Wang Chao's directorial debut
Purple Sunset	Feng Xiaoning		War	
Quitting	Zhang Yang	Jia Hongsheng	Docudrama	
Seafood	Zhu Wen		Drama	
The Sino-Dutch War 1661	Wu Ziniu	Zhao Wenzhuo	Historical	Also known as The Hero Zheng Chenggong
The Treatment	Zheng Xiaolong		Drama	
Weekend Plot	Zhang Ming		Drama	

== See also ==
- List of Chinese films of 2000
- List of Chinese films of 2002
