= Men and Women (1999 film) =

- Poster
- Directed by: Liu Bingjian
- Written by: Liu Bingjian; Cui Zi'en
- Produced by: Li Jinliang
- Starring: Qing Yang; Yu Bo
- Cinematography: Liu Jiang; Xu Jun
- Edited by: Ah Yi
- Music by: Zhao Jiping; Qu Xiaosong
- Release date: 12 August 1999 (Locarno)
- Running time: 89 minutes
- Country: China
- Language: Mandarin

Men and Women (Chinese: 男男女女; pinyin: Nánnán nǚnǚ) is a 1999 Chinese comedy-drama film directed by Liu Bingjian, one of China's few films regarding LGBT matters.

== Plot ==
Men and Women follows the travels of a young homosexual man, Xiao Bo, who goes to Beijing in search of a job. There he is taken in by Qing Jie, who not only gives him a home in her apartment, but also a job in her clothing store. While she tries to set Xiao Bo with her friend A Meng, Xiao Bo resists and eventually moves out when he is assaulted by Qing Jie's husband. He moves in with his friend, Chong Chong, with whom a romantic relationship is kindled.

Qing Jie, meanwhile, discovers that she may have feelings for A Meng, and decides to leave her husband.

== Cast ==
Men and Women was cast with openly gay actors.

- Yu Bo as Xiao Bo
- Yang Qing as Qing Jie, the cast's only professional actor (Yang had previously acted in Chinese television), Yang plays Qing Jie, who befriends Xiao Bo and gives him both a place to stay and a job at her clothing store.

== Analysis ==
Unlike earlier films like Zhang Yuan's East Palace, West Palace, Men and Women focused on the daily lives of its characters, rather than their underground existence in Chinese society.

== Production ==
The film was co-written by Cui Zi'en, one of the few openly gay writers in China. Cui also has a cameo-role in the film, as the host of an underground radio show.

== Awards ==
- 1999: FIPRESCI award at the Locarno Film Festival

== See also ==
- East Palace, West Palace, director Zhang Yuan's earlier film, often seen as the first Chinese film to have homosexual themes.
