= Postmen in the Mountains =

1999 Chinese film

- Film poster
- Traditional Chinese: 那山那人那狗
- Simplified Chinese: 那山那人那狗
- Hanyu Pinyin: Nàshān nàrén nàgǒu
- Directed by: Huo Jianqi
- Written by: Si Wu
- Based on: "Postmen in the Mountains" by Peng Jianmin
- Produced by: Kang Jianmin
- Starring: Teng Rujun; Liu Ye
- Cinematography: Zhao Lei
- Edited by: Gan Xinrong; Liu Fang
- Music by: Wang Xiaofeng
- Production companies: Xiaoxiang Productions Ltd. Beijing Film Studio
- Release date: October 12, 1999 (China)
- Running time: 93 minutes
- Country: China
- Language: Mandarin

Postmen in the Mountains (Chinese: 那山那人那狗; pinyin: Nàshān nàrén nàgǒu; lit. 'That Mountain', 'That Man', 'That Dog') is a 1999 Chinese film directed by Huo Jianqi. It is based on the short story of the same name by Peng Jianming (彭见明).

Postmen in the Mountains tells the story of an old man (Teng Rujun) who for years served as the postman for rural mountain communities. Retiring, he hands over his job to his son (Liu Ye), but accompanies him on the first tour. Together, they deliver mail on a 230 li (about 115 km) long walking route, into the rural heart of China and in the process the son learns from the mails' recipients more about the father he hardly knew.

It was filmed on location in Suining County and Dao County, in southwestern and southern Hunan. A portion of the film takes place in a village of the Dong people, including an evening festival featuring a lusheng dance.

== Plot ==
The film is set in the mountainous regions of the western Hunan province in the early 1980s. At the film's start, a young man (Liu Ye) begins his first journey as a postman at the mountainous rural areas of the aforesaid regions. His father (Teng Rujun), a veteran postman forced to retire due to a bad knee, decides to accompany him together with the family's faithful dog, Buddy.

The father walks his son through the nitty-gritty of the job, and the son realizes the mailman job entails not just the sending of letters. He witnesses his father's deep friendship with the villagers, and participates in a wedding celebration with the Dong people. The film includes a number of memory flashbacks, as well as many pop songs played on the son's transistor radio (including Michael Learns to Rock's "That's Why You Go Away", which is an anachronism given that the film is set in the early 1980s).

== Reception ==
Postmen was well received both abroad and at home in China where it won both Best Film and Best Actor (for Teng Rujun) at the Golden Rooster Awards in 1999.

=== Awards and nominations ===
- Golden Rooster Awards, 1999
  - Best Actor – Teng Rujun
  - Best Film
- Awards of the Japanese Academy, 2002
  - Best Foreign Film (nominated)
- Mainichi Film Concours, 2002
  - Best Foreign Language Film
- Montréal World Film Festival, 2002
  - People's Choice Award
  - Grand Prix des Amériques (nominated)
