= Ning Ying =

Chinese film director (born 1959)

- Born: 1959 (age 66–67); Beijing
- Education: Beijing Film Academy
- Occupation: Film director
- Awards: Golden Montgolfiere; 1993 For Fun; Grand Prix du Cinema du Reel; 2002 Railroad of Hope

Chinese name
- Traditional Chinese: 寧瀛
- Simplified Chinese: 宁瀛
Transcriptions
Standard Mandarin
- Hanyu Pinyin: Níng Yíng

Ning Ying (born 1959 in Beijing) is a female Chinese film director often considered a member of China's "Sixth Generation" filmmaker coterie, a group that also includes Jia Zhangke, Zhang Yuan and Wang Xiaoshuai. However, this is more a result of a shared subject matter than anything else, as chronologically, Ning is closer to the earlier Fifth Generation. Her sister, the screenwriter Ning Dai, is a frequent collaborator and the wife of fellow director Zhang Yuan. In 1997, she was a member of the jury at the 47th Berlin International Film Festival.

== Directorial career ==
Part of the first class to reenter the Beijing Film Academy in 1978 (along with Fifth Generation helmers Zhang Yimou, Tian Zhuangzhuang and Chen Kaige), Ning Ying's career veered away from the path of her male counterparts when she was allowed to study abroad in Italy's Centro Sperimentale di Cinematografia. While in Italy, she met Italian director Bernardo Bertolucci, whom she would act as an assistant director for in the 1987 epic The Last Emperor.

Her own career first reached international prominence with 1993's For Fun (also known as Looking for Fun), which would become the first of Ning Ying's "Beijing Trilogy," a loosely tied grouping of films that all take place in Beijing — the other two films being the black comedy, On the Beat and the drama, I Love Beijing. Together, the films are an analysis of the massive changes that China's national capital has undergone in the recent decades.

In 2003, the trilogy was shown in its entirety by the Harvard Film Archive in an event touted as "From China with Love: The Films of Ning Ying."

Ning followed her Beijing trilogy with a full-length documentary, Railroad of Hope in 2002, which followed the mass migration of cheap labor throughout China. The film managed to win the Grand Prix du Cinema du Reel in 2002.

In 2005, she made Perpetual Motion, which premiered in several major film festivals, notably Venice and Toronto.

== Filmography ==
Year	English Title	Chinese Title	Notes
1990	Someone Loves Just Me	有人偏偏爱上我	
1992	For Fun	找乐	Golden Montgolfiere at the 1993 Nantes Three Continents Festival
1995	On the Beat	民警故事	
2001	I Love Beijing	夏日暖洋洋	
2002	Railroad of Hope	希望之旅	Grand Prix du Cinema du Reel
2005	Perpetual Motion	无穷动	
2013	Police Diary	警察日记 (Jingcha Riji)	International Premiere at the 2013 Tokyo International Film Festival
2015	Romance Out of the Blue	浪漫天降	
