= Liu Bingjian =

Chinese film director (born 1963)

- Born: October 16, 1963 (age 62); Anhui, China
- Years active: 1990s-2000s
- Awards: FIPRESCI Prize; 1999 Men and Women (Locarno)

Chinese name
- Traditional Chinese: 劉冰鑒
- Simplified Chinese: 刘冰鉴
Transcriptions
Standard Mandarin
- Hanyu Pinyin: Líu Bīngjiàn

Liu Bingjian (born October 16, 1963) is a Chinese film director who emerged on the cinema scene in the late 1990s with his LGBT-themed film Men and Women.

== Career ==
Originally trained as a painter, Liu attended the prestigious Beijing Film Academy where he studied cinematography. Upon graduation, he switched to directing and worked in television before making his first film Inkstone which failed to be screened either in China or abroad.

In 1999, he directed the underground LGBT film Men and Women. Though the film was banned in China, it was seen as a rare example of a Chinese film to treat homosexuality as an everyday occurrence.

Liu followed up Men and Women with Cry Woman in 2002.

Like many of his colleagues, Liu Bingjian emerged from the underground scene with 2004's state-approved Plastic Flowers, starring actress Liu Xiaoqing in her first role in over a decade. The film premiered at the 2004 Toronto International Film Festival.

== Filmography ==
Year	English title	Chinese title	Notes
1995	Inkstone	砚床	
1999	Men and Women	男男女女	
2002	Cry Woman	哭泣的女人	
2004	Plastic Flowers	春花开	
2010	The Back		Bei mian
