= Yu Bo =

Chinese actor (born 1976)

- Born: July 22, 1976 (age 50); Shenyang, Liaoning
- Education: Beijing Film Academy
- Occupation: Actor
- Years active: 2001–present
- Musical career
- Also known as: Apollo

Yu Bo (Chinese: 于波; pinyin: Yú Bō; born July 22, 1976) is a Chinese actor.

== Biography ==
Yu was born on July 22, 1976, in Shenyang, Liaoning. From 1996 to 1999 he worked at the Diaoyutai State Guesthouse in Beijing as a security guard.

He entered the Beijing Film Academy in 1999, and graduated in 2003. While a student there, he was chosen to star in the 2003 television series Treasure Raiders opposite Nicky Wu. The role made him nationally famous. He later appeared in many films and TV series, including the 2013 film Saving General Yang, for which he was nominated for the best action movie actor in the 2015 Shanghai International Film Festival.

== Filmography ==
Year	Chinese title	English title	Role
2002	女人汤	Women's Hotspring	Lin Jusheng
2002	萧十一郎	Treasure Raiders	Lian Chengbi
2003	少年王	Wesley	Bai Qiwei
2003	水晶之恋	Romantic Crystal Love	Yu Bo
2004	灵镜传奇	The Legend of Magic Mirror	Tong Bo
2004	水月洞天	Paradise	Long Teng and Tong Bo
2005	李卫辞官	Li Wei Resigns from Office	Qianlong Emperor
2006	神鬼八阵图	The Diagram of Eight Tactics	Zhuge Liang / Xun Rizhao
2006	傲剑江湖	Ao Jian Jiang Hu	Fang Xu
2006	幻影神针	Magical Needle	Jin Cheng
2007	让爱化作珍珠雨	Let Love Evolve Into Pearl Rain	Yuan Haoyong
2008	迅雷急先锋	Message Thunder Daring Vanguard	Han Cheng
2010	包三姑外传	The Legend of Aunt Bao	Yongle Emperor
2010	一路顺风	Bon Voyage	Huang Meng
2010	大内低手	Da Nei Di Shou	Jia Qing
2011	孔雀翎	Kong Que Ling	Qiu Tianming
2011	海魂	Souls at Sea	Gao Shengzhong
2013	辣妈俏爸	My Lovely Parents	Ai Dingbao
2015	午夜蝴蝶	Midnight Girl	Liu Hengsheng
2015	秦时明月	The Legend of Qin	Liu Bang
2016	解忧公主	Princess Jieyou	Emperor Wu of Han
2016	秀丽江山	Singing All Along	Gengshi Emperor
2016	解密	Decoded	Lu Run
2016	美人如玉剑如虹	Magnificent Sword with Beauty	Wen Zheng
2017	孤芳不自赏	General and I	Sima Hong
2017	寻人大师	The Hunting Genius	Jiu Wang
2017	将军在上	Oh My General	Fan Zhongyan
2018	寻秦记	A Step Into The Past	Zhao Mu
2018	人生若如初相见	Siege in Fog	Li Chongnian
2018	芸汐传	Legend of Yunxi	King of West
2019	倚天屠龙记	Heavenly Sword and Dragon Saber	Yang Dingtien
2019	新龙门客栈	New Dragon Gate Inn	Wang Chao
2019	战地迷情	Zhan Di Mi Qing	He Wenqing
2020	漂亮书生	In a Class of Her Own	Xue Dingkun
2021	号手就位	The Glory of Youth	An Lei

=== Film ===
Year	Chinese title	English title	Role
1999	男男女女	Men and Women	Xiao Bo
2004	雾语	The Narrow Path	Xiao Bo
2004	星星相吸惜	Star Appeal	Xiao Bo
2005	我如花似玉的儿子	My Fair Son	Xiao Bo
2009	我的左手和右手	My Left Hand and Right Hand	Zhang Jianchao
2011	飞天	Above the Sky	Xie Zhaoyang
2011	先驱者	The Forerunner	Liu Tao
2013	百星酒店	Hotel Deluxe	Lei Jin
2013	忠烈杨家将	Saving General Yang	Yang Yanding
2013	诡婴吉咪	Baby Blues	Boss
2014	六福喜事	Hello Babies	Xiubo
2015	新步步惊心	Time to Love	Crown Prince
2016	轩辕大帝	Xuan Yuan the Great Emperor	Emperor
2017	我们遇见松花湖	Love Forever	Song Wencheng
2021	我爱喵星人	Catman	
