= Tao Hong (actress, born 1969) =

- Born: 11 May 1969 (age 57); Wan County, Sichuan, China (now Zhong County, Chongqing)
- Education: Central Academy of Drama
- Occupations: Actress, singer
- Years active: 1991–present

Chinese name
- Traditional Chinese: 陶紅
- Simplified Chinese: 陶红
Transcriptions
Standard Mandarin
- Hanyu Pinyin: Táo Hóng
- Musical career
- Also known as: Helen Tao

Tao Hong (born 11 May 1969), also known as Helen Tao, is a Chinese actress and singer. She received the 2002 Golden Rooster Award for Best Actress.

== Filmography ==
=== Film ===
Year	Title	Role	Notes
1991	In Pursuit of the Sun (追赶太阳的人)		
1991	Bleeding in Heaven (天出血)		
1992	Passenger of the Raft (筏子客)	Xinghua	
1992	The Female Assassin (女杀手)	Ding Rongrong	
1999	Crash Landing (紧急迫降)	air hostess	
2000	Gift Exchange (礼尚往来)		
2001	I Love Beijing (夏日暖洋洋)	Miao Miao	
2002	Life Show (生活秀)	Lai Shuangyang	
2003	38°C (三十八度)	Xiaoyue	
2004	Beyond Our Ken (公主復仇記)	Shirley Chow	
2006	Taekwondo (跆拳道)	Liu Li	
2009	One in 2008 (2008分之一)		Segment 5: "One in 2008"
2010	Death Dowry (米香)	Mi Xiang	also art supervisor
2015	The Prescription for Life (天使：生命处方)	Chen Jumei	
2015	For This Land (为了这片土地)		

=== TV Dramas ===
Year	Title	Role	Notes
1998	Female Prisoner (女囚)	Ye Ping	
1999	Eight Eccentrics of Yangzhou (揚州八怪)	Consort Ling	
2001	Riding the Neighing Horse in the West Wind (策馬嘯西風)	Ming Yuexin	
2001	Master Swordsman Lu Xiaofeng (陸小鳳之決戰前後)	Ouyang Qing	
2001	Black Hole (黑洞)	Meng Lin	
2002	Wind and Cloud (風雲)	Yu Chuchu	
2002	Lifestyle Change (换个活法)	Gu Lan	
2002	The True Love of Rose (真情玫瑰)	Zhang Fang	
2003	The Love Song of Kangding (康定情歌)	Muya Kangzhu	
2004	Wonderful Girl (奇妙女孩)	Qin Qiran	
2004	Parasol Rain (梧桐相思雨)	Princess Baoling	
2004	Sleeping with the Enemy (与敌共眠)	Zhang Jingxue	
2005	Legend of Prince Suo Er Ye (褡褳王爺)	Ziyan / Zhu Li	
2005	Jasmine (茉莉花)	Qingyu	
2006	Romantic Lover (浪漫爱人)	Luo Dan	
2006	Mama's Soup House (妈妈的酱汤馆)	Jin Baihe	
2007	The Innocent Years (纯真岁月)	Tao Xuanyu	
2007	Stupid Kid (笨小孩)	Wang Xingyue	
2008	The Province Governor and His Daughters (乔省长和他的女儿们)	Qiao Yuan	
2008	Wonder Woman (女人本色)	Cheng Zaixin	
2010	Father's Love (父爱如山)	Ma Li	
2011	Silly Chun (傻春)	Zhao Suchun	
2011	Mine People (矿山人家)	Liu Yunting	
2011	The Kangs of Heluo (河洛康家)	Zhou Ruolan	
2012	Nine Rivers into the Sea (九河入海)	Lady Tang	
2012	Knife Out of the Sheath (刀出鞘)	Zhou Yuqin	
2014	Silly Wife's Urban Diaries (憨妻的都市日记)	Jin Duobao	
2014	Come Home Baby Child (宝贝儿回家)	Kang Xiaoman	
2015	Our Family's Happy Life (我们家的微幸福生活)	Zou Min	
