= Huo Jianqi =

Chinese film director (born 1958)

- Born: January 20, 1958 (age 68)
- Occupation: Film director
- Spouse: Qiu Shi
- Awards: Huabiao Award for Outstanding Director; 2000 A Love of Blueness; 2003 Nuan; Shanghai Golden Goblet; 2002 Life Show; Tokyo Grand Prix; 2003 NuanGolden Rooster Awards – Best Film; 1999 Postmen in the Mountains; 2003 Nuan

Huo Jianqi (Chinese: 霍建起; born January 20, 1958) is a Chinese film director. Like the cinematographer turned director Gu Changwei, Huo Jianqi began his cinematic career in the art department. Nearly all of Huo's films have been written by his wife and collaborator, Qiu Shi, who works under the name "Si Wu." Unlike many of his contemporaries (and predecessors), Huo rarely has had issues with the Chinese government regarding his films, leading some western critics to label him the "darling director of China's film bureaucracy."

== Career ==
Huo attended the Beijing Film Academy in the early 1980s as part of the "Fifth Generation" (which also included directors like Zhang Yimou and Chen Kaige). After graduation, he worked as an art director, including on films such as Tian Zhuangzhuang's The Horse Thief (1986). Huo's own career as a director did not begin, however, until 1995 with The Winner and would not achieve true international success until his 1999 film, Postmen in the Mountains. The simple tale of a father and son traveling through the mountains of Hunan delivering mail proved a success in both China, where it eventually won the Golden Rooster for best film, best director, and best actor Teng Rujun, and abroad in foreign festivals. Upon its release in the United States, the film was praised by critics for its sincerity, critic Roger Ebert noted that the film was "so simple and straightforward that its buried emotions catch us a little by surprise." Huo repeated that film's success with his subsequent project, including 2000's A Love of Blueness and 2002's Life Show (which won the Golden Goblet for best film at the Shanghai International Film Festival).

Huo scored another success with his adaptation of author Mo Yan's The White Dog and the Swing, entitled Nuan. The film, starring Guo Xiaodong and Li Jia in the title role, won the Grand Prix at the Tokyo International Film Festival, as well as another best picture Golden Rooster.

== Filmography ==
Year	English Title	Chinese Title	Notes
1995	The Winner	赢家	
1997	The Singer	歌手	
1999	Postmen in the Mountains	那山那人那狗	Golden Rooster for Best Picture
2000	A Love of Blueness	蓝色爱情	
2002	Life Show	生活秀	Golden Goblet at the Shanghai International Film Festival
2003	Nuan	暖	Golden Rooster for Best Picture
2005	A Time to Love	情人结	
2008	Li Shuangliang	时代愚公	
2009	Snowfall in Taipei	台北飘雪	
2011	The Seal of Love	秋之白华	
2013	Falling Flowers	萧红	
2015	Love in the 1980s	1980年代的爱情	
2016	Xuanzang	大唐玄奘	
