= The House (1999 film) =

- Film poster
- Traditional Chinese: 夢幻田園
- Simplified Chinese: 梦幻田园
- Hanyu Pinyin: Mèng hùan tián yúan
- Directed by: Wang Xiaoshuai
- Written by: Guo Xiaolu; Wang Bin
- Produced by: Tong Gang; Yan Xiaoming; Han Sanping
- Starring: Fu Lili; Tao Zi; Faye Yu; Zhao Tieren
- Edited by: Yang Hongyu
- Music by: Wang Xiaofeng
- Production companies: Beijing Film Studio; China Film Group
- Release date: February 1999 (China)
- Running time: 90 minutes
- Country: China
- Language: Mandarin

The House is a 1999 Chinese film directed by Wang Xiaoshuai. It is rarely, if ever, screened abroad, and remains one of Wang Xiaoshuai's least well-known works outside of China. It is alternatively referred to as Suburban Dreams, Fantasy Garden or Dream House. The film was produced by the Beijing Film Studio and the China Film Group. Wang Xiaoshuai himself considers it one of his most inconsequential efforts to date, to the extent that it has "sunk into oblivion."

== Plot ==
In contrast to Wang's previous films, The House is a family-comedy that follows a young urban married couple as well as their friends, ex-girlfriends, and family. A young couple has recently purchased their dream house and are expecting a baby. One day, while his wife is out of the home, an ex-girlfriend arrives at the door drenched from rain. She had heard of his wife's pregnancy and had come only to sell the couple insurance. The husband, feeling sympathetic allows her to take a shower in his home.

Suddenly, his in-laws arrive at the home unexpectedly. The husband now has to find a way to get his ex-girlfriend out of the home without his in-laws noticing, and all before his wife returns home.

== Cast ==
- Fu Lili — Mrs. Lin
- Tao Zi — Xiao Xia
- You Yong — Wen Gang
- Faye Yu — Lei An-an
- Zhao Tieren

== Production ==
The House was, in essence, Wang Xiaoshuai's apology to the Beijing Film Studio. After financing his previous film, So Close to Paradise, the studio was forced to wait for censors to approve the film for nearly four years, whereupon it was not even given a commercial release. Embarrassed that his friends at the studio had supported him for naught, Wang offered to direct a light comedy for the studio in an effort to recoup losses from the previous film.

Despite the film's low-budget and simple story, shooting The House proved to be unusually difficult. For one thing, the film was plagued with equipment failure. None of the film cameras' lenses had been modulated correctly, resulting in the cameras being unable to focus through windows for external shots. As a result of these problems, the shoot lasted twenty days, longer than had been anticipated. More significantly, the shooting schedule fell on the hottest part of the year in Beijing. With temperatures exceeding 40 degrees Celsius outside, and 45 degrees indoors, the shoot took a toll on both cast and crew.

== Release ==
Because of the film's non-controversial story, The House was easily approved by Chinese censors, in sharp contrast to Wang's earlier films from 1993's The Days to 1997's Frozen, to 1998's So Close to Paradise. Nevertheless, The House received only a limited screening with no promotion, for one week in Beijing. Wang claimed that this was due to problems with other films, which affected a slew of Beijing Film Studio productions, including The House.
