= Red Amnesia =

2014 film

- Film poster
- Traditional Chinese: 闖入者
- Simplified Chinese: 闯入者
- Literal meaning: intruder
- Hanyu Pinyin: chuǎngrù zhě
- Directed by: Wang Xiaoshuai
- Written by: Wang Xiaoshuai; Fang Lei; Li Fei
- Produced by: Liu Xuan
- Starring: Lü Zhong; Shi Liu; Feng Yuanzheng; Qin Hao; Qin Hailu; Han Yibo
- Cinematography: Wu Di
- Edited by: Yang Hongyu
- Music by: Umeit
- Production companies: Chongqing Film Group; 21st Century Media presentation of a WXS production in association with Chinese Shadows
- Distributed by: A Dongchun Films; Inlook Media Group; Herun Media, Edko (Beijing) Films; Gravity Pictures Film
- Release dates: September 4, 2014 (Venice); April 30, 2015 (China)
- Running time: 110 minutes
- Country: China
- Language: Mandarin

Red Amnesia (Chinese: 闯入者) is a 2014 Chinese thriller film directed by Wang Xiaoshuai. The film deals with the psychological impact of an elderly retired widow (played by Lü Zhong)'s past. Wang considers Red Amnesia to be the last film of his Cultural Revolution trilogy, which includes 2005's Shanghai Dreams and 2011's 11 Flowers. The film was released on April 30, 2015.

== Synopsis ==
Red Amnesia follows a family living in modern Beijing. Deng Meijuan, a widowed lady, lives on her own in a small rundown flat. Her relationships with her sons are strained - Elder son, Jun, is married and lives in a comfortable and modern apartment with his family, while younger son, Bing, has a boyfriend who Deng pretends she does not know about. Deng visits her sons and elderly mother at a nursing home regularly.

Soon, Deng's comfortable life pattern is disrupted by strange occurrences, consequences of a decision she had made during the Cultural Revolution, that no doubt had impacted the lives of others in the present.

== Cast ==
- Lü Zhong as Deng Meijuan
- Feng Yuanzheng as Deng Jun, son of Meijuan
- Qin Hailu as Deng Lu, wife of Deng Jun
- Qin Hao as Deng Bing, younger brother of Jun
- Shi Liu
- Han Yibo as boyfriend of Bing

== Reception ==
The film was selected in competition for the Golden Lion at the 71st Venice International Film Festival. It also appeared as a Special Presentations at the 2014 Toronto International Film Festival.

Actress Lü Zhong won the award for Best Performance by an Actress at the 8th Asia Pacific Screen Awards for her performance in the film.

As of May 11, the film had earned $1.42 million at the Chinese box office.
