= Peggy Chiao =

Taiwanese film producer (born 1953)

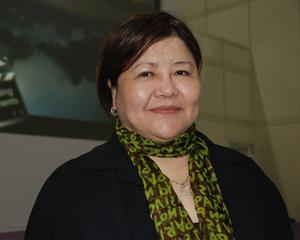
- Born: Taiwan
- Education: University of California, Los Angeles; University of Texas at Austin
- Occupations: Film producer, Professor
- Years active: 1992–present
- Notable work: The Hole (1998 film); Beijing Bicycle; Betelnut Beauty; Blue Gate Crossing; Hear Me

Peggy Chiao is a Taiwanese-Chinese filmmaker, producer, distributor, educator, juror, critic, and author. She is known internationally as the "godmother of New Taiwan Cinema".

In 1997, Chiao established Arc Light Films, a production company with pan-Chinese ambition which has produced films with directors like Ann Hui, Stanley Kwan, Wang Xiaoshuai, Olivier Assayas, Yi Chih-yen, Kenny Bi and many more collaborators.

Since then, Chiao has produced critically and commercially successful films encompassing many genres and themes. Her award-winning films include Beijing Bicycle (2001), The Hole (1998), Blue Gate Crossing (2002), Drifters (2003), Green Hat (2004), Betelnut Beauty (2001), HHH: Portrait of Hous-Hsiao-Hsien (2012), Lost in Beijing (2007), Buddha Mountain (2010) and The Drummer (2007), among many others. She also helped initiate the romantic comedy genre in Taiwan and China with films such as Hear Me (2009), Blue Gate Crossing (2002), Love Speaks (2013), and The Stolen Years (2013). She produced period dramas such as Empire of Silver (2009) and Lord of Shanghai (2016), and also documentaries such as Homesick Eyes (1997) and Datong: The Great Society (2011).

She has also explored web platforms with series like Finding Soul (2016), with the Chinese idol group TFBoys.

Chiao was a tireless advocate of the new talents in Taiwan, Hong Kong, and mainland China. She is one of the main reasons Hou Hsiao-Hsien, Edward Yang, Ang Lee, Wang Xiaoshuai, Tsai Ming Liang, and many other directors have been introduced to the western world. During the 1980s and 1990s, Chiao has been credited for introducing the world to New Taiwan Cinema, helping define the diverse aesthetics as well as cultural and historical themes in the movement.

In 2007, she was elected as chair of the Golden Horse Film Festival, for which she reformed the jury system, brought in FIPRESCI and NETPAC and established co-production meetings; helping shape Golden Horse into the world-renowned film festival as it is today. Earlier in 1990, Chiao founded the China Times Express Award, which evolved into the Taipei International Film Award.

She has served as juror for many international film festivals including San Francisco, Seattle, Vancouver, Berlin, Brisbane, Sydney, Rome, Venice, San Sebastián, São Paulo, Buenos Aires, Mannheim-Heidelberg, Oberhausen, Tokyo, Fukuoka, Jeonju, Singapore, Hong Kong, Bangkok, New Delhi, Tashkent and many Chinese film festivals.

Academically, Chiao was the director of the Graduate School of Filmmaking at the Taipei National University of the Arts and has been a professor there since 1985. She has taught in different universities in Taipei, Shanghai, Nanchang, and Beijing.

Chiao has published over 80 books throughout her career, some of which have been assigned as textbooks in film schools in Chinese-language territories.

== Career ==
Chiao received her MA at the University of Texas at Austin and was in the Ph.D. program at the University of California, Los Angeles.

As a film critic and author, Chiao has written for major Taiwanese newspapers. She keeps regular columns in China for film magazines and newspapers. Many of her essays have been translated and included in various anthologies. Some of her notable books include New Taiwan Cinema (1987), Hong Kong New Wave (1987) and Aspects of New Asian Films (1991), The auteurs of Taiwan and Hong Kong Films (1995), French New Wave (2004), Musicals (1993), Films of Akira Kurosawa (2018), Latino Cinema (part I&II, 2021), etc.

Chiao was the CEO of National Taiwan Film Year consigned by the Taiwan government in 1993, for which she programmed 16 retrospectives of Taiwan films abroad and various projects to consolidate film industry and culture. This includes producing 6 shorts with youngsters who later became famous directors such as Chen Yu-hsun, Hsiao Ya-chuan, and Lin Cheng-sheng. The following year, Chiao founded the Taiwan Film Center to help develop an international network for local Taiwanese filmmakers, organizing Taiwan Retrospectives at Pesaro, Toronto, New York's Lincoln Center, Chicago's Art Center, etc.

== Filmography ==
Year	Title	Category	Director	Position	Accolades
2021	Farewell, My Lad	Feature Films	Yin Ruoxi	Producer	Shanghai International Film Festival China Movie Channel Media Award Best Actress / Best New Actor; – Nomination of Best Film, Best Screenplay, Best New Director
2019	Qing’s Journey	Documentary	Gao Tunzi	Producer	Universe Multicultural Film Festival Culture Heritage Film Award; – Beijing Ethnographic Film Festival – Asia Pacific Screen Awards Nomination of Best of Documentary
2018	A Dog’s Life	Animation Feature	Chang Yi	Associate Producer	Golden Horse Awards Nomination of Animation Long Feature; – Osaka Asian Film FestivalNomination of Best Animation film – Animafest Zagreb Nomination of Best film
2018	A Land Imagined	Feature Films	Yeo Siew- hua	APSA Mentor	Locarno Film Festival Golden Leopard; – Asia Pacific Screen AwardsYoung Cinema Award – Golden Horse Awards Best Original Screenplay, Best Original Music
2016	Finding Soul	Web Series	Fenfen Cheng	Producer	Asia New Media Film Festival, Seoul Best Web Series
2016	Mr. Zhu's Summer	Feature Films	Song Hao-lin	Producer	Golden Rooster Awards Nomination of Best Children's Film / Best Directorial Debut
2015	Lord of Shanghai	Feature Films	Sherwood Hu	Producer	Shanghai International Film Festival Closing Film
2014 - 2015	In Focus	Talk Show		Producer/Host	Guest: John Woo, Yimou Zhang, Wen Jiang, Xiaogang Feng, Peter Chan, Sylvia Chang, Hao Ning, Tianming Wu, Jean-Jacques Annaud, Xu Zheng, Yinan Diao, Han Han, Yang Lu, Alex Law, Mabel Cheung, Baoping Cao, Stan Lai, Changwei Gu, Jian Cui, Ziyi Zhang, Bingbing Li, Amber Kuo, Lei Huang, Danqing Chen, Shaohong Li, Li Fang...
2013	The Stolen Years	Feature Films	Wong Chun-chun	Associate Producer	
2013	Love Speaks	Feature Films	Li Zhi	Producer	
2012	Datong: The Great Society	Documentary	Evans Chan	Producer	Nanfang Metropolis Daily Best Film Award; – New Taipei Film FestivalClosing Film
2012	Two Or Three Things About Kang Youwei	Documentary	Chen Yao-ming	Producer	Nanfang Metropolis Daily Best Film Award; – New Taipei Film FestivalClosing Film
2011	Thief	Short Films	Jay Cheng	Producer	Golden Horse Awards Best Short Feature Film; Golden Harvest Awards Best Director / Excellent Performance; Golden Bell Awards Best Miniseries or Television Film／Best Directing for a TV movie - Short Shorts Film Festival & Asia "International Competition" Best Short Feature Film / Best Actress
2011	Tempest of First Love	Feature Films	Chiang Fong-hon	Producer	New Taipei City Film Festival Opening Film
2010	Cherish	Documentary	Wang Cheng-yang	Producer	Short Shorts Film Festival & Asia "STOP! Global Warming Competition" Best Award / Audiences-selected award
2010	Love You Ten Thousand Year	Feature Films	Kitamura Toyoharu	Producer	Osaka Asian Film Festival Most Popular Film Popularity Award
2010	Me，19	Feature Films	Cheng Nai-fang	Producer	Kuandu Art Festival Opening Film
2010	Buddha Mountain	Feature Films	Li yu	Associate Producer	Tokyo International Film Festival Best Actress / Best Art Contribution; Nominated：Golden Horse Awards Best Leading Actress
2010	Like a Dream	Feature Films	Clara Law	Producer	Nominated：Golden Horse Awards Best Feature Film / Best Director / Best Leading Actor / Best Leading Actress / Best Original Film Score / Best Original Screenplay / Best Cinematography / Best Sound Effects / Best Art Direction
2009	Birthday	Short Films	Wang Cheng-yang	Producer	Golden Harvest Award First Award
2009	Hear Me	Feature Films	Cheng Fen-fen	Producer	Taipei Film Festival Best Actress; Osaka Asian Film Festival Most Popular Film Popularity Award - 2009 Box-office Champion in Taiwan; Nominated：Golden Horse Awards FIPRESCI Prize
2009	Empire of Silver	Feature Films	Christina Yao	Producer	Berlin International Film Festival "Panorama"; Shanghai International Film Festival Jury Prize - Hawaii International Film Festival Best Narrative Feature - 2009 CCTV TV Media Awards Most Focused-in Director
2008	Hopscotch	Short Films	Chiang Hsiu-chiung	Producer	Golden Horse Award Best Short Feature Film; Asia Pacific Film Festival Best Short Feature Film
2007	The Drummer	Feature Films	Kenneth Bi	Producer	Golden Horse Award Best Supporting Actor; Nominated – Hong Kong Film Award Best Sound Design / Best Original Film Song
2007	Lost in Beijing	Feature Films	Li yu	Associate Producer	Nominated : Berlin International Film Festival Golden Bear Award; Tribeca Film Festival Screenplay Honor - The Eurasia International Film Festival Best Actress - World Film Festival of Bangkok Jury Prize
2005	How's Life?	Short Films	Tommy Yu	Producer	Lumière Film Festival Best Film Second Runner-up; Golden Horse Awards Best New Actor / Best Short Film; Golden Harvest Awards Best DV Drama Awards; The International Student Film and Video Festival of Beijing Film Academy; Best Chinese Film
2005	Karmic Mahjong	Feature Films	Wang Guan-li	Producer	
2005	Stolen Life	Feature Films	Li Shao-hong	Associate Producer	Kerala International Film Festival Best Film; Tribeca Film Festival Best Film
2004	Love of May	Feature Films	Tsui Siu-ming	Producer	
2004	Green Hat	Feature Films	Liu Fen-dou	Associate Producer	Tribeca Film Festival Best Director / Best Film; Thessaloniki International Film Festival FIPRESCI Prize; Noir in Festival Special Mention - São Paulo International Film Festival New Directors Competition
2003	Darkness Bride	Feature Films	Kwok Wai-lun	Producer	
2003	Drifters	Feature Films	Wang Xiao-shuai	Producer	Cannes Film Festival "Un certain regard"; Cinemaya Film Festival Best Actor & NETPAC Award; Film Festival of the 3 Continents Opening Film
2002	Blue Gate Crossing	Feature Films	Yee Chin-yen	Producer	Nominated – Hong Kong Film Awards for Best Asian Film
2001	Betelnut Beauty	Feature Films	Lin Cheng-sheng	Producer	Berlin International Film Festival Best Director, New Talent Award
2001	Beijing Bicycle	Feature Films	Wang Xiao-shuai	Producer	Berlin International Film Festival Jury Grand Prix, New Talent Award; Nominated – Golden Horse Awards Best Feature Film / Best Director / Best New Performer / Best Original Screenplay / Best Cinematography / Best Film Editing
2000	Mirror Image	Feature Films	Hsiao Ya-chuan	Associate Producer	Taipei Film Festival Best Film / Best New Director; Fukuoka International Film Festival Audience Award - Vancouver International Film Festival Young Director Award - Cannes Film Festival Directors' Fortnight
1998	The Hole	Feature Films	Tsai Ming-liang	Producer	Cannes Film Festival Competition FIPRESCI Prize; Chicago International Film Festival Gold Hugo Awards - Taipei Film Festival Jury Prize - Singapore International Film Festival Best Film, Best Actor / Best Actress
1997	HHH:Portrait of Hou Hsiao- hsien	Documentary	Olivier Assayas	Producer	Venice Film Festival; – Berlin International Film Festival
1997	Still Love You After All These	Documentary	Stanley Kwan	Producer	Venice Film Festival; – Berlin International Film Festival
1997	As Time Goes By	Documentary	Ann Hui	Producer	Venice Film Festival; – Berlin International Film Festival
1997	Homesick Eyes	Documentary	Hsu Hsiao- ming	Producer	Berlin International Film Festival Youth Forum Ecumcuical Awards; – Yamagata International Documentary Film Festival FIPRESCI Prize – Golden Horse Award Best Documentary – Hawaii International Film Festival Best Documentary
1991	Center Stage	Feature Films	Stanley Kwan	Writer	Berlin International Film Festival Best Actress; Golden Horse Awards Best Leading Actress / Best Cinematography - Hong Kong Film Awards for Best Actress, Best Cinematography / Best Art Direction/ Best Original Film Song - Chicago International Film Festival Silver Hugo Award for Best Actress - Japan Movie Critics Award Best Foreign Actress

== Bibliography ==
Notable Works
English Title	Year Published	Pinyin Title	Original Title & Publisher	English Translation
Surprise and Delight of Latino Cinema:Four New Wave	2021		拉丁電影文化驚艷:四大新浪潮 (蓋亞文化)	No
Cultural Origins of Latino Cinema: From Bunuel to Almodovar	2021		拉丁電影文化溯源:從布紐爾到阿莫多瓦 (蓋亞文化)	No
The French New Wave	2020		法國電影新浪潮《電影筆記》70周年紀念增修版 (蓋亞文化)	No
Films of Akira Kurosawa	2019		黑澤明：電影天皇 (蓋亞文化)	No
The French New Wave	2019		法國電影新浪潮修訂版 (北京商務印書館)	No
Sculpting Time：Art Films and National Cinema	2019		雕刻歲月:藝術電影與民族經典 (北京商務印書館)	No
Photographing Time: Essays on East and West Cinema	2019		歲月留影:中西電影論述 (北京商務印書館)	No
Film China	2018		映像中國 (蓋亞文化)	No
Fiilm Taiwan	2018		映像台灣 (蓋亞文化)	No
Peggy Chiao's World of Cinema	2013	Jiao xiongping de dianying tiandi	焦雄屏的電影天地 (龍門書局)	No
The Film Industry's Most Important Changes in the 21st Century World: the consequences of the changes in the industry	2010	Er shi yi shiji shijie zhongyao dianying chanye bankuai yidong – gongye xingshi de bianhua yu jieguo	二十一世紀世界重要電影產業板塊移動—工業形勢的變化與成果 (躍昇出版社)	No
French New Wave	2007	Faguo dianying xin langchao	法國電影新浪潮 (麥田出版社)	No
Taiwan Cinema: The New New Wave of the 90s	2003	Taiwan dianying jiuling xin xin langchao	台灣電影九0新新浪潮 (麥田出版社)	No
A Study of Modern mainland Chinese Cinema	1998	Fengyun jihui: dalu dangdai dianying yanjiu	風雲際會：大陸當代電影研究 (遠流出版社)	No
An Era of Development – a discourse of Chinese and western cinema	1998	Shidai xianying – zhongxi dianying lunshu	時代顯影－中西電影論述 (遠流出版社)	No
A Legend of Hong Kong Cinema: Xiao Fang Fang and 40 years of cinematic tribulations	1995	Xianggang dianying chuanqi: xiao fangfang he si shi nian dianying fengyun	香港電影傳奇：蕭芳芳和四十年電影風雲 (萬象出版社)	No
Lights and Shadows: A Portrait of Xiao Fang Fang	1995	Guangying hongyan – xiao fang fang xiezhen	光影紅顏-蕭芳芳寫真 (萬象出版社)	No
The Five Years that Changed History – A study on international cinema	1994	Gaibian lishi de wu nian – guoji dianying yanjiu	改變歷史的五年－國聯電影研究 (萬象出版社)	No
Musical Film Genre: A Discussion	1994	Gewu dianying zhonghe tan	歌舞電影縱橫談 (遠流出版社)	No
Discussing Cinema	1991	Tan yinglu	影錄 (遠流出版社)	No
Auteurs and genres of Taiwanese Cinema	1991	Taiwan dianying zhong de zuozhe yu leixing	台灣電影中的作者與類型 (遠流出版社)	No
Analyzing Mainstream Films	1990	Yuedu zhuliu dianying	閱讀主流電影 (遠流出版社)	No
Art films and folk classics	1989	Yishu dianying yu minzu jingdian	藝術電影與民族經典 (遠流出版社)	No
Peggy Chiao watches films: Hollywood Films	1985	Jiao xiongping kan dianying: hao lai wu xilie	焦雄屏看電影：好萊塢系列 (三三書坊)	No
Peggy Chiao watches films: Taiwan-Hong Kong Films	1985	Jiao xiongping kan dianying: tai gang xilie	焦雄屏看電影：台港系列 (三三書坊)	No

== Translated works ==
Chinese Title and Publisher	Year Published	Pinyin Title	Original Title & Author
認識電影第十四版 (浙江文藝出版社)	2021		Understanding Movies 14th edition (Louis Giannetti)
對白:文字、舞台、銀幕的言語行為藝術 (天津人民出版社)	2017		Dialogue: The Art of Verbal Action for Page, Stage, and Screen (Robert Mckee)
閃回世界電影史 (蓋亞文化)	2015		Flashback (Louis Giannetti)
閃回電影簡史插圖第六版 (世界圖書出版公司北京公司)	2012	Shanhui dianying jianshi chatu di liu ban	FLASHBACK: A brief history of film, 6e (Louis Giannetti & Scott Eyman)
認識電影第十版 (遠流出版)	2006	Renshi dianying di shi ban	Understanding movies 10e (Louis Giannetti)
導演視野︰遇見250位世界著名的電影導演 (江蘇人民出版社)	2006	Daoyan shiye: yujian 250 wei shijie zhuming de dianying daoyan	The Director's Vision: A Concise Guide to the Art of 250 Great Filmmakers (Geoff Andrews)
再見，吾愛 (臉譜出版)	1998	Zaijian, wu ai	Farewell, My Lovely (Raymond Thorton Chandler)
