= Third Front (China) =

Chinese industrial development campaign

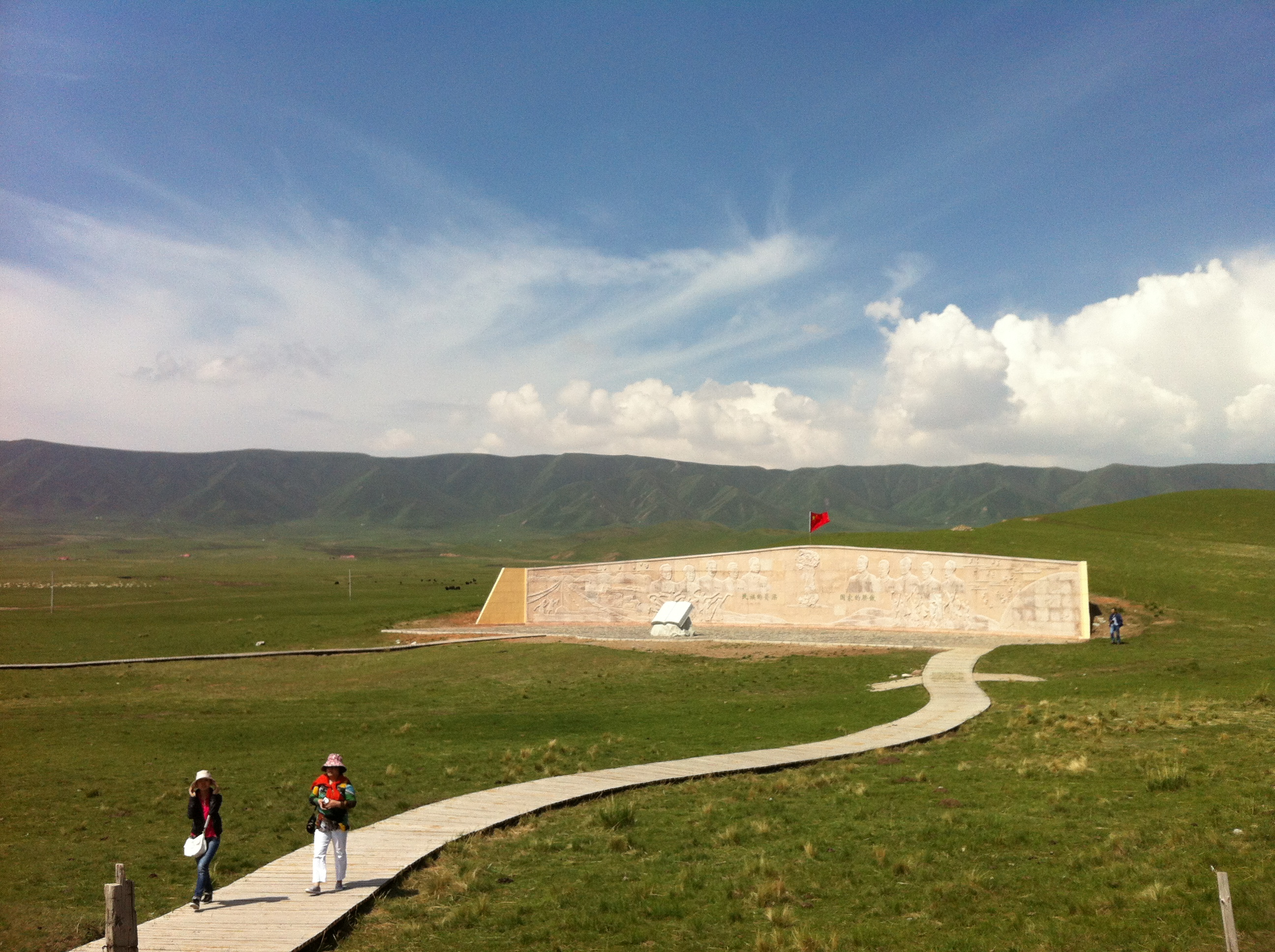
China Nuclear City in Haiyan County, Qinghai, that carries China's nuclear weapons program

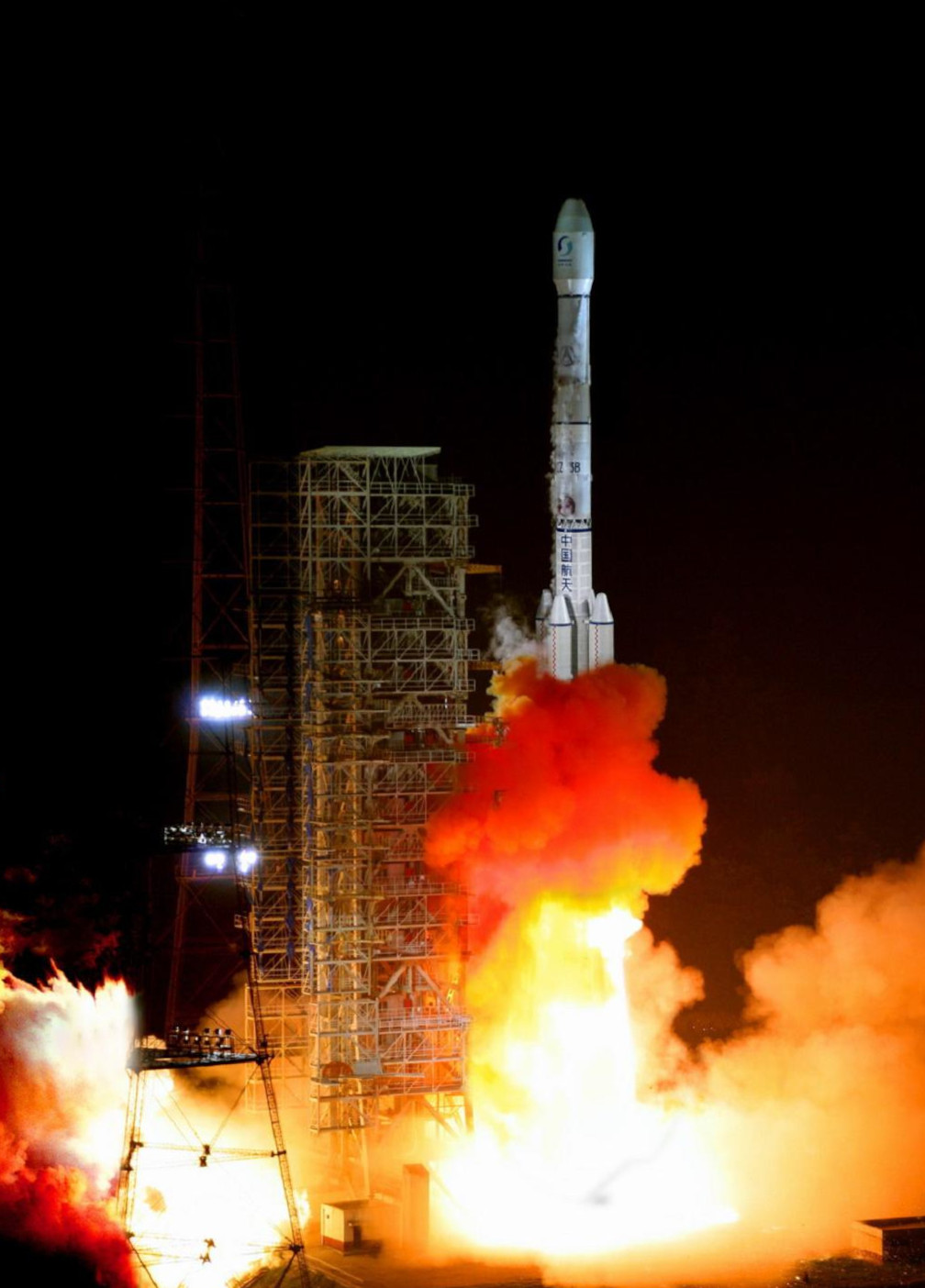
Xichang Satellite Launch Center in Sichuan

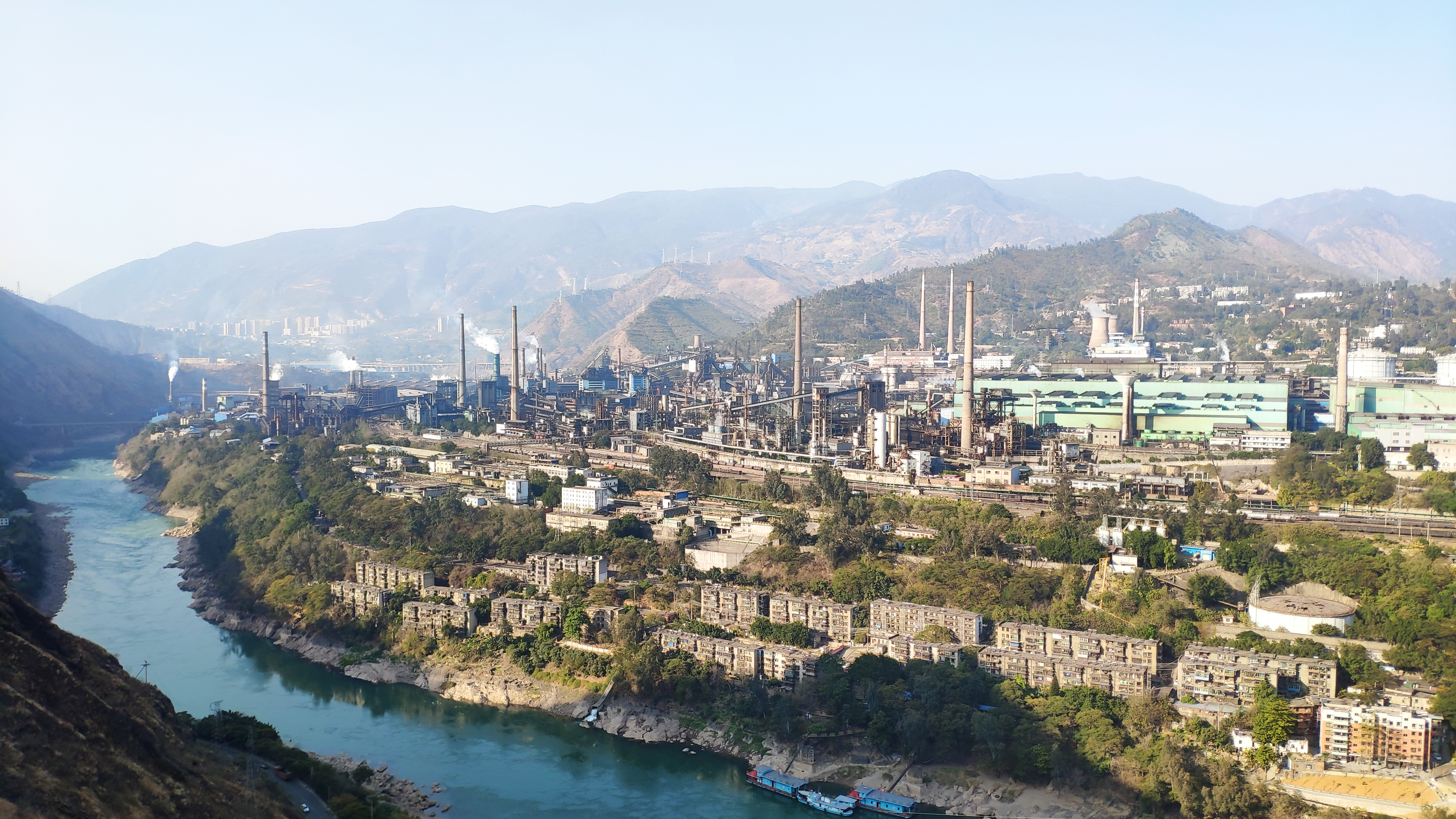
Panzhihua Iron and Steel factory built on mountains

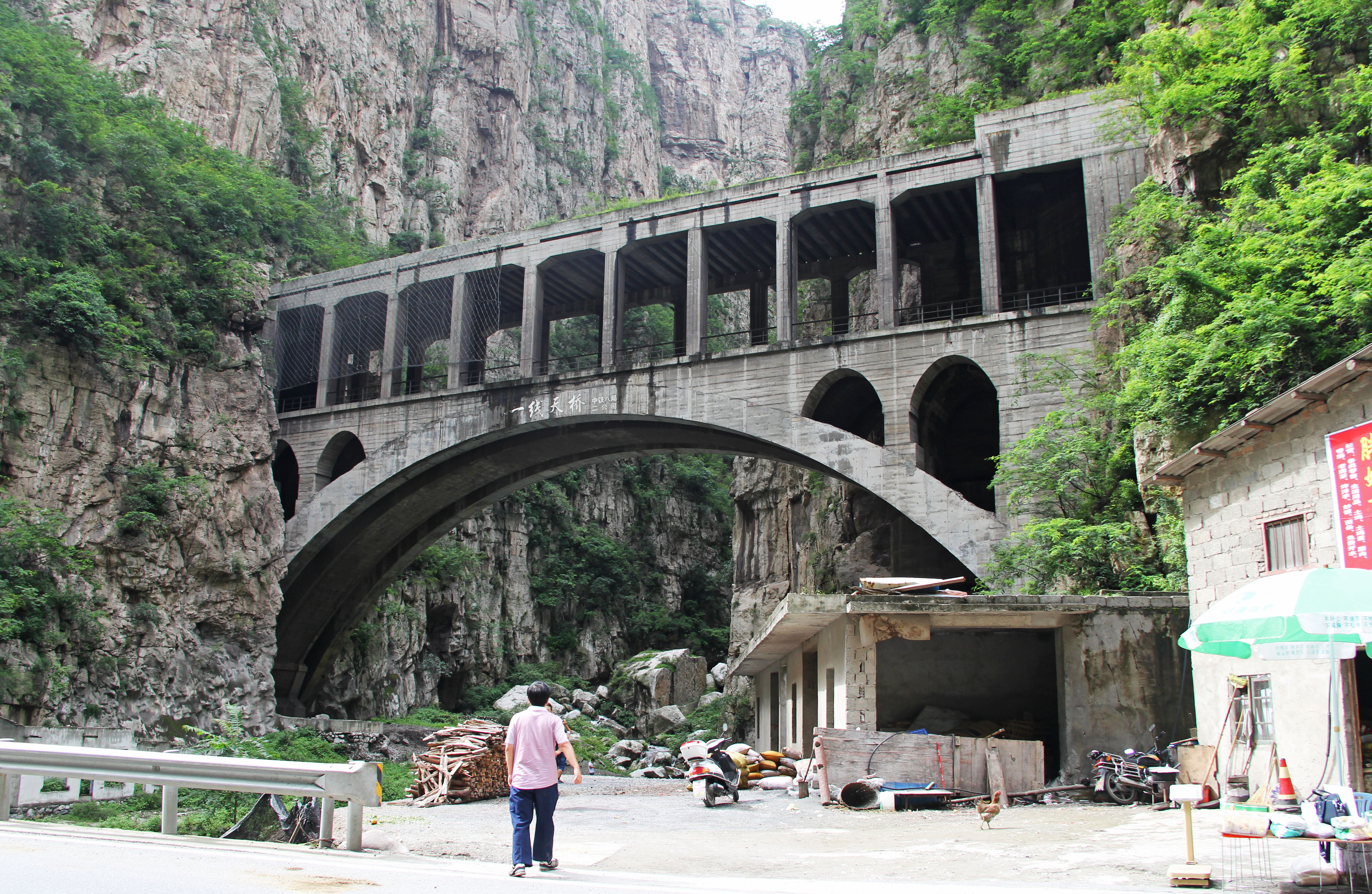
Chengdu-Kunming Railway that links Chengdu and Kunming, but also important facilities like Xichang Satellite Launch Center and Pangang

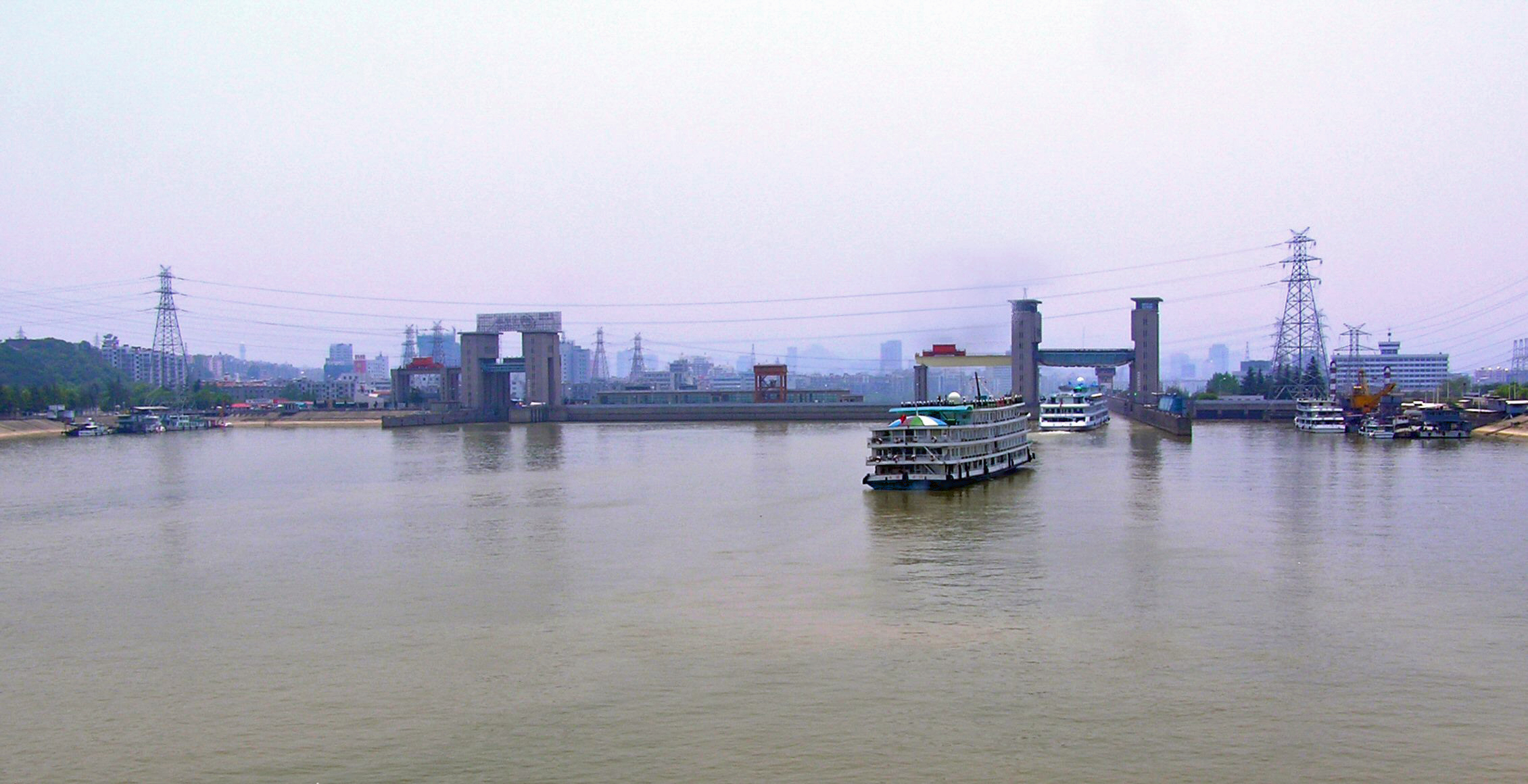
Gezhouba Dam in Yichang, Hubei

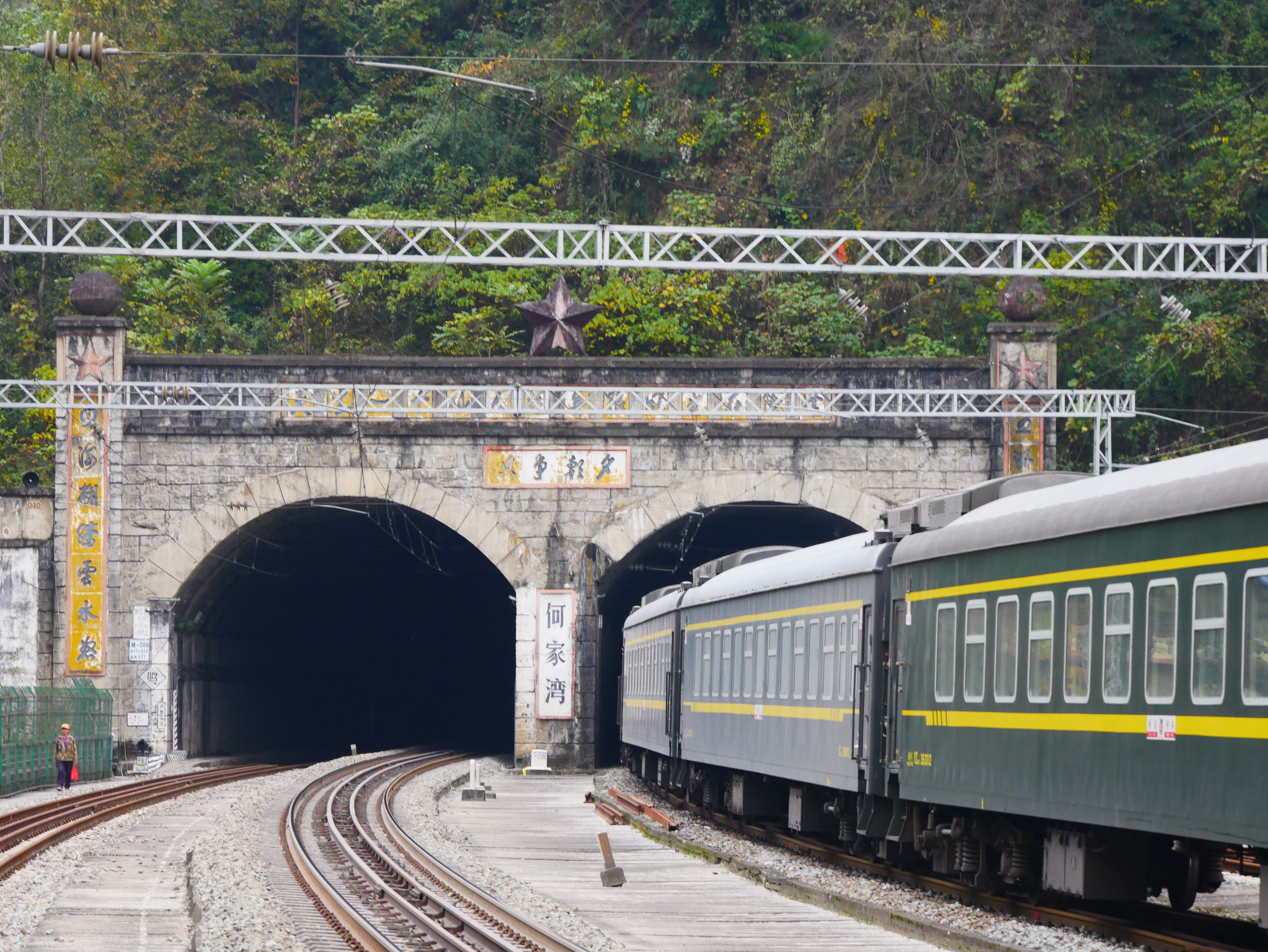
A tunnel portal on Xiangyang–Chongqing railway

The Third Front Movement (Chinese: 三线建设; pinyin: Sānxiàn jiànshè) or Third Front Construction was a Chinese government campaign to develop industrial and military facilities in the country's interior. The campaign was motivated by strategic depth concerns that China's existing industrial and military infrastructure would be vulnerable in the event of invasion by the Soviet Union or air raids by the United States. The largest development campaign of Mao-era China, it involved massive investment in national defense, technology, basic industries (including manufacturing, mining, metal, and electricity), transportation and other infrastructure investments and was carried out primarily in secret.

The Third Front is a geo-military strategy, ensuring the country greater defense in depth: it is relative to the "First Front" area that is close to the potential war fronts. The Third Front region covered 13 provinces and autonomous regions with its core area in the Northwest (including Shaanxi, Gansu, Ningxia, and Qinghai) and Southwest (including today's Sichuan, Chongqing, Yunnan, and Guizhou). Its development was motivated by national defense considerations following the escalation of the Vietnam War after the Gulf of Tonkin Incident, the Sino-Soviet Split and small-scale border skirmishes between China and the Soviet Union.

The Third Front campaign industrialized part of China's rugged interior and agricultural region. Between 1964 and 1980, China invested 205 billion yuan in the Third Front Region, accounting for 39.01% of total national investment in basic industries and infrastructure. Millions of factory workers, cadres, intellectuals, military personnel, and tens of millions of construction workers, flocked to the Third Front region. More than 1,100 large and medium-sized projects were established during the Third Front period. With large projects such as Chengdu-Kunming Railway, Panzhihua Iron and Steel, Second Auto Works, the Third Front Movement stimulated previously poor and agricultural economies in China's southwest and northwest. Dozens of cities, such as Mianyang, Deyang, and Panzhihua in Sichuan, Guiyang, Zunyi and Liupanshui in Guizhou, Lanzhou and Tianshui in Gansu, and Shiyan in Hubei, emerged as major industrial cities.

However, the designs of many Third Front projects were uneconomic due to their location or deficient due to their hurried construction. For national defense reasons, location choices for the Third Front projects followed the guiding principle "Close to mountains, dispersed, hidden". Many Third Front projects were located in remote areas that were hard to access and far away from supplies and potential markets. The Third Front Movement was carried out in a hurry. Many Third Front projects were simultaneously being designed, constructed, and put in production.

After rapprochement with the United States reduced the national defense considerations underlying the Third Front, investment in its projects decreased. Since the reform of state-owned enterprises starting in the 1980s, many Third Front plants went bankrupt, though some others reinvented themselves and continued to serve as pillars in their respective local economies or were developed into successful private enterprises.

== Definition ==
Mao created the concept of the Third Front to locate critical infrastructure and national defense facilities away from areas where they would be vulnerable to invasion,. thereby ensuring greater military defense in depth. Describing the geographical foundation of the concept, he stated:

Our first front is coastal regions, second front is the line that cuts from Baotou to Lanzhou and southwest is the third front ... in the period of the atomic bomb, we need a strategic rear for retreat, and we should be prepared to go into the mountains [to become guerilla]. We need a place like this.

The "Big Third Front" included the Northwest and Southwest provinces like Qinghai, Sichuan, Guizhou, and Yunnan. In comparison, the "First Front" was composed of the major cities from Manchuria down to the Pearl River Delta and the "Second Front" referred to the smaller cities located further inland from the First Front.

The "Small Third Front" referred to rugged or remote areas in more major provinces like Shanxi, Anhui, and Hebei. As with the Big Third Front, Chinese policymakers intended Small Third Front to form a part of a network of military and industrial power that could withstand invasion or nuclear attack.

== Process ==
Prior to the Third Front construction, the fourteen largest cities in China's potentially vulnerable regions included approximately 60% of the country's manufacturing, 50% of its chemical industries, and 52% of its national defense industries. In particular, the northeast was China's industrial center. China's population centers were concentrated in eastern coastal areas where they would be vulnerable to attack by air or water. In constructing the Third Front, China built a self-sufficient base industrial base area as a strategic reserve in the event of war with the Soviet Union or the United States. The campaign was centrally planned. It was carried out primarily in secret, and was only mentioned in the People's Daily for the first time in 1978.

China built 1,100 Third Front projects (encompassing 1,945 industrial enterprises and research institutions) between 1965 and 1980. Major universities, including both Tsinghua University and Peking University, opened campuses in Third Front cities. The overall cost of Third Front projects during the 1965 to 1980 period was 20.52 billion RMB (the equivalent of US$2.5 billion).

From 1964 to 1974, China invested more than 40% of its industrial capacity in Third Front regions. Ultimately, construction of the Third Front cost accounting for more than a third of China's spending over the 15-year period in which the Third Front construction occurred. The Third Front was the most expensive industrialization campaign of the Mao-era.

Operating on the principle of "choose the best people and best horses for the Third Front," many skilled engineers, scientists, and intellectuals were transferred to Third Front facilities. In this slogan, the "best horses" refers to the best available equipment and resources. Third Front construction methods fused both low-tech and high-tech techniques.

=== Background ===
In 1937 the Nationalist government, preparing for the Second Sino-Japanese War, drafted a policy to move industries to Northwest and Southwest of the country, in particular to develop the mining and heavy industry. Although the policy laid the seeds of industrial development in the Northwest, during the Civil War development eventually died down.

After the failure of the Great Leap Forward, China's leadership slowed the pace of industrialization. It invested more on in China's coastal regions and focused on the production of consumer goods. Construction of the Third Front reversed these trends, developing industry and using mass mobilization for the construction of such industrial projects, an approached that had been suspended after the failures of the Great Leap Forward.

In February 1962, Chen Yun had proposed that the Third Five-Year Plan should "solve the problems of food, clothes, and other life necessities." Zhou Enlai, in his report of the State Council on March 28, also reported that "[the government] should put agriculture in the primary place of the nation's economy. The economic planning should follow the priorities such that agriculture comes first, light industries comes next, heavy industries have the lowest priority". In early 1963, a central planning team (led by Li Fuchun, Li Xiannian, Tan Zhenlin, Bo Yibo) put "solving the problems of food, clothes, and other life necessities" as the priority of economic works in their proposal for the Third Five-Year Plan. The preliminary draft for the Third Five Year Plan, of which Deng Xiaoping was a major author, had no provision for largescale industrialization in the country's interior.

Mao objected to the preliminary proposal because "[t]he Third Five-Year Plan […] need[s] to set basic industries in the Southwest." He said that agricultural and defense industries are like fists, basic industries are like the hip. "The fists cannot be powerful unless the hip is well seated." According to Mao's judgment, there was possibility that China would be involved in a war, while China's population and industries were concentrated on the east coast. As one of his inspirations for the Third Front, Mao cited the negative example of Chiang Kai-Shek's failure to establish sufficient industry away from the coast prior to the Second Sino-Japanese war, resulting in the Nationalist government being forced to retreat to a small inland industrial base in the face of Japanese invasion.

In April 1964, Mao read a General Staff report commissioned by deputy chief Yang Chengwu which evaluated the distribution of Chinese industry, noted that they were primarily concentrated in 14 major coastal cities which were vulnerable to nuclear attack or air raids, and recommended that the General Staff research measures to guard against a sudden attack. Major transportation hubs, bridges, ports and some dams were close to these major cities. Destruction of these infrastructures could lead to disastrous consequences. This evaluation prompted Mao to advocate for the creation of a heavy industrial zone as a safe haven for retreat in the event of foreign invasion during State Planning Meetings in May 1964. Subsequently referred to as the Big Third Front, this inland heavy industrial base was to be built up with the help of enterprises re-located from the coast. At a June 1964 Politburo meeting, Mao also advocated that each province should also establish its own military industrial complex as an additional measure (subsequently named the Small Third Front).

Other key leadership, including Deng Xiaoping, Liu Shaoqi, and Li Fuchun, did not fully support the notion of the Third Front. Instead, they continued to emphasize the coastal development and consumer focus pursuant to the Third Five Year Plan. In their view, small-scale commerce should be emphasized to raise the standard of living. The Gulf of Tonkin Incident on August 2, 1964, however, quickly changed the discussion about the Third Five-Year Plan. Mao became concerned that the United States could strike China's nuclear weapons facilities in Lanzhou and Baotou and advocated even more strongly for development of the Third Front. Other key leadership's fear of attack by the United States increased also, and the Third Front received broad support thereafter. In 1965, Yu Qiuli was given the lead role in developing the Third Five Year Plan, consistent with its changing focus to preparations for the possibility that "the imperialists [would] launch an aggressive war against China."

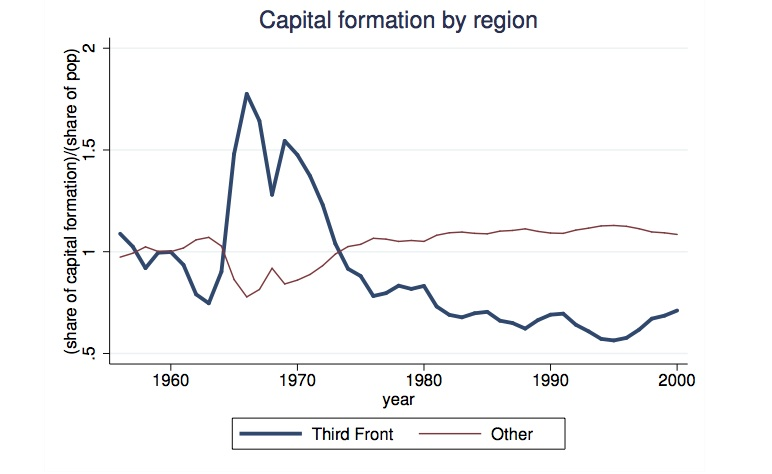
Investment per capita relative to the national mean, Third Front region and non-Third Front region, 1955-2000

=== Construction of the Third Front ===
The hallmark of the Third Front Movement was a strategic shift to China's interior. On August 12, 1964, Zhou Enlai approved enormous industrial development in southwest China: Panzhihua Iron and Steel (in Sichuan), Liupanshui coal mines (in Guizhou), and the building of railroads to connect Sichuan, Yunnan, and Guizhou.

==== Construction process ====
The Third Front construction was primarily carried out in secret, with the location for Third Front projects following the principle of "close to the mountains, dispersed, and hidden". This principle was motivated by national defense considerations; plants were required to be hidden in the mountains and were not allowed to be geographically clustered to minimize the damage of air strikes. These priorities reflected Communist Party leaders' revolutionary experiences as guerillas. Because construction of Third Front projects was based on these non-economic considerations, projects were extremely costly. Dispersing new or re-located industry in rugged terrain required major new infrastructure for utilities, communication, and transportation. Facilities such as factories were sometimes built in subterranean complexes which greatly increased costs. The twenty subterranean powerplants built during the Third Front, for example, required structural reinforcement for the caverns into which they were built and tunnels to allow exhaust to escape.

As Planning Commission Director, Li Fuchun set design rules stating that Third Front projects should not attempt to be "big and complete" or incorporate major administrative, social service, or other buildings not involved in production. Instead, project leaders were directed to make do with what was available, including building rammed earth housing so that more resources could be directed to production. This policy came to be expressed through the slogan, "First build the factory and afterward housing."

Many staff for Third Front projects were assigned from more industrialized areas of China, especially Shanghai and the northeast region. Rural migrants, returned sent-down youth, and locally recruited apprentices also contributed to the Third Front. Potential Third Front workers had to meet physical requirements and had to undergo a political review. The Party forbid recruitment of those whose families were "landlords, rich peasant, counterrevolutionary, bad element, or [...] rightist."

Third Front workers had varying reactions to being selected to work on the Third Front. Rural recruits were inclined to view it as an advancement from work in the countryside to better compensated industrial work. These material benefits helped ease the family separations that could occur as a result of Third Front work assignments. Urban recruits who already worked at state-owned enterprises in more developed coastal areas were more likely to be apprehensive because they already received the benefits of working at such enterprises. If such urban recruits declined a Third Front assignment, they would lose their Party membership and right to work at state-owned enterprises. Third Front workers did, however, receive a "subsidy to keep secrets". According to academic Covell F. Meyskens's analysis of remuneration based on Third Front work unit gazetteers, approximately 75% of the studied work units paid salaries above the national norm for the industrial sector. Aside from material consequences, some urban and rural workers saw Third Front work favorably because it was to express their commitment to building Chinese socialism through bringing industry to undeveloped regions and building an industrial base to help protect China in the event of invasion.

Construction of the Third Front slowed during 1966. As the Cultural Revolution ignited leftist extremism, Lin Biao, Chen Boda also replaced Li Fuchun, Peng Dehuai, and Deng Xiaoping as the actual leaders of the Third Front Movement. By comparison to the rest of the country, Third Front work was less disrupted by the Cultural Revolution, consistent with the broader pattern that central officials acted to protect national security-related work units throughout the country. Panzhihua, for example, was less impacted by the Cultural Revolution.

Besides newly built large projects, many Third Front plants were spinoffs or entirely moved from existing plants in other parts of the country. In a document issued in early 1965, plants in the First and Second Fronts were required to contribute their best equipment and workers to the Third Front Movement. This priority is reflected in the slogans at the time such as "Choose the best people and best horses for the Third Front," "prepare for war, prepare for famine, for the people", and "dig tunnels deep, store grain everywhere, never hegemony." Incomplete statistics show that between 1964 and 1970, 380 large projects, 145 thousand workers and 38 thousand units of equipment, were moved from the coastal areas to the Third Front region. Most of these firms came from cities like Shanghai, Beijing, Shenyang, Dalian, Tianjin, Nanjing. Approximately 400 state-owned enterprises were re-located from coastal cities to secret locations in China's interior regions.

In 1969, Third Front construction accelerated following the Chinese-Soviet border clash at Zhenbao Island. Chinese policy-makers interpreted the Zhenbao Island incident as part of broader pattern of aggression. Perceiving the border clash in connection with the 1968 Soviet invasion of Czechoslovakia, Chinese policy-makers became concerned that the Soviet Union might view the Chinese domestic turmoil during the Cultural Revolution as a reason for similar military intervention. The central Party's efforts to accelerate Third Front work in June 1969 also became entwined with the PLA's enforcement of political discipline and suppression of the factions that had emerged during the Cultural Revolution. Those who did not return to work would be viewed as engaging in "splittist activities" which risked undermining preparations to defend China from potential invasion.

The perceived necessity of rushing construction in preparation for foreign invasion, along with constraints on resources, resulted in defects in many Third Front projects. Among the Third Front railroad projects built between 1969 and 1971, all but the Chengdu-Kunming railway suffered from major defects. Three such projects were completed in the early 1970s but still not fully operational until the late 1970s.

==== Sector-specific significance ====
The primary achievement of railroad construction during the Third Front construction was the building of ten new interprovincial lines. Building the Chengdu-Kunming and the Guiyang-Kunming lines linked all southwest provincial capitals using rail for the first time. The Xiangfan-Chongqing and Hunan-Guizhou connected the central and western provinces by rail for the first time.

Chinese policy-makers determined that vehicle manufacturing should be advanced, and therefore the First Automotive Works transferred a third of its workforce to develop the Second Automobile Works as part of the campaign.

Significantly expanding its nuclear weapons production capacity, China built another set of fissile material production facilities in the Third Front areas. In Sichuan province, China developed an integrated nuclear sector which included uranium mining and processing facilities.

Electronics manufacturing expanded during the Third Front and by 1980, inland China accounted for more than half of the country's electronics production capacity and work force. Major production facilities were built in Sichuan, Shaanxi, and Guizhou, with the most widely known electronics factory being Changhong Electric in Mianyang, Sichuan. From 1969 to 1970, China increased its number of electronics factories by 2.5 times. This was more than twenty times the number of electronics factories China had in 1965.

In the late 1960s and the early 1970s, nearly all work units in China's aerospace industry were established via the Third Front. These Third Front Projects benefitted China's space program through the launch of Dong Fang Hong 1 (China's first satellite) in 1970, expansion of Jiuquan Satellite Launch Center, building Xichang Satellite Launch Center, and building Taiyuan Satellite Launch Center.

==== Administrative mechanisms ====
On September 11, 1964, the Party established centralized organizations to direct the Third Front construction. The highest Third Front-specific administrative body was the Third Front Construction Support and Examination Small Group, which was tasked with providing physical and financial resources for the building of the Third Front. This Small Group was led by Economic Commission Vice Director Gu Mu. It also formed the Southwest Railroad Construction headquarters to oversee railroad development.

Another body, the Southwest Third Front Preparatory Small Group, was established to oversee regional construction and planning. It was led by Li Jingquan. It in turn established a planning group to administer the industrial complex being developed in Panzhihua and another planning group to administer conventional weapons production around Chongqing.

On December 1, 1964, the Economic Commission issued regulations for projects which were being relocated to the Third Front, mandating that all relocated projects had to be approved by the central Party and that none could be approved by local governments themselves.

Administrative changes occurred in February 1965, as the State Council further consolidated central control of the Third Front construction. It converted the Third Front Preparatory Small Group into the Southwest Third Front Commission and required it to work with central ministries in fulfilling needs for labor, equipment, and building materials. The State Council put this Commission within the Economic Commission's supervision and then within the jurisdiction of the Infrastructure Committee when it was created in March 1965.

In an August 19, 1965 report, Li Fuchun, Bo Yibo and Luo Ruiqing suggested that no new projects should be constructed in major cities in the First Front, that new projects should be built concealed in the mountains, and that industrial enterprises, research institutes, and universities should be moved to the Third Front.

Every Third Front project was a state-owned enterprise.

==== Small Third Front ====
In addition to the Big Third Front projects in China's remote regions, a series of "Small Third Front" regions were established in coastal and near-coastal provinces.

The most significant Small Third Front Project was Shanghai's. At its largest, the Shanghai Small Front had 54,000 workers, 17,000 families, and 81 work units. The "rear base" in Anhui was the centerpiece of the project and served as "a multi-function manufacturing base for anti-aircraft and anti-tank weaponry. By 1966, it was producing arms including rocket-propelled grenades and anti-aircraft weapons. Steel mills, chemical plants, instrumentation factories, electronic factories, and extensive road infrastructure were also built in the Shanghai Small Front.

The Shanghai Small Third Front was busy into the early 1970s; like the rest of the Third Front, its work slowed as China and the United States developed their diplomatic relationship. The Shanghai Small Front office ultimately shut down in 1991.

In Shandong, Small Third Front projects focused on the development of electronics and chemical factories. Machinery factors were also moved inland, and others moved to the Big Third Front. Small Third Front projects were also established in Liaoning, Jiangxi, Zhejiang, Fujian, and Guangdong.

=== Ideological factors ===
To recruit and develop the labor force responsible for building Third Front projects, the CCP sought to develop a labor force committed to the Third Front campaign as a way to build socialist modernity. The Party emphasized austere living and working, although not as an end in-and-of-itself, but as a means necessary for socialist development given the level of China's development at the time.

In mobilizing and recruiting workers for Third Front Projects, the Party instructed recruiters to "take Mao's strategic thought as the guiding principle, teach employees to consider the big picture, resolutely obey the needs of the country, take pride in supporting Third Front construction ... and help solve employees' concrete problems." In the official perspective, it was a political privilege to be selected as a Third Front recruit.

Among the important recruitment mechanisms were oath-swearing ceremonies or mobilization meetings held at urban work units or rural communes. At these events, local officials exhorted crowds to join the Third Front construction effort. The Party instructed them to urge workers to "learn from the PLA and the Daqing oilfield and use revolutionary spirit to overcome all difficulties." The Party did not attempt to hide the challenges of working on the Third Front, however, and told local officials to "speak clearly about the difficulties, not boast, and not make empty promises."

Because Chinese policymakers believed that the risks of invasion from foreign powers were imminent, Third Front workers were instructed to "engage in a race against time with American imperialism and Soviet revisionism." Policymakers adopted military-style thinking, framing project selection in the rhetoric of "choos[ing] the proper targets to attack" and "concentrat[ing] forces to wage wars of annihilation" on a focused number of projects. Workers themselves often linked their tasks to broader conflicts, for example describing the drilling of tunnels as an act in opposition to "American wolves," thereby advancing "the people of Vietnam's war" with the United States.

Third Front factories often assigned workers to read three classic Mao speeches: Remember Norman Bethune, The Foolish Old Man who Moved Mountains, and Serve the People.

== Winding down ==
After Nixon's China trip in 1972, investment to the Third Front region gradually declined. Rapprochement between the United States and China decreased the fear of invasion which motivated the Third Front construction. In August 1972, the Planning Commission recommended that the First and Second Fronts no longer view supporting the Third Front as their "primary task," instead downgrading the Third Front assistance to an "important task." The Planning Commission also stated concerns about the amount of Third Front funding leading to neglect of heavy industry elsewhere, as well as insufficient investment in agriculture. After a Party Work Conference in May 1973 resolved to re-direct state investment efforts from the Third Front to the northeast and the coastal regions, the Third Front was no longer the country's most critical economic objective. Agriculture and light industry became more important priorities.

As Reform and Opening Up began in 1978, China began to gradually wind down Third Front projects with a "shut down, cease, merge, transform, and move" strategy. With decrease in state needs for military-related goods, Third Front factories sought to shift to producing civilian goods. Their remote location made it difficult to compete in market conditions for civilian goods.

In 1984, the State Council issued a report concluding that 48% of Third Front enterprises still had marketable products and favorable business prospects. In the Seventh Five-Year Plan between 1986 and 1990, Third Front plants not making a profit were allowed to shut down. In the late 1990s, many Third Front–era enterprises were further affected by the large-scale layoffs of state-owned enterprise workers known as xiagang (下岗), which accelerated population decline and economic stagnation in a number of inland industrial cities, particularly those heavily dependent on a single enterprise or sector. Some Third Front plants moved out of the mountains and caves to nearby small and medium-sized cities where the geography and transportation were less difficult. Plants with workshops spread across many places gathered in one place.

As plants built during the Third Front construction were privatized over the period 1980 to 2000, many became owned by former managers and technicians. As one example, Shaanxi Auto Gear General Works was privatized and became Shaanxi Fast Auto Drive Company; as of 2022 it is the largest automotive transmission manufacturer and its annual revenues exceed US$10 billion.

== Evaluation and legacy ==
Through its distribution of infrastructure, industry, and human capital around the country, the Third Front created favorable conditions for subsequent market development, private enterprise, and township and village enterprises. Once remote regions that were part of the Third Front continue to benefit from the influx of specialists during the Third Front construction and many enterprises, including many private ones, are legacies of the movement. Because each plant built during the Third Front construction was relatively isolated, close knit communities with a high degree of social capital formed, which also helped facilitate the eventual privatization of Third Front plants.

The process of establishing the Third Front brought urban educational standards and pedagogy to China's hinterlands. Third Front areas also received an influx of higher quality food and consumer goods such as clothing, as well as increased access to cultural goods such as films and musical performances.

According to academic Covell F. Meyskens, the Third Front developed out of China's recognition that its lack of intercontinental ballistic missiles and lack of a strong navy meant that it could not shape the strategic considerations of the United States or Soviet Union regarding the use of nuclear weapons or protect its coast. As a result, constructing the Third Front was designed to improve China's relative strength in land warfare and bolster its industrial defense capacity.

A large part of the Third Front Movement was confidential. The mountainous terrain and geographical isolation of the region have added to this concealment. Due to the emphasis that China has placed on concealment of its special weapons capabilities, it is doubtful whether any other country, perhaps even including the United States, has identified all of China's special weapons related facilities. Many of them may still be hiding in the mountains.

Regional energy outputs increased in Third Front areas, which also benefitted related sectors like machine building, railroads, and metallurgy. Cities that benefitted from Third Front construction continue to have generally high degrees of development compared to the rest of their regions. For example, Mianyang has become a high-tech city and Jingmen is regarded as one of China's most innovative cities. However, the economic viability of a number of Third Front cities decreased after the end of the initiative, resulting in a "rust belt." Panzhihua, for example, was a major steel producing Third Front city which has now experienced major population outflows. Its local government now offers subsidies to those who move there and have second or third children. Other "rust belt" cities turned their defunct plants into tourism destinations. Hefei has successfully transitioned to high-tech industries, including those dealing with semiconductors, as well as alternative energy.

Despite the existence of "rust belt" cities, the Third Front Movement effectively narrowed regional disparities. In 1963, 7 western provinces: Yunnan, Guizhou, Sichuan, Shaanxi, Ningxia, and Qinghai, accounted for 10.5% of China's industrial output. This ratio went up to 13.26% by 1978. By 1980, the programs had created a railway grid linking previously isolated parts of western China, in addition to a galaxy of power, aviation and electronic plants, said Zhang Yunchuan, minister of the Commission for Science, Technology and Industry for National Defense. Initial industries brought in by the Third Front plants and infrastructure kick-started the industrialization of China's remote and mountainous west. Existing cities in the Third Front such as Xi'an, Lanzhou, Chengdu, Chongqing, and Guiyang benefited from large investments during this period. Cities such as Shiyan in Hubei, Mianyang and Panzhihua in Sichuan, were literally created by the Third Front Movement.

Additional road and railroad infrastructure drastically reduced travel time to and within Third Front regions. Travel also became more predictable, as the development of transportation infrastructure meant that timetables and schedules for passenger traffic via bus and rail service adhered to set schedules.

Another legacy of the Third Front was an increase in China's resolve in developing industrial systems with region-wide impacts. China's Western Development, initiated in 2001, was shaped by the Third Front. Many cities developed during the Third Front are now involved in the Belt and Road Initiative.

== Historiography of the Third Front ==
Starting in the 1980s, Chinese scholarship on the Third Front began being published. Third Front studies have been published with greater regularity since 2000. Generally, Chinese studies evaluate the Third Front positively, highlighting its role in the development of western China, while also acknowledging its economic difficulties and the harsh living conditions for those involved in Third Front construction. Given the formerly secretive nature of the Third Front, Chinese researchers have benefitted from their unique access to archives, oral histories and interviews of participants, grey literature, and classified materials. Outside of histories specifically focused on the Third Front, the general trend is that the Third Front is not thoroughly addressed, with Chinese histories of 1960s placing greater emphasis on the Great Leap Forward and the Cultural Revolution.

Like Chinese histories of the period, Western histories of 1960s China also tend to focus on the Great Leap Forward and the Cultural Revolution without significant discussion of the Third Front. Compared to Chinese scholarship, Western research on the Third Front is relatively rare. Notable exceptions include the work of Barry Naughton, who published the first Western scholarship on the Third Front in 1988 and 1991. Key academics in the post-2000 increased study of the Third Front include Chen Donglin (publishing in Chinese) and Covell Meyskens (publishing in English).

Since approximately 2007, the number of Third Front documentaries, commentaries, and scholarly organizations in China have increased, as have publications by Third Front workers and their family members. Beginning in 2009, Shanghai University Professor Xu Youwei has led teams of interviewers in conducting oral history research among Shanghai Small Third Front participants.

== Cultural narratives ==
Beginning in the mid-2010s, cultural discourse in China on the Third Front increased, a trend that has included film and documentaries. Academic Paul Kendall writes that former Third Front factories, "with their visually striking combination of industrial architecture and mountainous surroundings have become marketable resources from local governments and entrepreneurs." Industrial heritage tourism prompted Third Front factories to be re-developed as museums, hotels, and leisure complexes.

=== Film and television ===
During the Mao era, there were few documentaries or film reels about the Third Front because of its secret status. Films about Third Front projects during this period (for example, documentaries about railway construction) focused on the individual project and did not reference the secret Third Front or connect the project to the larger campaign.

Later film and television with Third Front narratives include for example:

- Vicissitudes of the Third Front (Sanxian fengyun 三线风云) is a seven-part documentary produced for CCTV.
- The Big Third Front (Da sanxian 大三线) is a ten-part 2017 documentary produced for CCTV's National Memory (Guojia jiyi 国家记忆).
- Migrants of the Western Third Front (Qiantu de ren zhi xibu sanxian jianshe 迁徙的人之西部三线建设), a 2007 documentary.
- Apprentice Soldiers of the Third Front (Sanxian xuebing 三线学兵), a 2009 documentary.
- The 2014 ten-part documentary The Railway Corps Forever (Yongyuan de tiedao bing 永远的铁道兵) directed by Liu Weiyang, included episodes on the Third Front.
- The Third Front is the setting for the Chinese film called Shanghai Dreams directed by Wang Xiaoshuai. Set in the 1980s, it is a bleak and thoughtful drama that shows the life of some ordinary families who had moved there and would like to move back to Shanghai.
- 11 Flowers, also directed by Wang Xiaoshuai.
- 24 City, directed by Jia Zhangke, follows three generations of characters related to a Third Front plant in Chengdu.

== See also ==
- China Western Development, post-reform policy to invest more in interior regions
