= List of Chinese films of 1993 =

A list of mainland Chinese films released in 1993:

Title	Director	Cast	Genre	Notes
After Separation	Xia Gang	Ge You, Xu Fan	Romance	
Beijing Bastards	Zhang Yuan	Cui Jin	Drama	
Blood Shedding Over the Yellow Desert	Liu Guoquan	Hao Yan, Jiang Gengchen, Lijing Zhou	Wuxia	
The Blue Kite	Tian Zhuangzhuang	Lü Liping	Drama	Grand Prix winner at the 1993 Tokyo International Film Festival
Chatterbox	Liu Miaomiao	Li Lei	Drama	
The Days	Wang Xiaoshuai	Liu Shaodong, Yu Hong	Drama	Wang Xiaoshuai's directorial debut
Far Far Place	Teng Wenji		Drama	
Farewell My Concubine	Chen Kaige	Gong Li, Zhang Fengyi, Leslie Cheung	Drama	Palme d'Or winner at Cannes
For Fun	Ning Ying		Comedy/Drama	
Mr. Wang: Flames of Desire	Zhang Jianya		Comedy	
No More Applause	Xia Gang	Gai Xiaoling	Drama	
An Old Man and his Dog	Xie Jin	Siqin Gaoiwa	Drama	
Red Beads	He Jianjun			
Stand Straight, Don't Bend Over	Huang Jianxin	Gong Feng, Da Shichang	Comedy	
Sub Husband	Chen Guoxing		Drama	
Sword Brothers	Liu Guoquan	Zhou Lijing	Action/Drama	
Temporary Dad	Chen Guoxing	Chen Peisi	Drama	
The Trail	Zhou Xiaowen	Jiang Wen	Action/Drama	
A Woman from North Shaanxi	Yang Fengliang	Jia Hongsheng; Luo Yan	Drama	
Woman Sesame Oil Maker	Xie Fei	Siqin Gaowa	Drama	Golden Bear winner at Berlin

== See also ==
- 1993 in China
