= 58th Berlin International Film Festival =

2008 film festival in Berlin, Germany

- Festival poster
- Opening film: Shine a Light
- Closing film: Be Kind Rewind
- Location: Berlin, Germany
- Founded: 1951
- Awards: Golden Bear: Elite Squad
- No. of films: 310 films
- Festival date: 7–17 February 2008
- Website: Website

Berlin International Film Festival chronology
- 59th 57th

The 58th annual Berlin International Film Festival was held from February 7 to February 17, 2008. The festival opened with Martin Scorsese's documentary film Shine a Light. Be Kind Rewind by Michel Gondry served as the closing film. Greek filmmaker Costa Gavras, was selected to serve as the Jury President for the main competition.

The Golden Bear was awarded to Elite Squad directed by José Padilha. The retrospective dedicated to Spanish filmmaker Luis Buñuel was shown at the festival.

== Juries ==
The following people were announced as being on the jury for the festival:

=== Main Competition ===
- Costa-Gavras, Greek filmmaker and producer - Jury President
- Uli Hanisch, German production designer
- Diane Kruger, German actress
- Walter Murch, American director and editor
- Shu Qi, Taiwanese actress and model
- Alexander Rodnyansky, Russian producer

=== Best First Feature Award Jury ===
- Ben Barenholtz, American producer and distributor
- Dominique Cabrera, French filmmaker
- Jasmila Žbanić, Bosnian filmmaker and producer

=== Short Film Competition Jury ===
- Marc Barbé, French actor and director
- Ada Solomon, Romanian producer
- Laura Tonke, German actress

== Official Sections ==
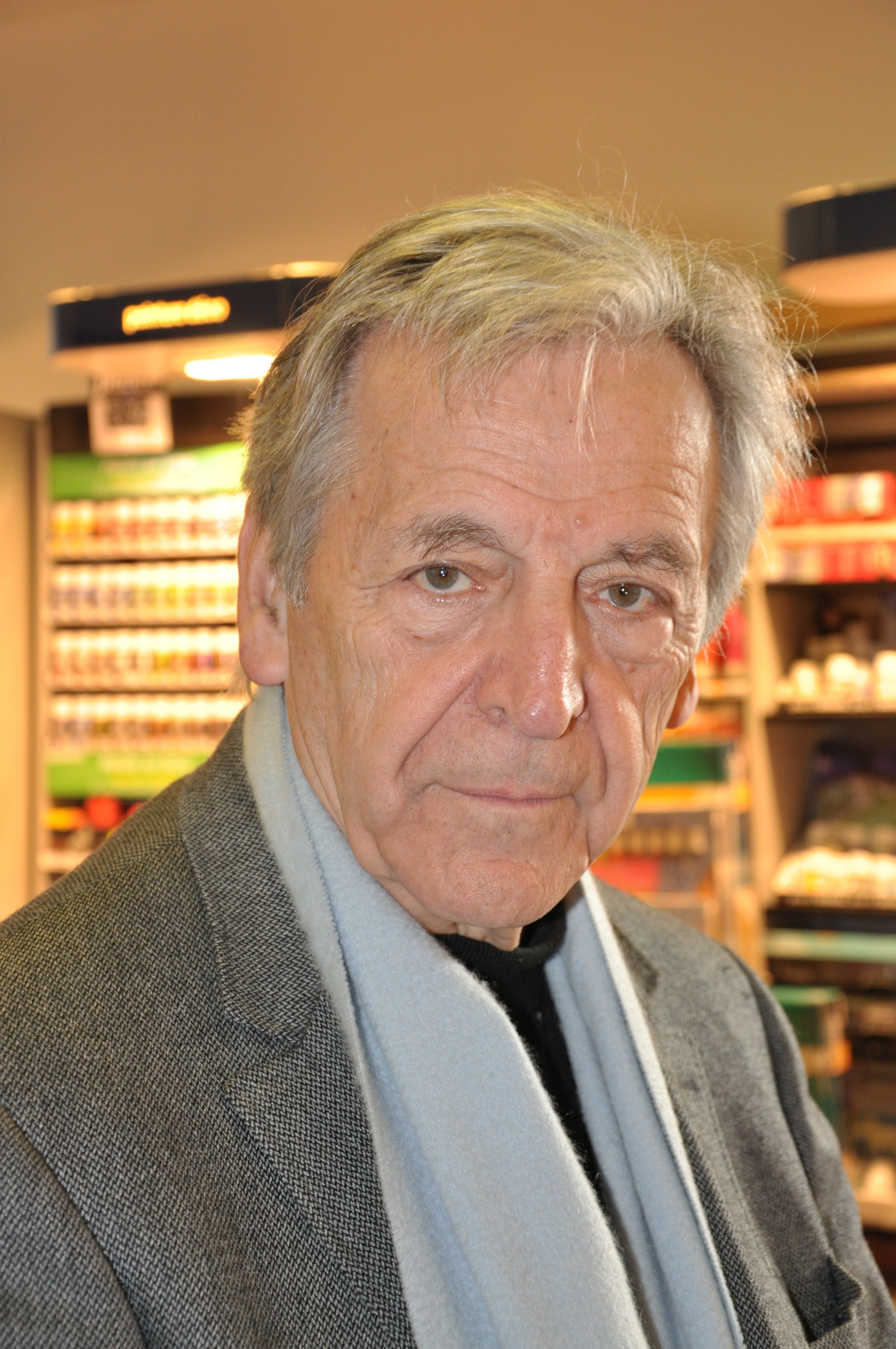
Costa Gavras, Jury President

=== Main Competition ===
The following films were in competition for the Golden Bear and Silver Bear awards:

English title	Original title	Director(s)	Production Country
Ballast		Lance Hammer	United States
Cherry Blossoms	Kirschblüten – Hanami	Doris Dörrie	Germany
Sparrow	文雀	Johnnie To	Hong Kong
Black Ice	Musta jää	Petri Kotwica	Finland, Germany
Elegy		Isabel Coixet	United States
Elite Squad	Tropa de Elite	José Padilha	Brazil
Gardens of the Night		Damian Harris	United States, United Kingdom
Happy-Go-Lucky		Mike Leigh	United Kingdom
Heart of Fire	Feuerherz	Luigi Falorni	Eritrea, Germany, United Kingdom
In Love We Trust	左右	Wang Xiaoshuai	China
I've Loved You So Long	Il y a longtemps que je t'aime	Philippe Claudel	France, Germany
Julia		Erick Zonca	France, United States, Mexico, Belgium
Kabei: Our Mother	母べえ	Yoji Yamada	Japan
Lady Jane		Robert Guédiguian	France
Lake Tahoe		Fernando Eimbcke	Mexico
Night and Day	밤과 낮	Sang-soo Hong	South Korea
Quiet Chaos	Caos calmo	Antonello Grimaldi	Italy
Restless		Amos Kollek	Israel, Germany
Standard Operating Procedure		Errol Morris	United States
The Song of Sparrows	آواز گنجشک‌ها	Majid Majidi	Iran
There Will Be Blood		Paul Thomas Anderson	United States

== Official Awards ==
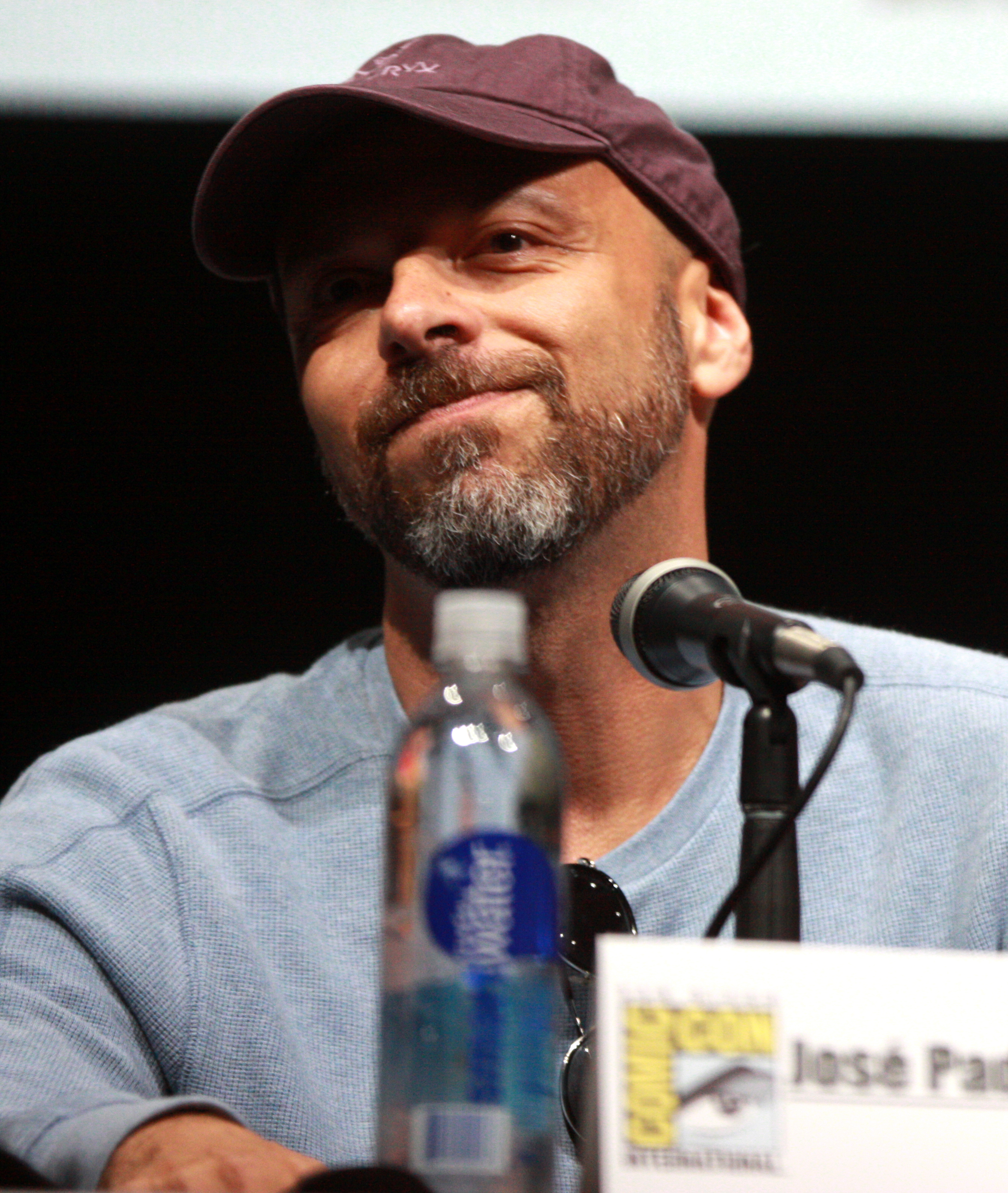
José Padilha, winner of the Golden Bear at the festival

The following prizes were awarded by the Jury:

=== Main Competition ===
- Golden Bear: Elite Squad by José Padilha
- Silver Bear Grand Prize of the Jury: Standard Operating Procedure by Errol Morris
- Silver Bear for Best Director: Paul Thomas Anderson for There Will Be Blood
- Silver Bear for Best Actor: Reza Naji for The Song of Sparrows
- Silver Bear for Best Actress: Sally Hawkins for Happy-Go-Lucky
- Silver Bear for Best Screenplay: Wang Xiaoshuai for In Love We Trust
- Silver Bear for Outstanding Artistic Contribution: Jonny Greenwood for There Will Be Blood (score)
- Alfred Bauer Prize: Fernando Eimbcke for Lake Tahoe

== Independent Awards ==
=== FIPRESCI Award ===
- Fernando Eimbcke for Lake Tahoe
