= Montferrand =

Montferrand may refer to:

== Places ==
- Montferrand (crusader castle), a crusader fortress near present-day Baarin, Syria
- Montferrand, Puy-de-Dôme, a former town, now part of Clermont-Ferrand, France
- Montferrand, Aude, a commune in the department of Aude, France
- Montferrand-du-Périgord, a commune in the department of Dordogne, France
- Montferrand-la-Fare, a commune in the department of Drôme, France
- Montferrand-le-Château, a commune in the department of Doubs, France

== People ==
- Auguste de Montferrand (1786–1858), French neoclassical architect
- Hadrien de Montferrand (born 1976), French specialist in Chinese contemporary art
- Jos Montferrand (1802–1864), French-Canadian logger and strongman

== Other uses ==
- ASM Clermont Auvergne, a rugby union club based in Clermont-Ferrand, France
