= Chinese Portrait =

2018 Chinese documentary film

- Film poster
- 我的镜头
- Directed by: Wang Xiaoshuai
- Produced by: Isabelle Glachant; Liu Xuan; Qian Yini
- Cinematography: Wu Di; Zeng Jian; Zeng Hui; Piao Xinghai
- Edited by: Valérie Loiseleux
- Production companies: Front Co. Films; Chinese Shadows; WXS Productions; Dongchun Films (Beijing) Co.
- Distributed by: Asian Shadows; Cinema Guild
- Release date: October 12, 2018
- Running time: 79 minutes
- Country: China
- Language: None

Chinese Portrait (Simplified Chinese: 我的镜头, Pinyin: Wǒ de Jìngtóu) is a 2018 documentary film directed by Wang Xiaoshuai. It was shot over ten years in the urban east and the rural northwest of China. It is Wang's first full-length documentary.

== Synopsis ==
Chinese Portrait is predominantly composed of a series of around 60 portraits shot in video and film. They feature long shots of people standing motionless while life goes on around them. Subjects include train passengers, farmers, students, factory workers, tourists, and construction workers in both urban and rural areas of China; Wang appears in many shots. The film has no dialogue. Through these portraits, Wang aimed to give an authentic portrait of different aspects of China and portray the rapid change in Chinese society.

== Production ==
Chinese Portrait was filmed over seven years, starting in 2009, in a variety of location in eastern and northwestern China, including Beijing, Shanghai, Ningxia, and Qinghai. It was directed by Wang Xiaoshuai, produced by Isabelle Glachant and Xuan Liu, and executive produced by Qian Yini, with cinematography by Wu Di, Zeng Hui, Zeng Jian, and Piao Xinghai, sound mixing by Mikaël Barre, and editing and sound design by Valerie Loiseleux. It was produced by Front Films Co. and Chinese Shadows, with distribution by Asian Shadows internationally and Cinema Guild in the United States.

== Release ==
Chinese Portrait was initially released on October 12, 2018 at the Busan International Film Festival. It premiered in the United States on December 13, 2020 at the Museum of the Moving Image in New York City.

== Reception ==
Chinese Portrait has generally been received positively by critics, holding a rating of 90% on Rotten Tomatoes and 81 on Metacritic. Writing for RogerEbert.com, Scout Tafoya said that the film represents Wang's view of China, fitting well within his filmography while also stunning on its own. In The Hollywood Reporter, Clarence Tsui called Chinese Portrait a "powerful, panoramic survey of a society in transformation," and said it was key to understanding both Wang and the Sixth Generation's outlook on China. However, G. Allen Johnson, writing for the San Francisco Chronicle, criticized the film as being more of an art installation than a movie, and called it "art house arrogance run amok."
