= Drifters (2003 film) =

2003 Chinese-Hong Kong film by Wang Xiaoshuai

- Film poster
- Chinese: 二弟
- Literal meaning: younger/second brother
- Hanyu Pinyin: èr dì
- Directed by: Wang Xiaoshuai
- Written by: Wang Xiaoshuai
- Produced by: Peggy Chiao; Yong Ning; Hsu Hsiao-ming
- Starring: Duan Yihong; Shu Yan; Zhao Yiwei; Tang Yang; Jin Peizhu
- Cinematography: Wu Di
- Edited by: Liao Ching-sung
- Music by: Wang Feng
- Production companies: People Workshop; Purple Light Films
- Distributed by: Arc Light Films
- Release date: May 20, 2003 (Cannes)
- Running time: 120 minutes
- Countries: China; Hong Kong
- Language: Mandarin Chinese

Drifters (Chinese: 二弟) is a 2003 film directed by Wang Xiaoshuai. The film is a production of China's People Workshop and Hong Kong's Purple Light Films with international distribution through the Taipei-based company Arc Light Films. Drifters premiered in the 2003 Cannes Film Festival as part of the Un Certain Regard competition.

Drifters follows the story of a young slacker, Hong Yunsheng, who has become something of a local celebrity partly due to his repeated failures as a stowaway. After spending several years abroad in the U.S. as an illegal immigrant, Hong returns to his hometown in Fujian. There, Hong attempts to reconnect with his illegitimate son.

== Cast ==
- Duan Yihong as Hong Yunsheng, the titular drifter in the film. Hong spent several years in the United States as an undocumented immigrant before being deported back to his home in Fujian. He spends his days loafing around his home town.
- Shu Yan as Wu Ruifang, a member of a travelling Shanghai Opera troupe. Hong's love interest.
- Zhao Yiwei
- Tang Yang
- Jin Peizhu

== Plot ==
Hong Yunsheng is a jobless wanderer in Fujian. Attempting to find a better life in the United States, he enters the country as an undocumented worker. While there, his American dream quickly falls apart when he has a child with his boss's daughter. He is then told not to visit his son and is made to sign a contract prohibiting contact. He violates this agreement by continuing to visit his son. Enraged, Hong's boss informs the INS and has him deported back to Fujian.

Upon returning home, Hong again takes up his old habits, wandering around the town, unemployed and listless. At the same time, he attempts to find romance with a traveling opera performer, Wu Ruifang. Eventually, he hears that the child he fathered in the United States is coming to Fujian. Desiring to see the child he has never known, Hong and his boss argue until eventually Hong takes desperate measures and kidnaps the boy.

== Reception ==
Unlike Wang's previous film, Beijing Bicycle, Drifters received mixed reviews from western critics. Derek Elley of Variety claimed that the film's "potentially involving story is too often chopped off at the knees," and also found the movie's cast to be limited by inexperience. Other critics were even more critical, arguing that the film relied on over-direction to mask a simple and "syrupy" melodrama.

However, some critics were more positive. Bérénice Reynaud of Senses of Cinema found Drifters to be superior to the "superficial" Beijing Bicycle, and placed it in the growing category of "mature, disturbing, thought-provoking masterpieces inspired by globalisation."

== Release ==
Like many of Wang's films, Drifters was screened in the Un Certain Regard competition of the 2003 Cannes Film Festival on May 20. In addition to this, the film was screened at ten major film festivals around the world. These included:

- 2003 Toronto International Film Festival (Contemporary World Film), September 5, 2003
- 2003 Vancouver International Film Festival (official selection), October 2003
- 2003 Hawaii International Film Festival (official selection), November 2, 2003
- 2003 Nantes Three Continents Festival (official selection), November 25, 2003
- 2003 AFI Film Festival (official selection), November 2003
- 2003 Thessaloniki International Film Festival (Official Programme), November 2003
- 2004 Rotterdam International Film Festival (official selection), January 24, 2004
- 2004 Seattle International Film Festival (official selection), May 31, 2004
- 2004 Karlovy Vary Film Festival (official selection), July 7, 2004
- 2004 Calgary International Film Festival (official selection), October 2, 2004

=== Home media ===
Drifters was released on Region 1 DVD on September 15, 2005 by Film Movement. The DVD included the original Mandarin language track with English subtitles. Special features on the disc included biographies of the cast and crew, as well as a short film, Robot Boy by Ted Passon. The disc's aspect ratio was 1.78:1 in letterbox format.
