= Frozen (1997 film) =

1997 Chinese-Dutch-Hong Kong film by Wang Xiaoshuai

- Fox Lorber DVD cover
- Traditional Chinese: 極度寒冷
- Simplified Chinese: 极度寒冷
- Literal meaning: extremely cold
- Hanyu Pinyin: jídù hánlěng
- Directed by: Wang Xiaoshuai
- Written by: Pang Ming; Wang Xiaoshuai
- Produced by: Xu Wei; Shu Kei
- Starring: Jia Hongsheng; Ma Xiaoqing
- Cinematography: Yang Shu
- Edited by: Qing Qing
- Music by: Roeland Dol
- Distributed by: International Film Circuit, Inc. (U.S.)
- Release date: 23 October 1997 (Netherlands)
- Running time: 95 minutes
- Countries: China; Netherlands; Hong Kong
- Language: Mandarin

Frozen (Chinese: 极度寒冷) is a 1997 film directed by Wang Xiaoshuai. A Chinese-Dutch-Hong Kong co-production, the film was originally shot in 1994, but was banned by Chinese authorities and had to be smuggled out of the country. Moreover, Wang was operating under a blacklisting from the Chinese Film Bureau that was imposed after his previous film, The Days, was screened internationally without government approval. As such, Wang was forced to use the pseudonym "Wu Ming" (literally "Anonymous") while making this film.

The film, supposedly based on a true story, follows a young performance artist, Qi Lei, who attempts to create a masterpiece centred on the theme of death. After two "acts" where he simulates death, he decides that his final act will be a true suicide through hypothermia.

Frozen was originally titled The Great Game (simplified Chinese: 大游戏; traditional Chinese: 大游戲; pinyin: Dà yóuxi). This was meant to reflect the attitude of both the film and the artist portrayed within it to treat death and suicide as a game or a manipulation.

Canadian scholar Erik Bordeleau has interpreted Frozen as an allegory of the aftermath of the 1989 Tiananmen Square protests and massacre in Beijing. Qi Lei’s “experience of a radical loss of social subjectivity, staged in performative terms, powerfully echoes also that of the Tiananmen survivors, those whose lives did not come to an end, as did the world to which they belonged.”

== Casting ==
Like Wang's first film, The Days, Frozen was cast primarily with friends of Wang Xiaoshuai. Unlike in his earlier film, the two leads of Frozen were professional actors who would become major figures in the sixth generation movement. Actor Jia Hongsheng was selected to play Qi Lei, a performance artist who decides to make his own death his final work. Jia would go on to star in other sixth generation films, notably with director Lou Ye in Weekend Lover (1994) and Suzhou River (2000). Wang selected Jia in part because he was unconventional looking and in Wang's words, Jia "does not look like an actor." But because Jia was Wang's friend, he did not demand payment, thus allowing the film to operate on a smaller budget.

The other lead, Shao Yun, Qi Lei's girlfriend, was played by actress Ma Xiaoqing. Her casting was done in part to create parity with Jia. Wang wanted both leads to be professional actors.

== Production ==
The film proved to be difficult to produce, much like its predecessor. However, the problems that plagued Frozen were far different from the obstacles of The Days. By far, the greatest issue during filming was the content of the film. Several key scenes required actor Jia Hongsheng to recreate performance art, such as soap-eating, and in the film's climax, self-freezing. Both scenes were difficult to capture; however, the scene in which Jia lays in ice for several minutes was the most dangerous to shoot. Indeed, Wang had to have Jia sent to the hospital immediately after shooting to check for permanent damage.

== DVD release ==
Frozen was released on DVD by Fox Lorber on 22 February 2000 in the United States. The Fox Lorber edition was basic, but included English subtitles and some extra features, including production notes and cast and crew filmographies.

== Awards and nominations ==
Frozen was nominated at the International Film Festival Rotterdam for the Tiger Award, and won the FIPRESCI Award for Special Mention.
