= In Love We Trust =

- Film poster
- Directed by: Wang Xiaoshuai
- Written by: Wang Xiaoshuai
- Produced by: Isabelle Glachant; Huang Bin
- Starring: Liu Weiwei; Zhang Jiayi; Cheng Taisheng; Yu Nan
- Cinematography: Wu Di
- Edited by: Yang Hongyu
- Music by: Dou Wei
- Production companies: Duoji Production; Qinghong Debo; WXS Productions; Stellar Mega Media
- Distributed by: Films Distribution
- Release date: February 8, 2008 (Berlinale)
- Running time: 115 minutes
- Country: China
- Language: Mandarin

In Love We Trust (Chinese: 左右; pinyin: Zuǒ yòu; lit. 'left', 'right') is a 2008 Chinese drama film directed by Wang Xiaoshuai and starring Liu Weiwei, Zhang Jiayi, Cheng Taisheng, and Yu Nan. It is alternatively known by its literal English translation, Left Right.

Originally set to premiere at the 2007 Cannes Film Festival and then at the 64th Venice International Film Festival the same year, the film eventually missed both, ultimately premiering at the 58th Berlin International Film Festival in 2008. The film was picked up for international distribution by the Paris-based company Films Distribution.

== Plot ==
The film follows a divorced couple living in modern-day China who discover that their daughter is dying of leukemia. Doctors inform them, however, that the child can only be saved with stem cells from an umbilical cord of a sibling.

However, both parents have since remarried. The film follows the emotional strain that this development brings to both marriages.

== Cast ==
- Liu Weiwei as Mei Zhu, the mother
- Zhang Jiayi as Xiao Lu, the father
- Cheng Taisheng as Xie Huaicai, Mei Zhu's second husband, the stepfather
- Yu Nan as Dong Fan, Xiao Lu's second wife, the stepmother
- Zhang Chuqian as Hehe, the daughter
- Gao Yuanyuan as a teacher at a school

== Release ==
In Love We Trust was originally scheduled for a release in the 2007 Cannes Film Festival along with actor-director Jiang Wen's The Sun Also Rises. Ultimately both films failed to make the festival. Sources stated that In Love We Trust was officially delayed due to bureaucratic red tape, as it awaited examination by the Chinese Film Bureau.

The film missed another opportunity to premiere at a major international film festival when it failed to debut at the 64th Venice International Film Festival in August 2007. This time, the reason for dropping out was not bureaucratic, but rather because post-production editing had not yet been completed.

In late 2007, it was announced that In Love We Trust would premiere at the 58th Berlin International Film Festival in 2008 where it would compete for the Golden Bear. The film would ultimately go on to win the Silver Bear for Best Screenplay in Berlin, with the Golden Bear going to the Brazilian film Tropa de Elite.
