= Liu Xiaodong =

Chinese artist

Liu Xiaodong (simplified Chinese: 刘小东; traditional Chinese: 劉小東; pinyin: Liú Xiǎodōng; born 1963 in Liaoning, China) is a contemporary Chinese artist.

== Education ==
Liu was born in 1963 in the small industrial village of Jincheng, a pulp and paper-producing center on the outskirts of Jinzhou in Liaoning province. At age 17 he moved to Beijing to study art at the Central Academy of Fine Arts (中央美术学院). He received a Bachelor of Fine Arts in oil painting in 1988, and a Master of Fine Arts in oil painting in 1995, both from CAFA. In 1998–99 he continued his studies overseas at the Academy of Fine Arts at the Complutense University of Madrid in Spain. He now holds tenure as a professor in the painting department at CAFA.

== Art ==
Liu creates large-scale paintings that depict contemporary life and address global issues such as displacement, environmental crises, and economic shifts. His work focuses on the representation of places of "contradiction and conflict." In 2016, he developed an automated painting machine that transforms city photographs into real-time paintings in his signature style. In these works, he adopted monochromy “to convey the most complicated psychological activity in the simplest way.”

== Filmography ==
1990

The Days: Began participating with the Chinese Independent Film Movement, starting as the lead role in The Days, which was named one of the top 100 most important international films of the past century by the BBC.

1993

Beijing Bastards: Art director for the movie.

2006

Dong ("East",《东》): Starred in a documentary of the Three Gorges and Thailand painting project by director Jia Zhangke. This film entered the 2006 Venice Film Festival as a candidate for the Golden Lion Award.

2011

Hometown Boy: This documentary follows Liu Xiaodong as he returns to his hometown thirty years later, and paints his family, friends and his hometown.

== Public exhibitions ==
2021

- "Liu Xiaodong: Your Friends," UCCA Edge, Shanghai, China
- "Liu Xiaodong: Borders," Dallas Contemporary, Dallas, USA

2020

- "Liu Xiaodong," Lisson Gallery, East Hampton, USA

2019

- "Liu Xiaodong: Expedition to Uummannaq, Greenland" Louisiana Museum of Modern Art, Copenhagen, Denmark
- "Weight of Insomnia," Lisson Gallery, London, UK

2018

- "Slow Homecoming -- 1983-2018 Retrospective," Kunsthalle Düsseldorf & NRW-Forum Düsseldorf, Düsseldorf, Germany

2017

- "Chittagong," Massimo De Carlo Gallery, Milan, Italy

2016

- "Liu Xiaodong in South Africa," ESLITE GALLERY, Taipei, Taiwan
- "Liu Xiaodong: Migrazioni," Fondazione Palazzo Strozzi, Florence, Italy

2015

- "Painting as Shooting," Giorgio Cini Foundation, Venice, Italy; Faurschou Foundation, Beijing, China and Copenhagen, Denmark
- “Diary of an Empty City," Faurschou Foundation, Beijing, China

2014

- "Liu Xiaodong in Indonesia," ESLITE GALLERY, Taipei, Taiwan
- "Childhood Friends Getting Fat - Moving Image of Liu Xiaodong 1984-2014," Minsheng Art Museum, Shanghai, China
- "Liu Xiaodong's Two Projects," Shao Zhong Foundation Art Museum, Guangzhou, China

2013

- "Liu Xiaodong: Hometown Boy Print Series," ESLITE GALLERY Project One, Hong Kong
- "In Between Israel and Palestine," Mary Boone Gallery, New York, USA
- "Hometown Boy," Seattle Art Museum, Seattle, USA
- "Liu Xiaodong: Half Street," Lisson Gallery, London, England
- "Liu Xiaodong in Hotan," Today Art Museum, Beijing, China

2012

- "The Process of Painting," Graz Art Museum, Graz, Austria
- "Liu Xiaodong in Hotan," Xinjiang Arts Center, Ürümqi, China
- "Liu Xiaodong and Yan Pei Ming: Dual Exhibition," Massimo De Carlo Gallery, Milan, Italy

2011

- "Hometown Boy: Liu Xiaodong," ESLITE GALLERY, Taipei, Taiwan

2010

- "Liu Xiaodong: Hometown Boy," Ullens Center for Contemporary Arts, Beijing, China
- "Liu Xiaodong: Yan' Guan Town," Mary Boone Gallery, New York, USA

2009

- "Traces: Liu Xiaodong," Angle Gallery, Beijing, China
- Inaugural Exhibition, Hadrien de Montferrand Gallery, Beijing, China

2008

- "Qinghai-Tibet Plateau and Beijing Girls: New Paintings by Liu Xiaodong," Mary Boone Gallery, New York, USA
- "Displacement: The Three Gorges Dam and Contemporary Chinese Art," Smart Museum of Art, Chicago, USA

2007

- "Liu Xiaodong," ESLITE GALLERY, Taipei, Taiwan
- "The Richness of Life: The Personal Photographs of Contemporary Chinese Artist Liu Xiaodong 1984-2006," Timezone 8, Beijing, China

2006

- Biennale of Sydney 2006, Biennale of Sydney, Sydney, NSW
- "The Three Gorges Project - Paintings by Liu Xiaodong," Asian Art Museum, San Francisco, USA
- "Liu Xiaodong: Painting from Life," Guangdong Museum of Art, Guangdong, China
- "Hot Bed: A Painting Project by Liu Xiaodong," Tang Contemporary Art Gallery, Bangkok, Thailand

2005

- "Childhood Friend Getting Fat," LOFT Gallery, Paris, France
- "Sketches from the Battlefield: Portraits of the New 18 Disciples of Buddha," ESLITE GALLERY, Taipei, Taiwan
- "The Wall - Reshaping Contemporary Chinese Art," Albright-Knox Art Gallery, Buffalo, USA
- "Regeneration - Contemporary Chinese Art from China and the U.S.," Arizona State University Art Museum, Tempe, USA
- The Second Beijing International Art Biennale 2005, Beijing International Art Biennale, Beijing, China
- "Mahjong - Chinesische Gegenwartskunst," Kunstmuseum Bern, Bern, Switzerland

2004

- "Three Gorges," China Art Archives & Warehouse (CAAW), Beijing, China
- "Regeneration - Contemporary Chinese Art," David Winton Bell Gallery, Providence, USA
- "Bunker Museum of Contemporary Art - 18 Solo Exhibitions," Bunker Museum of Contemporary Art, Kinmen, Taiwan

2003

- "Alors, la Chine?," Centre Pompidou - Musée National d´Art Moderne, Paris, France
- "Liu Xiaodong: State of Survival," ESLITE GALLERY, Taipei, Taiwan

2002

- The 1st Guangzhou Triennial, Guangzhou Triennial, Guangzhou, China
- "Liu Xiaodong at Donghai," Art Center of Donghai University, Taichung, Taiwan

2001

- "Liu Xiaodong," LOFT Gallery, Paris, France

2000

- "Liu Xiaodong 1990-2000," Central Academy of Fine Arts Art Museum, Beijing, China
- "Liu Xiaodong and His Time," LIMN Art Gallery, San Francisco, USA

== Literature ==
- Heinz-Norbert Jocks: Stille Tage in New York. Ein Gespräch mit dem chinesischen Künstler Liu Xiaodong. Frankfurter Allgemeine Sonntagszeitung, Frankfurt, 18. April 2021, p. 36.
