= Hadrien de Montferrand =

French dealer in Chinese contemporary art

Hadrien de Montferrand (French: [adʁjɛ̃ d(ə) mɔ̃fɛʁɑ̃]; born 1976) is a French dealer in Chinese contemporary art. He has worked as marketing director for Artcurial, the largest French auction house, and for the UCCA Center for Contemporary Art in Beijing. He has headed the development of the gallery in Beijing since 2009.

== Biography ==
After graduating in art history at La Sorbonne in parallel of his business studies, he worked for two years in China for Unilever.

In 2002, he came back in France where he was appointed head of the marketing department of the largest French auction house, Artcurial. After five years in Paris, he was sent to China to create an auction house in Shanghai, a project that has been aborted.

In 2008, he became development manager of the Ullens Center of Contemporary Art, founded in 2007 by Guy Ullens and his wife.

In 2009, he opened the first HdM Gallery in China dedicated to works on paper, in partnership with Laurent Dassault.

In 2018, he opened his third space, in London's Mayfair art district.

He works with Chinese artists including Liu Xiaodong, Wang Du, Sui Jianguo or Mao Yan and with Western artists including Martial Raysse, Barthélémy Toguo, Manuel Mathieu, and Elias Crespin.

== Art forums ==
In 2009, he spoke at the International Forum on Chinese Antiques & Artworks Auction in Beijing.

In 2010, de Montferrand was a jury member of the Foire Internationale du Dessin won by Kristina Heckova, and the prize consisted in a one-month exhibition in the gallery.

He is a member and art advisor of the China Cultural Heritage Foundation.
