= List of Chinese films of the 1990s =

This is a list of films produced in mainland China ordered by year of release in the 1990s. For an alphabetical listing of Chinese films see Category:Chinese films

== 1990 ==
- List of Chinese films of 1990

== 1991 ==
- List of Chinese films of 1991

== 1992 ==
- List of Chinese films of 1992

== 1993 ==
- List of Chinese films of 1993

== 1994 ==
- List of Chinese films of 1994

== 1995 ==
- List of Chinese films of 1995

== 1996 ==
- List of Chinese films of 1996

== 1997 ==
- List of Chinese films of 1997

== 1998 ==
- List of Chinese films of 1998

== 1999 ==
- List of Chinese films of 1999

== See also ==
- Cinema of China
- Best 100 Chinese Motion Pictures as chosen by the 24th Hong Kong Film Awards
