= Love Speaks =

- Directed by: Li Zhi
- Screenplay by: Wei Jia
- Produced by: Peggy Chiao
- Starring: Jaycee Chan; Amber Kuo
- Release date: November 8, 2013
- Running time: 93 minutes
- Country: China
- Language: Mandarin
- Box office: US$3,730,000

Love Speaks (Chinese: 意外的恋爱时光) is a 2013 Chinese romance film directed by Li Zhi and starring Jaycee Chan and Amber Kuo.

== Cast ==
- Jaycee Chan as Zhou Tong
- Amber Kuo as Wang Leqing
- Archie Kao as Shao Dong
