= Wu Di (cinematographer) =

Chinese cinematographer

- Occupation(s): Cinematographer, film director
- Years active: 1990s-present
- Awards: Dragons and Tigers Award; 1995 Goldfish

Chinese name
- Traditional Chinese: 鄔迪
- Simplified Chinese: 邬迪
Transcriptions
Standard Mandarin
- Hanyu Pinyin: Wū Dí

Wu Di (simplified Chinese: 邬迪; traditional Chinese: 鄔迪) is a Chinese cinematographer and one-time film director, known for his collaborations with Sixth Generation director, Wang Xiaoshuai. The director of photography for over ten films (all with mainland directors), Wu Di also wrote and directed a feature of his own, 1995's Goldfish.

== Filmography ==
=== As cinematographer ===
Year	English Title	Chinese Title	Director
1993	The Days	冬春的日子	Wang Xiaoshuai
1993	For Fun	找乐	Ning Ying
1994	Gone Forever with My Love	永失我爱	Feng Xiaogang
1995	Postman	邮差	He Jianjun
2001	Butterfly Smile	蝴蝶微笑	He Jianjun
2002	Eyes of a Beauty	西施眼	Guan Hu
2003	Drifters	二弟	Wang Xiaoshuai
2005	Shanghai Dreams	青红	Wang Xiaoshuai
2005	You and Me	我们俩	Ma Liwen
2008	In Love We Trust	左右	Wang Xiaoshuai
2008	Lost and Found	我叫刘跃进	Ma Liwen
2010	Chongqing Blues	日照重慶	Wang Xiaoshuai

=== As director ===
Year	English Title	Chinese Title	Notes
1995	Goldfish	金鱼	Dragons and Tigers Award at the Vancouver International Film Festival
