= 11 Flowers =

- Film poster
- Directed by: Wang Xiaoshuai
- Written by: Wang Xiaoshuai; Lao Ni
- Produced by: Wang Xiaoshuai; Isabelle Glachant; Didar Domehri; Ronald Wong
- Starring: Liu Wenqing; Yan Ni; Wang Buqu; Mo Shiyi; Wang Ziyi; Cao Shiping
- Cinematography: Dong Jinsong
- Edited by: Nelly Quettier
- Music by: Marc Perrone
- Production companies: WXS Productions; Chinese Shadows; Full House; Maneki Films; CNC; Playtime; ARTE France Cinéma
- Release dates: September 11, 2011 (Toronto International Film Festival); May 11, 2012 (China)
- Running time: 110 minutes
- Country: China
- Language: Mandarin

11 Flowers (Chinese: 我11; pinyin: wǒ shí yī) is a 2011 drama film directed by Wang Xiaoshuai centered on a boy named Wang Han who loses his white shirt which shows that he is his school's best gymnast. The loss of the shirt is to take on greater metaphorical meaning as the film progresses, which is inspired by the director's own experience as a youth during the Cultural Revolution and Third Front construction and the more general confusion of childhood.

== Cast ==
- Liu Wenqing
- Yan Ni
- Wang Buqu
- Mo Shiyi
- Wang Ziyi
- Cao Shiping
