= The Days (1993 film) =

- Film poster
- Chinese: 冬春的日子
- Literal meaning: days of winter and spring
- Hanyu Pinyin: dōng chūn de rìzǐ
- Directed by: Wang Xiaoshuai
- Written by: Wang Xiaoshuai
- Produced by: Zhang Hongtao; Wang Xiaoshuai
- Starring: Liu Xiaodong; Yu Hong
- Cinematography: Wu Di; Liu Jie
- Edited by: Qingping
- Music by: Liang Heping
- Distributed by: Fortissimo Films
- Release date: 1993
- Running time: 80 minutes
- Country: China
- Language: Mandarin Chinese
- Budget: US$10,000 (approximate)

The Days (Chinese: 冬春的日子; pinyin: Dōng chūn de rìzi; lit. 'Winter and Spring Days') is filmmaker Wang Xiaoshuai's 1993 directorial debut. Filmed in black-and-white, The Days follows the life of Dong (played by actor and artist Liu Xiaodong), and Chun (Yu Hong), married artists who have recently graduated from the Beijing Art Institute. Living meagerly in the hope of making enough money off their works, it soon becomes obvious to everyone but themselves that the marriage has begun to die.

Wang's first film on his own after graduating from the Beijing Film Academy in 1989, The Days was shot on a meager budget of less than $10,000 (U.S.), with filming on the weekends with Wang's friends playing the lead roles.

Made outside of the state film system, The Days was blacklisted upon its release by the Chinese Film Bureau. On the international front, however, the film was seen in a different light. Riding the high that Chinese cinema was enjoying abroad at the time (notably by older directors such as Zhang Yimou and Chen Kaige), Wang Xiaoshuai's small independent film was an early indication that a new movement was beginning to supplant the old one.

== Inspiration ==
Wang has stated that inspiration for The Days came from a variety of sources. One of those was, of course, the harsh reality of his situation. Wang realized that a large-budget film would be impossible and therefore became interested in the small-scale, independent features. Beyond pragmatics, with The Days, Wang Xiaoshuai was consciously rebelling against the films of the period. In particular, the early 1990s was a high point for many "Fifth Generation" directors, whose lavish period films, like Zhang Yimou's Raise the Red Lantern or Chen Kaige's Farewell My Concubine received critical accolades on the international circuit. Wang, however, found them "unnatural and pretentious." As such, he set out to create a film that spoke to the contemporary Chinese generation. As Wang himself has said, "there may not be an obvious story line in The Days, but at least it presents the truth about the lives of people from my generation in the wake of the Tiananmen Square tragedy."

== Production ==
Upon graduation from the Beijing Film Academy in 1989, Wang was initially assigned to the state-run Fujian Film Studio. Rather than beginning his tenure there, Wang decided to stay in Beijing in an effort to create an independent film. This process lasted nearly a year and ultimately collapsed when Wang failed to obtain proper financing. As a result, he began working at Fujian, writing screenplays that would never be made. His tenure at the Fujian Film Studio would be equally brief, however, and by 1992, Wang had returned to Beijing determined to make it on his own.

In the beginning, Wang, along with actor Liu Xiaodong and classmate Zhang Yuan attempted an extremely small-scale production that would eventually collapse. The effort, though a failure, galvanized Wang to begin again with The Days. Due to an extremely low budget, the production would prove to be arduous. The actors and crew, mostly Wang's friends, donated both time and money to the film. Equipment was rented and usually obsolete. Even obtaining film was a trial, as Wang and cinematographer Liu Jie were forced to travel to the manufacturer in Baoding to personally request film stock.

Logistically, the film was also a difficult process as all the actors and crew had normal jobs. As a result, filming could only take place two days a week, on the weekends. Equipment would be rented on Friday and returned on Monday, the process repeating each week.

== Cast ==
- Dong, a young artist played by actual artist Liu Xiaodong. His name is the "Dong" in the Chinese title with a literal meaning of "Winter."
- Chun, Dong's young wife, played by artist Yu Hong. Her name means "Spring." Both Yu and Liu were personal friends of Wang Xiaoshuai.

== Reception ==
The Days was screened at several film festivals notably Rotterdam, and Berlin; it ultimately went on to win the Golden Alexander at the 1995 International Thessaloniki Film Festival and a Best Director award for Wang at the 1995 Taormina Film Festival. The Days was also selected as one of the best 100 films of all time by the BBC in 1995.

Despite its critical successes, The Days had only limited commercial releases, primarily in European markets. Most audiences were able to watch The Days not in theaters, but on television. Not only did the BBC broadcast the film, but many other European television stations as well. As Wang has noticed, most buyers of the film have not been film distributors at all, but television stations.

Like many underground features, however, The Days was never released in the People's Republic of China, either commercially or on television. Indeed, because the film had been screened at several international film festivals without permission, the Film Bureau initially blacklisted Wang from making any new films.
