= Wang Xiaoshuai =

Chinese film director and screenwriter (born 1966)

- 王小帅
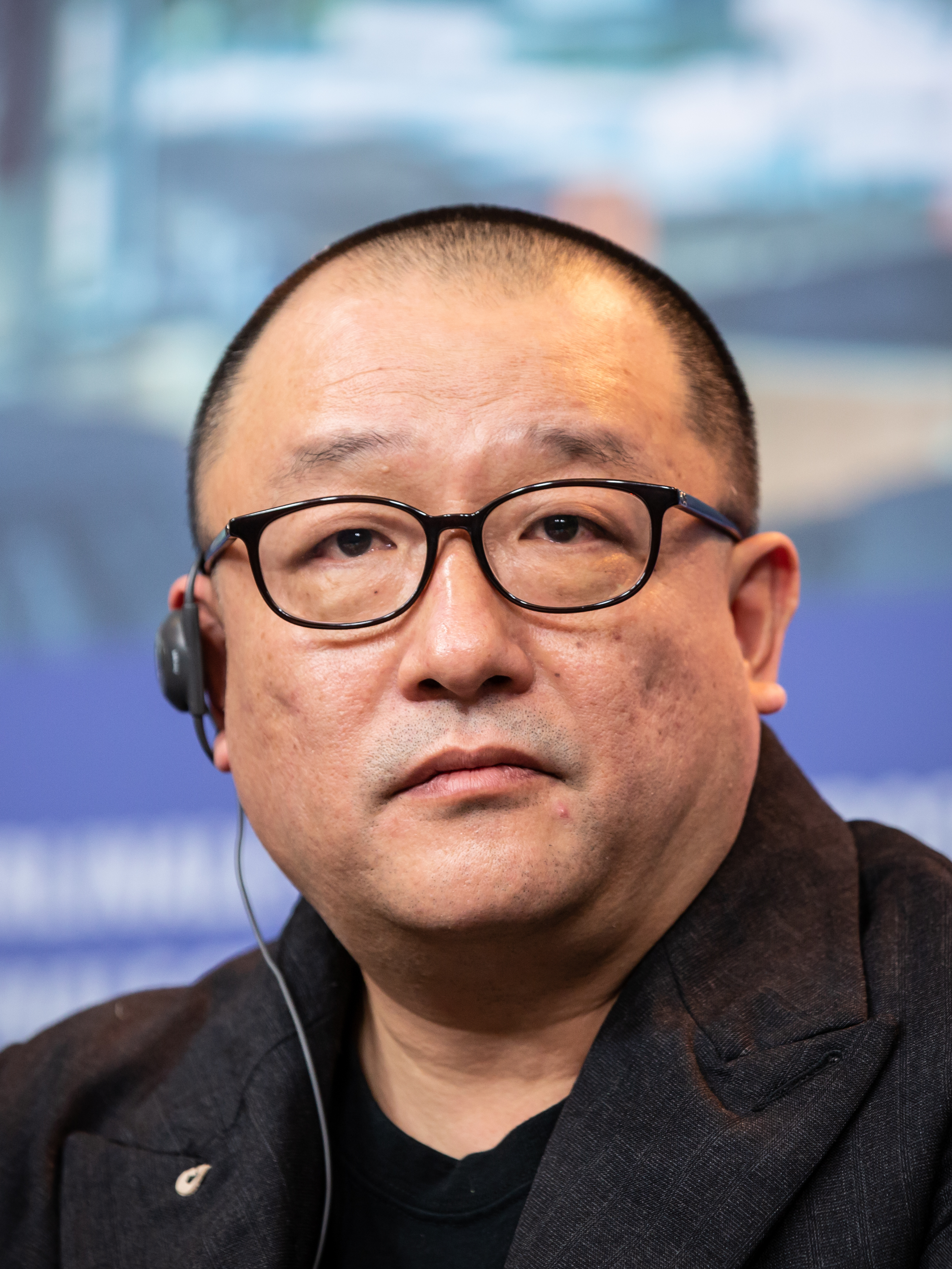
- Wang Xiaoshuai at the Berlinale 2019
- Born: May 22, 1966 (age 60); Shanghai, China
- Education: Beijing Film Academy
- Occupations: Film director, screenwriter, actor, film producer
- Years active: 1993-present
- Movement: Sixth Generation
- Awards: Golden Alexander; 1993 - The Days; Silver Bear - Jury Grand Prix; 2001 - Beijing Bicycle; Jury Prize; 2005 - Shanghai Dreams; Silver Bear for Best Screenplay; 2008 - In Love We Trust

Chinese name
- Traditional Chinese: 王小帥
- Simplified Chinese: 王小帅
Transcriptions
Standard Mandarin
- Hanyu Pinyin: Wáng Xiǎoshuài

Wang Xiaoshuai (Chinese: 王小帅; Chinese: 王小帥; pinyin: Wáng Xiǎoshuài; born May 22, 1966) is a Chinese film director, screenwriter, and occasional actor. He is commonly grouped under the loose association of filmmakers known as the "Sixth Generation" of the Cinema of China. Like others in this generation, and in contrast with earlier Chinese filmmakers who produced mostly historical drama, Wang proposed a “new urban Chinese cinema [that] has been mainly concerned with bearing witness of a fast- paced transforming China and producing a localized critique of globalization.”

Many of Wang's works are known for their sensitive portrayal of teens and youths, most notable in films such as Beijing Bicycle, So Close to Paradise, Drifters, and Shanghai Dreams. His 2008 film In Love We Trust was an exception as it portrays marital strains.

In 2010, Wang was appointed a chevalier of the Ordre des Arts et des Lettres. He also served as a member of the jury of the BigScreen Italia Film Festival 2006, held in Kunming, Yunnan, China.

== Early life ==
Wang Xiaoshuai was born in 1966 in Shanghai but spent the first thirteen years of his life in Guiyang, the capital of Guizhou in southwestern China as a result of upheaval during the Cultural Revolution. While in Guiyang, Wang became interested in and began studying painting. By 1979, he and his family had moved to Wuhan. When he was 15, Wang moved to Beijing where he attended the Central Art Academy Middle School to study painting before eventually studying directing at the Beijing Film Academy.

== Career ==
=== Early works ===
After his graduation from the Beijing Film Academy, Wang spent some time working under the PRC studio system before starting out on his own. His first film, The Days (1993), was an independent feature shot on the weekends in Beijing and starring Wang's friends as two artists. The film did well overseas, where it announced Wang as a major new voice, but it also caught the wrath of the Chinese authorities, who included Wang in its sweeping ban on six filmmakers (including Tian Zhuangzhuang, Zhang Yuan, and He Jianjun) in April 1994. As a result, Wang followed up The Days with another foray into the art world of Beijing using the moniker "Wu Ming" (literally, "no name" or "anonymous"). Entitled Frozen, the film was shot in 1994 but not released until 1997.

After a lengthy period of self-criticism, Wang was finally allowed to start making films again. In contrast to both Frozen and The Days, which both took place in Beijing, Wang's next film, So Close to Paradise (1998), saw him return to his childhood home of Wuhan to film a story of two migrant workers who become involved in a kidnapping. So Close to Paradise also marked the first time Wang operated under the Chinese movie-making authorities, but even then, the film was subject to multiple acts of censorship, and it ultimately received a very limited release in China only after many years had passed.

Wang followed up Paradise with the family comedy The House in 1999. Lost to obscurity, The House was essentially Wang's apology to the Beijing Film Studio for the bureaucratic morass that marked the release of So Close to Paradise. Wang decided to direct a simplistic comedy, one that would be sure to pass the censors with a minimum of fuss.

=== International success ===
Despite the numerous films to his credit at this point, it was not until Beijing Bicycle that Wang rose to truly international success. The winner of the Silver Bear Jury Grand Prix at the Berlin Film Festival, Beijing Bicycle wowed critics with its story of a youth's search for his stolen bicycle, particularly with its shades of Vittorio De Sica's 1948 Bicycle Thieves.

After the success of Beijing Bicycle, Wang made Drifters (2003) which screened at the 2003 Cannes Film Festival in competition for the Prix Un Certain Regard. Shanghai Dreams (2005) was selected for the main Competition and won Cannes's Prix du Jury award.

2008 saw the premiere of Wang's film, In Love We Trust (also known as Left Right) in the Berlin Film Festival, a modern drama about a divorced couple, where it would win a Silver Bear for Best Screenplay. Wang's next project, 11 Flowers recently won the Pusan Promotion Prize for $20,000.

In 2010, Wang was appointed a chevalier of the Ordre des Arts et des Lettres.

== Filmography ==
=== As director ===
Year	English title	Chinese title	Pinyin	Notes
1993	The Days	冬春的日子	Dōng chūn de rì zì	
1997	Frozen	极度寒冷	Jí dù hán lěng	Made under the pseudonym Wu Ming
1998	So Close to Paradise	扁担·姑娘	Biǎn dān, gū niáng	Also known as Ruan's Song
1999	The House	梦幻田园	Mèng huàn tián yuán	Also known as Suburban Dreams or Fantasy Garden
2001	Beijing Bicycle	十七岁的单车	Shí qī suì de dān chē	
2002	The New Year			Part of the Korean anthology film, After War
2003	Drifters	二弟	Èr dì	
2005	Shanghai Dreams	青红	Qīng hóng	
2008	In Love We Trust	左右	Zuǒ yòu	
2010	Chongqing Blues	日照重慶	Rìzhào chóngqìng	
2011	11 Flowers	我十一 (stylized as 我11)	Wǒ shíyī	
2014	Red Amnesia	闖入者	Chuǎngrù zhě	
2018	Chinese Portrait	我的镜头	Wǒ de jìngtóu	
2019	So Long, My Son	地久天长	Dì jiǔ tiān cháng	
2022	The Hotel	旅馆	Lǚguǎn	Premiering at the Toronto International Film Festival in Sept 2022
2024	Above the Dust	沃土	Wòtǔ	Premiering at the 74th Berlin International Film Festival in February 2024

=== As actor ===
Year	Title	Director	Role
1994	Weekend Lover	Lou Ye	Zhang Chi
1998	The Red Violin	François Girard	Junior policeman
2004	The World	Jia Zhangke	
2006	Karmic Mahjong	Wang Guangli	

=== As producer ===
Year	Title	Director
2017	Old Beast	Zhou Ziyang
