= Prostitution in China =

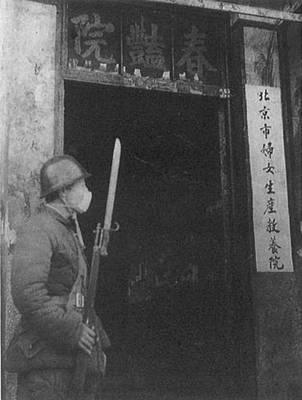
A prostitution "reeducation center" at a former brothel in Beijing, 1949

Prostitution by legal status in Asia Legalization – legal and regulated Abolitionism – legal and not regulated; organized activities such as brothels and pimping illegal Prohibitionism – illegal Varies with local laws

Officially, prostitution is illegal in mainland China. The government of China has vacillated, however, in its legal treatment of prostitutes, treating them sometimes as criminals and sometimes as behaving with misconduct. Since the reemergence of prostitution in the 1980s, government authorities have responded by first using the legal system, that is, the daily operations of courts and police. Second, they have relied on police-led campaigns, clearly delineated periods of intense public activity, as a form of social discipline. Despite lobbying by international non-governmental organizations (NGOs) and overseas commentators, there is not much support for legalisation of the sex sector by the public, social organizations or the government of the People's Republic of China (PRC).

Prostitution and related activities in mainland China appear in diverse forms, at various venues and prices, and with prostitutes coming from a range of social backgrounds. They are almost all female, though in recent years male prostitutes have also emerged. Venues include hotels, massage parlors, karaoke bars and beauty salons.

While the sale of sexual intercourse remains illegal throughout mainland China, as of 2013 erotic massage, more commonly known as massage with "happy endings", is legal in the city of Foshan in Guangdong province. In June of that year, the Foshan Court determined that the sale of erotic massage is not the same as prostitution.

After taking power in 1949, the Chinese Communist Party (CCP) embarked upon a series of campaigns with the aim of eradicating prostitution from mainland China by the early 1960s. Since the loosening of government controls over society in the early 1980s, prostitution in mainland China not only has become more visible, but can now be found throughout both urban and rural areas. In spite of government efforts, prostitution has now developed to the extent that it comprises an industry, one that involves a great number of people and produces a considerable economic output. Prostitution has also become associated with a number of issues, including organized crime, government corruption, hypocrisy, as well as sexually transmitted diseases. Notably, a CCP official who was a major provincial campaigner against corruption was removed from his post and expelled from the party after he was caught in a hotel room with a prostitute in 2007.

== History ==
=== Maoist era ===
Following the proclamation of the People's Republic of China in 1949, local government authorities were charged with the task of eliminating prostitution. One month after the Communist takeover of Beijing on 3 February 1949, the new municipal government under Ye Jianying announced a policy to control the city's many brothels. On 21 November, all 224 of Beijing's establishments were shut down; 1286 prostitutes and 434 owners, procurers, and pimps were arrested in the space of 12 hours by an estimated 2400 cadres.

Due to the enormity of social issues that had to be addressed, and the limited budgets and human resources of local governments, most cities adopted the slower approach of first controlling and then prohibiting brothel-prostitution. This method was used in Tianjin, Shanghai and Wuhan. Typically it involved a system of governmental administration which controlled brothel activities and discouraged male patrons. The combined effect of such measures was to gradually reduce the number of brothels in each city until the point where a "Beijing-style" closure of the remaining brothels was deemed feasible and reeducation could begin. The number of sex workers in Shanghai had grown to 100,000 following the Second Sino-Japanese War, and it was here that reeducation programs were undertaken on the largest scale.

By the early 1960s, such measures had basically wiped out visible forms of prostitution from mainland China. According to the People's Republic of China (PRC) government, venereal diseases were almost eliminated from the mainland contemporaneously with the control of prostitution. To mark this victory, all 29 venereal disease research institutes were closed in 1964.

In accordance with Marxist theory, women who sold sex were viewed as being forced into prostitution in order to survive. The eradication of prostitution was thus vaunted as one of the major accomplishments of the Communist government and evidence of the primacy of Chinese Marxism. Prostitution did not exist as a serious object of concern in China for a period of nearly three decades. Recent studies have demonstrated, however, that the disappearance of prostitution under the Maoist government was far from complete. Pan Suiming, one of China's leading experts on prostitution, argues that "invisible" prostitution — in the form of women providing sexual services to cadres in exchange for certain privileges — became a distinctive feature of Maoist China, particularly towards the end of the Cultural Revolution.

=== Post-1978 ===
Prostitution-related arrests during police campaigns (1983–1999)
year	prostitution-related arrests
1983	46,534
1989–90	243,183
1996–7	approx. 250,000
1998	189,972
1999	216,660

The resurgence of prostitution in mainland China has coincided with the introduction of Deng Xiaoping's reform and opening up in 1978. According to the incomplete statistics composed on the basis of nationwide crackdowns, the rate of prostitution in China has been rising every year since 1982. Between 1989 and 1990, 243,183 people were apprehended for prostitution-related activities. Zhang Ping estimates that such police figures only account for around 25–30 percent of the total number of people who are actually involved. Prostitution is an increasingly large part of the Chinese economy, employing perhaps 10 million people, with an annual level of consumption of possibly 1 trillion RMB. Following a 2000 police campaign, Chinese economist Yang Fan estimated that the Chinese GDP slumped by 1%, as a result of decreased spending by newly unemployed female prostitutes.

The revival of prostitution was initially associated with China's eastern, coastal cities, but since the early 1990s at least, local media have reported on prostitution scandals in the economic hinterlands, incorporating such remote and underdeveloped regions as Yunnan, Guizhou, and Tibet. In the 1980s, the typical seller of sex was a poorly educated, young female rural migrant from populous, relatively remote provinces such as Sichuan and Hunan. Over the past decade, there has been a recognition that the majority of women who enter prostitution do so of their own accord. The potential benefits of prostitution as an alternative form of employment include greater disposable income, access to upwardly mobile social circles and lifestyle options. The state-controlled media have focused attention on urban residents engaging in prostitution, especially university-educated women. There also seems to be a growing acceptance of prostitution. In a 1997 study, 46.8% of undergraduates in Beijing admitted to having considered receiving prostitution services. On the demand side, prostitution has been associated with the gender imbalances brought about by the one-child policy.

Prostitution is often directly linked to low-level government corruption. Many local officials believe that encouraging prostitution in recreational business operations will bring economic benefits by developing the tourism and hospitality industries and generating a significant source of tax revenue. On occasion, police have been implicated in the running of high grade hotels where prostitution activities occur, or accepting bribes and demanding sexual favours to ignore the existence of prostitution activities. Government corruption is also involved in a more indirect form — the widespread abuse of public funds to finance consumption of sex services. Pan Suiming contends that China has a specific type of prostitution that entails a bargain between those who use their power and authority in government to obtain sex and those who use sex to obtain privileges.

Apart from violent incidents directly associated with prostitution, an increasing number of women who sell sex have been physically assaulted, and even murdered, in the course of attempts to steal their money and property. There have also been a growing number of criminal acts, especially instances of theft and fraud directed at men who buy sex, as well as bribery of public servants. Offenders often capitalise on the unwillingness of participants in the prostitution transaction to report such activities. Organised crime rings are increasingly trafficking women into and out of China for the sex trade, sometimes forcibly and after multiple acts of rape. Mainland China also has a growing number of "heroin hookers", whose drug addictions are often connected to international and domestic crime rackets.

Sexually transmitted diseases also made a resurgence around the same time as prostitution, and have been directly linked to prostitution. Some regions have introduced a policy of 100% condom use, inspired by a similar measure in Thailand. Other interventions have been introduced recently at some sites, including STI services, peer education and voluntary counselling and testing for HIV.

Chinese women are sometimes required to submit a nude photo along with personally identifiable contact information as collateral when receiving a loan through gray-market lenders. If they fall behind in their payments, the photos together with the contact information are sold online to potential customers of prostitution or human traffickers.

In 2003 a report by Chen Jieren on university prostitution in China has sparked a country-wide debate about the issue, which has also been described as a "well-kept secret".

== Foreign prostitutes ==
=== African ===
Uganda's Director of Interpol Asan Kasingye estimates that thousands of women from Kenya, Rwanda or Uganda were trafficked in 2011 to work as prostitutes in China, Indonesia and Malaysia.

=== European ===
During the 19th century and in contemporary times, Portuguese prostitutes have operated in Macau. Some Chinese triad members from Macau married Portuguese prostitutes before China took it back from Portugal, providing them with access to Portuguese citizenship. By 1930, there were about 8000 White Russian prostitutes in Shanghai. Today, Eastern Europeans and Russians make up most of the white prostitutes in China. Bars in major Chinese cities offer blonde, blue-eyed Russian "hostesses". Many European prostitutes in China market themselves as escorts to attract the attention of visiting businessmen and richer Chinese clients. They may work independently or through an escort agency and advertise their services through the internet. In Shanghai, many Russian women work as prostitutes.

=== Japanese ===
During the mid-2010s it was reported that Japanese pornographic actresses were working in Macau as prostitutes for rich clients.

=== North Korean ===
The North Korean government system of harsh punishment through forced labor camps or the death penalty can fuel trafficking in neighboring China. Many of the estimated 10,000 North Korean women and girls who have migrated illegally to China to flee abuse and human rights violations are particularly vulnerable to trafficking. According to a source from 2005, "60 to 70 percent of North Korean defectors in the People's Republic of China are women, 70 to 80 percent of whom are victims of human trafficking."

Traffickers reportedly lure, drug, detain, or kidnap some North Korean women upon their arrival. The women are then moved to cities farther away to subjected to forced prostitution in brothels or through internet sex sites, or compelled service as hostesses in nightclubs or karaoke bars. Others offer jobs but subsequently force the women into prostitution.

North Korean victims of sex trafficking in China have been subjected to penetrative vaginal and anal rape, groping, and forced masturbation in illegal 'online rape dens' used for digital and live pornographic video sharing in the twenty-first century.

When Chinese authorities arrest these North Korean trafficking victims, they repatriate them. North Korean authorities keep such repatriates in penal labour colonies, execute any Chinese-fathered babies of theirs "to protect North Korean pure blood" and force abortions on all pregnant repatriates not executed.

=== South Korean ===
A ring of South Korean prostitutes, composed of 21 Korean women ranging in age from 24 to 37, serving Chinese men was busted in Macau in 2015.

Some Korean women wear kiminos while working as prostitutes in Macau.

=== Mongolian ===
Some Mongolian women work as prostitutes in bars in Beijing.

=== Pakistani ===
There are reports that Pakistani women have been trafficked to China and forced into prostitution. Hundreds of Pakistani women have allegedly been "sold" by poor families to marry Chinese men. It is said that the majority have subsequently been handed over by their husbands to paying Chinese men to be raped in China. Others have been made to work in bars and clubs which is considered unacceptable in Pakistan's conservative Islamic society.

The gender gap in China, resulting from the country's one-child policy, has led to a shortage of women of marriageable age. With improved relations between China and Pakistan, more Pakistani women have begun marrying Chinese men, mainly as a result of poverty in Pakistan.

The majority of the women involved are from Christian families as these make up the poorest communities in Pakistan. The process is facilitated by marriage brokers who are able to charge far higher fees than the amount of money given to families of the women.

China's foreign ministry has dismissed the list of sold girls. Pakistani officials have been accused of trying to suppress information to avoid jeopardizing China-Pakistan relations. Omar Warriach, Amnesty International's South Asia director has criticised administrations of both countries for allowing large scale mistreatment of Pakistani women without expressing any concern. He has urged Pakistan not to tolerate human right violations of its own citizens just to protect its relationship with China.

=== Vietnamese ===
China is a recipient of Vietnamese prostitutes.

Many Vietnamese women travel from Lao Cai in Vietnam to Hekou County in China to work in brothels. They provide sex mainly to Chinese men.

Vietnamese women working as prostitutes in China have been trafficked from Vietnam through various means at the Guangxi border. Ha Giang province is a conduit for women being trafficked to become prostitutes in China. Chinese police sent 11 Vietnamese prostitutes working in Guangxi back to Vietnam in 2012.

On the Chinese border with Vietnam, in the Chinese town of Po-chai, a "Vietnamese girl market" made out of Vietnamese prostitutes offers sex to Chinese men exclusively and refuses service to Vietnamese men.

== Hong Kong and Macau ==
Hong Kong and Macau are special administrative regions of China and subject to different laws: prostitution in Hong Kong is legal, as is prostitution in Macau. This has led to a higher incidence of prostitution in these regions than in mainland China. Women travel from mainland China to Hong Kong and Macau in order to engage in the trade. There are also allegations of women being trafficked for the purpose. The trafficked women are said to come from mainland China, Mongolia, Southeast Asia, Europe, and South Africa.

=== Tanka prostitution ===
Elizabeth Wheeler Andrew (1845–1917) and Katharine Caroline Bushnell (5 February 1856 January 26, 1946), who wrote extensively on the position of women in the British Empire, wrote about the Tanka inhabitants of Hong Kong and their position in the prostitution industry, catering towards foreign sailors. The Tanka did not marry with the Chinese, being descendants of the natives, they were restricted to the waterways. They supplied their women as prostitutes to British sailors and assisted the British in their military actions around Hong Kong. The Tanka in Hong Kong were considered "outcasts" categorized low class.

Ordinary Chinese prostitutes were afraid of serving Westerners since they looked strange to them, while the Tanka prostitutes freely mingled with western men. The Tanka assisted the Europeans with supplies and providing them with prostitutes. Low class European men in Hong Kong easily formed relations with the Tanka prostitutes. The profession of prostitution among the Tanka women led to them being hated by the Chinese both because they had sex with westerners and them being racially Tanka.

The Tanka prostitutes were considered to be "low class", greedy for money, arrogant, and treating clients with a bad attitude, they were known for punching their clients or mocking them by calling them names. Though the Tanka prostitutes were considered low class, their brothels were still remarkably well kept and tidy. A famous fictional story which was written in the 1800s depicted western items decorating the rooms of Tanka prostitutes.

The stereotype among most Chinese in Canton that all Tanka women were prostitutes was common, leading the government during the Republican era to accidentally inflate the number of prostitutes when counting, due to all Tanka women being included. The Tanka women were viewed as such that their prostitution activities were considered part of the normal bustle of a commercial trading city. Sometimes the lowly regarded Tanka prostitutes managed to elevate themselves into higher forms of prostitution.

Tanka women were ostracized from the Cantonese community, and were nicknamed "salt water girls " (ham shui mui in Cantonese) for their services as prostitutes to foreigners in Hong Kong.

Tanka women who worked as prostitutes for foreigners also commonly kept a "nursery" Tanka girls specifically for exporting them for prostitution work to overseas Chinese communities such as in Australia or America, or to serve as a Chinese or foreigner's concubine.

A report called "Correspondence respecting the alleged existence of Chinese slavery in Hong Kong: presented to both Houses of Parliament by Command of Her Majesty" was presented to the English Parliament in 1882 concerning the existence of slavery in Hong Kong, of which many were Tanka girls serving as prostitutes or mistresses to westerners.

== Xinjiang ==
The Manchu traveller Qi-yi-shi reported the presence of prostitution among Torghut and Khoshut women in the Karasahr area of Xinjiang in 1777. He also wrote of the prevalence of prostitution in Kashgar and reported that some Manchu soldiers and officials in Xinjiang had long-term relationships with Turkistani prostitutes. The presence of local Turki (Uyghur) prostitutes at a party held by Russian officials in Kashgar in 1900 led to anti-Russian street demonstrations.

In late-19th- and early-20th-century Turpan, Islamic modesty meant that Muslim prostitutes would not bare their bodies to clients in the way that Chinese prostitutes did. The only women in Xinjiang at that time not to wear headscarfs were prostitutes from the poorest social classes. In the early 20th century the Scottish missionary George W. Hunter noted that the poverty of the Turki Muslims (Uyghurs) resulted in them selling their daughters, and that the practice led to Xinjiang containing significant numbers of Turki prostitutes. In contrast, he observed very little prostitution among the Tungan Muslims (Hui people). During the same period the Finnish military officer Gustaf Mannerheim reported that several streets in Hotan were occupied by Uyghur prostitutes who specialised in selling their services to travelling merchants. Records from Turpan indicate that the customers of Turki prostitutes in Xinjiang included merchants from China proper.

=== Temporary marriage ===
Temporary marriage, in the form of the Sunni Muslim misyar marriage ("traveller's marriage") contract, is a practice that has sometimes been used as a cover for a form of prostitution. It was widespread in Xinjiang under Chinese rule prior to the Dungan Revolt of 1862–77, and some westerners considered its use there to be a form of licensed prostitution. It allowed a man to marry a woman for a week or even a couple of days, with "the mulla who performs the ceremony arranging for the divorce at the same time". In some cases a temporary marriage was undertaken without the traditional marriage contract and could be easily terminated by the man involved. Such a marriage was forbidden by the Koran, and the Turki (Uyghur) Muslims in Xinjiang called it a "marriage of convenience".

After the restoration of Chinese rule in the late 19th century it was common for Chinese soldiers and civilians in the Yarkand area of Xinjiang, including high officials, to take temporary wives, often without a marriage ceremony. Most of the wives came from Khotan. When the Chinese returned to China proper, their wives were abandoned or sold to friends. The Russian exile Paul Nazaroff reported the existence of a temporary marriage bazaar in Yangi Hissar in the 1920s.

The frequent marriages of Chinese men to Muslim Turki women in Xinjiang from 1880 to 1949 occurred despite the fact that Islamic law forbids Muslim women from marrying non-Muslims, and that the Turki community considered such women to be prostitutes. Some foreign commentators suggested that the women involved were motivated by poverty, as such marriages prevented the women from being subject to the tax on prostitution.

== Types and venues ==
Chinese police categorise prostitution practices according to a descending hierarchy of seven tiers, though this typology does not exhaust the forms of practices that exist. These tiers highlight the heterogeneous nature of prostitution and prostitutes. While they are all classified as prostitutes, the services they offer can be very different. Within some tiers, for example, there is still some revulsion to the acts of anal sex and oral sex. In parallel with the wide range of backgrounds for prostitutes, male buyers of sex also come from a wide range of occupational backgrounds. According to the local police, in China there are seven categories of prostitutes:

First tier - baoernai (包二奶)
Women who act as the "second wives" of men with money and influential positions, including government officials and entrepreneurs from the mainland, as well as overseas businessmen. This practice is defined as prostitution on the grounds that women in question actively solicit men who can provide them with fixed-term accommodation and a regular allowance. Women who engage in these acts will sometimes co-habit with their "clients" and may even have ambitions to become a real wife. Illegal online "College Concubine Agencies" have appeared, charging a fee to put men in contact with female university students who wish to become mistresses.

Second tier - baopo (包婆 "packaged wife")
Women who accompany high class clients for a fixed duration of time, for example, during the course of a business trip, and receive a set payment for doing so.

The first and second tiers have become the focus of heated public debate because they are explicitly linked to government corruption. Many domestic commentators contend that these practices constitute a concrete expression of "bourgeois rights". The All-China Women's Federation, as one of the major vehicles of feminism in the PRC, as well as women's groups in Hong Kong and Taiwan, have been actively involved in efforts to eradicate this form of "concubinage" as practices that violate the emotional and economic surety of the marriage contract.

Third tier - santing (三厅 "three halls")

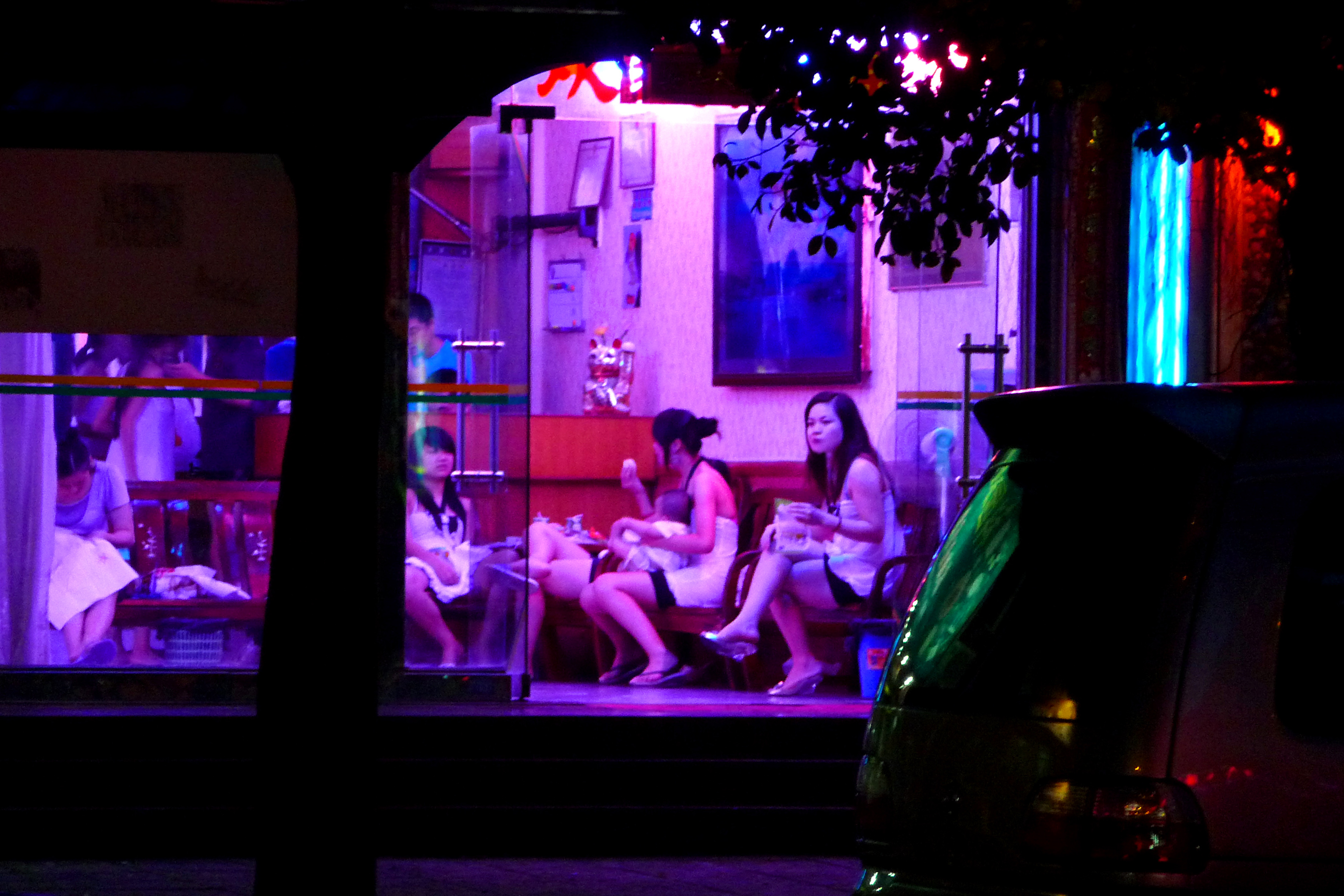
A hair salon where prostitutes work in Bao'an District, Shenzhen. Brothels are often disguised as hair salons, or they operate out of working hair salons.

Women who perform sexual acts with men in karaoke/dance venues, bars, restaurants, teahouses and other venues and who receive financial recompense in the form of tips from the individual men they accompany, as well as from a share of the profits generated by informal service charges on the use of facilities and the consumption of food and beverages. A common euphemism for such hostesses is sanpei xiaojie (三陪小姐: "ladies of the three accompaniments"). In theory, the "three accompaniments" are chatting, drinking and dancing with their clients. In practice, the "three accompaniments" more often refers to dancing with, drinking with, and being publicly groped by their clients. These women often begin by allowing their clients to fondle or intimately caress their bodies, then if the client is eager, will engage in sexual intercourse.

Fourth tier - "doorbell girls" (叮咚小姐 "dingdong ladies")
Women who solicit potential buyers of sex by phoning rooms in a given hotel.

Fifth tier - falangmei (发廊妹 "hairdressing salon sisters")
Women who work in places that offer commercial sexual services under the guise of massage or health and beauty treatments; for instance, in health and fitness centres, beauty parlours, barber shops, bathhouses and saunas. Common activities in these premises are masturbation or oral sex.

Sixth tier - jienü (街女 "street girls")
Women who solicit male buyers of sex on the streets.

Seventh tier - xiagongpeng (下工棚 "down the work shack")
Women who sell sex to the transient labour force of male workers from the rural countryside.

The lowest two tiers are characterised by a more straightforward exchange of sex for financial or material recompense. They are neither explicitly linked to government corruption, nor directly mediated through China's new commercial recreational business sector. Women who sell sex in the lowest two tiers usually do so in return for small sums of money, food and shelter.

== Legal responses ==
The PRC rejects the argument that prostitution is an unremarkable transaction between consenting individuals and that prohibition laws constitute a violation of civil liberties. Overall, the PRC's legal response to prostitution is to penalise third party organisers of prostitution. Participants in the prostitution transaction are still usually penalised according to the Chinese system of administrative sanctions, rather than through the criminal code.

=== Law ===
Until the 1980s, the subject of prostitution was not viewed as a major concern for the National People's Congress. The PRC's first criminal code, the Criminal Law and the Criminal Procedure Law of 1979 made no explicit reference to the activities of prostitutes and prostitute clients. Legal control of prostitution was effected on the basis of provincial rulings and localised policing initiatives until the introduction of the "Security administration punishment regulations" in 1987. The Regulations makes it an offence to "sell sex" (卖淫) and to "have illicit relations with a prostitute" (嫖宿暗娼).

Prostitution only became a distinct object of statutory classification in the early 1990s. Responding to requests from the Ministry of Public Security and the All-China Women's Federation, the National People's Congress passed legislation that significantly expanded the range and scope of prostitution controls: the 1991 Decision on Strictly Forbidding the Selling and Buying of Sex and the 1991 Decision on the Severe Punishment of Criminals Who Abduct and Traffic in or Kidnap Women and Children. Adding symbolic weight to these enhanced law enforcement controls was the 1992 Law on Protecting the Rights and Interests of Women, which defines prostitution as a social practice that abrogates the inherent rights of women to personhood.

The PRC's revised Criminal Law of 1997 retains its abolitionist focus in that it is primarily concerned with criminalising third-party involvement in prostitution. For the first time the death penalty may be used, but only in exceptional cases of organising prostitution activities, involving additional circumstances such as repeated offences, rape, causing serious bodily injury, etc. The activities of first-party participants continue to be regulated in practice according to administrative law, with the exceptions of anyone who sells or buys prostitutional sex in the full knowledge that they are infected with an STD; and anyone who has prostitutional sex with a child under 14 years of age. Since 2003, male homosexual prostitution has also been prosecuted under the law.

The 1997 criminal code codified provisions in the 1991 Decision, establishing a system of controls over social place, specifically places of leisure and entertainment. The ultimate goal is to stop managers and workers within the predominantly male-run and male-patronised hospitality and service industry from profiting from and/or encouraging the prostitution of others. Government intervention in commercial recreation has found concrete expression in the form of the 1999 "Regulations concerning the management of public places of entertainment". The provisions proscribe a range of commercial practices that characterise the activities of female "hostesses". These laws have been further reinforced via the introduction of localised licensing measures that bear directly on the interior spatial organisation of recreational venues.

=== Party disciplinary measures ===
As a result of strong calls to curb official corruption, during the mid to late 1990s, a whole host of regulations were also introduced to ban government employees both from running recreational venues and from protecting illegal business operations. The 1997 Communist Party Discipline Regulations, for example, contain specific provisions to the effect that party members will be stripped of their posts for using their position and/or public funds to keep a "second wife", a "hired wife", and to buy sexual services. These measures are being policed via the practice established in 1998 of auditing government officials, and thereby combining the forces of the CPC's disciplinary committees with those of the State Auditing Administration. Following the introduction of these measures, the Chinese media has publicised numerous cases of government officials being convicted and disciplined for abusing their positions for prostitution.

== Policing ==
Despite the position of the law, prostitutes are often treated as quasi-criminals by the Ministry of Public Security. Chinese police conduct regular patrols of public spaces, often with the support of mass-line organisations, using a strong presence as a deterrence against prostitution. Because lower tier prostitutes work the streets, they are more likely to be apprehended. Arrests are also more likely to be female sellers of sex than male buyers of sex. The overwhelming majority of men and women who are apprehended are released with a caution and fine.

In response, sellers and buyers of sex have adopted a wide range of tactics designed to avoid apprehension. The spatial mobility which is afforded by modern communications systems, such as mobile phones and pagers, and by modern forms of transportation, such as taxis and private cars, has severely reduced the ability of police to determine exactly who is engaged in acts of solicitation. Prostitutes have also begun using the internet, in particular instant messaging software such as QQ, to attract customers. In 2004, PlayChina, an online prostitution referral service, was shut down by police.

In tandem with the long-term task of developing preventative policing, the much more visible form of policing have been periodic police-led campaigns. Anti-prostitution campaigns have been accompanied by nationwide "media blitzes" to publicise the PRC's laws and regulations. This is typically followed by the announcement of arrest statistics, and then by sober official statements suggesting that the struggle to eliminate prostitution will be a long one. The use of campaigns has been criticised for their reliance on an outdated "ideological" construction and an equally outmoded campaign formula of the 1950s.

The primary target of the PRC's prostitution controls throughout the 1990s has been China's burgeoning hospitality and entertainment industry. These culminated in the "strike hard" campaigns of late 1999 and 2000. Whilst such campaigns may have failed to eradicate prostitution in toto, there is some evidence that regulation of China's recreational venues has helped to create a legitimate female service worker with the right to refuse to engage in practices repugnant to the "valid labour contract", as well as the right to be free from sexual harassment in the workplace.

Chinese police have, however, proven unable to effectively police higher tier prostitution practices. The nature of concubinage and second wife practices makes it more suited as a target of social action campaigns rather than conventional police action. Because of social changes, for example, Chinese police are now professionally constrained not to intrude on people's personal relationships in an overt or coercive manner. Police forces around China also differ as to how they approach the subject. In some areas, "massage parlours" on main streets are known full well to be brothels, but are generally left to function without hindrance, barring occasional raids.

== The question of legalisation ==
The illegal activities and problems associated with prostitution had led some to believe that there would be benefits if prostitution was legalized.

A number of international NGOs and human rights organisations have criticised the PRC government for failing to comply with the UN Convention on the Elimination of All Forms of Discrimination Against Women, accusing PRC of penalising and abusing lower tier prostitutes, many of whom are victims of human trafficking, while exonerating men who buy sex, and ignoring the ongoing problems of governmental complicity and involvement in the sex trade industry. The Convention on the Elimination of All Forms of Discrimination Against Women reads: Art. 6: States Parties shall take all appropriate measures, including legislation, to suppress all forms of traffic in women and exploitation of prostitution of women. However, it does not advocate a system of legal and regulated prostitution. There has, though, been some calls for legalization; a minor rally for this cause was held in 2010 organized by sex worker activist Ye Haiyan, who was arrested by police for her role in organizing the protests.

Central guidelines laid down by the CPC do not permit the public advocacy of the legalisation of prostitution. Arguments concerning legalisation are not absent, however, from mainland China. On the contrary, some commentators contend that legally recognising the sex industry, in conjunction with further economic development, will ultimately reduce the number of women in prostitution. Domestic commentators have also been highly critical of the PRC's prostitution controls, with a consistent Marxist-informed focus of complaint being the gender-biased and discriminatory nature of such controls, as well as human rights abuses. Some commentators in China and overseas contend that the PRC's policy of banning prostitution is problematic because it hinders the task of developing measures to prevent the spread of HIV.

While prostitution controls have been relaxed at a local level, there is no impetus for legalisation at the central government level. Importantly, legalisation does not have much public support. Given the underdeveloped nature of the Chinese economy and legal system, there is an argument that legalisation would further complicate the already difficult task of establishing the legal responsibility for third-party involvement in forced prostitution and the traffic in women. Surveys conducted in China suggest that clandestine forms of prostitution will continue to proliferate alongside the establishment of legal prostitution businesses, because of social sanctions against working or patronising a red-light district. Problems associated with female employment also limit the effectiveness of legalisation. These include the lack of independent trade unions, and limited access of individuals to civil redress with regard to occupational health and safety issues.

== HIV/AIDS ==
According to UNAIDS, 0.5% of Chinese sex workers are infected with HIV. One study reported that 5% of low-cost sex workers were infected. In one part of Yunnan province, the infection rate is estimated to be as high as 7%. The Chinese government has initiated programs to educate sex workers in HIV/AIDS prevention.

Rising HIV/AIDS rates among Chinese's elderly has been partially attributed to the use of sex workers.

== In the media ==
The spread of prostitution practices has introduced a large quantity of slang to the popular vocabulary. Prostitution is a popular subject in the media, especially on the internet. Typically news of police raids, court cases or family tragedies related to prostitution are published in a sensationalised form. A good example is news of an orgy between 400 Japanese clients and 500 Chinese prostitutes in 2003, which, partially because of anti-Japanese sentiment, was widely publicised and met with considerable outrage. Another highly publicised case was that of Alex Ho Wai-to, then a Democratic Party candidate for the Legislative Council of Hong Kong, who was given a six-month re-education through labor sentence for hiring a prostitute.

Prostitution has emerged as a subject of art in recent years, particularly in Chinese cinema. Li Shaohong's 1995 film Blush begins in 1949 with the rounding up of prostitutes in Shanghai for "reeducation", and proceeds to tell the story of a love triangle between two prostitutes and one of their former clients. One of the prostitutes, Xiaoe, attempts to hang herself in reeducation. When asked to explain the reason, she says she was born in the brothel and enjoyed her lifestyle there - thereby challenging the government-sanctioned perspective of prostitution. The 1998 film Xiu Xiu: The Sent Down Girl was a dramatic portrayal of "invisible" prostitution in the rural China during the Maoist era.

The 2001 independent film Seafood, by Zhu Wen, was an even more frank depiction of prostitution, this time of the complicated relationship between prostitution and law enforcement. In the film, a Beijing prostitute goes to a seaside resort to commit suicide. Her attempt is intervened by a police officer who tries to redeem her, but also inflicts upon her many instances of sexual assault. Both films, whilst being critically acclaimed abroad, performed poorly in mainland China, only partially due to government restrictions on distribution. The depiction of prostitution in fiction, by comparison, has fared slightly better. The most notable author on the subject is the young writer Jiu Dan, whose portrayal of Chinese prostitutes in Singapore in her novel Wuya, was extremely controversial.

== Sex trafficking ==
China is a source, destination, and transit country for women and children subjected to sex trafficking. Chinese women and girls are subjected to sex trafficking within China. Traffickers typically recruit them from rural areas and take them to urban centers, using a combination of fraudulent job offers and coercion by imposing large travel fees, confiscating passports, confining victims, or physically and financially threatening victims to compel their engagement in commercial sex. Well-organized criminal syndicates and local gangs play key roles in the trafficking of Chinese women and girls in China, recruiting victims with fraudulent employment opportunities and subsequently forcing them into commercial sex. Illicit brokers increasingly facilitate the forced and fraudulent marriage of South Asian, Southeast Asian, and African women and girls to Chinese men for fees of up $30,000. The men—sometimes in partnership with their parents—often incur large debts to cover these fees, which they attempt to recover by subjecting the "brides" to prostitution. Some Chinese men are reportedly circumventing this brokerage system by traveling to Southeast Asian capitals and entering into legal marriages with local women and girls, then returning to China and subjecting them to forced prostitution.

Chinese men, women, and children are subjected to forced labor and sex trafficking in at least 57 other countries. Chinese women and girls are subjected to sexual exploitation throughout the world, including in major cities, construction sites, remote mining and logging camps, and areas with high concentrations of Chinese migrant workers.

Women and children from neighboring Asian countries, Africa, and the Americas are subjected to sex trafficking in China. A large number of North Korean women are subjected to forced prostitution. Women and girls are kidnapped or recruited through marriage brokers and transported to China, where some are subjected to commercial sex.

The United States Department of State Office to Monitor and Combat Trafficking in Persons ranks China as a 'Tier 3' country.

== See also ==
- Crime in the People's Republic of China
- Corruption in China
- Sex trafficking in China

== Sources ==
- Andrew, Elizabeth Wheeler; Bushnell, Katharine Caroline (2006), Heathen Slaves and Christian Rulers, Echo Library, ISBN 9781406804317
- Bellér-Hann, Ildikó (2008), Community Matters in Xinjiang, 1880-1949: Towards a Historical Anthropology of the Uyghur, BRILL, ISBN 978-9004166752
- Carroll, John M. (2013), A Concise History of Hong Kong, Rowman & Littlefield Publishers, ISBN 9781299762022
- Cheung, Fanny M. (1997), EnGendering Hong Kong Society: A Gender Perspective of Women's Status, Chinese University Press, ISBN 9789622017368
- Ditmore, Melissa Hope (2006), Encyclopedia of Prostitution and Sex Work, Greenwood Publishing Group, ISBN 9780313329685
- Dunnell, Ruth W.; Millward, James A.; Elliott, Mark C.; Foret, Philippe (2004), New Qing Imperial History: The Making of Inner Asian Empire at Qing Chengde, Taylor & Francis Group, ISBN 9780415511186
- Friederich, Michael (1994), Bamberger Zentralasienstudien, Schwarz, ISBN 9783879972357
- Jaschok, Maria; Miers, Suzanne (1994), Women and Chinese Patriarchy: Submission, Servitude and Escape, Zed Books, ISBN 9781856491266
- Jeffreys, Elaine (2004), China, Sex and Prostitution, Routledge, ISBN 9780415646567
- Kamal, Ahmad (2000), Land Without Laughter, iUniverse, ISBN 9780595010059
- Hitchcock, Michael (2009), Tourism in Southeast Asia: Challenges and New Directions, NIAS Press, ISBN 9788776940348
- Ho, Virgil K. Y. (2005), Understanding Canton: Rethinking Popular Culture in the Republican Period, Oxford University Press, ISBN 9780199282715
- Hodge, Peter (1980), Community Problems and Social Work in Southeast Asia: The Hong Kong and Singapore Experience, Hong Kong University Press, ISBN 9789622090224
- Le Sueur, James D., ed. (2003), The Decolonization Reader, Psychology Press, ISBN 9780415231176
- Lethbridge, Henry J. (1978), Hong Kong, stability and change: a collection of essays, Oxford University Press, ISBN 9780195804027
- Millward, James (1998), Beyond the Pass: Economy, Ethnicity, and Empire in Qing Central Asia, 1759-1864, Stanford University Press, ISBN 9780804729338
- Nightingale, Pamela; Skrine, C. P. (2013), Macartney at Kashgar: New Light on British, Chinese and Russian Activities in Sinkiang, 1890-1918, Routledge, ISBN 9781136576096
- Rowan, Roy (2008), Chasing the Dragon: A Veteran Journalist's Firsthand Account of the 1946-9 Chinese Revolution, Rowman & Littlefield, ISBN 9781599217017
- Schluessel, Eric T (2014), The World as Seen from Yarkand: Ghulām Muḥammad Khān's 1920s Chronicle Mā Tīṭayniŋ wā qiʿasi, NIHU Program Islamic Area Studies, ISBN 978-4-904039-83-0
- Suiming, Pan (1996), "禁止卖淫：它为谁服务 [Jìnzhǐ màiyín: Tā wèi shéi fúwù? The prohibition of prostitution: whom does it serve?]", 艾滋病：社会、伦理和法律问题专家研讨会 [Aizibing: shehui, lunli he falü wenti zhuanjia yantaohui: Report of the Expert Workshop on HIV and Prostitution: Social, Ethical and Legal Issues] (29–31 October)
- Suiming, Pan (1999a), "Zhongguo hongdengqu jishi" [A True Record of China’s Red Light Districts], Qunyan Chubanshe
- Suiming, Pan (1999b), "Cunzai yu huangmiu: zhongguo dixia xingchanye kaocha" [Existence and absurdity: China's underground sexual industry], Qunyan Chubanshe
- Tamm, Eric Enno (2011), The Horse that Leaps Through Clouds: A Tale of Espionage, the Silk Road, and the Rise of Modern China, Counterpoint Press, ISBN 9781582437347
- Xin, Ren (1 December 1999), "Prostitution and Economic Modernization in China", Violence Against Women, 5 (12)
- Zhiping, Zhang (12 June 2000), "Does China need a red-light district?", Beijing Review
- European Journal of East Asian Studies. Vol. 1–2. Brill. 2001.
- East Asian History. Vol. 5–6. Institute of Advanced Studies, Australian National University. 1993.
