= 7th Beijing College Student Film Festival =

2000 film festival in Beijing, China

The 7th Beijing College Student Film Festival (simplified Chinese: 第七届北京大学生电影节; traditional Chinese: 第七屆北京大學生電影節) was held from 17 April to 9 May 2000 in Beijing, China.

== Awards ==
- Best Film Award: Something About Secret
- Best Director Award: Lu Xuechang for A Lingering Face
- Best Actor Award: Jiang Wu for Shower
- Best Actress Award: Jiang Shan for Something About Secret
- Best Visual Effects Award: Crash Landing
- Best Supporting Actor Award
- Best Supporting Actress Award
- Best Newcomer Award: Pan Yueming for A Lingering Face
- Favorite Actor Award: Pu Cunxin for Shower
- Favorite Actress Award: Xu Fan for A Sigh
- Favorite Film: Shower
- Artistic Exploration Award: None
- Committee Special Award: Fight for Nanjing, Shanghai and Hangzhou, My 1919
- Special Jury Award: Roaring Across the Horizon
- Special Science and Education Film Award: Cosmos and Man
- Special Award for Child Actor: Cao Dan for Thatched Memories
