= Liu Yonghong =

Chinese cinematographer

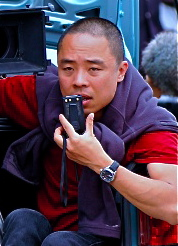
- Born: Luoyang, Henan
- Occupation: Cinematographer
- Years active: 1990s-present
- Awards: ADF Cinematographer Award; 2003 Blind Shaft

Chinese name
- Traditional Chinese: 劉勇宏
- Simplified Chinese: 刘勇宏
Transcriptions

Liu Yonghong (simplified Chinese: 刘勇宏; traditional Chinese: 劉勇宏) is a Chinese cinematographer, based in Beijing. His work was recognized at the 23rd Manaki Brothers International Film Camera Festival, for his work as director of photography on Seafood (2001). As well as at the Buenos Aires International Festival of Independent Cinema, for his work as director of photography on Blind Shaft (2003).

== Biography ==
Liu Yonghong was born in Luoyang City, Henan Province. He grew up in the aftermath of the Cultural Revolution and during the Reform and Opening Up movement. At 21 Liu went to study architecture at Yangzhou University. After working as an architect for six years he was awarded a place to study Cinematography at the Beijing Film Academy. Liu graduated in 2000 with a master's degree in Cinematography and Film Theory. He attended the Central Academy of Drama and Television Arts from 2001 to 2004 and was awarded a Doctorate in Drama and Operatic Studies.

== Career ==
Liu's first work as a cinematographer was on the film There’s a Strong Wind in Beijing, directed by AnQi Ju. The film was featured in the Forum section of the Berlinale Film Festival in 2000. His next film Seafood with director Zhu Wen was also screened at the Berlinale Film Festival in 2002 and won awards in France, Venice, Singapore and Japan. Liu won the ADF Cinematographer Award for Blind Shaft in 2003. Blind Shaft in total won 12 awards and was nominated for six. Grain in Ear won the ACID award at Cannes in 2005. Grain in Ear was described as "exquisitely photographed" particularly Liu's use "multiple passages (doorways, windows, TV screens) within what might seem like a simple, enclosed mise en scene."

== Filmography ==
=== As cinematographer ===
Year	English Title	Chinese Title	Director	Notes
1999	There's a Strong Wind in Beijing	北京的风很大	AnQi Ju	
2001	Seafood	海鲜	Zhu Wen	
2002	Blind Shaft	盲井	Li Yang	ADF Cinematographer Award for Best Cinematography at the 2003 Buenos Aires International Festival of Independent Cinema
2003	Tang Poetry	唐诗	Zhang Lü	
2005	Bullion	银饰	Huang Jianzhong	
2005	Grain in Ear	芒种	Zhang Lü	
2006	The Contract	租妻	Lu Xuechang	
2006	Luxury Car	江城夏日	Wang Chao	
2007	Mona Lisa		Li Ying	
2008	Two People Under The Same Roof	两个人的房间	Lu Xuechang	
2008	Knitting	牛郎织女	Yin Lichuan	

=== As director ===
- One Day (2014)
