= Seafood (film) =

2001 Chinese film directed by Zhu Wen

- Film poster
- Traditional Chinese: 海鮮
- Simplified Chinese: 海鲜
- Hanyu Pinyin: Hǎixiān
- Directed by: Zhu Wen
- Written by: Zhu Wen
- Produced by: Zhu Wen; Mou Sen
- Starring: Jin Ze; Cheng Taisheng
- Cinematography: Liu Yonghong
- Edited by: Zhu Wen
- Distributed by: Golden Network Asia
- Release date: 2001
- Running time: 84 minutes
- Country: China
- Language: Mandarin

Seafood (simplified Chinese: 海鲜; traditional Chinese: 海鮮; pinyin: Hǎixiān) is a 2001 Chinese film directed by the established writer Zhu Wen. Though Seafood was Zhu's first film as director, he had already gained some experience with filmmaking as a screenwriter for Zhang Ming (in 1996's Rain Clouds over Wushan) and Zhang Yuan (in 1999's Seventeen Years). Seafood was produced independently by Thought Dance Entertainment and Zhu's own Zhu Wen Workshop.

The film depicts a self-destructive prostitute (Jin Ze) who attempts to commit suicide in a resort town by the sea. She is thwarted by a police officer (Cheng Taisheng) whose unorthodox methods of "rehabilitating" her consists of seafood and rape. As a result of the film's dark premise, Seafood has been called "one of the most transgressive visions of China...ever witnessed."

Never released in China, the film nevertheless was well received abroad, where it won numerous awards most notably at the 2001 Venice International Film Festival.

== Plot ==
Zhang Xiaomei (Jin Ze), is a prostitute living in Beijing. When relationship problems with her boyfriend erupt, she flees to the resort city of Beidaihe and takes a room in a small hotel where she contemplates committing suicide. There she meets a young poet. The next morning, she wakes and learns that the poet has slit his wrists.

When the police arrive, she meets Deng Jianguo (Cheng Taisheng), a middle-aged officer who questions her over the poet's death. Their relationship soon grows increasingly complicated as Deng learns of Xiaomei's plans to commit suicide. Over the course of several days, he takes her to eat seafood dinners, extolling the virtues and health benefits of the diet, including a claim that it makes him a more potent lover. When Xiaomei tries to commit suicide in a nearby town, she is thwarted by Deng who brings her back to Beidaihe and proceeds to rape her.

Xiaomei eventually leaves the seaside town for Beijing again.

== Production ==
Seafood was shot entirely on handheld digital video. While some critics found the camerawork to be "routine" for the medium, one shot in particular was filmed not by the cinematographer, Liu Yonghung, but by Zhu Wen himself. Zhu has stated in an interview that this constituted the first time he had ever touched a camera and that he was so pleased with the naturalistic effect, that he ended up keeping the shot.

== Reception ==
Given the film's dark subject matter of rape and suicide, Zhu Wen had no illusions that the film would ever screen in his native China. In some ways, the inability to screen Seafood in China led Zhu to direct his second feature, South of the Clouds (2004) within the state-run film system, so that he would have a work that he could show to family and friends.

The film did well in the film festival circuit, however, winning a special jury prize at the Venice International Film Festival's Cinema of the Present competition and a grand jury prize at Cinemanila. The film also screened at a handful of other major festivals, such as Karlovy Vary, and Vancouver (out of competition).
