= Lease Wife =

- Film poster
- Directed by: Lu Xuechang
- Written by: Gong Xiangdong; Lu Xuechang
- Starring: Li Jiaxuan; Pan Yueming
- Cinematography: Liu Yonghong
- Music by: Dong Wei
- Production company: Zhongkai Culture Group
- Release date: March 17, 2006 (China)
- Running time: 98 minutes
- Country: China
- Language: Mandarin
- Budget: US$205,000

Lease Wife (Chinese: 租期; pinyin: Zū Qī) is a 2006 drama film directed by Lu Xuechang, and is the story of a man who pays a prostitute to pretend to be his wife when he goes back to his village to visit his family. It is also known as The Contract.

Lease Wife is Lu's fourth feature film and stars Li Jiaxuan as the prostitute, Lily, and Pan Yueming as the businessman, Guo Jiaju, who hires her.
