= Marc Ma =

Chinese actor (born 1979)

- Born: August 19, 1979 (age 47); Lanzhou, Gansu, China
- Occupation: Actor
- Years active: 2001-present

Chinese name
- Traditional Chinese: 馬浴柯
- Simplified Chinese: 马浴柯
Transcriptions
Standard Mandarin
- Hanyu Pinyin: Ma Yuke
Yue: Cantonese
- Jyutping: Maa5-juk6-ngo1
- Musical career
- Label: Universe Film

Ma Marc is a Chinese actor. He has appeared in many Chinese movies and TV dramas in supporting roles. He joined Universe International Holding Limited in March 2011.

== Personal life ==
Ma was born in Lanzhou, the capital city of Gansu Province in Northwest China. His father was a drama actor, therefore he was interested in acting. After graduating high school, he left his hometown and went to Beijing to take the Central Academy of Drama entrance exam. However he failed the exam. To pursue his dream, he became one of the Beijing drifters. Ma mentioned in an interview that he earned his living in Beijing by working as waiter and car wash worker at that time.

In 2000, he worked as production assistant in a TV drama production company. In 2003, he acted as the role "You Tanzhi" in the TV drama Demi-Gods and Semi-Devils directed by Zhang Jizhong. Since then he has been cast in an increasing number of roles.

In the movie The White Storm (2013), he acted as an uppity young Tsimshatsui gangster Dune Kun and built a good reputation in China.

== Filmography ==
Year	Film	Role	Director	Notes'
1991	Fazike (筏子客)	Shuan-wa (栓娃)	Yao Shou-gang (姚守崗)	Child Actor
2010	Xuanwu Tian'e (炫舞天鵝)	Li Liang (李良)	Yu Zhi-lin (余治林)	
2011	Sleepwalker	Professor Yip	Pang brothers	
2013	Out of Inferno	Ho	Danny Pang, Oxide Pang	
2013	The White Storm	Dune Kun	Benny Chan	
2014	The Boundary (邊緣綫)	Lin Zi-xiong	Wang Tao (汪濤)	
2015	Little Big Master		Adrian Kwan Shun-Fai	
2015	Wild City		Ringo Lam	
2015	Blind Spot (探靈檔案)	Chen Bo-han	Danny Pang	
2015	Age of Glory (鋼鐵是這樣煉成的)	Zhao Zhong-cheng	Xu Geng	
2015	Detective Chinatown	Tony	Chen Sicheng	
2019	The Big Shot			
2019	Love Song to the Days Forgone			
2019	Shock Wave 2			
2019	S.W.A.T. (特警队)		Ding Sheng	
2020	Detective Chinatown (web series)	Jia De		in Season 1, "Name of the Rose"
2021	Door Lock (門鎖)	Li Youlin		
2021	My Son (只要你過得比我好)			
2022	The Tipping Point (掃黑行動)	Zhang Bing		
2023	Wolf Hiding (怒潮)	Hugo		Also served as Director and Scenarist
2024	Detective Chinatown 2 (web series)	An Song		in Season 2, "Angel's Melody"
2024	Go for Broke (重生)	Balai		Also served as Director and Scenarist
2024	Good Luck (好运来)	Jiajia		
2025	Unusual Deal (非常交易)	Jiege		
2026	Go for Broke 2 (重生2)			Served as Director and Scenarist

== Awards ==
=== Hundred Flowers Awards ===
Year	Categories	Film	Role	Remark
2014	Best Newcomer	The White Storm	Dune Kun	Won
