= Zhu Xuzhi =

Chinese officer

- 朱虚之
- Born: Zhu Wenlin (朱文麟); 1912; Linhai, Zhejiang, China
- Died: 2000 (aged 87–88); Beijing, China
- Relatives: Zhu Zhu
- Military career
- Allegiance: China
- Branch: People's Liberation Army Air Force
- Service years: 1931–2000
- Rank: Major General (Shao Jiang)
- Unit: 18th Group Army
- Commands: Deputy Chief of Staff of the PLA Air Force (1969-1971)
- Conflicts: Chinese Civil War; Second Sino-Japanese War; Chinese Communist Revolution
- Awards: Order of Bayi; Order of Independence and Freedom; Order of Liberation; Red Heart Order

Zhu Xuzhi (simplified Chinese: 朱虚之; traditional Chinese: 朱虛之; pinyin: Zhū Xūzhī; 1912-8 November 2000) was a general in the People's Liberation Army of China.

== Biography ==
Zhu was born Zhu Wenlin (朱文麟) in Linhai, Zhejiang in 1912, son of Zhu Zhikang (朱之康). His courtesy name used at school, Zhu Wen (朱雯). He had an elder brother, Zhu Wenbiao (朱文彪). He attended Huipu School, Taizhou High School, and Zhongnan High School. He graduated from Whampoa Military Academy. After college, he went to Jiangxi with Mao Bingwen to fight against the Red Army but was captured during a battle. Zhu joined the Chinese Workers' and Peasants' Red Army in 1931 and joined the Chinese Communist Party in May 1933. He worked in the 18th Group Army in 1937 and the Political Department of Shandong Column in 1940. In 1943, he was sent to Yan'an to study at the Central Party School of the Chinese Communist Party. In late 1945, he worked in the PLA Fourth Field Army; in 1945, he was also elected as a member of the 7th National Congress of the Chinese Communist Party.

In 1953, he became the First Deputy Head of the PLA Air Force Cadre Management Department, he remained in that position until 1960, when he was appointed the Political Commissar of the PLA Air Force Technical Department. He was promoted to the rank of Major General (Shao Jiang) in 1955. In 1969, he was promoted to become the Deputy Chief of Staff of the PLA Air Force.

On November 10, 1971, Zhu was examined in isolation by the Red Guards. He was sent to the May Seventh Cadre Schools to work between 1976 and 1979. From 1979 to 1989, he lived in Jinan, capital of Shandong province. He was politically rehabilitated in February 1988 and died in Beijing on November 8, 2000.

== Personal life ==
Zhu had four sons: Zhu Songbin (朱松滨), Zhu Hanbin (朱汉斌), Zhu Yunbin (朱运彬), and Zhu Haibin (朱海滨). His granddaughter, Zhu Zhu (daughter of Zhu Hanbin), is a noted actress and singer.
