= The Old Cinderella =

- Directed by: Wu Bai
- Written by: Gao Yanan
- Produced by: Lu Chuan
- Starring: Zhang Jingchu; Pan Yueming; Kenji Wu; Zhu Zhu
- Cinematography: Charlie Lam
- Release date: March 7, 2014
- Running time: 93 mins
- Country: China
- Language: Mandarin
- Box office: US$8,340,000

The Old Cinderella (Chinese: 脱轨时代) is a 2014 Chinese romantic comedy film directed by Wu Bai and starring Zhang Jingchu, Pan Yueming and Kenji Wu. A large portion of the film was shot in Israel.

== Plot ==
Xu Ke is a divorced woman in her 30s with a 5 year old son. After her divorce, she meets with rich and handsome Kang Shengxie by accident but doubts his intentions, while her ex-husband Liu Guangmang tries to rekindle the love they shared before he cheated on her. It is up to her to decide whom she will pick.

== Cast ==
- Zhang Jingchu - Xu Ke
- Pan Yueming
- Kenji Wu
- Zhu Zhu
- Ban Jiajia
