= The Boundary (2014 film) =

- Directed by: Wang Tao
- Starring: Liu Ye; Vincent Zhao
- Production companies: Wuhan Yindu Cultural Media Co., Ltd; Shanghai Haishang Pictures Entertainment Co., Ltd; Zhejiang Taobao Network Co. Ltd.
- Release date: November 6, 2014
- Running time: 104 minutes
- Country: China
- Language: Mandarin
- Box office: ¥13.10 million (China)

The Boundary (Chinese: 全城通缉) is a 2014 Chinese suspense action crime drama film directed by Wang Tao. It was released on November 6.

== Cast ==
- Liu Ye
- Vincent Zhao
- Choo Ja-hyun
- Guli Nazha
- Xue Haowen
- Chan Hwi
- Marc Ma
- Wu Peirou

== Reception ==
By November 7, the film had earned ¥13.10 million at the Chinese box office.
