= Provoking Laughter =

- Poster
- Chinese: 冒牌卧底
- Directed by: Tang Xu
- Starring: Pan Yueming; Wu Yue; Chang Yuan; Archie Kao; Tan Kai; Lin Peng
- Production company: Zhongguang Defeng Culture Investment
- Distributed by: Dadi Century Films Distribution (Beijing)
- Release date: 29 December 2016
- Running time: 1:30:00
- Country: China
- Language: Mandarin
- Box office: CN¥21.1 million

Provoking Laughter is a 2016 Chinese adventure crime comedy film directed by Tang Xu and starring Pan Yueming, Wu Yue, Chang Yuan, Archie Kao, Tan Kai and Lin Peng. It was released in China by Dadi Century Films Distribution on 29 December 2016.

== Cast ==
- Pan Yueming
- Wu Yue
- Chang Yuan
- Archie Kao
- Tan Kai
- Lin Peng
- Chin Shih-chieh

== Reception ==
The film has grossed CN¥21.1 million in China.
