= Tubelight (2017 Hindi film) =

2017 Indian war drama film by Kabir Khan

- Theatrical release poster
- Directed by: Kabir Khan
- Written by: Screenplay: Kabir Khan; Alejandro Monteverde; Pepe Portillo; Parveez Sheikh; Dialogues: Manu Rishi Chadha
- Story by: Kabir Khan; Alejandro Monteverde; Pepe Portillo
- Based on: Little Boy by Alejandro Gómez Monteverde
- Produced by: Salman Khan; Kabir Khan; Salma Khan
- Starring: Salman Khan; Sohail Khan; Om Puri; Matin Rey Tangu; Zhu Zhu
- Cinematography: Aseem Mishra
- Edited by: Rameshwar S. Bhagat
- Music by: Score: Julius Packiam; Songs: Pritam
- Production companies: Salman Khan Films; Kabir Khan Films
- Distributed by: NH Studioz (India); Yash Raj Films (International)
- Release date: 23 June 2017
- Running time: 136 minutes
- Country: India
- Language: Hindi
- Budget: ₹100 crore
- Box office: est. ₹211.14 crore

Tubelight is a 2017 Indian Hindi-language war drama film written and directed by Kabir Khan. Produced by Salman Khan and Kabir Khan, it is set in the 1962 Sino-Indian War. It stars Salman Khan and Sohail Khan in the lead roles, with Zhu Zhu (in her Hindi film debut), Matin Rey Tangu, Om Puri and Mohammed Zeeshan Ayyub in supporting roles. Shah Rukh Khan features in a guest appearance. Pritam composed music for the film, with a score by Julius Packiam. It is an adaptation of the 2015 American film Little Boy.

The film was released on 23 June 2017. It grossed an estimated ₹211.14 crore against a budget of ₹100 crore and received mixed-to-negative reviews from critics.

== Plot ==
In pre-independence India, Laxman Singh Bisht is a mentally-challenged child, living in the fictional town of Jagatpur in Kumaon division of what is modern day Uttarakhand. Laxman, although defended by his younger brother Bharat is bullied by his friends, who call him "Tubelight". A montage shows them grow up, showing the time when Gandhi visits their school, India's independence in 1947, Gandhi's assassination and the death of their parents, which brings them closer as they grow up.

In October 1962, the Chinese invade India, following which the Indian Army begins to set-up recruitment camps. From their village, only Bharat is selected and allotted the Kumaon Regiment. As they reach their post, war is declared and they come under heavy attack. Laxman anxiously waits for his brother to come back, running from post to post to find out about him.

He meets a magician, Gogo Pasha, who shows him a magic trick by making him move a bottle without touching. Pasha tells Laxman that the secret is 'faith', and that faith can do anything. Oblivious to it, he tries to repeat the trick to his villagers but fails. A village elder, Banne says "Faith moves a mountain" and explains how Laxman will find his faith.

Meanwhile, Bharat, while being evacuated after an injury, is ambushed and taken prisoner. He makes a plan with other prisoners to escape.

Laxman observes a woman Le Leing and a boy Gu Won, take a home nearby. Judging them by their appearance, he considers them to be Chinese and tries to report them to the authorities. Banne gets angry, and advises him to follow the wisdom of Gandhi, and befriend the woman and boy. After some attempts, he succeeds in befriending them and learns that they are Assamese and not Chinese.

Meanwhile, Bharat's escape plan fails and his fellows are killed. He too is shot and finds himself unable to move. Having no hope of survival, he exchanges his shoes with another soldier who has torn his, to give him a chance to escape. The other guy however gets killed as well.

Laxman learns of his brother's capture and becomes heartbroken, but Leing consoles him and encourages his faith. Laxman's friend, Narayan tries to attack Won, considering him to be Chinese, but is stopped by Laxman. He attempts to convince Laxman to not befriend Chinese people or he will lose Bharat forever; Leing tearfully tells them that they are Indians too. As Laxman tries to explain his belief in 'faith', Narayan challenges him to move a mountain; Laxman apparently succeeds as an earthquake is felt.

With ceasefire declared, the Army begin bringing back corpses. They find a dead body, with Bharat's shoe-tag and declare him dead. Laxman is grief-stricken and believes that people were right about him now that Bharat has been killed. As the friends celebrate the end of the war, Leing's lost father returns. Leing and Gu comforts Laxman as they bid farewell to return to Calcutta.

Laxman, still having a little faith in him, learns of the mistake in identifying corpses due to the interchanged shoes. They receive the news that Bharat is still alive but has lost his memory. At the medical camp, Laxman is reunited with his brother who is able to recognise Laxman, possibly restoring his memory.

== Cast ==
- Salman Khan as Laxman Singh Bisht (Tubelight)
  - Jason D'Souza as young Laxman Singh Bisht
- Sohail Khan as Bharat Singh Bisht
- Om Puri as Banne Chacha
- Mohammed Zeeshan Ayyub as Narayan Lal Tiwari
- Yashpal Sharma as Major Rajbir Tokas
- Matin Rey Tangu as Gu Won
- Zhu Zhu as Li Leing, Gu's mother
- Brijendra Kala as a shopkeeper
- Isha Talwar as Maya Singh Bisht
- Shah Rukh Khan as Magician Goga Pasha (cameo appearance)

== Production ==
Kabir Khan obtained a no objection certificate from the makers of the Kannada film Tubelight. The first schedule of filming started on 30 December 2012 in Ladakh. Chinese actress Zhu Zhu was finalised for the role, and she commenced shooting from 15 October 2013. The first schedule lasted for a month and was completed in April 2014.

Sequences were shot in Ladakh, Kashmir and Manali, Himachal Pradesh. film Is Previously Scheduled to release on 11 April 2015 and 3 September 2016.

== Release ==
Tubelight was released on 23 June 2017 and was distributed by NH Studioz in India and Yash Raj Films internationally. The film was banned by the Pakistan Central Board of Film Censors to promote the domestic film industry of the country.

== Reception ==
=== Critical response ===
The film received mixed-to-negative reviews from critics and audiences. On the review aggregator website Rotten Tomatoes, the film is rated is 27% based on 15 reviews, with an average rating of 5.02 out of 10.

Anupama Chopra gave 2.5 out of 5 stars and said "Basically, Tubelight is cinema as a sermon. Which makes the film flat and emotionally unconvincing. The good intentions and lectures on yakeen [faith] don’t translate into a gripping narrative." Shubhra Gupta of The Indian Express rated it 1.5/5, saying "The message is perfect, but when the main act isn't convincing, the film becomes just like the title: mostly flicker with a little late glow." Raja Sen of NDTV rated it 1/5, commenting "Poor little superstar who doesn't know better, the film is rendered unwatchable because of the leading man."

Taran Adarsh wrote "Solid star power Salman Khan. Stunning visuals. But Tubelight is body beautiful, minus soul." Rajeev Masand of News 18 gave the film 1.5 out of 5 stars and said, "Tubelight is well intentioned but overtly manipulative and doesn't so much tug at your heartstrings as it punches you in the face demanding that you care. It's also over-long at nearly 2 hours and 30 minutes, and excruciatingly slow and boring in parts."

Subhash K. Jha rated the film 3.5/5 stars, describing the film as "a film with a deep insight into a corrupted soul." DNA India rated the film 3.5/5 stars and wrote "Tubelight is about love, trust, magic and belief. It's like a tonic for weary souls. You will find yourself interacting with the film and characters."

India.com rated the film 3.5/5 stars and stated "Watch it if you are a Salman Khan fan. Watch it if you aren't but want to see Salman Khan do some serious acting." Tushar Joshi from Bollywood Life also rated it 3.5/5 stars, writing "Tubelight has a beautiful message of having faith and believing in the good. Salman Khan's sincere and heartfelt performance in the film will definitely move you." Meena Iyer of The Times of India rated the film 3/5 stars on grounds of values of family and strong bonding between brothers.

=== Box office ===
The film grossed ₹20.55 crore (US$2.2 million) on day 1 and became the 16th biggest domestic opener. Overall the film performed well at the box office, although it had grossed ₹200 crore (US$21 million) worldwide at the end of 10 days with ₹152 crore (US$16 million) coming from India itself.

The film's final gross stands at ₹211.14 crore (US$23 million) worldwide, including ₹165.64 crore (US$18 million) in India and ₹45.5 crore (US$4.9 million) overseas.

== Soundtrack ==
Tubelight

Soundtrack album by Pritam
- Released: 25 June 2017
- Recorded: 2013–15
- Studio: YRF Studios
- Genre: Feature film soundtrack
- Length: 48:10
- Language: Hindi
- Label: Sony Music India
- Producer: Salman Khan

Pritam chronology
Raabta (2017)	Tubelight (2017)	Jagga Jasoos (2017)

The music for the film was composed by Pritam while the lyrics were written by Amitabh Bhattacharya and Kausar Munir. The first song "Radio" sung by Kamaal Khan and Amit Mishra was released on 21 May 2017. The second song "Naach Meri Jaan" sung by Kamaal Khan, Dev Negi, Nakash Aziz and Tushar Joshi was released on 31 May 2017. The song titled "Tinka Tinka Dil Mera" voiced by Rahat Fateh Ali Khan was released on 9 June 2017. The fourth single to be released was "Main Agar" sung by Atif Aslam on 14 June 2017. The soundtrack consists of 10 tracks which was released by Sony Music India on 21 June 2017.

All music is composed by Pritam.

Track listing
No.	Title	Lyrics	Singer(s)	Length
1.	"Radio"	Amitabh Bhattacharya	Kamaal Khan, Amit Mishra	4:40
2.	"Naach Meri Jaan"	Amitabh Bhattacharya	Kamaal Khan, Nakash Aziz, Dev Negi, Tushar Joshi	4:47
3.	"Tinka Tinka Dil Mera"	Kausar Munir	Rahat Fateh Ali Khan	5:03
4.	"Main Agar"	Amitabh Bhattacharya	Atif Aslam	4:39
5.	"Kuch Nahi"	Kausar Munir	Javed Ali	3:41
6.	"Tinka Tinka Dil Mera" (ft. Jubin Nautiyal)	Kausar Munir	Jubin Nautiyal	5:06
7.	"Kuch Nahi" (Reprise)	Kausar Munir	Shafqat Amanat Ali	3:41
8.	"Main Agar" (Reprise)	Amitabh Bhattacharya	KK	3:28
9.	"Kuch Nahi" (Encore)	Kausar Munir	Papon	3:33
10.	"Radio" (Film Version)	Amitabh Bhattacharya	Kamaal Khan, Amit Mishra, Iulia Vantur, (Additional Vocal: Akashdeep Sengupta)	4:40
11.	"Radio" (Arabic Version)	Amitabh Bhattacharya	Douzi	4:50
Total length:				48:10

== Accolades ==
Award Ceremony	Category	Recipient	Result	Ref.(s)
10th Mirchi Music Awards	Best Song Producer (Programming & Arranging)	Sourav Roy, Prasad Sashte, Dj Phukan & Sunny M.R. – "Radio (Film Version)"	Nominated	
10th Mirchi Music Awards	Best Song Engineer (Recording & Mixing)	Shadab Rayeen, Ashwin Kulkarni, Himanshu Shirlekar & Aaroh Velankar – "Radio (Film Version)"	Nominated	

== See also ==
- Super Night with Tubelight
