= City Under Siege (2010 film) =

2010 Hong Kong film by Benny Chan

- Film poster
- Traditional Chinese: 全城戒備
- Simplified Chinese: 全城戒备
- Hanyu Pinyin: Chun sing gai bei
- Directed by: Benny Chan
- Screenplay by: Benny Chan; Rams Ling; Carson Lau
- Produced by: Benny Chan
- Starring: Aaron Kwok; Shu Qi; Collin Chou; Zhang Jingchu; Jacky Wu
- Cinematography: Fletcher Poon; Tony Cheung
- Edited by: Benny Chan; Chan Sing-yan
- Music by: Anthony Chue
- Production companies: Universe Entertainment; Beijing Enlight Pictures Limited; Shanxi Film Studio; Shenzhen Film Studio; Guangzhou City Ying Ming Culture Communication; Sirius Pictures
- Distributed by: Universe Films Distribution
- Release date: 12 August 2010
- Running time: 110 minutes
- Country: Hong Kong
- Languages: Cantonese; Mandarin; Japanese
- Budget: $10 million USD
- Box office: US$13,851,432

City Under Siege (simplified Chinese: 全城戒备; traditional Chinese: 全城戒備) is a 2010 Hong Kong science fiction action film directed, produced, co-edited and co-written by Benny Chan. The film stars Aaron Kwok, Shu Qi, Jacky Wu, Zhang Jingchu, and Collin Chou. The film follows a group of circus performers who goes on a rampage after an accidental exposure to chemical gas left by the Japanese army in World War II, granting them superhuman abilities.

== Plot ==
Many years ago, somewhere in Malaysia, when the Japanese are experimenting on some gases that mutate people, their lab explodes, killing everyone inside.

Sunny Lee (Li Fei) is the orphaned child of a former knife throwing master. Following his father's death, he is taken in by his uncle, who allows him to perform as a clown in a circus, since he did not inherit his father's knife throwing skills. Sunny still wants to be a knife thrower, though. He is tormented by Zhang and his cousins, who are all performers in his uncle's troupe.

One day, Sunny overhears a plan the rest of the troupe are making to explore a cave, rumored to be filled with gold. Instead of killing Sunny, they use him as the point man for their expedition. They find crates filled with capsules and force Sunny to open them. Inside the first are numerous plates of gold. They then try to kill Sunny, and continue opening the rest of the capsules, releasing the experimental gas which transforms them into superhuman monsters. In the chaos, Sunny accidentally kills Zhang's younger brother and he manages to escape the group's wrath. But he also gets exposed to the gas and collapses on a smuggler's ship heading to Hong Kong. He was thrown overboard when the crew discovered him.

A few days later, Angel Chan (Chen An'er), a reporter, discovers him in an obese state after Sunny wakes up from coma. He was driven to a safe house. While sleeping, Sunny drains his fat and excess water. He later wakes up in his normal form, but discovers that he now possesses superhuman strength and heightened abilities. He tries to contact his uncle, but gets shocked when he finds out that his uncle was arrested by the Malaysian police for the incident while he was interrupted by incessant mosquitoes flying to him.

Meanwhile, several armored cars, banks and jewelry shops worth millions of dollars were blown and stolen by unidentified persons and several medical experts were abducted as well. A mutant couple disguised as detectives decide to investigate the matter.

Angel was fired on her own program for a new and beautiful girl. While she's walking, she witnesses a hostage scene. Sunny also saw the scene and uses a stick to disarm the hostage taker. He becomes an instant hero, but he blows his cover to his mutated former troupe members. He also becomes a star and endorser when he was interviewed by Angel herself. Angel now acts as his agent cum manager. The troupe attempts to kill him for his blood, thinking that it now contains the antidote for the virus as except Sunny, all are mutating into horrible creatures. The attack is repelled with the help of Sun Hao and Xiuhua(the mutant couple) and one mutated member of the troupe is killed, but this exposes Sunny's weakness to cold. Meanwhile, doctors conclude that Sunny's blood contains antibodies that kills the poison in gas but doesn't affect his mutant powers. Sun and Xiuhua decide to become Sunny's bodyguards knowing that Zhang would attack again.

In one commercial shoot, Sunny gets attacked by the troupe again, nearly killing him, during which Zhang manages to subdue Sunny and drink his blood. But to his shock, the blood doesn't heal him but instead accelerates the mutation. The couple manage to escape with Sunny but Xiuhua dies from her injuries. Sun agrees to train Sunny to help him in Zhang and the other surviving mutant. Meanwhile, Zhang is smitten by Angel and asks her to come to him. Angel agrees to meet him at a hotel which is actually a police trap. However Zhang kills several officers and is then confronted by Sunny. Sun manages to kill Zhang's mutant cousin by a suicide explosion. Sunny kills Zhang by using his knife throwing skills when Zhang injures Angel.

Angel and Sunny now are living happily together and they have a son.

== Cast ==
- Aaron Kwok as Sunny Lee
- Shu Qi as Angel Chan
- Collin Chou as Zhang Dachu
- Zhang Jingchu as Zheng Xiuhua
- Jacky Wu as Sun Hao

== Release ==
The film was released in Hong Kong on 12 August 2010.
