= Red River (2009 film) =

- Directed by: Zhang Jiarui
- Written by: Zhang Jiarui; Jiazong Meng; Daju Yuan; Yiping Liu; Chongmin Luo; Ted Perkins; Fusheng Yang; Xin Yin
- Produced by: Alina Y. Qiu; Bruce Feirstein
- Starring: Zhang Jingchu; Nick Cheung; Loletta Lee; Danny Lee Sau-Yin
- Cinematography: Yong-Hwan Jin
- Edited by: Jiarui Zhang; Yifan Zhang
- Music by: Wei Dong; Sijun Liu
- Release date: 10 April 2009
- Running time: 100 minutes
- Country: China
- Languages: Mandarin; Vietnamese

Red River (simplified Chinese: 红河; traditional Chinese: 紅河; pinyin: Hóng hé) is a 2009 film starring Zhang Jingchu, Nick Cheung, Loletta Lee, Danny Lee Sau-Yin and is directed by Zhang Jiarui.

== Plot ==
A Tao (Zhang Jingchu) living near Red River at the Vietnam/Chinese border, is a mentally handicapped Vietnamese girl due to witnessing the violent death of her father, who stepped on a land mine while recovering her kite.

After she has grown up, she moved to China to work as a cleaner for A Shui (Loletta Lee), who is her deceased father's sister and runs a massage parlor. A Shan (Nick Cheung), a former theatre actor, operates a road side karaoke in town and vaguely resembles A Tao's father. A Tao soon becomes attracted to him.

Boss Shaba (Danny Lee Sau-Yin), a regular big spender at Ah Shui's massage parlor, suffered injuries and lost his lower right leg during the Vietnam War. He has earned his money by parallel importing American cigarettes. Due to his temper and appearance, no massage girl wants to serve him. Shaba then asked for A Tao who did not know him and was not afraid. Shaba thus takes a liking to A Tao.

Upon discovering A Tao's singing and crowd pulling abilities, A Shan offered to take her off A Shui's hands, which Ah Shui agrees for 200 renminbi plus a temporary resident permit for A Tao. When Shaba found out that A Tao is no longer at the massage parlour, he sent his men to get her back for him.

== Cast ==
- Jingchu Zhang as A Tao
- Nick Cheung as A Xia
- Loletta Lee as A Shui
- Danny Lee as Sha Ba
- Hua Ye as A Hua

== Awards ==
"Red River" was selected as the Most Outstanding Film of the Competition Section of Chungmuro Film Festival.
