= Something About Secret =

- Hong Kong DVD cover
- Traditional Chinese: 說出你的秘密
- Simplified Chinese: 说出你的秘密
- Literal meaning: Out with Your Secret
- Hanyu Pinyin: Shuōchū Nǐ de Mìmì
- Directed by: Huang Jianxin
- Screenplay by: Si Wu
- Produced by: Fang Wen; Cheng Weidong; Fu Yuelin
- Starring: Jiang Shan; Wang Zhiwen
- Cinematography: Zhang Xiaoguang
- Edited by: Lei Qin
- Music by: Xiang Min
- Production company: Zhejiang Film Studio
- Release date: 1999 (China)
- Running time: 99 minutes
- Country: China
- Language: Mandarin

Something About Secret is a 1999 Chinese drama film directed by Huang Jianxin. It stars Wang Zhiwen and Jiang Shan as a middle-class couple whose happy marriage begins to crumble after the wife commits a hit and run while driving under the influence.

== Cast ==
- Jiang Shan as He Liying
- Wang Zhiwen as Li Guoqiang, He Liying's husband
- Su Qifeng as Li Jia, He Liying's son
- Wang Lin as Sha Ping, He Liying's former classmate and best friend
- Ruan Danning as Li Xiaoya, Li Guoqiang's younger sister
- Liu Zifeng as Xia Gong, Li Guoqiang's colleague
- Zhu Yin as Xia Gong's wife
- Wu Yue as Zheng Chang, Li Guoqiang's colleague
- Zhang Jianhong as the Victim
- Hou Yaqi as the Victim's daughter
- Ju Hao as the Victim's husband
- Da Shichang as Party secretary
- Niu Piao as Feng Jian
- Hou Chuangao as Fan, He Liying's former classmate
- Mao Wei as Guan, He Liying's former classmate
- Xu Zheng as Zhang, He Liying's chauffeur
- Qian Zhi as the mechanic
- Niu Zhenhua as Huang
- Chang Xueren as Li Guoqiang's father
- Lu Zaiyun as Li Guoqiang's mother
- He Saifei as employee in He Liying's firm
- Faye Yu as Li Xiaoya's classmate

== Awards and nominations ==
| Award | Category | Individual | Result |
|---|---|---|---|
| 2000 7th Beijing College Student Film Festival | Best Film | | Won |
| 2000 7th Beijing College Student Film Festival | Best Actress | Jiang Shan | Won |
| 2000 Shanghai Film Critics Awards | Film of Merit | | Won |
