= Blind Spot (2015 film) =

- Poster
- 探灵档案
- Directed by: Danny Pang
- Written by: Li Yongqin; Danny Pang
- Produced by: Stephen Lam; Marc Ma
- Starring: Marc Ma; Wu Xin; Pan Yueming; Wang Jingchun; Monica Mok; Zhu Yuchen; Timmy Hung; Danny Chan Kwok-kwan
- Cinematography: Zhang Ruigeng
- Edited by: Li Yongqin
- Music by: Wong Kin-Wai
- Production companies: YiMa Shidai Media (Beijing); Beijing Shengtang Times Media; Shandong Jiabo Media; Yangzhou Fuhai Guolong Entertainment (Limited Partnership) 京兆鸿（北京）投资管理有限公司; Tencent Video; Guangzhou Pinjing Film & Television Production; Erling Yier (Beijing) Media
- Distributed by: Ningbo Fenghai Media
- Release date: 23 October 2015
- Running time: 92 minutes
- Country: China
- Language: Mandarin
- Box office: CN¥3.16 million

Blind Spot (Chinese: 探灵档案) is a 2015 Chinese suspense thriller film directed by Danny Pang. The film was released on October 23, 2015.

== Cast ==
- Marc Ma
- Wu Xin
- Pan Yueming
- Wang Jingchun
- Monica Mok
- Zhu Yuchen
- Timmy Hung
- Danny Chan Kwok-kwan

== Reception ==
The film has earned CN¥3.16 million at the Chinese box office.
