= Pan Yueming =

Chinese actor

- 潘粤明
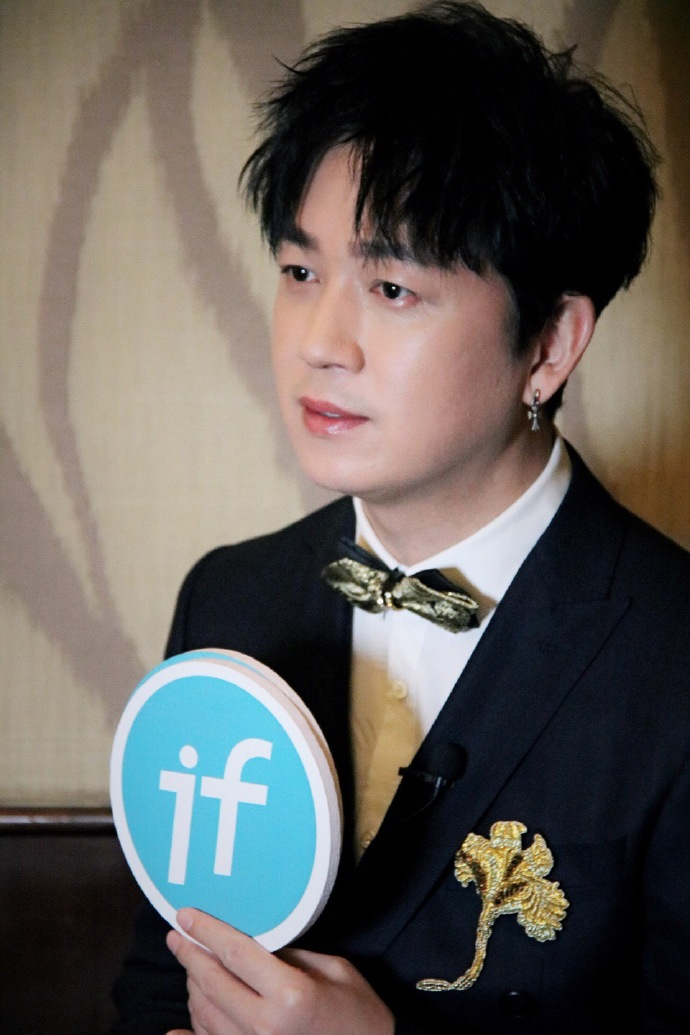
- Pan at the 2017 Cosmo Beauty Ceremony
- Born: May 9, 1974 (age 52); Xuanwu District, Beijing, China
- Education: Beijing Normal University
- Occupation: Actor
- Years active: 1994–present
- Spouse: Dong Jie (m. 2008; div. 2012)
- Children: 1

Chinese name
- Traditional Chinese: 潘粵明
- Simplified Chinese: 潘粤明
Transcriptions
Standard Mandarin
- Hanyu Pinyin: Pān Yuèmíng

Pan Yueming (Chinese: 潘粤明; born 9 May 1974) is a Chinese actor. Pan is noted for his roles as Tai Lin in the film A Love of Blueness, and as twin brothers Guan Hongfeng and Guan Hongyu on the Chinese web series Day and Night.

Pan ranked 97th on Forbes China Celebrity 100 list in 2019, and 64th in 2020.

== Early life ==
Pan was born and raised in Xuanwu District, Beijing, while his ancestral home in Xinfeng County, Shaoguan, Guangdong. His father Pan Zhiguang was a director of a department of the Public Security Bureau, and his mother was an employee of a state-owned enterprise. Pan graduated with a degree in arts from Beijing Normal University.

== Career ==
Pan made his acting debut in Romance of the Three Kingdoms, playing Sun Xiu, son of Sun Quan and the third Emperor of Eastern Wu. Pan's first film role was uncredited appearance in the film The Story of Yi Bo (1994).

In 2000, Pan played the lead role in Lu Xuechang's A Lingering Face, which earned him a Best New Performer Award at the Beijing College Student Film Festival.

In 2001, Pan co-starred with Yuan Quan in Huo Jianqi's A Love of Blueness, based on the novel Performance Art by Fang Fang, for which he received the Best Actor Award nominations at the Golden Rooster Award and Hundred Flowers Awards. At the same year, he won the Golden Phoenix Award for Male Actor. Pan portrayed Fang Yi'an, the son of prime minister Fang Xuanling, in the historical television series Love Legend of the Tang Dynasty.

Pan won the TV Film Best Actor Award at the Beijing College Student Film Festival for his performance in Desire For Fired, and was nominated for Best Supporting Actor Award at the Hundred Flowers Awards for his performance in Life Show.

Pan earned his second Hundred Flowers Award for Best Actor nomination for his performance as Lin Wei in Extreme Danger (2002). That same year, he starred in Stormy Sea, and won the Outstanding New Actor Award at the Huabiao Awards.

In 2004, Pan was cast in the historical television series The Legendary Emperor Zhu Yuanzhang, playing the son of Chen Baoguo's and Xu Fan's characters.

In 2007, Pan appeared as Zhu Huifang, a Beijing Opera actor who is Mei Lanfang's cousin, in Chen Kaige's film Forever Enthralled.

Pan had a cameo appearance in Looking for Jackie, a 2009 film starring Zhang Yishan and Jackie Chan. He was cast in the comedy film All's Well, Ends Well 2010, in which he played a couple with Xiong Dailin.

In 2010, Pan portrayed Cai Hesen, who was an early leader of the Chinese Communist Party (CCP) and a friend and comrade of Mao Zedong, in the film The Founding of a Party.

In 2013, Pan reunited with co-star Zhang Jingchu in the romantic comedy film The Old Cinderella.

In 2015, Pan was cast in the film Blind Spot, playing Chen Wen, a psychopathic teacher.

In 2016, Pan was cast in the television series How Much Love Can Be Repeated.

On August 30, 2017, the web series Day and Night was released on Youku, in which Pan played the lead roles Guan Hongfeng and Guan Hongyu.

== Personal life ==
Pan began dating Dong Jie in August 2005, when they filmed in Hongyifan. Dong was engaged to Pan in the early 2008. On September 26, 2008, Pan married Dong and they have a son Dingding (born on February 5, 2009).

On October 20, 2012, they were divorced. The agent of Dong stated that Pan is a gambler, Pan accused them of defamation. In May 2014, Pan finally won the lawsuit. The team of Dong was adjudged to apologize to him publicly.

== Filmography ==
=== Film ===
| Year | English title | Chinese title | Role | Notes/Ref. |
|---|---|---|---|---|
| 1994 | The Story of Yi Bo | 依波的故事 | Yang Meng | |
| 2000 | A Love of Blueness | 蓝色爱情 | Tai Lin | |
| 2000 | A Lingering Face | 非常夏日 | Lei Haiyang | |
| 2001 | Desire For Fired | 情不自禁 | Xiao Bai | |
| 2002 | Love From Heart | 从心相恋 | Ma Xiaotao | |
| 2002 | Stormy Sea | 惊涛骇浪 | Zhang Chengwen | |
| 2002 | Life Show | 生活秀 | Lai Shuangjiu | |
| 2002 | Extreme Danger | 极度险情 | Lin Wei | |
| 2002 | Key to The Love | 爱情钥匙 | Han Jingming | |
| 2003 | Marry a Beijing Girl | 太想爱你 | Zhou Zhengwu | |
| 2004 | I Only Care About You | 我只在乎你 | Shi Xinyu | |
| 2006 | Lease Wife | 租妻 | Guo Jiaju | |
| 2008 | Forever Enthralled | 梅兰芳 | Zhu Huifang | |
| 2009 | Class Three, Class Five | 三班五班 | Fu Xiaofeng | |
| 2009 | Looking for Jackie | 寻找成龙 | | Cameo |
| 2009 | Tian'anmen | 天安门 | Tian Zhenying | |
| 2009 | Boys and Girls | 男生女生 | Fu Xiaofeng | |
| 2010 | All's Well, Ends Well 2010 | 花田囍事2010 | Wu Shangjin | |
| 2011 | The Founding of a Party | 建党伟业 | Cai Hesen | |
| 2011 | The Empire Symbol | 帝国秘符 | Cheng Xi | |
| 2013 | Big Mouth | 大嘴巴子 | | |
| 2014 | Forever Young | 怒放之青春再见 | Ma Lu | |
| 2014 | The Old Cinderella | 脱轨时代 | Liu Guangmang | |
| 2015 | Blind Spot | 探灵档案 | Chen Wen | |
| 2015 | Detective Chinatown | 唐人街探案 | Li | |
| 2016 | Provoking Laughter | 冒牌卧底 | Wei Baobao | |
| 2017 | Six Years, Six Days | 六年，六天 | | Cameo |
| 2018 | Crazy Little Thing | 为你写诗 | | Cameo |
| 2019 | The Big Shot | 大人物 | | |
| 2019 | My Dear Elephant | 我的宠物是大象 | | |
| 2020 | Oversize Love | 月半爱丽丝 | James | |
| 2024 | Decoded | 解密 | | |

=== Television series ===
| Year | English title | Chinese title | Role | Notes/Ref. |
|---|---|---|---|---|
| 1991 | Romance of the Three Kingdoms | 三国演义 | Sun Xiu | |
| 1995 | 13 Holidays | 十三天假日 | Pan Yueming | |
| 1996 | Campus Pioneer | 校园先锋 | Zhang Duan | |
| 1998 | | 大考之年 | | |
| 1998 | Zhang Damin's Happy Life | 贫嘴张大民的幸福生活 | Zhao Bingwen | |
| 1998 | | 兄弟情仇 | Ding Delong | |
| 1999 | Youth Setting Out | 青春出动 | Zhu Jingtao | |
| 2000 | Never Look Back | 绝不回头 | Mai Zi | |
| 2000 | | 就赌这一次 | Tang Ming | |
| 2000 | The Story of West District | 西区故事 | | |
| 2001 | Files of Fallen Stars | 沉星档案 | Du Xiong | |
| 2002 | Love Legend of the Tang Dynasty | 大唐情史 | Fang Yi'ai | |
| 2002 | Stories of Youth | 青春的童话 | Wu Jiaju | |
| 2003 | Spicy Girl | 麻辣女友 | Mu Qingyuan | |
| 2003 | | 铁血青春 | Ma Chao | |
| 2004 | Thrill | 心跳 | Zhou Jun | |
| 2004 | Sunny Beauties | 阳光丽人 | Ji Huanning | |
| 2004 | The Black Ant | 黑蚂蚁 | Su Yan | |
| 2005 | Moment in Peking | 京华烟云 | Zeng Sunya | |
| 2005 | Town Chief | 镇长 | Dai Xing | |
| 2006 | The Legendary Emperor Zhu Yuanzhang | 传奇皇帝朱元璋 | Zhu Biao | Cameo |
| 2006 | | 红衣坊 | Zhang Tianyun | |
| 2006 | Madame White Snake | 白蛇传 | Xu Xian | |
| 2007 | | 热浪岛 | Sun Ke | |
| 2007 | | 幸福不拒绝眼泪 | Gao Xiaoyuan | |
| 2008 | The Fairies of Liaozhai | 聊斋奇女子之宦娘 | Wen Ruchun | |
| 2008 | The Wandering Songstress | 天涯歌女 | Qi Ming | |
| 2009 | Peacocks Fly to the Southeast | 孔雀东南飞 | Jiao Zhongqing | |
| 2009 | | 新情义无价 | Zhong Kaiqiang | |
| 2010 | Boy's Diary | 男生日记 | Fu Xiaofeng | Cameo |
| 2011 | Heroic Legend | 新萍踪侠影 | Zhang Danfeng | |
| 2011 | | 富滇风云 | Deng Tianze | |
| 2011 | | 山里红 | Xie Bomin | |
| 2011 | | 盘龙卧虎高山顶 | Yang Zuoxin | |
| 2012 | | 苍天圣土 | Guangxu Emperor | |
| 2013 | | 院里院外一家人 | Ding Daqiang | |
| 2014 | The Scholars | 儒林外史 | Fan Jin | |
| 2014 | Cosmetology High | 美人制造 | Wu Meisi | |
| 2014 | Youth without Limit | 青春无极限 | Lin Kanghui | |
| 2014 | Go Out the Country Entrance | 走出国门 | Cai Jiasheng | |
| 2016 | How Much Love Can be Repeated | 多少爱，可以重来 | Wen Hui | |
| 2017 | Boy Hood | 我们的少年时代 | Daddy Ban | Cameo |
| 2017 | Day and Night | 白夜追凶 | Guan Hongfeng/ Guan Hongyu | |
| 2018 | Mystery of Antiques | 古董局中局 | Xu Yicheng | |
| 2019 | Candle in the Tomb: The Wrath of Time | 鬼吹灯之怒晴湘西 | Chen Yulou | |
| 2019 | Unbeatable You | 逆流而上的你 | Yang Guang | |
| 2020 | Reborn | 重生 | Guan Hongfeng | |
| 2020 | Candle in the Tomb: The Lost Caverns | 鬼吹灯之龙岭迷窟 | Hu Bayi | |
| 2020 | Don't Think Twice, Love's All Right | 爱我就别想太多 | Mo Heng | |
| 2020 | Inside Man | 局中人 | Shen Lin | |
| 2020 | Get Married Or Not | 我不是结不了婚 | | |
| 2024 | Day and Night 2 | 白夜破晓 | Guan Hongfeng/ Guan Hongyu | |
| 2026 | Light to the Night | 黑夜告白 | He Yuanhang | |

== Awards and nominations ==
| Year | Nominated work | Award | Category | Result | Ref. |
|---|---|---|---|---|---|
| 2000 | A Lingering Face | 7th Beijing College Student Film Festival | Best New Performer | Won | |
| 2001 | A Lingering Face | 8th Golden Phoenix Awards | Society Award | Won | |
| 2001 | A Love of Blueness | 21st Golden Rooster Awards | Best Actor | Nominated | |
| 2002 | A Love of Blueness | 25th Hundred Flowers Awards | Best Actor | Nominated | |
| 2002 | Desire For Fired | 9th Beijing College Student Film Festival | Best Actor (Television Film) | Won | |
| 2003 | Extreme Danger | 26th Hundred Flowers Awards | Best Actor | Nominated | |
| 2003 | Life Show | 26th Hundred Flowers Awards | Best Supporting Actor | Nominated | |
| 2003 | Stormy Sea | 9th Huabiao Awards | Outstanding New Actor | Won | |
| 2011 | Tracking Knights Phantom | 6th Huading Awards | Best Actor in Ancient Drama | Won | |
| 2018 | Day and Night | Golden Seagull International New Media Film Week | Best Actor (Web series) | Won | |
| 2018 | Day and Night | 5th The Actors of China Award Ceremony | Best Actor (Web series) | Won | |
| 2019 | Golden Bud - The Fourth Network Film And Television Festival | Best Actor | Mystery of Antiques, Unbeatable You, Candle in the Tomb: The Wrath of Time | Nominated | |
