= Last Flight (film) =

- Directed by: Vincent Zhou
- Screenplay by: Vincent Zhou; Peter Cameron
- Starring: Ed Westwick; Zhu Zhu
- Distributed by: Shanghai Media Group
- Release date: 21 March 2014
- Running time: 86 minutes
- Country: China
- Box office: US$5.9 million

Last Flight (Chinese: 绝命航班) is a 2014 Chinese supernatural action thriller film based on a novel by Singaporean novelist and actress Megan Tay. starring Ed Westwick and Zhu Zhu. The film was directed by Vincent Zhou. The screenplay was written by Vincent Zhou and Peter Cameron.

== Plot ==
Disaster awaits those traveling aboard the last red-eye flight from a secluded Pacific island. The captain and chief flight attendant fight to save their passengers from an otherworldly storm of chaos and paranoia threatening their doomed aircraft.

== Cast ==
- Ed Westwick
- Zhu Zhu
- Yin Zheng

== Reception ==
The film grossed US$5.9 million in China and remained in the nation's Top Ten for three weeks.

== Sequel ==
A sequel, Lost in the Pacific, was released on January 29, 2016.
