= Zhu Zhu =

Chinese actress (born 1984)

- 朱珠
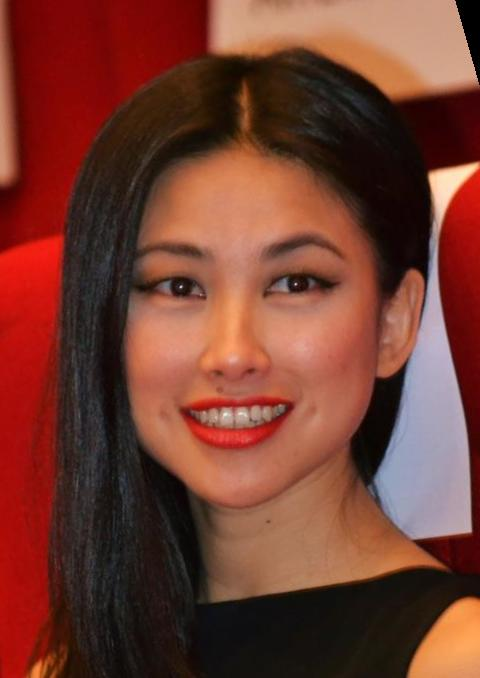
- Zhu Zhu in 2012.
- Born: 19 July 1984 (age 41); Beijing, China
- Education: Beijing Technology and Business University
- Occupations: Actress, singer, hostess
- Years active: 2005–present
- Agent: CAA
- Notable work: Cloud Atlas; What Women Want; The Man with the Iron Fists; Marco Polo
- Television: MTV China
- Children: 1

Zhu Zhu (Chinese: 朱珠; pinyin: Zhū Zhū; born 19 July 1984) is a Chinese actress and singer. She rose to fame as a VJ on MTV China.

== Early life ==
Zhu was born in a military family in Beijing on 19 July 1984, with her ancestral home in Linhai, Zhejiang, the daughter of Zhu Hanbin (朱汉斌; 朱漢斌), a Chinese businessman. Her grandfather Zhu Xuzhi (1912–2000) was a major general of the People's Liberation Army.

Zhu started to learn the piano at the age of 3. When she was a junior school student, she performed Beauty and the Beast, an English stage.

Zhu graduated from Beijing Technology and Business University, where she majored in electronics and information engineering.

== Personal life ==
Zhu was in a relationship with Italian businessman Lapo Elkann from 2012 to 2013.

On 18 March 2021, Zhu married Wang Yunjia, a lecturer at Tsinghua University's Fine Art Department. They announced the birth of their first child, a daughter named Pearl, on 2 September 2021.

== Career ==
In 2005, Zhu joined MTV China and hosted music programs on China's domestic MTV network. Zhu was discovered by talent scouts after winning a local singing contest in Beijing, then placing third at the national level.

Zhu signed with music label MBOX in 2007 and her first album was released in 2009.

In 2010, Zhu made her film debut in What Women Want, a Chinese romantic comedy film starring Andy Lau and Gong Li.

In 2012, Zhu played the character Chi Chi in an American martial arts film The Man with the Iron Fists, alongside RZA, Russell Crowe, Cung Le, Lucy Liu, Byron Mann, Rick Yune, Dave Bautista, and Jamie Chung. The film grossed million on its first day.

In 2012, Zhu participated in five films, such as Shanghai Calling, Secret Sharer, and Cloud Atlas.

In 2014, Zhu starred in a supporting role in the romantic comedy film The Old Cinderella, produced by Lu Chuan.

In 2014, Zhu played the female lead in the film Last Flight, opposite Ed Westwick and featuring Leon Lee and Cary Alexander.

In 2014, Zhu began starring in the American TV series Marco Polo which premiered on Netflix in December 2014.

In 2016, Zhu signed on for a Bollywood historical war drama film Tubelight, opposite Salman Khan. The film is directed by Kabir Khan and was released on Eid 2017. It was the first time that she was in Bollywood. She reached Mumbai on 3 August 2016 to learn Hindi as soon as possible.

On 18 March 2021, Zhu Zhu married Wang Yunjia. Wang was born in 1986 and graduated from the University of Manchester in the UK. He is the Beijing regional executive partner of a men's suit brand.

== Filmography ==
=== Film ===
Year	Title	Chinese Title	Role	Notes
2011	What Women Want	我知女人心	Xiao Wu	
2012	Shanghai Calling	纽约客@上海	Fang Fang	
2012	Cloud Atlas	云图	Megan Sixsmith / 12th Star Clone	
2012	The Man with the Iron Fists	铁拳	Chi Chi	
2014	The Old Cinderella	脱轨时代	Mao Mao	
2014	Last Flight	绝命航班	Lorain	
2014	A Bed Affair 2	床上关系2	Li Chuan	Short film
2014	Secret Sharer	秘密分享者	Li	
2015	Tales of Mystery	怪谈	Féng Xiāo	
2015	Doomed Disaster	诡劫	Coco	
2016	The Apparition	恶灵之门	Zhang Jing Ru	
2016	Kung Fu Panda 3	功夫熊猫3	Master Viper	Mandarin Dub
2017	Tubelight		Li Leing	Hindi Language film
2018	A or B	幕后玩家	Zhuang Yi	
2018	Edge of Fear		Lauren Chen	Netflix Exclusive
2019	Two/One		Jia	
2020	Confetti	五彩缤纷	Chen Lan	
2021	Knock Knock	不速来客	Li Li	
2024	Decoded	解密	Mrs. Liseiwicz	

=== Television ===
Year	Title	Chinese Title	Role	Notes
2014-2016	Marco Polo	马可·波罗	Kököchin	Netflix Series
2015	Running After Love	大猫儿追爱记	Xiao Qiao	
2019	The Best Partner	精英律师	Li Na	
2020	The Deer and the Cauldron	鹿鼎记	Su Quan	Adaptation of the novel
2020	Qin Dynasty Epic	大秦赋	Queen Dowager Zhao	
2020	My Best Friend's Story	流金岁月	Female Customer	Guest Role
2021	Douluo Continent	斗罗大陆	Bi Bi Dong	
2021	My Heroic Husband	赘婿	Lou Shu Wan	
2021	Breath of Destiny	一起深呼吸	Liang Kai Li	
2021	The Rebel	叛逆者	Lan Xin Jie	
2021	Demi-Gods and Semi-Devils	天龙八部	Kang Min	Adaptation of the novel
2021	The Bond	乔家的儿女	Ma Su Qin	
2023	Turn On the Right Way to Life	打开生活的正确方式	Dong Xiao	
2023	In Spite of the Strong Wind	纵有疾风起		Guest Role
2024	The Tale of Rose	玫瑰的故事	Jiang Xueqiong	
2026	The Epoch of Miyu	蜜语纪	Xu Miyu	

=== Variety shows ===
Year	Title	Chinese Title	Role	Notes
2015	The Amazing Race: Season 2	极速前进第二季	Cast Member	Based on the American series of the same name
2016	Race the World	非凡搭檔	Cast Member	

=== Album ===
- Zhu Zhu (朱珠)

== Awards and nominations ==
Year	Award	Category	Nominated work	Result	Ref.
2020	7th The Actors of China Award Ceremony	Best Actress (Sapphire)	—N/a	Pending	
