= Day and Night (TV series) =

- Also known as
- Traditional Chinese: 白夜追兇
- Simplified Chinese: 白夜追凶
- Hanyu Pinyin: Baíyè Zhuīxiōng
- Genre: Crime drama
- Written by: Zhiwen
- Directed by: Wang Wei
- Starring: Pan Yueming; Wang Longzheng; Liang Yuan; Lü Xiaolin; Yin Shuyi
- Opening theme: White Night by Yin Shuyi
- Ending theme: Daytime Don't Know the Darkness of Night by Pan Yueming
- Country of origin: China
- Original language: Mandarin
- No. of seasons: 1
- No. of episodes: 32

Production
- Executive producer: Yuan Yumei
- Production locations: Beijing, Dongguan, Changchun
- Running time: 45 minutes
- Production companies: Phoenix China; Youku

Original release
- Network: Youku
- Release: August 30 – September 15, 2017

Day and Night (Chinese: 白夜追凶) is a 2017 Chinese streaming television series directed by Wang Wei and written by Zhiwen. It stars Pan Yueming, Wang Longzheng, Liang Yuan, Lü Xiaolin, and Yin Shuyi. The series tells the story of Guan Hongfeng, the former captain of the Changfeng Criminal Investigation Detachment, who solves many cases to get his brother Guan Hongyu exonerated. It premiered in China via Youku starting August 30, 2017.

== Plot ==
Guan Hongfeng, a former police captain suffering from nyctophobia, returns to solving mysteries alongside the hot-tempered Captain Zhou Xun and rookie officer Zhou Shutong. However, he has a hidden agenda, which is to clear his identical twin brother Guan Hongyu's name from the alleged murder of an entire family.

== Cast ==
=== Main ===
- Pan Yueming as Guan Hongfeng, former captain of the Changfeng Criminal Investigation Detachment.
- Pan Yueming as Guan Hongyu, Guan Hongfeng's twin brother.
- Wang Longzheng as Zhou Xun, captain of the Changfeng Criminal Investigation Detachment.
- Liang Yuan as Zhou Shutong, Liu Changyong's daughter, after graduating from a Police Academy, she becomes a member of the Changfeng Criminal Investigation Detachment.
- Lü Xiaolin as Gao Yanan, legal medical expert in the Changfeng Criminal Investigation Detachment.
- Yin Shuyi as Zhao Qian, Zhou Shutong's schoolmate, a policewoman.

=== Supporting ===
- Yang Kaidi as Liu Yin, hostess of the Yinsu Bar.
- Wu Wenjing as Zhao Xincheng, vice-captain of the Seaport Detachment.
- Liu Boxi as Han Bin, an adviser in the Seaport Detachment.
- Hou Xuelong as Xiao Wang, a criminal police in the Changfeng Criminal Investigation Detachment.
- Song Naigang as Liu Changyong, Zhou Shutong's father, vice-captain of the Changfeng Criminal Investigation Detachment.
- Yue Xiaoyou as Ye Fangzhou, Zhou Shutong's former boyfriend, he used to be a criminal police officer, he has been dismissed for breach of discipline.
- Sun Jiaolong as Jin Shan, a terrorist who sells arms.
- Wang Zheng as Wang Zhige, a homicidal maniac. He is executed by shooting.
- Cao Ge as Uncle Geng.
- Sun Letian as Ji Jie.
- Sun Meiqi as Xin Yi.
- Xiao Mi as Piao Sen.
- Gao Zigang as Liu Yan.
- Ning Xiaohua as Li Chuan.
- Gao Guo as Dong Qian.
- Huang Wei as Yaoji, a drug trafficker.
- Lu Hao as Guo Peng, a fuerdai and playboy.
- Ma Wei as Ren Di, a bar singer.

== Production ==
=== Development ===
Scriptwriter Zhiwen started on the script in 2014 and worked on it for three years. Day and Night took inspiration from Insomnia, a 2002 American psychological thriller film directed by Christopher Nolan. The show's premise also bears resemblance to Nolan's 2006 film The Prestige.

=== Filming ===
Filming took place in Beijing, Dongguan, Changchun and lasted 120 days.

== Soundtrack ==
No.	Title	Lyrics	Music	Singers	Length
1.	"White Night (白夜)" (Opening theme)	Yin Shuyi	Yin Shuyi	Yin Shuyi
2.	"Daytime Don't Know the Darkness of Night (白天不懂夜的黑)" (Ending theme)	Lin Longxuan	Huang Guilan	Pan Yueming

== Reception ==
The television series received positive reviews for its complicated and tight storyline. It received 24.6 billion hits since it broadcast on Youku and scored 9.0/10 score on Douban.

== Awards and nominations ==
Year	Award	Category	Nominated work	Result	Ref.
2017	8th Macau International Television Festival	Best Web Series	Day and Night	Nominated	

== Broadcast ==
On June 16, 2017, the producers attended the 23rd Shanghai TV Festival and released a three minute trailer. On July 11, the producers released the first official poster.

Day and Night was released on August 30, 2017 in China.

=== International broadcast ===
On November 30, 2017, Netflix has acquired global rights outside mainland China to the series. The TV series will be broadcast in more than 190 countries and regions.
