= South of the Clouds (2004 film) =

- Film poster
- Traditional Chinese: 雲的南方
- Simplified Chinese: 云的南方
- Hanyu Pinyin: Yún de nán fāng
- Directed by: Zhu Wen
- Written by: Zhu Wen
- Produced by: Geng Ling; Han Sanping
- Starring: Jin Zi; Li Xuejian; Liu Changsheng; Tian Zhuangzhuang
- Cinematography: Wang Min
- Edited by: Kong Jinlei
- Music by: Zuoxiao Zuzhou
- Distributed by: China Film Assist
- Release date: February 10, 2004 (Berlin International Film Festival)
- Running time: 100 minutes
- Country: China
- Language: Mandarin

South of the Clouds is a 2004 Chinese film and the second film directed by the writer Zhu Wen. The film stands in stark contrast to Zhu's previous film. In terms of production, South of the Clouds received the cooperation of the state apparatus unlike 2001's Seafood which was an underground production shot on digital hand-held cameras. In terms of story, the transgressive tale of a prostitute and a policeman in Seafood is a far cry from South of the Cloud's gentle tale of a retiree who fulfills a lifelong desire to travel to the southern province of Yunnan (literally "South of the Clouds").

South of the Clouds stars Li Xuejian as the protagonist, Xu Daqin, and features a cameo by director Tian Zhuangzhuang as the police chief in a small town in Yunnan. It was produced by China Film Assist, an independent production company in China; South of the Clouds was the company's first production.

== Background ==
South of the Clouds was, at heart, an attempt by Zhu Wen to capture the image and beauty of Yunnan that he had experienced upon his first visit to the province. Beyond that, however, the film was an opportunity for Zhu to present his work to his home country. Following the completion of Seafood, Zhu "wanted to make something that [he] could show to [his] parents and...friends in China. Unlike Seafood, South of the Clouds did not encounter any issues with the state censors, in part because the film strictly followed all the relevant regulations.

== Awards and nominations ==
South of the Clouds like many Chinese art films was screened at numerous film festivals around the world. It succeeded in winning a FIPRESCI prize and the Firebird Award for New Cinema at the 28th Hong Kong International Film Festival. The film also won a NETPAC award at the Berlin International Film Festival in 2004.

== See also ==
- Mosuo - a matriarchal ethnic enclave in Yunnan, featured prominently in the film.
