= Chen Jieren =

Chinese journalist, editor and blogger

Chen Jieren (Chinese: 陈杰人; pinyin: Chén Jiérén, born 1972) is a Chinese journalist, editor and blogger. In 2012, he was described by The Economist as "a well-known commentator in Beijing on legal affairs" and in 2015, New York Times called him a "a well-known Beijing-based commentator on politics". In 2020 he was sentenced to 15 years in prison after accusing local Communist Party officials of corruption.

== Early life and education ==
Chen Jieren was born to a peasant family. He graduated from the Law School of Tsinghua University in 2001.

== Career ==
Chen Jieren worked as a journalist and editor for Chinese state media, including the Southern Weekend, China Youth Daily, Beijing Daily and the People's Daily. He has been fired from many outlets (from China Youth Daily in 2003, from China Philanthropy Times in 2005, from The Public Interest Times in 2006, and from People's Daily in 2011) for reporting on controversial scandals and criticism of the government.

His 2003 report on prostitution in China by university students, to pay for their tuition fees, is said to have sparked a country-wide debate about the issue. Later he started his own blog focused on anti-corruption activism and was known to be critical of party officials. He also posted online reports on the Chinese microblogging platforms like WeChat.

=== Arrest ===
The blogging activities, particularly his posts about alleged corruption by Communist Party officials in Hunan, led to his arrest in 2018, and in 2020 after about two years of being kept in isolation he received a sentence of 15 years of imprisonment and a fine of 7 million yuan for "picking quarrels and provoking trouble, extortion, blackmail and bribery". His brother was also arrested on related charges and sentenced to four years of imprisonment. Chinese state media reported that Chen Jieren has “sabotaged the reputation of the party and the government and damaged the government’s credibility”. Their sentence has been criticized by the human rights NGO Chinese Human Rights Defenders which stated that they did not receive a fair trial, that their right to free expression has been violated, and that their sentence is politically motivated. Polish newspaper Gazeta Wyborcza described his sentence as "draconian - even for China". A number of media outlets noted that the charge of “picking quarrels and provoking trouble” is a "catch-all" term that Chinese authorities often use against people who are critical of the government.
