= A Lingering Face =

- Film poster
- Traditional Chinese: 非常夏日
- Simplified Chinese: 非常夏日
- Hanyu Pinyin: Fēicháng xiàrì
- Directed by: Lu Xuechang
- Written by: Lu Xuechang; Li Jixian
- Produced by: Han Sanping; Tong Gang; Cao Wei; Tian Yuping
- Starring: Ma Xiaoqing; Pan Yueming; Li Min; Ge Yaming; He Xi; Cheng Lianzhong; Shi Xiaojun; Gao Xilu
- Cinematography: Wang Yu
- Edited by: Kong Leijin
- Music by: Nathan McCree
- Distributed by: China Film Group
- Release date: August 3, 2000 (Locarno)
- Running time: 94 minutes
- Country: China
- Language: Mandarin

A Lingering Face (Chinese: 非常夏日; pinyin: Fēicháng xiàrì; lit. 'A curious summer day') is a 2000 Chinese film directed by Lu Xuechang. The film is Lu's second after 1997's The Making of Steel. Compared to that earlier film, which was plagued with censorship problems, A Lingering Face's production and release was relatively free of problems or obstacles.

== Plot ==
A Lingering Face follows an everyman named Lei Haiyang (Pan Yueming), who has recently broken up with his girlfriend. Deciding to go to Beijing, he hitches a ride with a driver (Li Min) and a fellow hitchhiker, Yanzi (Ma Xiaoqing). Waking up from a nap, Haiyang finds the truck parked in the woods and the driver raping Yanzi. Hiding in the undergrowth, Yanzi sees Haiyang (the titular "lingering" face), but does not reveal his hiding position. Terrified, Haiyang runs away.

In Beijing, Haiyang sees a news report of a female corpse found in the woods. Later, while walking in the streets, Haiyang chances upon a woman who looks exactly like Yanzi. She denies it, but the two embark on a friendship which blossoms into romance. Soon, Haiyang will discover what happened on that curious summer day.

== Reception ==
In his review of A Lingering Face for Variety, Derek Elley commented: ... "Set in average, non-touristy Beijing locations, ... the movie has a genuinely offbeat character, without any heavy underlining or condescending to the viewer. Script keeps several well-drawn characters ... on the boil throughout, and the plot continues to spring surprises right to the very end".

== See also ==
- Suzhou River and Lunar Eclipse, two contemporary Chinese films that also deal with plots involving the double identities of women.
