= Zhang Jingchu =

Chinese actress

- 张静初
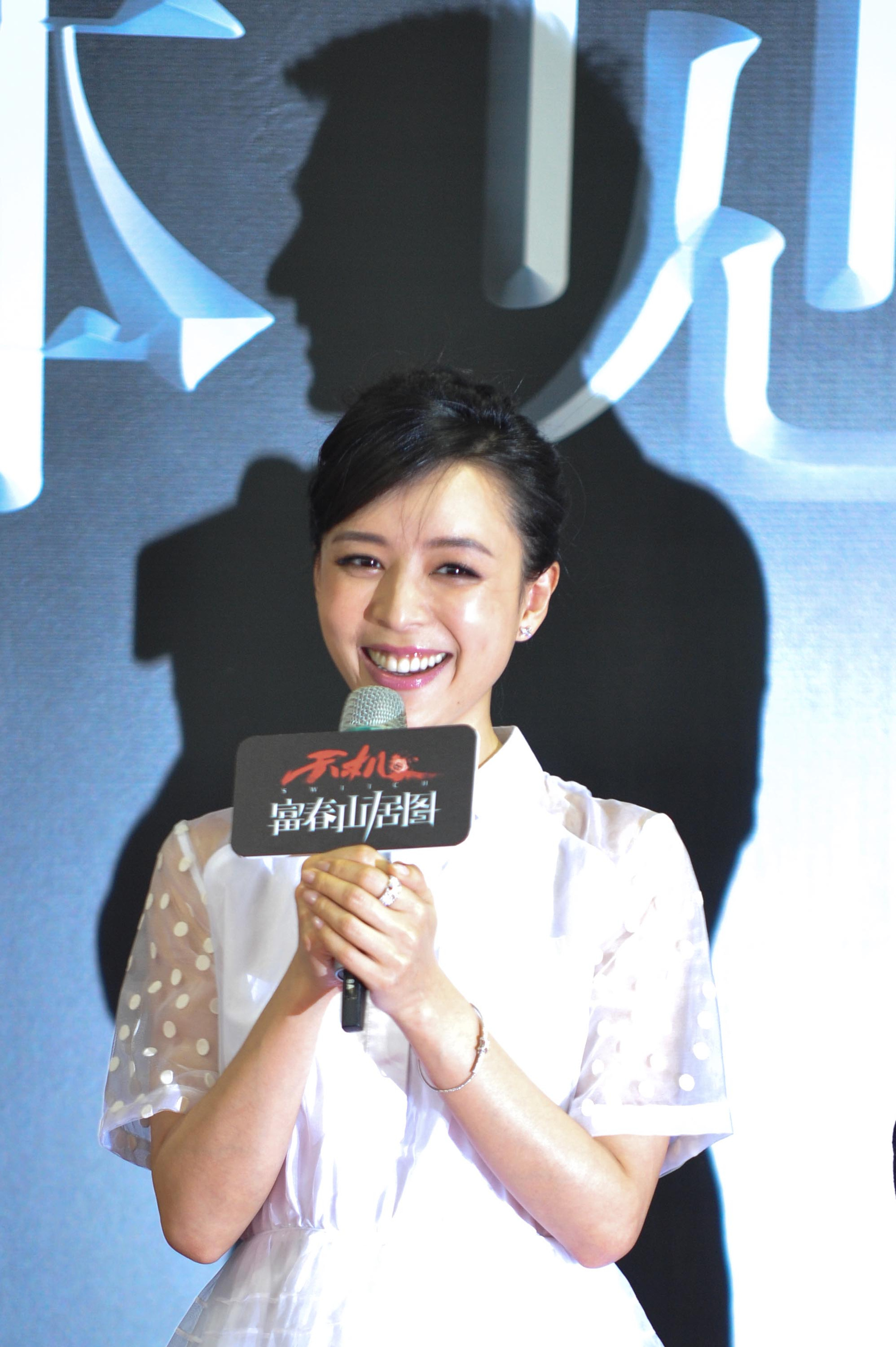
- Zhang in 2013
- Born: Zhang Jingchu (張靜初); 2 February 1980 (age 46); Yong'an, Fujian, China
- Other names: Jingchu Zhang, Xiao Jingchu
- Education: Central Academy of Drama
- Occupation: Actress
- Years active: 2002–present

Zhang Jingchu (Chinese: 张静初; pinyin: Zhāng jìngchū, born 2 February 1980) is a Chinese actress. She first gained recognition for the film Peacock (2005), which won the Silver Bear Grand Jury Prize at the Berlin International Film Festival. Zhang is also known for her roles in the films Protégé (2007), Red River (2009), and Aftershock (2010).

== Early life ==
Zhang was born on 2 February 1980 in Fujian, China. Zhang was brought up in a middle-class family in the countryside.

== Education ==
Zhang studied English in Beijing New Oriental Institute, a private language educational school in Beijing, China. Zhang graduated in Directing from Central Academy of Drama in Beijing, China.

In March 2023, she was admitted to the Master of Fine Arts programme at the American Film Institute.

== Career ==
Zhang's acting career began in both film and television in 2000. In 2005, she transitioned into an international films. Zhang came into international prominence through director Gu Changwei's debut film Peacock, which won the Silver Bear at the 2005 Berlin International Film Festival. She was picked from 1,000 applicants for her role as a petulant, conniving homebound daughter who tries to chart her own course in life. Following which, she got a role in Tsui Hark's martial arts film Seven Swords, which opened the Venice Film Festival in August 2005.

Zhang shed her gentle and quiet image to play the rebellious and gutsy protagonist in Huayao Bride in Shangri-la (2005), and won the Beijing College Student Film Festival for Best Actress. She was named one of "Asia's Heroes" by Time magazine.

In 2006, Zhang was cast as the tough-talking heroine in the Finnish-Chinese kungfu movie Jade Warrior, directed by A. J. Annila. The same year, she starred in romantic drama The Road directed by Lu Chuan. Zhang won over the audience with the maturity she shows in her acting, and her extraordinary ability to touch hearts by interpreting the different stages of a Chinese woman's life. She won the Best Actress award at the 30th Cairo International Film Festival.

Zhang then starred in Derek Yee's drug smuggling film Protégé (2007). Her portrayal of a woman who is forced to struggle between drug addiction and herself won praises from both the audience and critics. The same year, she made her Hollywood film debut in Rush Hour 3 alongside Jackie Chan.

Zhang worked with German director Florian Gallenberger in the film John Rabe (2008), where she plays a college student whose family suffers in the Japanese invasion of Nanjing.

She then starred in Ann Hui's film Night and Fog, a social commentary film which sheds light on new immigrants to Hong Kong. Her portrayal of the protagonist Ling, a woman who struggles with an abusive husband won rave reviews from critics and was described as a "turning point" in her career. The same year, she starred in Red River where she played a mentally-challenged Vietnamese girl.

Zhang next starred in Feng Xiaogang's disaster film Aftershock (2010), playing a girl who separates from her mother after the Tangshan earthquake and becomes a rescue worker. Zhang also takes part in earthquake relief efforts in real life. She is the ambassador of the charity SiyuanAOC Rainbow Plan, founded by China Siyuan Foundation for Poverty Alleviation and AOC Monitor.

Zhang then took a six-month break from the entertainment industry, stating that she was disappointed by the commercial nature of her recent roles. During this time, she served as a jury member at the Shanghai International Film Festival. She returned to the screen in the romantic comedy Laucana (2012) co-starring Shawn Yue.

In 2013, she starred in the action thriller Switch alongside Andy Lau. She also starred in the Italian film The Mercury Factor alongside Luca Barbareschi. In April 2013, Zhang was on location in Jerusalem, where she starred in The Old Cinderella. Since China and Israel established diplomatic relations, this was the first joint film project. Zhang next featured in Mission: Impossible – Rogue Nation (2015). The same year, she was cast in the film adaptation of the best-selling novel, The Three-Body Problem.

In 2017, Zhang was cast in the thriller film Once Upon a Time in Northeast China; as well as crime action film Wings Over Everest.

== Filmography ==
=== Film ===
Year	English title	Chinese title	Role	Notes/Ref.
2000	Affection Double Days	情义两重天	Mengmeng	
2003	Suo Miya's Choice	索密娅的抉择	Suo Miya	
2005	Peacock	孔雀	Sister	
2005	Huayao Bride in Shangri-la	花腰新娘	Fengmei	
2005	Seven Swords	七剑	Liu Yufang	
2005	Seven Nights	七夜	Gui	
2006	The Road	芳香之旅	Li Chunfang	
2006	Jade Warrior	玉戰士	Pinyu	
2007	Protégé	門徒	Jane	
2007	Rush Hour 3	尖峰時刻3	Soo Yung Han	
2008	Beast Stalker	证人	Ann Gao	
2009	Red River	红河	Tao	
2009	John Rabe	拉貝日记	Langshu	
2009	Night and Fog	天水圍的夜与霧	Wong Hiu-ling	
2009	Overheard	窃听风云	Mandy Yam	
2010	The Double Life	A面B面	Liu Yue	
2010	Flirting Scholar 2	唐伯虎點秋香2之四大才子	Qiuxiang	
2010	Aftershock	唐山大地震	Fang Deng / Wang Deng	
2010	City Under Siege	全城戒備	Xiuhua	
2011	The Man Behind the Courtyard House	守望者：罪惡迷途	Hong	
2011	The Law of Attraction	萬有引力	Xuelian	
2012	Lacuna	醉後一夜	Tong Xin	
2012	Casino Moon	賭城月色	Casino dealer	Short film
2013	Switch	天机·富春山居图	Lin Yuyan	
2013	Running Shadows	我的影子在奔跑	Tian Jiafang	
2013	The Mercury Factor	危情黑吃黑	Jiazhen	
2014	The Old Cinderella	脱軌時代	Xu Ke	
2015	Mission: Impossible – Rogue Nation	碟中諜5	Lauren	
2015	I Am Somebody	我是路人甲		Cameo
2016	Murder at Honeymoon Hotel	蜜月酒店殺人事件	Pei Er	
2016	For a Few Bullets	快手枪手快枪手	Li Ruoyun	
2016	Sky on Fire	沖天火	Gao Yu	
2017	The Adventurers	俠盜聯盟	Amber	
2018	Project Gutenberg	无双	Yuan Wen	
2018	Miss Puff	泡芙小姐		Cameo
2019	Love Song to the Days Forgone	东北往事之二十年	Cui Zhu	
2019	Wings Over Everest	冰峰暴		
TBA	The Three-Body Problem	三体	Ye Wenjie	

=== Television series ===
Year	English title	Chinese title	Role	Ref.
2000	Sword Master	三少爷的剑	Zhu Qianqian	
2001	Qin Shi Huang	秦始皇	Princess Mindai	
2001	Love Dictionary	爱情宝典	Zhan Shujuan	
2001	The Great Love in Your Life	你的生命如此多情	Yan Yu	
2001		不回家的男人	Lu Tong	
2002	The Cricket Master	蟋蟀大師	Xiaocui	
2002	Imperial Guards	英雄	Ye Min	
2005	Purple Jade and Gold Sand	紫玉金砂	Pan Lingyu	
2006	The 36th Chamber of Shaolin	南少林三十六房	Li Menglin	
2016	Let's Fall in Love	咱们相爱吧	Lin Xiaoxiao	
2016	Huajinghu 2	画江湖之不良人2	Empress	
2020	Together	在一起		
2021	Vacation of Love	假日暖洋洋	Song Xiaoke	
2023	The Long Season	漫长的季节	Shen Mo (Older)	

== Awards ==
Year	Award	Category	Nominated work	Ref.
2005	12th Beijing College Student Film Festival	Best Actress	Huayao Bride in Shangri-la	
2005	11th Huabiao Awards	Outstanding New Actress	Huayao Bride in Shangri-la	
2005	14th Shanghai Film Critics Awards	Best Actress	Peacock	
2006	6th Chinese Film Media Awards	Best Actress	Peacock	
2006	30th Cairo International Film Festival	Best Actress	The Road	
2009	16th Beijing College Student Film Festival	Students' Choice Award for Favorite Actress	Red River	
2013	5th China Image Film Festival	Best Supporting Actress	Switch	
2016	3rd Jackie Chan Action Movie Awards	Best Action Movie Actress	For a Few Bullets	
