= Pan Suiming =

Chinese sexologist and professor

- 潘绥铭
- Born: 1950 (age 75–76); China
- Education: Northeast Normal University
- Occupations: Sexologist, professor
- Years active: 1984–present
- Organization: Chinese Sociological Association

Chinese name
- Traditional Chinese: 潘綏銘
- Simplified Chinese: 潘绥铭
Transcriptions
Standard Mandarin
- Hanyu Pinyin: Pān Suímíng

Pan Suiming (Chinese: 潘绥铭; born 1950) is a Chinese sexologist and professor at the Renmin University of China who has taught sexology for more than 30 years. He is hailed as "the First Person in Sexology in China".

== Early life ==
Pan was born in 1950 to an official family. At the age of 9, his father was classified as right winger and suffered unfair treatment. In 1966, Mao Zedong launched the ten-year Cultural Revolution, Pan became a sent-down youth at a state farm in Heilongjiang province.

== Education ==
Pan attended Northeast Normal University, where he majored in history.

== Career ==
Pan was assigned to the Renmin University of China as a teacher. In 1985 he began to teach sexual sociology.

Pan's first book, Mysterious Fire: Sociological History of Sex, was published in 1988. He founded the Institute for Research on Sexuality and Gender at the Renmin University in 1991. He was a visiting scholar at the University of Michigan (1993–1993) and University of Wales (1994–1995).

He is one of the pioneers in researching and teaching sexology in China and a published author.

== Works ==
- 神秘的圣火：性的社会史 [Mysterious Fire: Sociological History of Sex] (in Chinese). Zhengzhou, Henan: Henan People's Publishing House. 1988.
- 世界性文化图考 [World Sex Culture] (in Chinese). Beijing: China Youth Publishing House. 2013. ISBN 9787515316475.
- Pan Suiming; Huang Yingying (2017). 我在现场：性社会学田野调查笔记 [I'm on the Spot: A Field Survey Note on Sex Sociology] (in Chinese). Taiyuan, Shanxi: Shanxi People's Publishing House. ISBN 9787203099512.
- Pan Suiming; Huang Yingying (213). 性之变：21世纪中国人的性生活 [Sexual Change: Sexual Life of Chinese in the 21st Century] (in Chinese). Beijing: Renmin University of China Press. ISBN 9787300163741.

== Translations ==
- Alfred C. Kinsey (2013). KINSEY: Sexual Behaviour in Human Male (in Chinese). Beijing: China Youth Publishing House. ISBN 9787515316475.
- Sex in America (in Chinese). Xi'an, Shaanxi: Shaanxi People's Publishing House. 1995.

== Papers ==
- "Relationship between Sexual Behavior and Sexual Conceptions among the Married People in 27 Chinese Cities". Hong Kong: Declared in the Conference of Sex Research in Asian and Pacific Areas. 1992.
- "Misconceptions of Oldest Profession". Social. USA. 1992.
- "Quantitative Behavioral Analysis of Public Heterosexual Petting in Chinese Civil Parks". Sexuality in Asia. Hong Kong: Hong Kong College of Psychiatrists: 173–185. 1993.
- Pan, Sui-Ming (1993). "China: Acceptability and Effect of Three Kinds of Sexual Publications". Archives of Sexual Behavior. 22 (1). USA: 59–71. doi:10.1007/BF01552913. PMID 8435040. S2CID 11239273.
- "Chinese Wives: Factors Underlying Their Orgasm Frequencies". Miami Beach, USA: Declared in the Conference of Gender Issues in Chinese Societies. 1993.
- Pan, Suiming (1993). "A Sex Revolution in Current China". Psychology & Human Sexuality. 6 (2). USA: 1–14. doi:10.1300/j056v06n02_01.
- "The Scripts and Changes of Chinese Traditional Culture on Sexuality". Global Bioethics. 2–3. Italy: 132–149. 1994.
- Pan, Suiming; Wu, Zongjian; Gil, Vincent E. (1995). "Homosexual Behaviors in Contemporary China". Psychology & Human Sexuality. 7 (4). USA: 1–17. doi:10.1300/j056v07n04_01.
- "Male Homosexual Behavior and HIV-related Risk in China". Bisexualities and Aids: International Perspectives. London, UK: Taylor & Francis Group Ltd.: 178–190 1995.
- "Sexuality and Gender: Background and Researches in China". Cebu, Philippines: Declared in the Conference of Sexuality, Gender and Reproduction, Asian & Pacific Areas. 1995.
- Renaud, Cheryl; Byers, E. Sandra; Pan, Suiming (1997). "Sexual and Relationship Satisfaction in Mainland China". The Journal of Sex Research. 34 (4). USA: 399–410. doi:10.1080/00224499709551907.
