= Jin Ze =

Chinese actor and model (1993–2026)

Jin Ze (Chinese: 张家玮; January 30, 1993 – June 4, 2026) was a Chinese model and actor.

== Life and career ==
Jin Ze was on born in Weihai on January 30, 1993. He graduated from the Department of Art and Design of Beijing Fashion College.

In 2019, he starred in a number of television series, including "Hello Qiao An". and “Seeing your voice”. He also appeared in “Fierce Street Basketball” (2017).

Jin died on June 4, 2026, at the age of 33.
