= Rain Clouds over Wushan =

Rain Clouds Over Wushan
- Traditional Chinese: 巫山雲雨
- Simplified Chinese: 巫山云雨
- Hanyu Pinyin: Wū shān yún yǔ
- Directed by: Zhang Ming
- Written by: Zhu Wen
- Produced by: Han Sanping; Huang Yunkai; Tian Zhuangzhuang
- Starring: Zhang Xianming; Zhong Ping; Wang Wenqiang
- Cinematography: Ding Jiancheng; Zhou Ming; Yao Xiaofeng
- Edited by: Wang Qiang; Zhou Ying
- Music by: Liu Feng
- Production company: Beijing Film Studio
- Release date: 1995
- Running time: 96 minutes
- Country: China
- Language: Mandarin

Rain Clouds over Wushan (Chinese: 巫山云雨; pinyin: Wū shān yún yǔ) (also known as In Expectation) is a 1995 Chinese film directed by Zhang Ming and written by Zhu Wen. The film follows the lives of two lonely people living in Wushan on the banks of the Yangtze River during the construction of the Three Gorges Dam.

The satirical portrayal of rural life is considered part of the sixth generation movement that began in the early 1990s. Unlike many other films of the movement, however, Rain Clouds over Wushan was produced with help from the state-run Beijing Film Studio.

== Plot ==
Mai Qiang is a 30-year old bachelor, withdrawn, with little in his life besides his job at an isolated signal station along the Yangtze River and his ink drawings he uses as toilet paper. Chen Qing is a hotel clerk, a widow with a young child and an undemanding relationship with her boss Lao Mo. Lao believes she has been raped, so he reports the crime to Wu Gang, the neighborhood cop. Wu investigates, but Chen is uncooperative. Lao then identifies Mai, who is detained and questioned. After Wu gets to the truth of the incident, Mai tries to break out of his loneliness and connect to Chen.

== Reception ==
Since its release in 1996, Rainclouds over Wushan has slowly gained a reputation as a key film in the sixth generation movement of Chinese cinema. It was, for example, part of a retrospective by the Harvard Film Archive as part of its retrospective on the so-called "Urban Generation" in 2001. It was also screened at other retrospectives throughout the United States, including the UCLA Film Archive's 2000 "New Chinese Cinema: Tales of Urban Delight, Alienation and the Margins" retrospective.

Internationally, the film was screened at several film festivals, notably winning a Dragons and Tigers Award from the Vancouver International Film Festival in 1997, an honor it shared with the South Korean film, The Day a Pig Fell Into the Well. Additionally the film won a FIPRESCI prize at the Torino Film Festival, as well as the Best Feature Film award.
