= Lu Xuechang =

Chinese film director

- Born: June 25, 1964; Beijing, China
- Died: February 20, 2014 (aged 49)
- Occupation: Film director
- Years active: 1990s–2014

Chinese name
- Traditional Chinese: 路學長
- Simplified Chinese: 路学长
Transcriptions
Standard Mandarin
- Hanyu Pinyin: Lù Xuécháng

Lu Xuechang (June 25, 1964 – February 20, 2014) was a sixth generation Chinese film director. One of a new crop of talented filmmakers, Lu directed four feature films beginning with his debut, The Making of Steel in 1997.

Like many of his present-day peers, critics have seen elements of foreign filmmakers in Lu's work, with Lu himself claiming to enjoy Italian cinema (although he stops short of naming specific influences). Also commensurate with his peers, Lu had his share of run-ins with the censors. The Making of Steel, for example, was recut six times before it was allowed to be screened.

== Filmography ==
Year	English Title	Chinese Title	Notes
1997	The Making of Steel	长大成人	
2000	A Lingering Face	非常夏日	
2003	Cala, My Dog!	卡拉是条狗	
2006	Lease Wife	租期	Also known as The Contract
2008	Under One Roof	两个人的房间	
