= Zhu Wen (writer) =

Chinese film director (1967-)

Zhu Wen (Chinese: 朱文; pinyin: Zhū Wén; Pe̍h-ōe-jī: Chu Bûn; born 1967) is a Chinese short story writer turned director.

== Early life and writing ==
Zhu Wen was born in 1967 in Quanzhou City, Fujian Province. He attended Southeast University in Nanjing, and graduated with a degree in electric power. After working as an engineer in a state-owned thermal power plant for five years, he quit his job in 1994 to become a freelance writer. His first published short story, I Love Dollars, was denounced by some critics as the "shameless and indecent novel of a hooligan."

In 1998, he instigated and became identified with the Rupture (duanlie) movement to voice dissatisfaction with the literary establishment. He sent questionnaires to about 70 writers, about 55 of which responded. The responses were sarcastic and mostly expressed discontent, and later spawned publications that nurtured more independence among writers.

In an introduction to Zhu Wen's short stories, translator Julia Lovell characterized his 'trademark narrative style' as "a loosely punctuated, first-person voice in which speech, both direct and indirect, run on within sentences of descriptive prose, designed to capture the unceremonious, free-flowing rhythms of action and dialogue in contemporary China." As a writer, he was labelled as part of a 'newly-born generation' (xinshengdai) movement.

He began writing short stories and novellas in 1991. He has written the following novellas:

- I Love Dollars《我爱美元》(1994)
- A Boat Crossing《三生修得同舟渡》 (1995)
- A Hospital Night 《幸亏这些年有了一点钱》 (1996)
- Wheels 《把穷人统统打昏》 (1998)
- Ah, Xiao Xie《小谢啊小谢》(1999)
- 《因为孤独》
- 《弟弟的演奏》
- 《人民到底需不需要桑拿》
- 《大汗淋漓》

His only novel-length work is What is Garbage, What is Love. (什么是拉圾，什么是爱).

A selection of his short stories were translated by Julia Lovell and published by Columbia University Press in January 2007.

== Directorial career ==
Zhu decided to direct a movie in 2000. He has said that most of the directors he admires come from Continental Europe and Russia, including Andrei Tarkovsky.

He is considered a member of the Sixth Generation of Chinese film makers. His first movie was Seafood (海鲜), about a policeman and prostitute's friendship in Beidaihe. It won the Grand Jury Prize at the 58th Venice Film Festival. It cost about 300,000RMB to produce.

His second film, South of the Clouds (云的南方), was awarded the NETPAC (Network for Promotion of Asian Films) Prize at the Berlin Film Festival and won 'Asia's Best New Director Prize' at the Shanghai International Film Festival, sharing the prize and half of the 150,000RMB prize with a Thai director. He explained the title referred to desires that cannot be fulfilled. It cost about 100,000RMB to produce.

Zhu has also been highly critical of some of the Fifth Generation of Chinese directors, saying of Zhang Yimou and Chen Kaige, "They're successful directors, but they're not good directors."

=== Filmography ===
- Director

| Year | English Title | Chinese Title | Notes |
|---|---|---|---|
| 2001 | Seafood | 海鲜 | |
| 2004 | South of the Clouds | 云的南方 | |

- Screenwriter

| Year | English Title | Chinese Title | Director |
|---|---|---|---|
| 1996 | Rain Clouds over Wushan | 巫山云雨 | Zhang Ming |
| 1999 | Seventeen Years | 过年回家 | Zhang Yuan |
| 2001 | Seafood | 海鲜 | Zhu Wen |
