= Chunyan Awards =

Biannual event held in Beijing, China

- Native name: 春燕奖
- Description: Recognition for exceptional achievement in Chinese film and/or television
- Country: China (Beijing)
- Presented by: Beijing Film and Television Association

The Chunyan Awards (Chinese: 春燕奖) is a biannual event in Beijing, China, hosted by the Beijing Film and Television Association, a subsidiary of the Beijing Municipal Bureau of Press, Print, Radio, Film and Television. Recipients are recognized for their "exceptional achievement in Chinese film and/or television". The event has been held since 1991. Originally, there were only television categories of the event, but film categories have been added in 2010.

== Chunyan Film Award ==
Year	Best Picture	Best Director	Best Screenplay	Best Actor	Best Actress	Best Supporting Actor	Best Supporting Actress
2013	Tie Ren	Gu Changwei for Love for Life	Dong Zhe/Guo Junli/Huang Xin for Beginning of the Great Revival	Li Xuejian for Yang Shanzhou	Zhang Ziyi for Love for Life	Xu Jian for Jing Tian Dong Di	Tao Hong for Yang Shanzhou
2010	A Postman in Shangri-la	Feng Xiaogang for Assembly	Li Qiang for The Postmodern Life of My Aunt	Stephen Chow for CJ 7	Zhao Wei for Painted Skin	Hou Yong for 1 August	Song Jia for Curiosity Kills the Cat

== Chunyan Television Award ==
Year	Best Television Series	Best Director	Best Screenplay	Best Actor	Best Actress	Best Supporting Actor	Best Supporting Actress
2015 (18th)	Mu Fu Fengyun	Liu Jiang for Let's Get Married	Chen Yan for To Elderly with Love	Ma Shaohua for Deng Xiaoping at History's Crossroads	Gao Yuanyuan for Let's Get Married	Fan Ming for We Love You, Mr. Jin	Liu Pei for To Elderly with Love
2013	Beautiful Daughter-in-Law	Zheng Xiaolong for Empresses in the Palace	Quan Yongxian for The Cliff	Chen Baoguo for Zhi Zhe Wu Di	Song Dandan for Li Chuntian in Spring	Liu Peiqi for Women in Village	Sa Rina for Shou Wang De Tian Kong
2010	Golden Marriage	Zheng Xiaolong for Golden Marriage	Gao Mantang for North Wind Blowing	Zhang Guoli for Golden Marriage	Yan Ni for Bei Feng Na Ge Chui	Liang Guanhua for Xing Huo	Ma Su for North Wind Blowing
2008	unknown	Gao Xixi for Sky of History	unknown	Liu Yunlong for An Suan	unknown	unknown	Yang Qun for Tai Zu Mi Shi
2005	Dangours Journey	Zhao Baogang/Wang Jun for Vancouver	Liu Heng for Young Emperor	Chen Kun for Vancouver	Betty Sun for Goddess of Mercy	Li Jianyi for Young Emperor	Li Xiaoran for Vancouver
2004	Xiao Zhuang Mi Shi	You Xiaogang for Xiao Zhuang Mi Shi	Hai Yan for Na Shen Me Zheng Jiu Ni, Wo De Ai Ren	Shen Junyi for Sheng Si Tui Bian	Ning Jing for Xiao Zhuang Mi Shi	Zhang Chao for Sheng Si Tui Bian	Wu Qianqian for Xiao Zhuang Mi Shi
2002	Never Give Up	unknown	unknown	Li Chengru for The VI Group of Fatal Case	Li Yingqiu for Da Qing Yao Wang	Li Baoqian for Da Qing Yao Wang	Da Jiaoqian for Unusual Touch
2001	Tai Yang Bu Luo Shan	Yin Li for Witness	Li Qing/Xiao Ya/Cao Lining for Shen Bian De Ri Zi	unknown	Wang Ji for Witness	unknown	Song Chunli for Witness
2000	Pin Zui Zhang Da Min De Xing Fu Sheng Huo	Zheng Xiaolong/An Zhanjun for Yi Nian You Yi Nian	Liu Heng for Pin Zui Zhang Da Min De Xing Fu Sheng Huo	Liang Guanhua for Pin Zui Zhang Da Min De Xing Fu Sheng Huo	Zhu Yuanyuan for Pin Zui Zhang Da Min De Xing Fu Sheng Huo	unknown	Xu Xiulin for Xiao Zhuang Mi Shi
1999	unknown	You Xiaogang for Bankers	unknown	Zhou Lijing for The Legend of Shang Yang	Wu Qianqian for Bankers	Zhang Guoli for A Tale of Liu Li Chang	Gai Lili for Bankers

== See also ==
- List of Asian television awards
