= Dong Xuan (actress) =

- 董璇
- Born: November 5, 1979 (age 46); Mudanjiang, Heilongjiang, China
- Other name: Michelle Dong
- Education: Shenyang Conservatory of Music; Beijing Film Academy
- Occupations: Actress; singer
- Years active: 2003–present
- Agent(s): Huayi Brothers; Yichuan Media
- Spouse: Gao Yunxiang (m. 2011–2019)
- Children: 1
- Musical career
- Genre: Mandopop

Dong Xuan (Chinese: 董璇; pinyin: Dǒng Xuán; born 5 November 1979), also known as Michelle Dong, is a Chinese actress known for her roles in the TV series Xuehua Nüshenlong (2003), Spring Flower and Autumn Moon (2014), Eight Heroes (2008), Amazing Detective Di Renjie 3 (2008), The Legend of Crazy Monk (2010), The Young Lawyer Ji Xiaolan (2012), and Secret of the Three Kingdoms (2018). She is also known for the film And the Spring Comes (2007).

== Early life and education ==
Dong was born in Mudanjiang, Heilongjiang, on November 5, 1982. She began taking piano lessons, violin lessons and dance lessons in her early teens. In 1995 she entered Shenyang Conservatory of Music, majoring in dancing. In 2000 she was accepted to Beijing Film Academy.

== Acting career ==
Dong made her screen debut with a supporting role as Shangguan Yan in Xuehua Nüshenlong (2003).

In 2004, Dong starred opposite Steve Ma in period drama Spring Flower and Autumn Moon.

In 2006, Dong was cast in the historical drama Struggle For Imperial Power. She then starred in modern drama A Gentleman's Good Mate.

In 2008, Dong played one of the lead roles in wuxia drama in Eight Heroes. She then appeared in Amazing Detective Di Renjie 3, a suspense television series. The same year, she made her film debut with a supporting role in And the Spring Comes, for which she received Best Supporting Actress nomination at the 27th Golden Rooster Awards.

In 2009, Dong joined the main cast of historical drama Guandong Adventure. She then made a cameo appearance in patriotic film The Founding of a Republic. Dong had a key supporting role in the historical comedy television series A Legend of Shaolin Kung Fu the same year as Ji Xiaolan's love interest.

In 2010, Dong played a supporting role in the shenmo television series The Legend of Crazy Monk. That same year, she starred alongside Du Chun in romance drama Puberty hit Menopause.

In 2011, Dong was cast in her first leading role in the youth film Struggle with Li Chen. In August, she starred in the suspense romance television series Unbeatable. At that same year, she made a guest appearance as Xiang Jingyu on The Founding of a Party.

In 2014, Dong played the role of the founder of Gumu Sect Lin Zhaoying in The Romance of the Condor Heroes, adapted from Jin Yong's wuxia novel The Return of the Condor Heroes.

In 2018, Dong played Diaochan in the historical drama Secret of the Three Kingdoms.

== Personal life ==
Dong met Gao Yunxiang in 2009. They married in Beijing on August 21, 2011. Their daughter, nicknamed Xiao Jiuwo (Chinese: 小酒窝), was born on June 2, 2016. They divorced in March 2019.

Dong married actor Zhang Weiyi in 2025.

== Filmography ==
=== Film ===
Year	English title	Chinese title	Role	Notes/Ref.
2008	And the Spring Comes	立春	Teacher Zhang	
2008	Colorful Marathon	七彩马拉松	Xu Yan	
2009	The Founding of a Republic	建国大业		Cameo
2010	Love is Not in the Service Area	爱情不在服务区	Wen Lu	
2011	Struggle	奋斗	Xia Lin	
2011	The Founding of a Party	建党伟业	Xiang Jingyu	
2011	Great Wall My Love	追爱	Mu Tong	
2014	Breaking the Waves	激浪青春	Yao Yao	
2015	Wild Desert	心跳戈壁	Tong Ge	
2019	The Lethe	忘川茶舍之兽神诅咒	Liu Sheng	also producer
2020	Ladies In Beijing	北京女子图鉴之整容大师	Chen Yuanyuan	
2020	The Lethe II	忘川茶舍之铸剑祭魂	Liu Sheng	
2021	Lost Soul	双面妖姬	Liu Sheng	
2021	Unstoppable	愤怒的黄牛	Tana	

=== Television series ===
Year	English title	Chinese title	Role	Notes/Ref.
2003	Xuehua Nüshenlong	雪花女神龙	Shangguan Yan	
2003	Goddess of Mercy	玉观音		Cameo
2004	Black Eyes	黑眼睛	Zhou Mingfeng	
2004	Spring Flower and Autumn Moon	春花秋月	Hou Lili	
2005	Struggle For Imperial Power	大宋奇案	Li Yu	
2005	Eight Heroes	八大豪侠	Bian Suwen	
2007	A Gentleman's Good Mate	君子好逑	Shui Bingxin	
2007	Cotton Flower's Spring	木棉花的春天	Fang Ruhan	
2008	Amazing Detective Di Renjie 3	神探狄仁杰3	Aunt Yun	
2008	The So-called Marriage	所谓婚姻	Meng Feifei	
2009	A Legend of Shaolin Kung Fu	少年讼师纪晓岚	Qing'er	
2009	Guandong Adventure	闯关东	Song Tianyue	
2010	My Sassy Wife Xu Xiaomei	刁蛮娇妻苏小妹	Su Xiaomei	
2010	The Legend of Crazy Monk	活佛济公	Xiao Zhenzhu	
2010	Unbeatable	无懈可击之美女如云	Ma Jiali	
2010	Puberty hit Menopause	青春期撞上更年期	Bai Xiao'ou	
2011	How Can I Save You, My Love	新拿什么拯救你我的爱人	Zhu Siping	
2011	Strangers When We Meet	相逢何必曾相识	Li Qiuling	
2011	Unbeatable	无懈可击之高手如林	Feng Lufei	
2012	Beijing Love Story	北京爱情故事	A beautiful woman	Cameo
2012	My Mother-in-law is also My Mother	婆婆也是妈	Ma Ke	
2014	Stories of My Grandpa and Grandma	我爷爷和奶奶的故事	Lan Ying	
2014	The Romance of the Condor Heroes	神雕侠侣	Lin Chaoying	
2018	Secret of the Three Kingdoms	三国机密之潜龙在渊	Diaochan	
2020	Miss S	旗袍美探	Liu Ruqing	
2020	Together	在一起	Wang Manli	
2020	Legend of Fei	有翡	Duan Jiuniang	
2020	The Case Solver	拆案	Che Suwei	
2021	Long Live Life	生活万岁	Leader Ping	Cameo
2021	Faith Makes Great	理想照耀中国	Zhao Xinhua	Segment 'Green Car'
2021	Novoland: Pearl Eclipse	斛珠夫人	Lang Huan	Special Appearance
2023	Rising With the Wind	我要逆风去	Hong Die	
2023	Only for Love	以爱为营	Song Lelan	
TBA	Love in Aranya	阿那亚恋情	Gu Ruo	
TBA	Tango of the Rainbow	探戈	Su Kang	
TBA	Go Along With You	慢慢地陪着你走	Shen Xinxin	Not broadcast

== Discography ==
=== Single albums ===
Year	English title	Chinese title	Notes
2005	Fall Head Over Heels	爱到死心塌地	
2008	Chuzhao	出招	
2010	Flower Season	花期	
2011	By Your Side	在你身边	
2011	Years	年华	
2012	Thank You, My Love	谢谢你我的爱人	
2012	Love you Love you	爱你爱你	
2013	Ten Years	拾年	

== Awards and nominations ==
Year	Nominated work	Award	Category	Result	Ref.
2009	And the Spring Comes	27th Golden Rooster Awards	Best Supporting Actress	Nominated	
