= 27th Golden Rooster Awards =

2009 Chinese film awards ceremony

The 27th Golden Rooster Awards was an award ceremony honoring the best Chinese language films of 2008–09. The award ceremony was held in Jiangxi, Nanjing.

== Winners and nominees ==
Best Film	Best Director
Assembly; Forever Enthralled; And the Spring Comes; Turning Point 1977	Feng Xiaogang － Assembly; Cao Baoping － The Equation of Love and Death; Chen Kaige － Forever Enthralled; Gordon Chan － Painted Skin; Ning Hao － Crazy Racer
Best Actor	Best Actress
Wu Gang － Iron Man; Fan Wei － Lucky Dog; Ma Guowei － Old Fish; Sun Min － Deng Pingshou; Zhang Hanyu － Assembly	Zhou Xun － The Equation of Love and Death; Jiang Wenli － And the Spring Comes; Zhao Wei － Painted Skin; Helen Yao － Blossom; Zhang Ziyi － Forever Enthralled
Best Writing	Best Directorial Debut
Jiang Haiyang/Gu Bai/Zong Fuxian － Turning Point 1977; Cheng Xiaoling － The Clear Water; Li Qiang － And the Spring Comes; Liu Heng － Assembly; Shu Ping － A Tale of Two Donkeys; Su Xiaowei － Six Sisters	Li Dawei － A Tale of Two Donkeys; Xierzhati Yahepu － 2008 of Maimaiti; Huang He － Deng Pingshou; Peng Jiahuang/Peng Chen － Walk to School
Best Supporting Actor	Best Supporting Actress
Wang Xueqi － Forever Enthralled; Deng Chao － Assembly; Huang Bo － Iron Man; Jiao Gang － And the Spring Comes; Sun Honglei － Forever Enthralled; Yang Xinmin － Her Promise	Yue Hong － A Tale of Two Donkeys; Cao Cuifen － Six Sisters in the War; Dong Xuan － And the Spring Comes; Jiang Hongbo － Looking for Jackie; Sun Li － Painted Skin
Best Cinematography	Best Art Direction
Assembly － Lü Yue; Red Cliff － Lü Yue & Zhang Li; Iron Man － Zhao Fei; Wheat－ Zhao Xiaoshi; Painted Skin － Arthur Wong; Empire of Silver － Anthony Pun	Iron Man － Lu Yue-lin, Yu Maiduo
Best Music	Best Sound Recording
Assembly － Wang Liguang	Axis of War: The First of August － Wang Lewen, Li Anlei, An Shaofeng
Best Documentary	Best Science Film
Fights A Decisive Battle The Orphan City	The Moon
Best Children Feature	Best Chinese Opera Film
Walking to School	Inspector and Prince
Best Animation	Best Short Film
The Magic Aster	Zou Si Fang

== Special awards ==
Lifetime Achievement Award

- Qin Yi
- Yu Lan

Special Jury Award

- Film: Axis of War: The First of August
- Screenwriter: Cheng Xiaoling (The Clear Water)
