= Yang Shu (cinematographer) =

- Born: September 23, 1963 (age 62)
- Occupation: Cinematographer
- Years active: 1990s-present
- Awards: Golden Camera 300; Peacock (2005)

Chinese name
- Traditional Chinese: 楊述
- Simplified Chinese: 杨述
Transcriptions
Standard Mandarin
- Hanyu Pinyin: Yáng Shù

Yang Shu (simplified Chinese: 杨述; traditional Chinese: 楊述; born September 23, 1963) is a Chinese cinematographer based in Beijing. His work was recognized at the Manaki Brothers International Film Camera Festival, where he was awarded the top prize of the Golden Camera 300 for his work as director of photography on Peacock (2005).

== Filmography ==
=== As cinematographer ===
Year	English Title	Chinese Title	Director
1991	Peering from the Moon		Henry Chow
1997	Frozen	极度寒冷	Wang Xiaoshuai
1998	Restless		Jule Gilfillan
2005	Peacock	孔雀	Gu Changwei
2005	Rainbow	我心飞翔	Gao Xiaosong
2006	One Foot Off the Ground	鸡犬不宁	Chen Daming
2008	Shanghai 1976	上海1976	Hu Xueyang
2008	The Equation of Love and Death	李米的猜想	Cao Baoping
2010	Sacrifice	赵氏孤儿	Chen Kaige
2012	Caught in the Web	搜索	Chen Kaige
