= Kongque =

Kongque (Chinese: 孔雀) is the Chinese name for peacock.

Kongque may also refer to:

- Kongque River, a river in Xinjiang, China
- Peacock (2005 film)
