= All the Invisible Children =

- Directed by: Various
- Written by: Various
- Produced by: Various
- Starring: Leo Folla
- Cinematography: Various
- Edited by: Various
- Music by: Various
- Distributed by: 01 Distribution (Italy); Kinovista (France)
- Release date: 1 September 2005 (VFF)
- Running time: 124 minutes
- Countries: France; Italy
- Language: Mandarin / English / Italian / Portuguese / Serbian

All the Invisible Children is a 2005 anthology film on the theme of childhood and exploitation. It is a collection of seven short films, each focused on a different child. The film has a total runtime of 116 minutes, averaging 16 minutes each. It premiered at the Venice Film Festival on 1 September 2005.

== Segment descriptions, in brief ==
In order of appearance:

1. Tanza, directed by Mehdi Charef (set in an unnamed African country, but it was filmed in Burkina Faso) – A child soldier is instructed to blow up a building. He enters the building to place a bomb. It turns out to be a school, and he decides not to do it.
2. Blue Gypsy, directed by Emir Kusturica (set in Serbia & Montenegro) – A boy is released from a juvenile detention center. He wants to be a barber. However, his father forces him to steal again.
3. Jesus Children of America, directed by Spike Lee (set in the US) – A couple is addicted to drugs and infected with HIV. They have a daughter who is also infected, and bullied for that at school. The film features among others Rosie Perez as Ruthie and Hannah Hodson as Blanca.
4. João and Bilú, directed by Kátia Lund (set in Brazil) – A boy and a girl earn money collecting empty cans, cardboard, etc., for recycling.
5. Jonathan, directed by Ridley Scott and Jordan Scott (set in the UK) – War photographer Jonathan (David Thewlis) looks back at his youth.
6. Ciro, directed by Stefano Veneruso (set in Naples, Italy) – Two boys steal a watch from a person in his Mercedes SUV while waiting in traffic, and sell it to a man working in an amusement park, for money and free rides.
7. Song Song and Little Cat, directed by John Woo (set in China) – An old man finds an abandoned baby and becomes her guardian. When he dies she ends up being taken in by a man who has a group of children, that has to work for their food. She has to sell flowers on the street and every night return to give the days's earnings to the leader. The leader gets angry when a child does not make enough money. The cheerfulness of the girl is contrasted with the unhappiness of a rich girl and her mother, who finds out that her husband had an affair and a young son with his mistress. These characters are linked by a doll that was thrown away by the rich girl and found by the poor girl's guardian.

== Film production background ==
All the Invisible Children is a concept of producer Chiara Tilesi. Together with Stefano Veneruso, her producing partner of MK Film Productions, they worked together in the realization of this film composed of seven segments directed by authoritative directors. Each of the directors narrate, through their own personal perspective, unique stories about the children's condition in their part of the world.

Considering the complexity and actual aim of the project, the producers felt the need to involve different personalities and institutions. All the Invisible Children was produced by Maria Grazia Cucinotta, Chiara Tilesi and Stefano Veneruso for MK Film Productions, in conjunction with associate producers Gaetano Daniele, Anna Rita Dell'Atte, Cesare Falletti di Villafalletto and Andrea Piedimonte. The film was co-produced by Rai Cinema and distributed in Italy by 01 Distribution.

== Tanza directed by Mehdi Charef ==
Tanza
- Directed by: Mehdi Charef
- Written by: Mehdi Charef
- Starring: Leo Folla
- Cinematography: Philippe Brelot
- Edited by: Yannick Kergoat
- Music by: Rokia Traore
- Release date: 1 September 2005 (VFF)

=== Plot ===
Seven young freedom fighters, heavily armed, are covering ground looking for the enemy. At twenty-one their leader is the eldest. Tanza is twelve and has joined this group after witnessing the massacre of his family. While bathing in a river in the middle of the forest, trying to forget their lives as soldiers for a while, they are unaware that in a short time one of them will be dead and one will be sent to blow up a school, where in a few hours other children just like them will be arriving.

=== Production credits ===
- Art direction – Tiendrebéogo Rasmané
- Costume design – Martine Somé
- Makeup designer – Aminata Zouré

== Blue Gypsy directed by Emir Kusturica ==
Uroš (Blue Gypsy)
- Directed by: Emir Kusturica
- Written by: Stribor Kusturica
- Produced by: Emir Kusturica
- Starring: Leo Folla
- Cinematography: Michel Amathieu
- Edited by: Svetolik Zajc
- Music by: Stribor Kusturica
- Release date: 1 September 2005 (VFF)

=== Plot ===
Uroš (Blue Gypsy), is about to be released from the juvenile detention centre in which he has spent quite a long time. He is facing the mixed feelings that he has towards his release: dealing again with his father who forces him to steal yet being supposedly freed into the outside world. Uroš' choice will become clear once he find himself cornered.

=== Production credits ===
- Costume design – Radovan Markovic
- Make-up artist – Marinela Spasenovic

== Jesus Children of America directed by Spike Lee ==
Jesus Children of America
- Directed by: Spike Lee
- Written by: Cinqué Lee
- Produced by: Mike Ellis
- Cinematography: Cliff Charles
- Edited by: Barry Alexander Brown
- Music by: Terence Blanchard
- Release date: 1 September 2005 (VFF)

=== Plot ===
Blanca (played by Hannah Hodson) is a Brooklyn teenager who has a daily routine of going to school and enjoying time with her friends despite the backdrop of utter squalor and poverty in which she lives with her parents. But this routine is interspersed with frequent visits to the hospital due to her continued ill health. After a school incident, she finally realises that she is an HIV positive daughter of drug addicted parents and the tale takes a dark and dramatic twist.

=== Production credits ===
- Production design – Sarah Frank
- Costume design – Donna Berwick
- Makeup – Martha Melendez

== Bilu & João directed by Katia Lund ==
Bilu & João
- Directed by: Katia Lund
- Written by: Eduardo Tripa
- Produced by: Ricardo Aidar
- Starring: Vera Fernandez
- Cinematography: Toca Seabra
- Edited by: Estevan Santos
- Music by: Antonio Pinto
- Release date: 1 September 2005 (VFF)

=== Plot ===
A day in the life of Bilu and João, two enterprising young children struggling to get by on the streets of São Paulo. Their treasures are empty cans, cardboard, discarded boards and nails; objects that society throws away. The children have to use their imagination to turn the urban landscape into their playground, turning refuse into returns. As their ambitions take them off the beaten path, they will need even more ingenuity to get them out of a jam.

=== Production credits ===
- Art direction – Carla Caffé
- Costume design – André Simonetti
- Makeup – Donna Meirelles

== Jonathan directed by Jordan Scott & Ridley Scott ==
Jonathan
- Directed by: Jordan Scott; Ridley Scott
- Written by: Jordan Scott
- Starring: David Thewlis; Kelly Macdonald; Jake Ritzema
- Cinematography: Jim Whitaker
- Edited by: Dayn Williams
- Music by: Ramin Djawadi
- Release date: 1 September 2005 (VFF)

=== Plot ===
Jonathan is the story about a shell-shocked photojournalist whose assignments have left him disillusioned with life and irrevocably unhinged. He dreams of freedom from what he has seen and happiness at any cost. He wants it so much that when he decides to run, he physically regresses back to when life was at its best and embarks on an incredible adventure, rediscovering the essence of life through childhood. The children he meets along the way challenge and inspire him to embrace his life once more.

=== Production credits ===
- Cinematographer – James Whitaker
- Production design – Ben Scott
- Costume design – Greg Fay
- Makeup – Melissa Lackersteen

== Ciro directed by Stefano Veneruso ==
Ciro
- Directed by: Stefano Veneruso
- Written by: Diego de Silva
- Cinematography: Vittorio Storaro
- Edited by: Ugo De Rossi
- Music by: Maurizio Capone
- Release date: 1 September 2005 (VFF)

=== Plot ===
Ciro is a kid from the outskirts of Naples. He lives in one of those cement housing projects built after the earthquake of 1980. Along with his friend Bertucciello, Ciro assaults a motorist in order to steal his Rolex. It's a co-ordinated attack composed of two simultaneous but separate actions. Ciro smashes one of the vehicle's windows with a hammer, glass flying everywhere, while Bertucciello grabs hold of the man's watch and rips it away from his wrist. The two kids run in separate directions towards the unforeseen – looking for a real childhood.

=== Production credits ===
- Art director – Annalisa Mucci
- Costume design – Maria Pennacchio
- Makeup director – Daniela Liuzzi

== Song Song and Little Cat directed by John Woo ==
Song Song and Little Cat
- Directed by: John Woo
- Written by: Li Qiang
- Produced by: Terence Chang
- Starring: Jiang Wenli; Zhao Zhicun
- Cinematography: Gu Changwei; Zeng Nianping
- Edited by: Robert A. Ferretti
- Music by: Elisa Toffoli; Hai Lin
- Release date: 1 September 2005 (VFF)

=== Plot ===
John Woo directs Zhao ZiCun (Song Song) and Qi RuYi (Little Cat) in a story of simple truth and undying perseverance through unbelievable hardship.

Told through the eyes of children, the story of two little girls leading lives of opposite circumstance unfolds. These two lives mirror, parallel and attract each other while delving deep into the emotional and physical challenges faced by children. This is a tale of hope.

=== Production credits ===
- Production design – Timmy Yip
- Art Director – Jia Neng Huang and Xiong Xiao
