= The Postmodern Life of My Aunt =

2006 Hong Kong film by Ann Hui

- Film poster

Chinese name
- Traditional Chinese: 姨媽的後現代生活
- Simplified Chinese: 姨妈的后现代生活
Transcriptions
- Directed by: Ann Hui
- Written by: Ann Hui; Li Qiang; Yan Yan (novel)
- Produced by: Wang Zhang
- Starring: Siqin Gaowa; Chow Yun-fat; Zhao Wei; Lisa Lu
- Cinematography: Kwan Pun Leung; Nelson Yu Lik Wai
- Edited by: Liao Ching-sung
- Music by: Joe Hisaishi
- Production companies: Cheerland Entertainment Organization; Beijing Poly-bona Film Publishing
- Release dates: 8 September 2006 (Toronto Film Festival); 2 March 2007 (Taiwan); 6 March 2007 (China); 8 March 2007 (Hong Kong)
- Running time: 111 minutes
- Countries: Hong Kong; China; Taiwan
- Languages: Mandarin; Shanghainese

The Postmodern Life of My Aunt (simplified Chinese: 姨妈的后现代生活; traditional Chinese: 姨媽的後現代生活; pinyin: Yimā de hòuxiàndài shēnghúo) is a 2006 Hong Kong serio-comedy film, directed by Ann Hui, starring Siqin Gaowa and Chow Yun-fat. The film also guest-stars Chinese actresses Zhao Wei and Lisa Lu.

Its executive producer was Yuan Mei; another producer was Wang Zhang (credited as Er Yong). The film was based on a novel of the same title written by Yan Yan (燕燕), while the film's screenplay was by Li Qiang, a Chinese scriptwriter, who had written the script of the 2005 film Peacock, directed by Gu Changwei.

== Synopsis ==
Ye Rutang (Siqin Gaowa), a single-living woman in her late fifties, struggles to maintain a dignified life amid the dangers of Shanghai. Living alone in an apartment, she endures gossipy neighbor Mrs Shui (Lisa Lu) and her pampered cat. She is pragmatic, frugal and self-reliant, but her old-fashionedness and trusting nature make it difficult for her to fit into Shanghai society.

After encountering self-proclaimed aesthete Pan Zhichang (Chow Yun-Fat), she falls for Pan and uses her life savings to invest on cemetery spaces on Pan's suggestion. He turns out to be a fraudster.

After being the victim of several con artists, Ye suffers a bad fall and is hospitalized. She decides to leave Shanghai to live with her working-class husband and cook daughter (Zhao Wei) in Anshan, Liaoning.

== Release and reception ==
The Postmodern Life of My Aunt premiered at film festivals around the world; it was a special presentation at the Toronto International Film Festival.

Perry Lam of Muse gave the film a very positive review: "The Postmodern Life of My Aunt is that rare thing in Hong Kong cinema, one that occupies the shadow land between tragedy and comedy. It's hard to categorize My Aunt and assign it to a genre because its characters are so fully formed and three-dimensional."

== Cast and roles ==
- Chow Yun-fat - Pan Zhichang, a suave, middle-aged con artist who sings Beijing Opera and is a self-proclaimed aesthete
- Siqin Gaowa - Ye Rutang ("the aunt"), a lady in her late fifties living alone in Shanghai away from her husband and daughter in Anshan. Her trusting nature makes her an easy target to swindlers.
- Zhao Wei - Liu Dafan, Ye's daughter, a cook in Anshan
- Fang Qingzhuo
- Guan Wenshuo - Kuan-kuan, Ye's nephew
- Jiao Gang - Guo Feng
- Lisa Lu - Mrs. Shui, Ye's neighbor in Shanghai. She is gossipy and is always with her cat.
- Shi Ke - Jin Yonghua, a woman who is so poor that she desperately attempts con jobs that lands her at the police station.
- Wang Yi - Nurse
- Wang Ziwen - Fei-fei
- Zhang Zhi-Hua - Nurse

== Filming locations ==
The film is set and was filmed in Shanghai and in Anshan, Liaoning, as Anshan is the birthplace of director Ann Hui. Filming locations in Shanghai include the overpass at Shaanxi and Yan'an roads, and the old houses on Julu Road. Filming in Anshan took place in the first days of 2006. The snow in Anshan was produced artificially.

== Awards and nominations ==
27th Hong Kong Film Awards

- Won: Best Actress (Siqin Gaowa)
- Won: Best Original Film Score (Joe Hisaishi)
- Nominated: Best Director (Ann Hui)
- Nominated: Best Supporting Actor (Chow Yun Fat)
- Nominated: Best Supporting Actress (Zhao Wei)
- Nominated: Best Screenplay (Li Qiang)
- Nominated: Best Cinematography (Kwan Pun Leung and Yu Lik Wai)
- Nominated: Best Costume Make Up Design (Ma Yu Tao)

43rd Golden Horse Awards

- Nominated: Best Actress (Siqin Gaowa)
- Nominated: Best Supporting Actress (Zhao Wei)
- Nominated: Best Adapted Screenplay (Li Qiang)

12th Golden Bauhinia Awards

- Nominated: Best Director (Ann Hui)
- Nominated: Best Screenplay (Li Qiang)

14th Hong Kong Film Critics Society Awards

- Won: Best Actress (Siqin Gaowa)
- Won: Best Director (Ann Hui)
- Won: Best Film

== See also ==
- Postmodernism

Awards and achievements
| Preceded by Election 2 | Hong Kong Film Critics Society Awards for Best Film; 2007 | Succeeded by The Way We Are |
