= Lan (film) =

- Film poster
- Directed by: Jiang Wenli
- Screenplay by: Jiang Wenli
- Produced by: Jiang Wenli; Dong Ping
- Starring: Yao Jun; Zhu Yinuo; Zhu Xu; Ma Sichun
- Cinematography: Jong Lin
- Edited by: Yang Hongyu; Liu Jiami
- Music by: Evgueni Galperine; Sacha Galperine
- Production companies: Beijing Asian Union Culture & Media Investment
- Release dates: 10 October 2009 (Pusan); 2 April 2010 (China)
- Running time: 85 minutes
- Country: China
- Language: Mandarin

Lan (Chinese: 我们天上见), also known as We'll Meet in Heaven, is a 2009 Chinese drama film written, directed and co-produced by Jiang Wenli.

== Cast ==
- Yao Jun as Jiang Xiaolan
- Zhu Yinuo as Jiang Xiaolan
- Zhu Xu as Tang
- Ma Sichun as Li Yingcui
