= Touching Starlight =

1996 television film

- 星星点灯
- Written by: Sun Wenxue
- Directed by: Sun Wenxue
- Starring: Zhang Ziyi
- Country of origin: China
- Original language: Mandarin

Original release
- Release: 1996

Touching Starlight (or Starlight, Chinese: 星星点灯) is a 1996 Chinese film made for television directed and written by Sun Wenxue.

== History ==
It was the first film to star the actress Zhang Ziyi. It was made for Chinese television on a low budget and was later released on Video CD without English subtitles. English subtitles for the film were later created by some fans of Zhang Ziyi and the subtitled version released on the Internet.
