= Li Qiang (screenwriter) =

Chinese screenwriter (born 1968)

- Born: 1968 (age 57–58); Anyang, Henan, China
- Occupation: Screenwriter
- Writing career
- Notable awards: Golden Horse Award (2013)

Li Qiang (Chinese: 李樯; born 1968) is a Chinese screenwriter.

== Filmography ==
Year	Title	Role	Director	Notes
2001	Rich Dad, Poor Dad 富爸爸，穷爸爸	Screenplay		Play
2002	Nü Ren Xing 女人心	Screenplay	Yang Wenjun	Television Series, 18 episodes
2005	Hero of the Year	Screenplay	Liu Xingang	Television Series, 32 episodes
2005	Peacock 孔雀	Screenplay	Gu Changwei	Chinese Film Media Award for Best Screenplay
2005	All the Invisible Children; Song Song and Little Cat 桑桑与小猫	Screenplay	John Woo	
2006	The Postmodern Life of My Aunt 姨妈的后现代生活	Screenplay	Ann Hui	Chunyan Award for Best Screenplay; Nominated - Chinese Film Media Award for Best Screenplay; Nominated - Golden Bauhinia Award for Best Screenplay; Nominated - Golden Horse Award for Best Adapted Screenplay; Nominated - Hong Kong Film Award for Best Screenplay
2007	And the Spring Comes 立春	Screenplay	Gu Changwei	Nominated - Asian Film Award for Best Screenplay; Nominated - Golden Rooster Award for Best Writing
2013	So Young 致我们终将逝去的青春	Screenplay	Zhao Wei	Golden Horse Award for Best Adapted Screenplay; Hundred Flowers Award for Best Writing; Nominated - Asian Film Award for Best Screenplay; Nominated - Asia Pacific Film Festival Best Screenplay; Nominated - China Film Director's Guild Award for Best Screenplay; Nominated - Golden Rooster Award for Best Adapted Screenplay
2014	The Golden Era 黄金时代	Screenplay; Producer	Ann Hui	Golden Rooster Award for Best Original Screenplay; Nominated - Asian Film Award for Best Screenplay; Nominated - Golden Horse Award for Best Original Screenplay; Nominated - Hong Kong Film Award for Best Screenplay
2016	No Other Love 没有别的爱	Screenplay; Producer	Zhao Wei	
