= Zhu Xu =

Chinese actor (1930–2018)

- Born: 15 April 1930; Shenyang, Liaoning, China
- Died: 15 September 2018 (aged 88); Beijing, China
- Occupation: Actor
- Years active: 1980–2018
- Awards: Carrousel International du Film; Best Actor; 1997 The King of Masks; Golden Phoenix Awards; 2007 Honorary Award; Tokyo International Film Festival; Best Actor; 1996 The King of Masks

Chinese name
- Chinese: 朱旭
Transcriptions
Standard Mandarin
- Hanyu Pinyin: Zhū Xù

Zhu Xu (Chinese: 朱旭; 15 April 1930 – 15 September 2018) was a Chinese actor. He was well known for his roles in Zhang Yang's Shower and Wu Tianming's The King of Masks, the latter film winning him the Best Actor prize at the Tokyo International Film Festival.

== Filmography ==
- The Street Players (1987)
- Li Lianying: The Imperial Eunuch a.k.a. The Last Eunuch (1991) - Prince Chun
- The True-Hearted a.k.a. Heartstrings (1992)
- A Confucius Family a.k.a. Descendants of Confucius (1992) - Kong Lingtan
- The King of Masks (1996) - Wang Bianlian, the "King of Masks"
- Shower (1999) - Master Liu
- Beijing Herbs (2000) - Guan Juchen
- The Gua Sha Treatment (2001) - Father
- Ôsama no kampô (2004)
- Lan (2009)
