= Kwan Pun Leung =

Hong Kong cinematographer

Kwan Pun Leung (關本良) is a Hong Kong cinematographer. After starting his career as a photographer in the local arts and culture scene, he made his motion picture debut as director of photography on director Stanley Kwan’s 1997 film Hold You Tight. Kwan then worked on Ann Hui’s films July Rhapsody (2002) and The Postmodern Life of My Aunt (2006), as well as Wong Kar-wai’s 2004 film 2046 and My Blueberry Nights.

He was a senior lecturer in cinematography at the Hong Kong Academy for Performing Arts, the Chinese University of Hong Kong as well as the City University of Hong Kong.
