= Clé de Peau Beauté =

Luxury skincare and makeup brand

- Type: Subsidiary
- Industry: Luxury skincare and makeup
- Founded: 1982; 44 years ago in Japan
- Headquarters: Tokyo, Japan
- Parent: Shiseido
- Website: www.cledepeaubeaute.com

Clé de Peau Beauté is a Japanese luxury skincare and makeup brand. It was launched in 1982 in Japan. The brand is available in 23 countries and regions worldwide. It is part of Shiseido, the Japanese multinational cosmetic company.

== Founding and history ==
Clé de Peau Beauté was started by Shiseido as a luxury line in 1982 in Japan. By adopting a French name and distinct from the Shiseido identity, the brand leveraged France's association with beauty and perfume to appeal to consumers. This premiumization tactic aimed to enhance consumer perception of quality through the product's implied country of origin in addition to Japanese standards.

In 2010, it was reported that Shiseido was repositioning the brand by fusing global and domestic marketing to improve its competitiveness in the "high prestige" segment of the global cosmetics market. At the time the brand was available primarily in Asia (China, Taiwan, South Korea, Malaysia, Thailand, Singapore, Vietnam and Indonesia) along with the United States and Canada totaling 11 global markets including the Japanese home market.

In 2012, Clé de Peau Beauté announced a new brand campaign with Amanda Seyfried as its new face and the slogan "The Radiance of Joy". The brand included the launch of a series of high-tech innovations which it introduced aiming to balance its product appeal between color and skincare across different markets.

It entered the UK market in 2019 available through an exclusive partnership with Harrods.

One of the brand’s most popular products, a moisturizer, retails for $550 in the U.S.

== Ambassadors and celebrity endorsements ==
Clé de Peau Beauté has relied on a number of celebrity ambassadors as part of its global branding strategy. These ambassadors have included Amanda Seyfried, Zhang Ziyi, and Felicity Jones.

In 2022, as part of its 40th anniversary celebration, Clé de Peau Beauté announced Dakota Fanning, Diana Silvers, and Ella Balinska as its newest ambassadors.

Martha Stewart has made TikTok and Instagram ads for the brand, targeted at prospective Gen Z customers.

Serena Williams, Kate Hudson, Rosie Huntington-Whiteley, Emma Roberts, and Chrissy Teigen are among the celebrities reported to be fans of the brand.

== UNICEF partnership ==
Since 2019, Clé de Peau Beauté has been a UNICEF corporate partner focusing on the education and skill development of girls, with the initiative reaching over 3.5 million girls between 2019 and 2022. The partnership, which was renewed in 2023 for another three years, includes an $8.7 million pledge from Clé de Peau Beauté to support UNICEF's Gender Equality Program, aiming to benefit a further 5.7 million girls through 2025.
