= Gao Yunxiang =

Chinese actor

Gao Shenghui
- Born: 15 August 1982 (age 44); Tianjin, China
- Other names: Gao Yunxiang, Gavin Gao
- Education: Shanghai Theatre Academy
- Occupation: Actor
- Years active: 2002-2018
- Agent: Yichuan Media
- Spouse: Dong Xuan (m. 2011–2019)
- Children: 1

Gao Shenghui (simplified Chinese: 高晟晖; traditional Chinese: 高晟暉; born 15 August 1982), formerly Gao Yunxiang (simplified Chinese: 高云翔; traditional Chinese: 高雲翔), also known as Gavin Gao, is a Chinese actor. He rose to prominence for his role in Legend of Mi Yue (2015). His career was derailed by a rape allegation in Sydney, of which he was acquitted in 2020. He has since worked primarily behind the scenes in theatre.

== Early life and education ==
Gao was born in Tianjin on August 15, 1982. He was a football player until 15. After an injury, he transitioned from sports to modeling. He graduated from Shanghai Theatre Academy.

== Acting career ==
Gao first screen acting credit was Ambition (2002) and subsequently appearing on television series such as Ordinary Life (2003), Watching Sunshine (2004), and A Beautiful New World (2005).

In 2005, he played a supporting role in Wind and Rain in Xiguan, starring Chen Kun and Sun Li and directed by Xu Geng.

Gao made his film debut in My Belle Boss (2007), a romantic comedy film starring Jing Tian and Peter Ho.

In 2008, Gao starred with Tiffany Tang and Zhang Yishan in Born After 80.

In 2009, he has appeared in four television series: Percussion Lane, Love Is Past, Late Marriage, and Nanny Mother.

For his role as Yang Rui in Goddess of Mercy, Gao won the Best TV Actor: Legend at the 6th Huading Awards.

In 2013, he had a supporting role in Legend of Lu Zhen, a historical television series starring Zanilia Zhao.

In 2014, Gao appeared in a number of television productions. He co-starred with Anita Yuen and Alex Man in Royal Romance as Shunzhi Emperor. He played the title role in Palace 3: The Lost Daughter, co-starring Lu Yi, Mabel Yuan and Shirley Dai.

Gao earned his second Huading Award for his performance as Zhai Li in Legend of Mi Yue (2015). That same year, he was cast as Erlang Shen in Ne Zha and Yang Jian, opposite Wong Cho-lam, Law Kar-ying and Ying Er.

In 2021, he changed his name to Gao Shenghui and returned to his native Tianjin from Beijing. He has since worked primarily behind the scenes in theatre.

== Personal life ==
Gao first met Dong Xuan in 2009. After dating for 4 months, they married in Beijing on August 21, 2011. Their daughter, nicknamed Xiao Jiuwo (Chinese: 小酒窝; lit. 'Little dimple'), was born on June 2, 2016. They divorced in March 2019. He later married a woman outside the entertainment industry, with whom he had a second daughter.

=== Sexual assault allegation ===
On 29 March 2018, Gao and producer Wang Jing were arrested in Sydney, Australia, following allegations by a 36-year-old woman that the two men had sexually assaulted her in a hotel three days earlier. Gao was in Sydney shooting TV series Love in Aranya, produced by Wang and co-starring Dong Xuan. In June, Gao was bailed on a A$3 million surety. In 2020, he and Wang were acquitted by the jury, who accepted the men’s assertions that the sex was consensual.

== Filmography ==
=== Film ===
Year	English title	Chinese title	Role	Notes
2007	My Belle Boss	我的美女老板	Xu Shijie/ Xu Wenjie	
2009	—N/a	金山	Wang Ma	
2013	The Midas Touch	超级经理人	Jian Long	
2013	Drug War	毒战	Xu Guoxiang	
2015	The Puzzle of Human Skin	人皮拼图	Chen Mo	

=== Television ===
Year	English title	Chinese title	Role	Notes
2002	Ambition	壮志雄心		
2003	Ordinary Life	平淡生活	Zhou Yue	
2004	Watching Sunshine	守候阳光	Lin Ziheng	
2005	Wind and Rain in Xiguan	风雨西关	Fang Jiajun	
2005	A Beautiful New World	美丽新天地	Zuo Wenhao	
2006	—N/a	飞翔的梧桐子	Wu Tong	
2006	Go out Your Love	走出你的爱	Du Tianmu	
2006	Youth Song	青春之歌	Lu Jiachuan	
2006	—N/a	此情可问天	Zeng Ping	
2007	—N/a	一世情缘	Tang Teng	
2008	Born After 80	生于80后	Li Jun	
2008	—N/a	小家大事	Zhu Daqi	
2009	Percussion Lane	锣鼓巷	Li Daren	
2009	Love Is Past	当爱已成往事	Hai Xun	
2009	Nanny Mother	保姆妈妈	An Zichen	
2009	Late Marriage	晚婚	Geng Qiang	
2011	For Mother's Name	以母亲的名义	Hong Dagui	
2011	Crossbow	断喉弩	Dao Feng	
2011	Goddess of Mercy	新玉观音	Yang Rui	
2012	Mother-in-law Is Also Mother	婆婆也是妈	Li Weida	
2013	Legend of Lu Zhen	陆贞传奇	Xu Xianxiu	
2013	Sword Shadow	刀影	Peng Tiange	
	Royal Romance	多情江山	Shunzhi Emperor	
	Locked Dream Building	锁梦楼	Jiang Dahai	
	—N/a	天地情缘	Zongzheng Fenglin	
	Palace 3: The Lost Daughter	宫锁连城	Jiang Yichen	
	The Last Battle	最后一战	Zhang Huaibin	
	The First Column	第一纵队	Lei Yuan	
2015	Ne Zha and Yang Jian	哪吒与杨戬	Yang Jian	
2015	Love You, Countless Ties	爱你，万缕千丝	Fang Qiu	
2015	Legend of Mi Yue	芈月传	Zhai Li	
2015	Legend of Ban Shu	班淑传奇	Su Li	
2015	The World of Love	失宠王妃之结缘	Prince Feng Lin	
2016	No Marriage	不婚	Yao Tianyi	
2016	—N/a'	北上广的四季沐歌		
2018	Tango of the Rainbow Tomorrow	探戈	Wei Minglun	
2018	The Legend of Ba Qing	巴清传	Qin Shi Huang	
2018	Son of Hero	惊天岳雷	Yue Lei	

== Film and TV Awards ==
Year	Nominated work	Award	Category	Result	Notes
2011	Goddess of Mercy	6th Huading Awards	Best TV Actor: Legend	Won	
2016	Legend of Mi Yue	19th Huading Awards	Best TV Actor: Ancient	Won	
