= Love on the Cloud =

- Film poster
- Directed by: Gu Changwei
- Written by: Gu Wei
- Produced by: Rong Yang
- Starring: Angelababy; Michael Chen; Zhang Luyi
- Cinematography: Yang Shu
- Music by: Liu Ye
- Release date: December 24, 2014 (China)
- Running time: 98 minutes
- Country: China
- Language: Mandarin
- Box office: $42.2 million

Love on the Cloud (Chinese: 微爱之渐入佳境) is a 2014 Chinese romantic comedy film directed by Gu Changwei. It was released on December 24, 2014.

== Cast ==
- Angelababy
- Michael Chen
- Zhang Luyi
- Cao Lu
- Wang Ji
- Jiang Ruijia
- Ju Hao
- Tu Yanni
- Jiang Wu
- Mao Amin
- Song Dongye
- Wang Baoqiang
- Jiang Wenli
- Wang Jiajia
- Tong Dawei
- Wen Zhang

== Reception ==
The film earned CN¥285.051 million at the Chinese box office.

Derek Elley of Film Business Asia gave the film a 7 out of 10, saying that a "likeable cast gives an average rom-com/movie satire an unpretentious, fluffy charm."
