= The Gua Sha Treatment =

2001 Chinese film directed by Zheng Xiaolong

- Film poster
- Directed by: Zheng Xiaolong
- Written by: Mark Byers; Sit Ka-wah; Huo Bingquan; Wang Xiaoping
- Produced by: Mark Byers; Zhou Puxiong; Paul Yen (associate producer)
- Starring: Tony Leung Ka-Fai; Dennis Zhu; Zhu Xu; Jiang Wenli
- Cinematography: Arthur Wong
- Music by: Ye Xiaogang
- Production company: Beijing Forbidden City Film
- Release date: 2001
- Running time: 105 minutes
- Country: China
- Languages: English; Mandarin

The Gua Sha Treatment (Chinese: 刮痧; pinyin: guā shā) is a 2001 Chinese drama film directed by Zheng Xiaolong and starring Tony Leung Ka-Fai, Zhu Xu, and Jiang Wenli. The film is a story about cultural conflicts experienced by a Chinese family in the United States. It focuses on a misunderstanding caused by traditional Chinese medicine, which leads to the threat of separating a family.

== Plot ==
Grandfather Xu (Zhu Xu) comes from China to visit the family of his son, Datong Xu (Tony Leung), a video game designer, in St. Louis. Datong has lived in the U.S. for eight years, and while receiving an award for work, remarks that he loves the United States and fulfilling his American Dream. Meanwhile, Grandfather notices his grandson has a slight fever and being unable to read English labels of medicine, gives him, Dennis Xu (Dennis Zhu), a Gua Sha treatment instead. Social workers, however, mistake the traditional Chinese medical treatment for child abuse due to the obvious marks left on Dennis' back. The life of the family is sent into turmoil when Dennis is taken away by the child protection agency. In court, the prosecution includes Datong's inclusion of a Chinese legendary character Sun Wukong (Chinese traditional: 孫悟空; simplified: 孙悟空) in his design of a violent video game. The prosecution implies that since Datong includes violence in his game, he values it.

A furious Datong insists that the prosecution does not understand the cultural value of Sun Wukong and that the icon's inclusion does not mean he abuses his son. He insists that what he does in his job does not relate to how he runs his home. Meanwhile, Grandfather Xu leaves America because he finds that the living environment is really not suitable for him, as he does not want to live in a place where a simple, harmless treatment like Gua Sha, which is so common in China, is treated as child abuse. Furthermore, he cannot converse in English. Datong's friend and lawyer, John Quinlan (Hollis Houston), tries Gua Sha and proves that the treatment leaves painful-looking marks that are not actually painful or harmful at all. Finally, Datong is able to return home and the family is reunited. This movie's story is meant to demonstrate the difference between western and Chinese culture.

== Cast ==
- Tony Leung Ka-Fai as Xu Datong
- Jiang Wenli as Jian Ning
- Zhu Xu as Old Grandfather

== Awards ==
2001 华语电影传媒大奖最佳导演提名奖
