= Princess Raccoon =

- Japanese theatrical poster
- Directed by: Seijun Suzuki
- Written by: Yoshio Urasawa
- Produced by: Nobuyuki Tohya; Satoru Ogura; Ikki Katashima
- Starring: Zhang Ziyi; Joe Odagiri; Hiroko Yakushimaru; Saori Yuki; Mikijiro Hira
- Cinematography: Yonezo Maeda
- Music by: Michiru Oshima; Ryomei Shirai
- Production companies: Dentsu; Kadokawa Eiga; Shochiku; Eisei Gekijō; Ogura Jimusho
- Distributed by: Nippon Herald Films
- Release date: May 28, 2005
- Running time: 111 minutes
- Country: Japan
- Language: Japanese/Mandarin

Princess Raccoon (Japanese: オペレッタ狸御殿, Hepburn: Operetta tanuki goten) is a 2005 Japanese film directed by Seijun Suzuki. The "raccoon" of the English title is actually a translation for the tanuki or Japanese raccoon-dog. It is a love story set in the musical genre and stars Zhang Ziyi as a tanuki princess and Joe Odagiri as the banished prince she falls in love with. The film premiered at the 2005 Cannes Film Festival. It was the last film Suzuki directed.

== Plot ==
The Lord of Castle Grace, Azuchi Momoyama, is used to asking a prophetess to confirm he is the fairest of all living things. On one occasion, the prophetess reveals that his son Prince Amechiyo will soon become the fairest. Azuchi Momoyama orders his son to be killed at Sacred Mountain. The plan fails when the assassin is trapped by racoon hunters. While Amechiyo sleeps, Princess Racoon, finds him and takes him to the Raccoon Palace. Soon, Amechiyo and the Princess are in love. The Racoons are against the romance because it is a known law that "No man should love a racoon. Even less should a racoon ever love a man". Azuchi Monoyama learns his son is still alive so he engages in a war to get him killed. Amechiyo has to look for a golden frog deep in the mountain to save the princess. It appears that the lovers' romance is doomed.

== Cast ==
- Zhang Ziyi as Princess Raccoon
- Joe Odagiri as Amechiyo
- Hiroko Yakushimaru as Hagi
- Mikijiro Hira as Azuchi Momoyama
- Tarō Yamamoto as Ostrich Monk
- Gentaro Takahashi as Butler Raccoon
- Saori Yuki as prophetess Virgen Hag
- Miwako Ichikawa as Kome

== Reception ==
On review aggregator Rotten Tomatoes, the film holds an approval rating of 80% based on five reviews, with an average rating of 6.1 out of 10.

Mark Kermode of The Guardian wrote "Western audiences may be aware that great swaths of Japanese cultural references are simply washing over them, but the cultural hybridity is so wide ranging that no one could feel utterly excluded from the film's peculiar spell."

Jonathan Trout of BBC said "You can't suspend your disbelief through all the madness: Princess Raccoon sometimes looks eerily like your average provincial panto, with Ziyi Zhang in the role of the grimacing soap star. But if you can hack the weirdness and the dreadful songs - and don't mind the odd five minutes of head-scratching - it's like nothing you've ever seen before."

David Parkinson of Empire Magazine commented that "The theatricality and nods towards Hong Kong period sagas will attract a cult following, but the lack of genuine fantasy, romance or wit renders it a multi-cultural musical muddle."

According to Derek Elley of Variety "[the film is] a cultural and linguistic potpourri that plays like Kabuki theater-meets-Gilbert & Sullivan."

Time Out called the film a "cult favourite" and added that "The kitsch spectacle of 'Princess Raccoon' dazzles the eye, though the emotions are little engaged, while the intellect gets slowly frazzled."
