= Distance (2015 film) =

- Poster
- Chinese: 再见，在也不见
- Directed by: Xin Yukun; Tan Shijie; Sivaroj Kongsakul
- Starring: Chen Bolin; Jiang Wenli; Tony Yang; Paul Chun; Chayanit Chansangavej
- Production companies: Guangxi Films Group; Guangxi Tianchang Investment; Xin Yingxiang Culture Investment Group; Changjinglu Cinema Studio
- Distributed by: Beijing Juhe Yinglian Media (China)
- Release dates: 5 November 2015 (52nd Golden Horse); 13 May 2016 (China); 20 May 2016 (Taiwan)
- Running time: 108 minutes
- Countries: China; Thailand; Singapore; Taiwan
- Languages: Mandarin; English
- Box office: CN¥11.6 million (China)

Distance (Chinese: 再见，在也不见) is a 2015 anthology drama film directed by Xin Yukun, Tan Shijie, and Sivaroj Kongsakul and starring Chen Bolin, Jiang Wenli, Tony Yang, Paul Chun and Chayanit Chansangavej. A Chinese-Thai-Singaporean-Taiwanese co-production, the film was shown at the 52nd Golden Horse Film Festival and Awards on 5 November 2015 and was released in China by Beijing Juhe Yinglian Media on 13 May 2016 and in Taiwan on 20 May 2016. The film consists of three short segments, each of which was intended by executive producer Anthony Chen to focus on one of three types of relationship: family, friendship and love.

== Plot ==
A conflicted manager on a business trip is intrigued by an elderly worker and investigates his life.

A young father receives a letter that brings him to a foreign land, where old emotions come unburied.

A visiting professor from overseas sets a student's heart fluttering, while having to deal with his own.

Different characters, different relationships, the same humanity; stories about the distances between us and how we live with them.

== Cast ==
- Chen Bolin
- Jiang Wenli
- Tony Yang
- Paul Chun
- Chayanit Chansangavej
- Feng Li
- Yeo Yann Yann

== Reception ==
The film has grossed CN¥11.6 million at the Chinese box office.
