= King of the Children =

1987 film

King of the Children 孩子王
- Film poster
- Directed by: Chen Kaige
- Screenplay by: He Jianjun; Chen Kaige
- Based on: Háizǐ Wáng by Ah Cheng
- Produced by: Wu Tianming
- Starring: Chen Shaohua; Xie Yuan
- Cinematography: Gu Changwei
- Edited by: Liu Miaomiao
- Music by: Qu Xiao-Song; Tian Zhuangzhuang
- Production company: Xi'an Film Studio
- Release date: 1987
- Running time: 107 minutes
- Country: China
- Language: Mandarin

King of the Children (Chinese: 孩子王; pinyin: Háizǐ Wáng) is a 1987 drama film directed by Chen Kaige and starring Chen Shaohua. The film was based on a novella of the same name by Ah Cheng. The film competed for the Palme D'Or at the 1988 Cannes Film Festival.

== Plot ==
A young man is sent to teach at a rural school in a poverty-stricken area of Yunnan province.

== Cast ==
- Chen Shaohua
- Xie Yuan
- Yang Xuewen

== Reception ==
King of the Children received a highly positive review in Time Out, where a reviewer wrote, "There are echoes here of a film like Padre Padrone, but Chen's film is completely free of flabby humanist sentimentality. [...] By Chinese standards, this is film-making brave to the point of being visionary. By any standards, this follow-up to Yellow Earth and The Big Parade is also something like a masterpiece."
