= Aviv Nevo =

Venture capitalist

Aviv "Vivi" Nevo (Hebrew: אביב נבו; born 1965) is an Israeli-American venture capitalist. He is a major shareholder in Time Warner and other companies, having built his fortune up from an initial $10 million inheritance.

== Biography ==
Nevo was born in Bucharest in Communist Romania in 1965. As an infant, he moved to Tel Aviv, Israel with his parents. His father, a chemical engineer and his mother, an anesthesiologist, eventually divorced. Nevo is an only child. He is Jewish.

== Business career ==
Stan Berk, a former hedge fund manager who hired Nevo in the 1980s after they met at a Los Angeles gym, said Nevo worked for him from 1985 to 1988, and then "just disappeared." After a certain time period, they met again, and "Nevo had befriended billionaires and media titans.

According to an anonymous business associate of Nevo, with an inheritance of around $10 million, Nevo set about investing and networking. The New York Times reported that Nevo "opened trading accounts at Goldman Sachs and Morgan Stanley, as well as Allen & Co., which eventually won him an invitation to Sun Valley... Through diligence and hard work, the right contacts and a lot of the right trades during the dot-com bubble of the late 1990s, he turned his inheritance into a sizable fortune ... Later on, Nevo began sprinkling money around in private companies, many of which were new media ventures."

His venture capital firm, NV Investments, invests in technology companies worldwide, and is said to have been an early backer of The Weinstein Company, and the largest individual shareholder in Time Warner.

== Personal life and reputation ==
Nevo is said to be averse to publicity: He has consistently refused requests for interviews, and was referred to by friends as an "international man of mystery."

In July 2008, Nevo said that long-running rumors of an engagement to Chinese actress Zhang Ziyi were true. The couple separated in 2010.
