= Zheng Xiaolong =

Chinese TV and film director and screenwriter

- Born: November 30, 1952 (age 73); Beijing, China
- Education: Peking University
- Occupations: Director; screenwriter
- Years active: 1990–present
- Spouse: Wang Xiaoping (m. 1992)
- Children: 1

Chinese name
- Traditional Chinese: 鄭曉龍
- Simplified Chinese: 郑晓龙
Transcriptions
Standard Mandarin
- Hanyu Pinyin: Zhèng Xiǎolóng

Zheng Xiaolong (Chinese: 郑晓龙; born November 30, 1953) is a Chinese TV and film director and screenwriter.

== Biography ==
Zheng was born in 1952. His father was a soldier. He enlisted in the People's Liberation Army (PLA) in 1970 and worked as a publicity officer. After retiring from the military, he became a journalist for Beijing People's Broadcasting Station. In 1978, he enrolled at the branch campus of Peking University, and after graduating in 1982, he started working at Beijing Television Studio.

== Personal life ==
In April 1985, the 3rd National Short Story Award Ceremony was held in Nanjing, Jiangsu, where Zheng and Wang Xiaoping (王小平) met during the conference. In 1990, Wang pursued advanced studies in the United States. Two years later, Zheng married her in America, and she gave birth to a son.

== Selected filmography ==
- Stories from the Editorial Board (1991)—China's first sitcom
- A Native of Beijing in New York (1992)—first Chinese TV series shot in the US, see Beijinger in New York
- The Gua Sha Treatment (2001)
- Golden Marriage (2008)
- Chuncao (2008)
- I'm a Boss (2009)
- Empresses in the Palace (2011)
- Red Sorghum (2014)
- The Legend of Mi Yue (2015)
- The Curse of Turandot (2021)
- The Legend of Zang Hai (2025)

== Awards and nominations ==
Year	Nominated work	Award	Result	Ref.
2000	Year After Year	Chunyan Awards, Best Director	Won	
2008	Golden Marriage	Shanghai Television Festival, Magnolia Award for Best Director	Won	
2009	Golden Marriage	Flying Apsaras Awards, Outstanding Director	Won	
2010	Golden Marriage	Chunyan Awards, Best Director	Won	
2012	Empresses in the Palace	Macau International Television Festival, Best Director	Won	
2012	Empresses in the Palace	Shanghai Television Festival, Magnolia Award for Best Director	Won	
2013	Empresses in the Palace	Chunyan Awards, Best Director	Won	
2014	Empresses in the Palace	Asia Rainbow TV Awards, Best Director	Won	
2014	Red Sorghum	Shanghai Television Festival, Magnolia Award for Best Director	Nominated	
2015	Red Sorghum	Huading Awards, Best Director	Won	
2016	The Legend of Mi Yue, Red Sorghum	China TV Golden Eagle Award, Best Director	Won	
