= And the Spring Comes =

- Film poster
- Traditional Chinese: 立春
- Simplified Chinese: 立春
- Hanyu Pinyin: lì chūn
- Directed by: Gu Changwei
- Written by: Li Qiang
- Produced by: Gu Changwei; Er Yong
- Starring: Jiang Wenli; Wu Guohua; Li Guangjie; Dong Xuan; Jiao Gang; Zhang Yao
- Cinematography: Wang Lei
- Edited by: Yang Hongyu
- Music by: Dou Peng
- Release dates: 24 October 2007 (Rome Film Festival); 11 April 2008 (China)
- Running time: 105 minutes
- Country: China
- Language: Mandarin

And the Spring Comes (Chinese: 立春; pinyin: lì chūn) is a 2007 film directed by Gu Changwei, written by Li Qiang. This is Gu's second feature following his acclaimed feature debut Peacock. The film premiered at the 2007 Rome Film Festival, and the lead actress Jiang Wenli, also Gu Changwei's wife, won the Best Actress award.

== Synopsis ==
Set in a small town near Baotou, Wang Cailing is a vocal teacher who aspires to sing Italian opera at the National Opera House. She becomes acquainted with a young man who aspires to become a painter in the style of Vincent van Gogh, and a gay ballet dancer nearing the end of his career, among other artists. Each of them struggles to pursue their artistic ambitions while seeking acceptance from the people around them.

== Critical reception ==
Lead actress Jiang Wenli (who played Wang Cailing) won Best Actress from the Rome Film Festival and Golden Rooster Awards for her performance.
