= Jiang Wenli =

Chinese actress, director, producer, and screenwriter

- 蒋雯丽
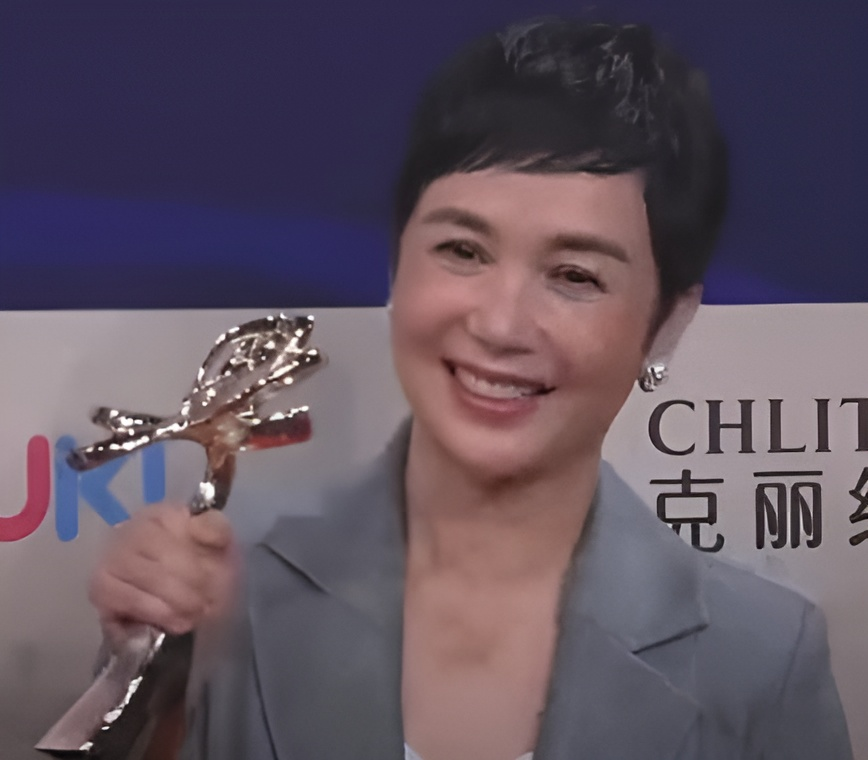
- Jiang at the 25th Shanghai Television Festival Magnolia Awards in June 2019
- Born: 20 June 1969 (age 57); Bengshan District, Bengbu, Anhui, China
- Education: Beijing Film Academy
- Occupation: Actress
- Years active: 1989-present
- Spouse: Gu Changwei
- Children: 2
- Relatives: Ma Sichun (niece); Jiang Wenjuan (sister)
- Awards: Full list

Chinese name
- Traditional Chinese: 蔣雯麗
- Simplified Chinese: 蒋雯丽
Transcriptions
Standard Mandarin
- Hanyu Pinyin: Jiǎng Wénlì

Jiang Wenli (Chinese: 蒋雯丽, born 20 June 1969) is a Chinese actress, director, producer, and screenwriter. A native of Tianjin, she graduated from the Beijing Film Academy in 1992. Li ranked 52nd on Forbes China Celebrity 100 list in 2014. In 2008, she became the first Chinese actress to win the "Grand Slam", after winning "Best Actress" trophy at the three biggest Chinese television awards including the Feitian Award, the Golden Eagle Award, and the Magnolia Award.

== Early life ==
Jiang was born into an affluent family. Her father Jiang Peiji (蒋培基) was a railroad engineer and her mother was a railroad telephone operator. Both of her parents love literature and the arts. She is the youngest of three sisters, her elder sister is Jiang Wenjuan (蒋文娟). Since Jiang was a young girl, her father taught her to appreciate famous books, paintings, and songs. When she was 5 years old, she dreamt about being a gymnast, so her mother sent her to study dance and gymnastics. However, since her stature did not fit the standards of a gymnast, the coach of the Bengbu city gymnastics team refused to regard her as a formal team member. Afterwards, she spent five years practicing as an informal member. At the age of 17, she took the college entrance examination with the goal of going to normal university. However, she was instead accepted by a water conservation secondary school because her score was five points below the acceptance line for a normal university. In 1986, she graduated from the secondary school and started to work at the Bengbu City Water Company. Her job was to design ways of water transportation for residents. Nevertheless, she was not satisfied with her life at the time and decided to go to Beijing in 1988 to start her new life.

Her niece Ma Sichun (daughter of Jiang Wenjuan) is also an active actress now.

== Career ==
Without any preparation, Jiang was accepted by the Beijing Film Academy. After she became a student of the academy, countless film companies invited her to play roles in their films. Her first role was a nursery school teacher in a TV series called Lily on Cliff, and that series won the Flying Apsaras Awards the same year. Jiang was also a candidate for the Best Supporting Actress award. After this, she played Shuixiu in the movie Li Li Yuan Shang Cao, which won an award at a French film festival. The last film of her college period was The Story of Xing Hua in which Jiang played a girl named Xing Hua. After graduating from college, she went to America for a long time before returning to China to continue her career.

After coming back to China, Jiang played a role in Miaomiao Liu's movie The Story of Xinghua. In 1993, she played an important role as Chengyi's mother in the movie Farewell My Concubine, which won the Best Movie Award at the Cannes Film Festival that year. In 1999, Jiang acted in a 20 episode TV series called Lead by the Hand, and for her performance she won one of the Chinese television industry's highest honors, Best Actress, from both the Golden Eagle Awards and the Flying Apsaras Awards. In 2000, for her performance in the film Female Coach & Male Player, Jiang won the Best Actress award from Huabiao Film Awards.

== Personal life ==
Jiang Wenli was married to Gu Changwei, the couple has a son Gu Hehe (顾哈哈).

== Filmography ==
=== Film ===
Year	English title	Chinese title	Role	Notes/Ref.
1989	Lili in Grassland	漓漓原上草	Shui Xiu	
1991	A Mysterious Couple	神秘夫妻	Bai Li	
1992	The Story of Xinghua	杏花三月天	Xinghua	
1993	Farewell My Concubine	霸王别姬	Mother of Xiao Douzi	
1996	Family Matters	家事	Yi Xin	
1997	Mr. Zhao	赵先生	Lin Cao	
1997	The Cat Steals Eyes	猫眼神偷	Miss. Wang	
1999	Female Coach & Male Player	女帅男兵	Wen Jie	
2000	The Gua Sha Treatment	刮痧	Jian Ning	
2003	Taiwan Story	台湾往事	The Mother	
2005	Shuangshuang and Her Cat	双双与小猫	Shuangshuang's mother	
2006	The Winter of Three Persons	三个人的冬天	Yun Feng	
2007	And the Spring Comes	立春	Wang Cailing	
2008	Lost Indulgence	秘岸	Fan Li	
2009	Lan	我们天上见	Dentist Wang	also director, producer, writer
2010	Major Secretary	第一书记	The Judge	
2011	Love for Life	最爱	Liang Fang	
2011	Son of the Stars	星星的孩子		associate producer
2013	Clear Truth	白相		
2014	Love on the Cloud	微爱之渐入佳境	The landlord	Cameo
2015	The Left Ear	左耳	Xu Yi's mother	Cameo
2015	The Master	师父	Zou Rong	
2015	Distance	再见，在也不见	Xie Hong	
2015	July Water	七月流水	Xiu Lan	
2016	A Wishing Tree	一棵心中的许愿树		
2017	Our Time Will Come	明月几时有	Mao Dun's wife	
2018	Nice to Meet You	遇见你真好	Housemaster	also producer
2019	Midnight Diner	深夜食堂		Guest appearance
2023	Hidden Strike	狂怒沙暴	Professor Chang	

=== Television series ===
Year	English title	Chinese title	Role	Notes/Ref.
1989	Cliff Lilies	悬崖百合	Su Shan	
1991	On the Mountain of Horse Race	跑马溜溜的山上	Sister Li	
1993	Shenheyuan	神禾塬	Mei Lian	
1995	Son of the Earth	大地之子	Jiang Yuemei	
1997	Holding Hands	牵手	Xia Xiaoxue	
1997	Sunset in the Forbidden City	日落紫禁城	Consort Zhen	
1997	Waiting One Thousand Years	千年等一回	A Xiu	
1998	Love You	爱你	Xu Wan	
1998	Guo Moruo and Anna	郭沫若与安娜	Anna	
2000	Warning Line	警戒线	Li Jingwei	
2001	Black Ice	黑冰	Wang Jingwen	
2001	The Grand Mansion Gate	大宅门	Bai Yuting	
2002	Unusual Citizen	非常公民	Wan Rong	
2003	The Grand Mansion Gate 2	大宅门2	Bai Yuting	
2004	He Loved Me, She Let Me Go	爱过我，放了我	Wen Qiang	
2004	I'm Looking Forward to Being Loved	好想好想谈恋爱	Tan Ailin	
2004	Chinese Divorce	中国式离婚	Lin Xiaofeng	
2005	Deep Breath	深呼吸	Xiao Xiumeng	
2006	Madam Yu Ching	玉卿嫂	Madam Yu Ching	
2007	Golden Anniversary	金婚	Wen Li	
2007	Fuwa	福娃	Athena	Voice role
2008	Seven Days that Shocked the World	震撼世界的七日	Du Lijuan	
2009	Blood Marriage	血色婚姻	Xu Ke	
2011	Happiness Knocks the Door	幸福来敲门	Jiang Lu	
2013	Mother Wants to Remarry	娘要嫁人	Qi Zhifang	
2013	Woman Gang	女人帮	Zhu Li	
2014	The Love Is Inconceivable	爱情最美丽	Niu Meili	
2016	Keep the Marriage as Jade	守身如玉	Su Ran	
2016	Hey, Kids	嘿，孩子	Fang Yun	
2017	The Flowers and Distant Place	花儿与远方	Hao Yulan	
2018	The Story of Zheng Yang Gate	正阳门下小女人	Xu Huizhen	
2021	The Dance of the Storm	风暴舞	Ruan Taiyuan	
TBA	The Corner of Love	转角之恋	Fang Ling	
TBA	Rights and Benefits	权与利	Qin Huinan	

== Awards and nominations ==
=== Film awards ===
Year	Nominated work	Award	Result	Ref.
Huabiao Film Awards
1999 (6th)	Female Coach & Male Player	Outstanding Actress	Won	
2003 (10th)	Taiwan Story	Outstanding Actress	Won	
Golden Rooster Awards
2003 (23rd)	Taiwan Story	Best Actress	Nominated	
2009 (27th)	And the Spring Comes	Best Actress	Won	
2011 (28th)	Lan	Best Directorial Debut	Nominated	
2017 (31st)	The Final Master	Best Supporting Actress	Nominated	
Hundred Flowers Film Awards
2012 (31st)	Love for Life	Best Supporting Actress	Nominated	
Golden Horse Awards
2011 (48th)	Love for Life	Best Supporting Actress	Nominated	
2015 (52nd)	The Final Master	Best Supporting Actress	Nominated	
Asian Film Awards
2009 (3rd)	And the Spring Comes	Best Actress	Nominated	
Chinese Film Media Awards
2002 (2nd)	The Gua Sha Treatment	Best Actress	Nominated	
2009 (9th)	And the Spring Comes	Best Actress	Nominated	
Golden Phoenix Awards
2001 (8th)	Society Award	—N/a	Won	
2005 (10th)	Society Award	—N/a	Won	
Macau International Movie Festival
2009 (1st)	Lan	Best Director	Won	
Rome International Film Festival
2007	And the Spring Comes	Best Actress	Won	
Chinese American Film Festival
2009 (5th)	And the Spring Comes	Best Actress	Won	

=== Television series awards ===
Year	Nominated work	Award	Result	Ref.
Magnolia Awards
2008 (14th)	Golden Anniversary	Best Actress	Won	
2013 (19th)	Mother Wants to Remarry	Best Actress	Nominated	
2019 (25th)	The Story of Zheng Yang Gate	Best Actress	Won	
Gold Panda Awards
2013 (12th)	Mother Wants to Remarry	Best Actress	Won	
Flying Apsaras Awards
1989 (9th)	Cliff Lilies	Outstanding Supporting Actress	Nominated	
1999 (19th)	Holding Hands	Outstanding Actress	Won	
2009	Golden Marriage	Outstanding Actress	Nominated	
2011	Happiness Knocks the Door	Outstanding Actress	Won	
Golden Eagle Awards
1999 (17th)	Holding Hands	Outstanding Actress	Won	
1999 (17th)	Holding Hands	Best Actress	Nominated	
2008 (24th)	Golden Anniversary	Best Actress	Won	
2020 (30th)	The Story of Zheng Yang Gate	Best Actress	Nominated	
China Golden Eagle TV Arts Festival
2008 (7th)	Golden Anniversary	Best Performing Arts Award	Won	
2008 (7th)	Golden Anniversary	Most Popular Actress	Won	
The Actors of China Award Ceremony
2019 (6th)	Best Actress (Sapphire Category)	The Story of Zheng Yang Gate	Nominated	
Huading Awards
2019 (26th)	Best Actress	The Story of Zheng Yang Gate	Nominated	
