= Zhang Ziyi =

Chinese actress and model (born 1979)

- 章子怡
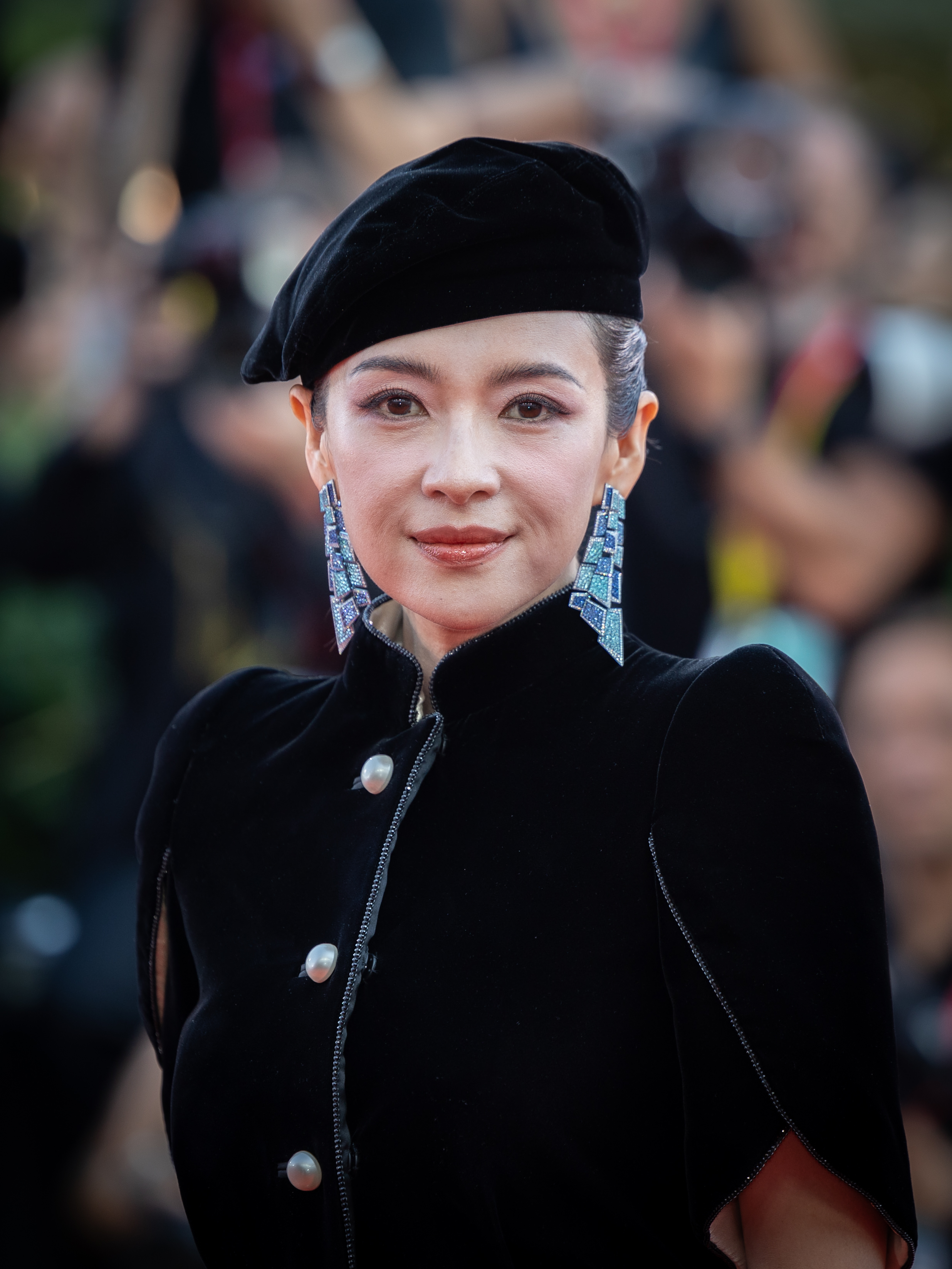
- Zhang at the 81st Venice International Film Festival
- Born: 9 February 1979 (age 47); Beijing, China
- Citizenship: Chinese
- Education: Central Academy of Drama
- Occupations: Actress; model; dancer
- Years active: 1995–present
- Political party: Zhi Gong
- Spouse: Wang Feng (m. 2015; div. 2023)
- Children: 2
- Relatives: Zhang Zinan (brother)
- Modeling information
- Height: 5 ft 5 in (165 cm)
- Hair color: Black
- Eye color: Brown
- Agency: Gersh

Chinese name
- Chinese: 章子怡
Transcriptions
Standard Mandarin
- Hanyu Pinyin: Zhāng Zǐyí
- Wade–Giles: Chang^{1} Tzŭ^{3}-i^{2}
- IPA: [ʈʂáŋ tsɹ̩̀.ǐ]
Yue: Cantonese
- Yale Romanization: Jēung Jí-yìh
- Jyutping: Zoeng^{1} Zi^{2}-ji^{4}
- IPA: [tsœŋ˥ tsi˧˥.ji˩]
Southern Min
- Hokkien POJ: Chiong Chú-î

Zhang Ziyi ([ʈʂáŋ tsɹ̩̀.ǐ]; Chinese: 章子怡; born 9 February 1979), sometimes credited as Ziyi Zhang, is a Chinese actress, known for playing independent and strong-willed characters. Born and raised in Beijing, Zhang was admitted to the Central Academy of Drama in 1996. That year, she made her acting debut in the television film Touching Starlight (1996). After her breakout role in Zhang Yimou's The Road Home (1999), which won her Best Actress at the 23rd Hundred Flowers Awards, she gained international fame for her performance in Ang Lee's wuxia film Crouching Tiger, Hidden Dragon (2000).

Zhang made her Hollywood debut as a villain in Rush Hour 2 (2001), followed by Memoirs of a Geisha (2005). She reunited with Zhang Yimou in the films Hero (2002) and House of Flying Daggers (2004). She collaborated with Wong Kar-wai on 2046 (2004), for which she won Best Actress at the 24th Hong Kong Film Awards, and on The Grandmaster (2013), for which she received 12 Best Actress awards, making her the most awarded Chinese actress for a single film.

Zhang is regarded as one of the Four Dan actresses of China. From 2004 to 2010, she ranked in the Top 5 of Forbes China Celebrity 100 list every year. In 2008, she was awarded with the Outstanding Contribution to Chinese Cinema award at the 11th Shanghai International Film Festival. One of the most recognisable Asian actresses in the world, Time called her "China's gift to Hollywood" in 2005. The same year, Time named her one of the 100 Most Influential People. In 2013, she received the French Cultural Order of the Ordre des Arts et des Lettres. In October 2026, Zhang received an honorary professorship from Hong Kong Baptist University.

== Early life ==
Zhang Ziyi was born in Beijing to Zhang Yuanxiao, an accountant and later economist, and Li Zhousheng, a kindergarten teacher. She has an older brother, Zhang Zinan, who was her manager at the beginning of her career. Zhang began her nine-year study of folk dance when she was 8; at 11, she joined the Affiliated Secondary School of Beijing Dance Academy at her parents' suggestion. While at this boarding school, she noticed how mean the other girls were to each other while competing for status amongst the teachers. Zhang disliked the attitudes of her peers and teachers so much that, on one occasion, she ran away from the school. In 1994, she won the performance award in the National Taoli Cup Dance Competition. She also appeared in a handful of TV commercials. In 1996, Zhang entered the Central Academy of Drama, majoring in acting.

== Career ==
=== 1996–2000: Early career ===
In her freshman year, Zhang made her acting debut in the television film Touching Starlight. In 1998, Zhang was offered her first major role by director Zhang Yimou in his film The Road Home, which would win the Silver Bear prize at the 2000 Berlin International Film Festival. Zhang plays a country girl in love with the town's young teacher. She won the Best Actress Award at the 2000 Hundred Flowers Awards for her performance.

=== 2000–06: Wuxia epics and international breakthrough ===
Zhang rose to international fame in 2000 with her role as Yu Jiaolong in Ang Lee's re-visioned wuxia martial arts film Crouching Tiger, Hidden Dragon. Zhang plays a young Manchu noblewoman who has secretly learned martial arts and runs off to become a wandering swordswoman rather than commit to an arranged marriage. This role won her the Most Promising Actress award at the Chicago Film Critics Association Awards and Best Supporting Actress awards from the Independent Spirit Awards, as well as Toronto Film Critics Association Awards. The movie's success in the US and Europe helped her break into Hollywood.

Zhang then appeared in her first American film, Rush Hour 2 (2001) opposite Jackie Chan and Chris Tucker. On playing her first villain role, Zhang expressed that "the opportunity to sort of try and analyze the psyche of the character and get to know and pull out emotions I've never had to utilize before...was very exciting."

In 2002, Zhang co-starred in Hero alongside Jet Li, Maggie Cheung and Tony Leung, directed by her early mentor Zhang Yimou. The film was a huge success in the English-speaking world and was nominated for an Oscar and a Golden Globe award in the category of Best Foreign Language Film. She then signed on to film an avant-garde drama film Purple Butterfly (2003), which competed in the 2003 Cannes Film Festival.

Zhang went back to the wuxia martial arts genre in House of Flying Daggers (2004), again by Zhang Yimou, where she starred along Takeshi Kaneshiro and Andy Lau. She plays the blind dancing girl Mei, who despite the lack of eyesight, is a skilled fighter. In preparation for the part, Zhang spent two months living with an actual blind girl. Her performance earned her a Best Actress nomination at the BAFTA Awards. She also featured on the House of Flying Daggers soundtrack with her own musical rendition of the ancient Chinese poem Jia Rén Qu (佳人曲, The Beauty Song).

Zhang next starred in Wong Kar-wai's romantic drama film 2046 (2004), which featured many top Chinese actors and actresses. Critics praise Zhang for her "expressive" body language that was combined with her "reserved and complex emotions" in performance as a struggling prostitute. Zhang won Best Actress awards at the Hong Kong Film Critics' Award and Hong Kong Film Academy Award.

In 2005, Zhang featured in the critically acclaimed film Jasmine Women, adapted from Su Tong's novel titled Women's Lives. She won Best Actress at the Golden Rooster Awards for her performance. Next came Princess Raccoon (2005), directed by Japan's Seijun Suzuki, which premiered at the Cannes Film Festival. For her role, Zhang took two weeks of singing and dancing lessons in Japan. Zhang played the lead role of Sayuri in the American film adaptation based on the international bestseller Memoirs of a Geisha. Controversy arose in China about having a Chinese woman portray a prominent Japanese geisha in a film set during the height of Japanese imperialist aggression against China in World War II. Nonetheless, the film was a box office hit in the West. For the role, Zhang was nominated for the Golden Globe Award for Best Actress – Motion Picture Drama, the BAFTA Award for Best Actress in a Leading Role, and the Screen Actors Guild Award for Outstanding Performance by a Female Actor in a Leading Role. On 27 June 2005, Zhang accepted an invitation to join the Academy of Motion Picture Arts and Sciences (AMPAS), placing her among the ranks of those who are able to vote on the Academy Awards. In May 2006, Zhang was a jury member of Feature Films at the 2006 Cannes Film Festival. Zhang returned to China in 2006 for the Chinese wuxia film The Banquet, directed by Feng Xiaogang. The film is a loose adaptation of William Shakespeare's Hamlet.

In the July 2006 issue of Interview magazine, Zhang spoke of her Hollywood career:

After Crouching Tiger, Hidden Dragon I got a lot of offers, but I turned them down because they were all victim roles—poor girls sold to America to be a wife or whatever. I know I have the ability to go deeper, to take on more original roles than that. That's why I really appreciated Geisha, because it allowed us to show the world what kind of actors we are and what kind of characters we can play—not just action, kick-ass parts.

=== 2007–12: Hollywood and China ===
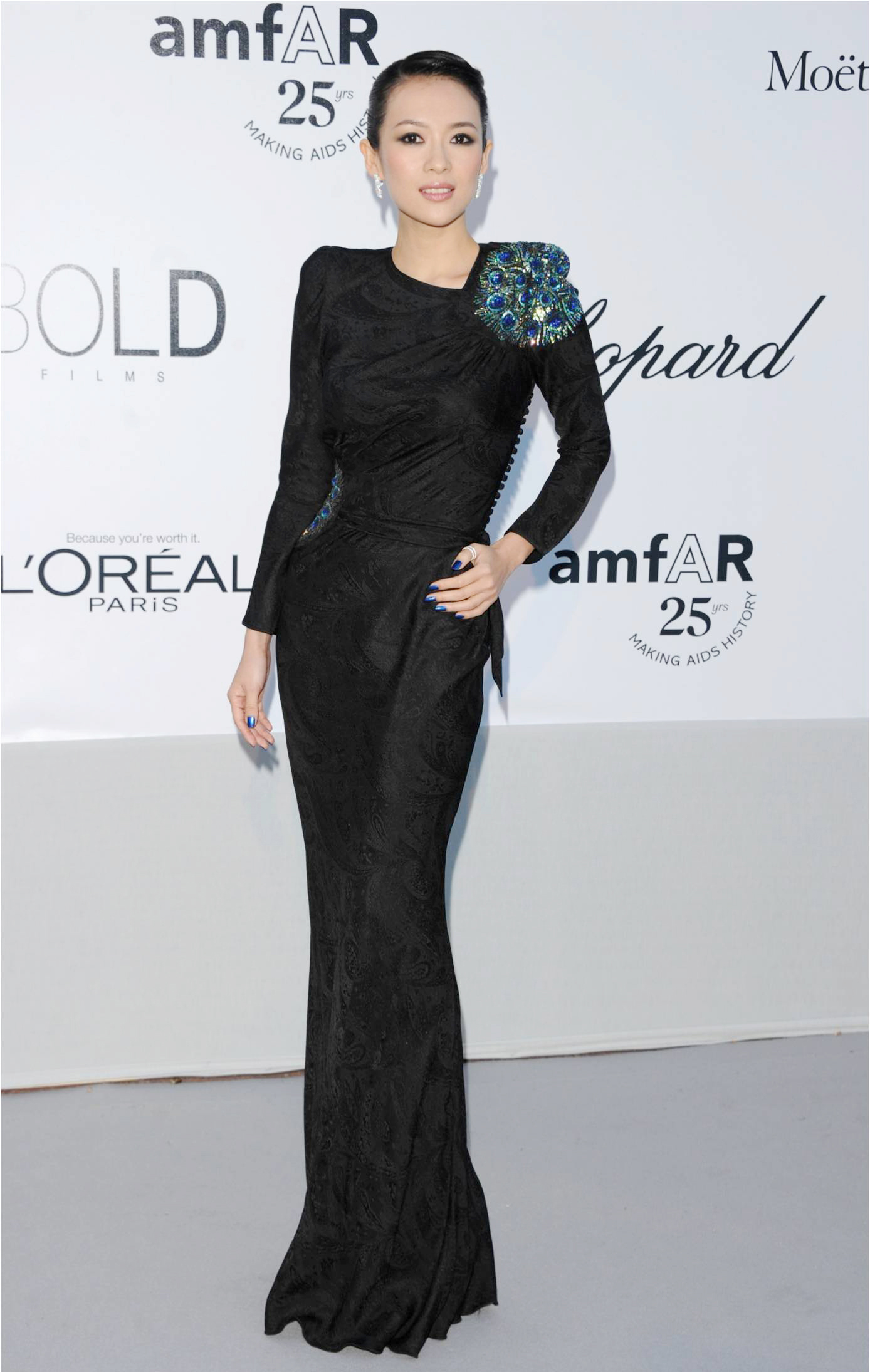
Zhang in 2011 at the amfAR 25th Anniversary Gala Celebration

In 2007, Zhang performed the voice of Karai in the American animated film TMNT (2007). In the same year, Zhang starred alongside Liu Ye and Ge You in the first-ever opening short for the Chinese academy awards (Golden Rooster Awards) where director Dayyan Eng got top stars to spoof the action-movie genre in a humorous send-up on national TV in China.

In Forever Enthralled (2008), which tells the story of legendary Peking opera actor Mei Lanfang, Zhang appears in the second act as Mei's lover Meng Xiaodong. The Hollywood Reporter praised her performance as "confident and passion", giving the romance a sparkle.

Her next American film was Horsemen (2009), where she starred opposite Dennis Quaid. Back in China, she played the titular character in romantic comedy Sophie's Revenge (2009); a comic book artist seeking to punish her unfaithful boyfriend. She then starred alongside Aaron Kwok in the AIDS-themed film Love for Life (2011).

In 2012, Zhang starred next to Cecilia Cheung and Jang Dong-gun in the Chinese-Korean co-production Dangerous Liaisons, an adaptation of the French novel Les Liaisons dangereuses, narrating Shanghai of the 1930s. Zhang was reportedly paid 20 million RMB (approximately $3.5 million) for the role. The same year, she was cast in the coming-of-age film Forever Young directed and written by Li Fangfang. The film premiered in January 2018.

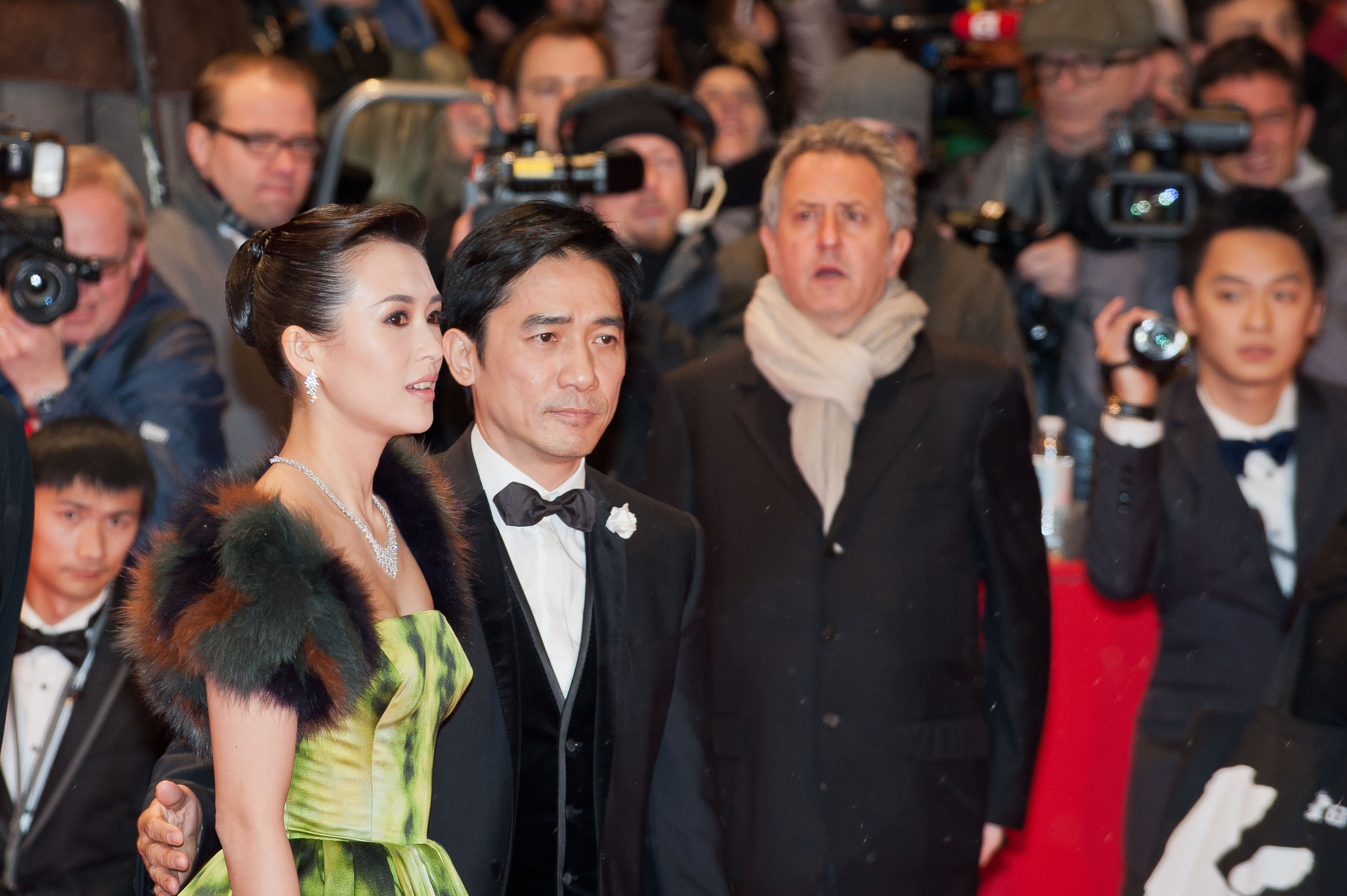
Zhang and Tony Leung at the premiere of The Grandmaster at the 2013 Berlin International Film Festival

=== 2013–17 ===
In 2013, Zhang received the Ordre des Arts et des Lettres as a Chevalier for her significant contributions to the film industry.

Zhang reunited with Wong Kar-wai and Tony Leung for The Grandmaster (2013), which also marks her return to the martial arts genre after 7 years since The Banquet (2006). The film was China's submission to the Academy Awards for Best Foreign-Language Picture. Critics praise Zhang's portrayal of Gong'Er as the "best performance she's ever delivered in the history of her career." which led to her winning several "Best Actress" trophies across Asia. The same year, she reprised her role as Sophie in My Lucky Star, a sequel to Sophie's Revenge. Described as Zhang's "breakthrough comedy role", the film topped Chinese box office on the week of its release.

In 2014, Zhang starred in John Woo's romantic epic The Crossing, based on the true story of the Taiping steamer collision and follows six characters and their intertwining love stories in Taiwan and Shanghai during the 1930s. Zhang plays a poor illiterate woman waiting for her soldier lover in 1930's Shanghai.

In 2015, Zhang produced her third film Oh My God, which stars Zhang Yixing and Li Xiaolu. She made a cameo appearance in the film. Zhang next starred in romance anthology film Run for Love and crime epic The Wasted Times.

=== 2018–present: Hollywood epics, directorial debut and small-screen debut ===
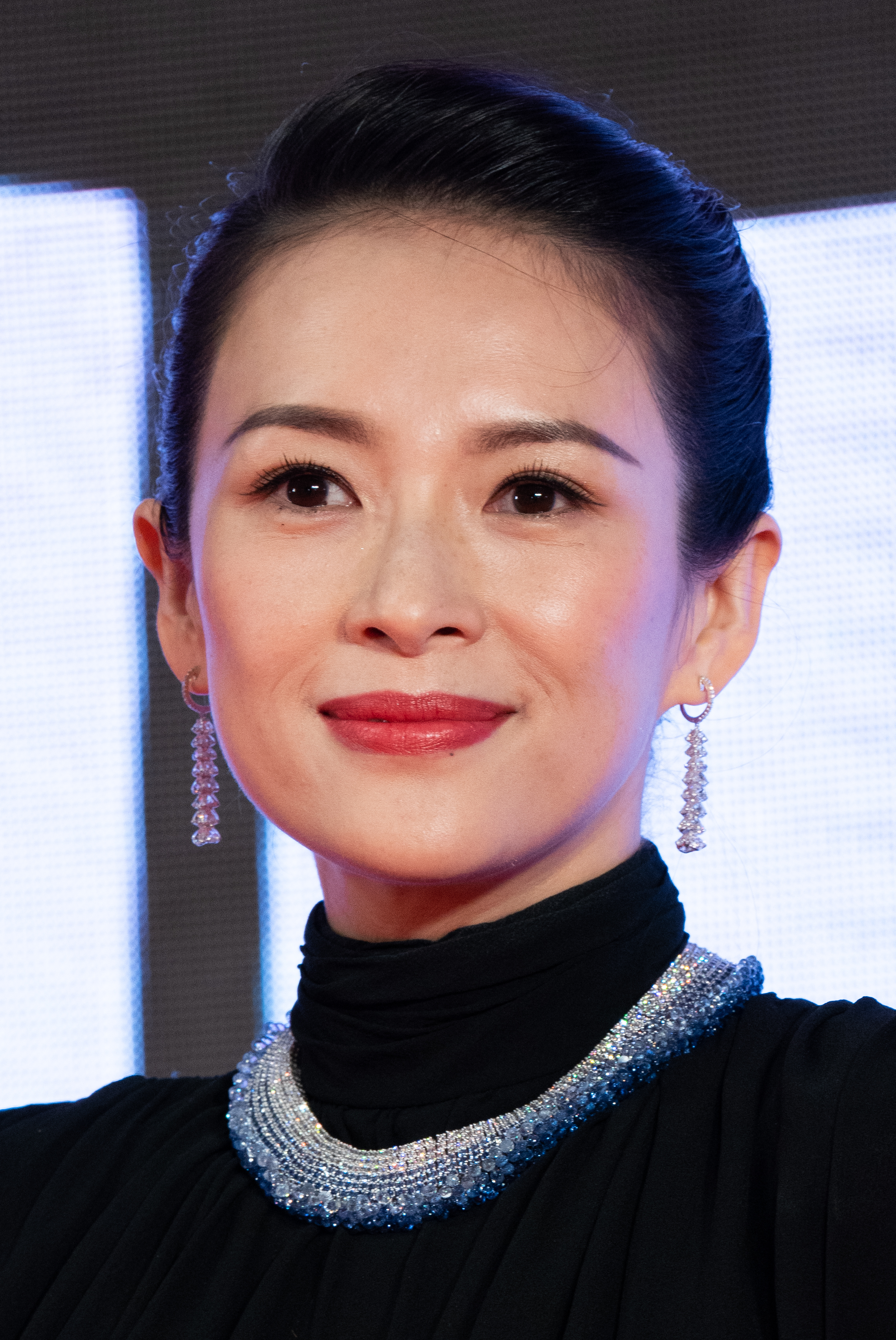
Zhang at the Opening Ceremony of the Tokyo International Film Festival 2019

In 2016, Zhang was cast in J. J. Abrams's science fiction thriller The Cloverfield Paradox, which premiered in 2018.

In 2017, Zhang was cast in the monster film Godzilla: King of the Monsters, playing a prominent character.

In 2018, Zhang was cast in her first television series, Rebel Princess.

In 2019, Zhang starred in the adventure drama film The Climbers.

In 2021, Zhang made her directorial debut with a short titled "Shi" (Poem), one of the four stand-alone short tales of the film My Country, My Parents. She won the best new director award at the 2022 Media Honors for the film.

== Ambassadorship and representation ==
- Spokesperson for "Care for Children"
- Global Ambassador for China's Special Olympics
- Image Ambassador for first Beijing International Film Festival
- Ambassador for the ScreenSingapore 2011 film festival
- Friendship Ambassador for the Chinese Film Days in Romania
- Image Ambassador for the Macao Film Festival
- Global Ambassador for the Children of China Pediatrics Foundation (CCPF)
- Ambassador for Clé de Peau Beauté
- Global Ambassador for Jaeger-LeCoultre since July 2025
- Global Ambassador for Tiffany in 2025

=== Endorsements ===
Zhang was the first Chinese woman to be appointed as an Emporio Armani ambassador, which she served from 2009 to 2010. She also served as regional ambassadors for Mercedes-Benz, Garnier, Precious Platinum; and global ambassadors for Maybelline, Visa, TAG Heuer, Omega SA and Clé de Peau Beauté. Zhang was featured on the "BoF 500" list. Since 2019, she became the global ambassador for Chopard. In 2025, she was appointed global ambassador for Jaeger-LeCoultre and TIffany.

== Public image and influence ==
Zhang is regarded as one of the Four Dan actresses of China, alongside Zhao Wei, Zhou Xun, and Xu Jinglei. One of the most recognisable Asian actresses in the Western world, Time called her "China's gift to Hollywood" in 2005. The same year, Time named her one of the 100 Most Influential People. In 2021, Douglas Parkes of South China Morning Post (SCMP) described Zhang as "surely the most important Chinese actress of her generation".

Having starred in some of the most celebrated martial arts films of all time, Zhang is widely considered one of the greatest martial arts stars in the history of cinema.

== Personal life ==
Zhang obtained Hong Kong residency in 2007 through the Quality Migrant Admission Scheme for her contribution to the local film industry. She is an admirer and collector of the works of the Chinese contemporary artist Shen Jingdong. She is a member of the Chinese Communist Party-controlled China Zhi Gong Party.

From 2004 to 2006, Zhang was in a relationship with Eric Fok Kai Shan, an heir of the Fok family in Hong Kong. Following this, Zhang entered into a relationship with Israeli American venture capitalist Aviv "Vivi" Nevo in 2007, which led to an engagement; however, the couple parted ways in 2010. From late 2011 to 2013, Zhang was in a relationship with Chinese host Sa Beining.

Zhang began dating Chinese rock musician Wang Feng from mid-2013 and married him in May 2015, despite strong opposition from her elder brother Zhang Zinan. They have two children: a daughter (born December 2015) and a son (born January 2020), both born in the United States. On 23 October 2023, Zhang and Wang announced their divorce on Weibo. According to Zhuo Wei, Zhang's marriage broke down after her brother discovered Wang's affair.

== Defamation and donation controversy ==
=== Defamation cases ===
In December 2009, an Omega ad featuring Zhang near her home in Beijing was splashed with black ink. A month later, Zhao Xinyu, socialite and daughter-in-law of military leader Ye Jianying, contacted the tabloid magazine Total Entertainment and claimed the ink-splashing had stemmed from Zhang's affair with real estate tycoon Yu Guoxiang. Zhang sued Total Entertainment for defamation the day after the magazine report and Vivi issued a statement supporting Zhang. In July, the owner of the magazine settled the case with Zhang and issued an apology. In August, the magazine was shut down.

In 2012, an American website Boxun falsely reported that Zhang was paid $100 million to sleep with top Chinese officials. Zhang sued Boxun in a US court for defamation. In December 2013, Boxun settled the case after agreeing to pay an undisclosed amount to Zhang and issue a front-page apology. Zhang also sued Next Media in Hong Kong and Taiwan over the similar reports by the group's two titles, Apple Daily and Next Magazine, both citing Boxun. She won the case in Hong Kong but lost in Taiwan.

=== Donation controversy ===
In mid-January 2010, an online post reported that Zhang failed to honor her pledge to donate one million yuan ($146,000) to relief charities in the aftermath of the May 2008 Sichuan earthquake, as she donated 840,000 yuan, or 160,000 yuan less than promised. Online, it was noted that the funds she raised at the Cannes Film Festival for the earthquake were unaccounted for, leading to allegations of donation fraud. Zhang denied the accusations of charity fraud, but admitted to inexperience when she organized the donation drive. Her agent, Ji Lingling, claimed responsibility for the mistake and donated another 160,000 yuan to earthquake victims, bringing Zhang's total contribution up to one million yuan.

== Filmography ==
=== Film ===
Year	English title	Role	Notes	Ref.
1996	Touching Starlight	Chen Wei		
1999	The Road Home	Zhao Di		
2000	Crouching Tiger, Hidden Dragon	Jen Yu		
2001	Rush Hour 2	Hu Li	Hollywood debut	
2001	The Legend of Zu	Joy	Special appearance	
2001	Musa	Princess Bu-yong		
2002	Hero	Moon		
2003	Purple Butterfly	Cynthia		
2003	My Wife is a Gangster 2	Gangster boss	Cameo	
2004	House of Flying Daggers	Mei		
2004	2046	Bai Ling		
2004	Jasmine Women	Mo / Li / Hua		
2005	Princess Raccoon	Princess Tanuki		
2005	Memoirs of a Geisha	Chiyo Sakamoto / Sayuri Nitta		
2006	The Banquet	Wan		
2007	TMNT	Karai	Voice	
2008	Forever Enthralled	Meng Xiaodong		
2009	Horsemen	Kristen		
2009	Sophie's Revenge	Sophie		
2009	The Founding of a Republic	Gong Peng	Cameo	
2011	Love for Life	Qinqin		
2012	Dangerous Liaisons	Du Fenyu		
2013	The Grandmaster	Gong Er		
2013	Better and Better	Herself	Cameo	
2013	My Lucky Star	Sophie		
2014	The Crossing Part 1	Yu Zhen		
2015	The Crossing Part 2	Yu Zhen		
2015	Where's the Dragon?	Phoenix	Voice	
2015	Oh My God	Auntie	Cameo	
2016	Run for Love	Su Leqi	Segment: "So Long, My Love"	
2016	The Wasted Times	Xiao Liu		
2018	Forever Young	Wang Minjia		
2018	The Cloverfield Paradox	Tam		
2019	Godzilla: King of the Monsters	Dr. Ilene Chen / Dr. Ling Chen		
2019	The Climbers	Xu Ying		
2021	My Country, My Parents	Mother	Segment: "Poem"	
2022	Avatar: The Way of Water	Ronal	Voice; Mandarin dub	
2023	The Volunteers: To the War	Tang Sheng		
2024	She's Got No Name	Zhan Zhou	Also producer	
2025	Avatar: Fire and Ash	Ronal	Voice; Mandarin dub	

=== Television series ===
Year	English title	Role
2021	The Rebel Princess	Wang Xuan

=== Reality shows ===
Year	English title	Original title	Role/Ref.
2009	Zhang Ziyi's Oman	跟著章子怡去旅遊: 阿曼	
2013	The X Factor: Zhongguo Zui Qiang Yin	中国最强音	Judge
2017	Birth of an Actor	演员的诞生	Mentor
2018	I Am an Actor	我就是演员	Mentor
2019	Viva La Romance	妻子的浪漫旅行	
2020	I Am an Actor 3	我就是演员3	Mentor

=== Music video appearances ===
Year	Song title	Artist
1996	"Cherish (珍惜)"	Xie Xiaodong
1996	"Women Afraid of the Dark (怕黑的女人)"	Tian Zhen
2008	"You Understand My Love (你懂我的爱)"	Leon Lai & Zhang Ziyi
2013	"Fly Freely (自由飞翔)"	Yin Xishui & Zhang Ziyi
2013	"Love a Little (爱一点)"	Wang Leehom & Zhang Ziyi
2014	"Magic"	Coldplay
2015	"Nowhere to Belong (无处安放)"	Wang Feng

== Discography ==
Year	English title	Original title	Notes
2004	"The Beauty Song"	佳人曲	Soundtrack of House of Flying Daggers
2008		天女散花	
2008	"You Understand My Love"	你懂我的爱	Soundtrack of Forever Enthralled with Leon Lai
2011	"Always Here"	一直都在	Soundtrack of Love for Life with Aaron Kwok
2013	"Love a Little"	爱一点	Soundtrack of My Lucky Star with Wang Leehom
2013	"Dreams Grow Up"	梦想长大了	

== Awards and nominations ==
=== Other honors ===
In 2005, Zhang was listed in Time's World's 100 Most Influential People. They called her "China's Gift to Hollywood".

In 2008, she was awarded with the "Outstanding Contribution to Chinese Cinema" at the 11th Shanghai International Film Festival.

In 2010, she was named "Actress of the Decade" by CineAsia. She previously won "Star of Tomorrow prize" back in 1999.

In 2013, Zhang received the Order of Arts and Letter as a Dame at the Ordre des Arts et des Lettres Awards.

=== Forbes China Celebrity 100 ===
Year	Rank	Ref.
2004	2nd	
2005	2nd	
2006	3rd	
2007	4th	
2008	5th	
2009	2nd	
2010	5th	
2011	7th	
2012	14th	
2013	5th	
2014	5th	
2015	21st	
2019	54th	
2020	78th	
