= Peacock (2005 film) =

- Promotional poster for Peacock
- Traditional Chinese: 孔雀
- Simplified Chinese: 孔雀
- Hanyu Pinyin: kǒngquè
- Directed by: Gu Changwei
- Written by: Li Qiang
- Produced by: Dong Ping; Er Yong; Gu Changwei
- Starring: Zhang Jingchu; Feng Li; Lu Yulai
- Cinematography: Yang Shu
- Edited by: Sha Liu; Tao Yan
- Music by: Dou Peng
- Distributed by: Asian Union Film
- Release date: February 18, 2005
- Running time: 144 minutes
- Country: China
- Language: Mandarin

Peacock (Chinese: 孔雀; pinyin: kǒng què) is a 2005 film directed by Gu Changwei, written by Li Qiang. This is Gu's first film as director after a lengthy career as a cinematographer for some of China's top directors. The film premiered simultaneously in both China and in competition at the 2005 Berlin International Film Festival, going on to receive Berlin's Jury Grand Prix Silver Bear.

The film was released with three versions: 136 minutes Chinese release, 141 minutes Japanese release and 144 minutes German release.

== Plot ==
The story is set in the late 1970s and early 1980s, in a small town in Mainland China. A middle-aged couple has three children. The eldest son is obese and mentally challenged, a social outcast, and is constantly teased by others. The second child, the daughter, is energetic and independent and isn't afraid of doing anything to pursue her dreams or to survive. The youngest child is an introverted, quiet boy who is ashamed of his older brother and tries to break away from his family's misery.

The story is broken into three sections, with each focusing on one of the siblings. The story begins with the daughter, Weihong. The mother arranges for her to start work at a nursery but a few days later she drops a child and loses her job. After watching army officers parachuting from a plane, she wonders to the field where they land. She develops a crush on one of the male officers and decides to enlist at her school. In order to get his attention, she steals her mother's money to buy him gifts but ultimately does not give it to him after seeing him with her other classmates. She does not enroll into the military and becomes depressed after seeing other enlisted men and women. In order to recreate her dreams, she knits a makeshift parachute and attaches it to her bike, which she rides down the street before being stopped by her mother. Her action draws the interest of Guozi, a boisterous factory worker. After some time, Wei Hong is working at a factory washing pharmaceutical bottles and sees Guozi with her parachute attached to his bike. They arrange for a meeting in the woods and Guozi suggestively asks for something in return for the parachute but backs out before anything happens. Weihong continues to wonder around searching for purpose and meets an old man playing the accordion, whom she develops a father-daughter relationship with. However, the old man's children suspect her of taking advantage of him and physically assault her while she is at the factory. Through her parents' connections, she is introduced to a district leader's driver and they marry, on the condition that she is given a new job. Before she leaves with her husband, she gives her older brother a watch and bids farewell to her family.

The story then shifts back to the family eating at a table and this time follows the events of the older brother, Weiguo. He is often bullied because of his disability and has to change jobs. However, his parents dote on him, to the chagrin of the younger brother who has to look after him. At a bathhouse, someone sets off a firecracker in Weiguo's cigarette and he has a seizure. Weihong asks for Guozi to get revenge by beating up the bully. One day, when Weiguo shows up at school to bring Weiqiang an umbrella, he is accused of being a peeping tom after he stands outside the girls' bathroom. He is beaten by a group of boys and Weiqiang is also publicly ridiculed. Out of contempt, Weiqiang denounces Weiguo in front of everyone and stabs his leg with an umbrella. Weiqiang is continually ostracized by his classmates because of what happened except for one girl who helps him once out of pity. When the girl later turns her back on Weiqiang, he decides to get rid of Weiguo by putting rat poison in his drink at night. However, Weihong finds out and stops him. The next morning, the mother reveals that she knows about what happened last night by making a duck drink the rat poison in front of the family and making them watch it convulse and die. Weiqiang realizes his mistake, and tries to make it up to Weiguo by buying him a meal and baby duck. After previous attempts to make a match for Weiguo, the parents arrange for him to meet a girl with a physical disability. They set up a small food stall, which becomes successful.

Finally, the story returns to the family eating at the table and Weiqiang becomes the focus. He is infatuated with the girl who helped him earlier on. After his father discovers his drawings of naked women in his textbook, he is almost kicked out. Weiqiang leaves on his own accord and goes missing for days. Guozi spots Weiqiang one day and, together with Weihong, they follow him to an elderly care home and find him working there. Weiqiang then gets on a train the next day and leaves the town. When Weihong is asked where his brother has gone, she imagines he has accomplished her dream of becoming an army officer.

A few years later, the parents are shown eating at the table. Weihong moves back in after she has separated from her husband. Weiguo and his wife are still continuing their business, which has attracted many customers. Weiqiang also returns one day with a wife and son. He has lost a finger but he does not explain this to his family. He does not work and instead relies on his wife as a stage singer to support him. Weihong spots the army officer she used to idolise in the streets but finds that he has become a regular person wearing simple clothing. In the ending scene, Weihong is shown to have remarried and all three siblings visit a peacock enclosure with their families, making remarks about why the peacock won't open its feathers. Only when they have left does the peacock opens its feathers.

== Cast ==
- Zhang Jingchu as Gao Weihong, sister; a young woman who wishes to join the local paratrooper unit of the People's Liberation Army.
- Feng Li as Gao Weiguo, elder brother.
- Lu Yulai as Gao Weigiang, younger brother.
- Huang Meiying as mother of the Gao family.
- Zhao Yiwei as father of the Gao family.
- Liu Lei as Guo Zi
- Wang Lan as Jin Zhi, the wife of Weiguo in an arranged marriage.
- Yu Xiaowei as Paratrooper, a soldier who lands one day in a field near the Gao family's home.
- Shi Junhui as Xiaowang, the driver for a local official who married Weihong.
- An Jing as Zhang Lina, a singer and wife of the youngest sibling, Weigiang
- Liu Guonan as Zhang Xi
- Wang Yingjie as Godfather, an accordion player who strikes up a friendship with Weihong.
- Zong Ping as a teacher
- Yang Meng as Tao Meiling
- Gu Changwei as a blind man
