= Gu Changwei =

Chinese film director (born 1957)

- Born: 12 December 1957 (age 68); Xi'an, Shaanxi, China
- Occupations: Cinematographer, film director
- Years active: 1980s-present
- Spouse: Jiang Wenli
- Awards: Silver Berlin Bear-Jury Grand Prix; 2005 Peacock; Silver Frog; 1993 Farewell My ConcubineGolden Horse Awards – Best Cinematography; 1994 In the Heat of the Sun Golden Rooster Awards – Best Cinematography; 1988 King of the Children & Red Sorghum

Chinese name
- Traditional Chinese: 顧長衛
- Simplified Chinese: 顾长卫
Transcriptions
Standard Mandarin
- Hanyu Pinyin: Gù Chángwèi

Gu Changwei (born 12 December 1957) is a Chinese cinematographer and film director. Gu was born in Xi'an, Shaanxi in the People's Republic of China.

== Career ==
Gu Changwei began his cinematic career in the now legendary 1982 class of the Beijing Film Academy, today known as the Fifth Generation. Trained as a cinematographer, Gu was assigned to the Xi'an Film Studio after graduation, where he served as a primary collaborator with classmates Chen Kaige and Zhang Yimou on their early films, notably King of the Children (for Chen Kaige) and Red Sorghum (for Zhang Yimou), both in 1987. Since then, Gu has worked with both men on multiple occasions, including on Chen's magnum opus, 1993's Farewell My Concubine. Like fellow cinematographer Zhao Fei, Gu has had the opportunity to work with major American directors as well, with Tony Drazan, in his filmed adaptation of Hurlyburly and most notably with Robert Altman, on his film The Gingerbread Man (1997).

=== Directing ===
Beginning in 2005, Gu Changwei branched out into film direction with his debut Peacock, a three-hour-long epic about a small family in the 1970s and 1980s. The film was well received and won the Jury Grand Prix-Silver Bear at the 2005 Berlin International Film Festival. His sophomore feature, And the Spring Comes, was released in 2007.

== Filmography ==
=== As cinematographer ===
Year	English Title	Chinese Title	Director	Notes
1987	Red Sorghum	红高粱	Zhang Yimou	
1987	King of the Children	孩子王	Chen Kaige	
1989	Codename Cougar	代号美洲豹	Zhang Yimou	
1990	Ju Dou	菊豆	Zhang Yimou	
1991	Life on a String	边走边唱	Chen Kaige	
1993	Farewell My Concubine	霸王别姬	Chen Kaige	Nominated- Academy Award for Best Cinematography
1993	The Trail	大路	Zhou Xiaowen	
1994	In the Heat of the Sun	阳光灿烂的日子	Jiang Wen	
1995	Warrior Lanling		Sherwood Hu	
1997	The Gingerbread Man	NA	Robert Altman	
1998	Last Chance Love		Ankie Lau	
1998	Hurlyburly	NA	Anthony Drazan	
2000	Devils on the Doorstep	鬼子来了	Jiang Wen	
2000	Autumn in New York	NA	Joan Chen	
2005	"Song Song and Little Cat"	NA	John Woo	Segment in All the Invisible Children

=== As film director ===
Year	English Title	Chinese Title	Notes
2005	Peacock	孔雀	Jury Grand Prix at the Berlin International Film Festival
2007	And the Spring Comes	立春	Best Actress award at the Rome Film Festival
2009	Never Abandon, Never Give Up		Short film for the International Labour Organization's ILOAIDS program
2011	Love for Life	最爱	-
2014	Love on the Cloud	微爱之渐入佳境	
