= Unknown Pleasures (film) =

- Film poster
- Directed by: Jia Zhangke
- Written by: Jia Zhangke
- Produced by: Shozo Ichiyama; Li Kit Ming; Masayuki Mori
- Starring: Zhao Weiwei; Wu Qiong; Zhao Tao
- Cinematography: Nelson Yu Lik-wai
- Edited by: Chow Keung
- Distributed by: United States: New Yorker Films; United Kingdom: Artificial Eye
- Release date: May 23, 2002
- Running time: 113 minutes
- Country: China
- Languages: Jin Chinese; Mandarin Chinese

Unknown Pleasures (Chinese: 任逍遥; pinyin: Rèn xiāo yáo; lit. 'Free from all constraints') is a 2002 Chinese film directed by Jia Zhangke, starring Wu Qiong, Zhao Weiwei and Zhao Tao as three disaffected youths living in Datong in 2001, part of the new "Birth Control" generation. Fed on a steady diet of popular culture, both Western and Chinese, the characters of Unknown Pleasures represent a new breed in the People's Republic of China, one detached from reality through the screen of media and the internet.

The film was a co-production of four countries: Japan's Office Kitano and T-Mark, China's Hu Tong Communications, France's Lumen Films, and South Korea's E-Pictures. It competed for the Palme d'Or at the 2002 Cannes Film Festival but would eventually lose to director Roman Polanski's Holocaust film, The Pianist.

Unknown Pleasures is Jia's third feature film after 1997's Xiao Wu and 2000s Platform, and it is sometimes considered the final film of an informal trilogy on a modern China in transition. The film also marked Jia's last production outside of the Chinese studio system. With 2004's The World, Jia would work with the approval of the state film bureaucrats (SARFT).

== Plot ==
Unknown Pleasures follows three disaffected, aimless young people in the industrial city of Datong in China's Shanxi province throughout 2001. Nineteen-year-old Bin Bin (Zhao Weiwei) lives with his mother, an adherent of the Falun Gong, in a small apartment near Datong's textile mill. Bin Bin's best friend, the reckless Xiao Ji (Wu Qiong), lives in an even smaller apartment with his father, and spends his time riding his motorbike around the city. The two friends eventually meet Qiao Qiao, a young singer and dancer working for the Mongolian King Liquor company as a spokesmodel. Xiao Ji immediately becomes enamored with Qiao Qiao, which gets him in trouble with Qiao Qiao's boyfriend, the loan shark and local thug, Qiao San (Li Zhubin).

For much of the early parts of the film, the three characters seem to follow an aimless lifestyle. Unemployed, Bin Bin meets with his girlfriend to watch television on most days, while Xiao Ji seems to do nothing at all aside from flirt with Qiao Qiao. When an explosion rocks part of the city's textile mill, the characters are briefly pushed into action. Qiao Qiao, desperate to get her injured father into the hospital, has Xiao Ji rush to the bank in order to withdraw ¥2000 for the entry fee. As thanks, she takes Xiao Ji and Bin Bin first to lunch, where Xiao Ji references watching Quentin Tarantino's Pulp Fiction, and then to a discotheque. While dancing, Xiao Ji is led away by Qiao San's men, who humiliate and beat him. Enraged, Xiao Ji tries to avenge himself but is stopped by Bin Bin, who tells him that Qiao San keeps a gun on his person. Undeterred, Xiao Ji continues to pursue Qiao Qiao, who is eventually abandoned by her boyfriend. When the two young people end up in a hotel room, Qiao Qiao tries to explain to Xiao Ji the philosophy of Zhuangzi who, in his poem Ren Xiao Yao, "philosophized that we should do what feels good." Soon afterward, it is learned that Qiao San has died in a car accident. The film implies that Qiao Qiao nevertheless leaves Xiao Ji and is last seen wearing a blue wig as a prostitute in a run-down club.

Bin Bin, meanwhile, following the advice of his mother, tries to join the PLA, but is rejected when it is discovered that he suffers from hepatitis. Shattered, he borrows ¥1500 from a small-time crook Xiao Wu (Wang Hongwei). Bin Bin uses the money to purchase a cell phone for his girlfriend, but when she tries to get close to him, he refuses, and notes only that there is no future for him anymore.

Bin Bin and Xiao Ji decide to rob a bank, as they have seen so often in American films. Attaching a fake bomb to Bin Bin's chest, Xiao Ji drives Bin Bin to a China Construction Bank, where the latter is immediately arrested. Fleeing, Xiao Ji drives his motorbike down the highway until it breaks down and he hitches a ride to locations unknown. Bin Bin is left at the police station, where an officer informs him that robbery is a capital crime. The film ends as the police officer forces Bin Bin to stand and sing. Bin Bin chooses to sing Ren Xiao Yao, a pop song about being spiritually free through love.

== Production ==
"At first it was the bleak and lonely buildings that attracted me. When I saw the streets filled with lonely, directionless people, I became interested in them."

— Jia Zhangke, 2002

The idea for Unknown Pleasures first came from Jia Zhangke's short film, In Public, his entry in a documentary competition sponsored by the 2001 Jeonju International Film Festival held in South Korea. The competition (which also drew entries from Tsai Ming-liang and John Akomfrah) required that the shorts be filmed entirely in digital video. While Jia had originally intended only to film the derelict factories in Datong, the filming with digital video would soon inspire the director to begin production of Unknown Pleasures. As Jia stated at a news conference: "At first it was the bleak and lonely buildings that attracted me. When I saw the streets filled with lonely, directionless people, I became interested in them."

Unknown Pleasures was filmed using digital video in only nineteen days, as a result of time and budgetary constraints. In his production notes, Jia claims that the use of digital video produced a slight color discrepancy that lent itself to the tone he wanted the film to take. Additionally, the use of digital cameras meant a more streamlined production and greater ease of movement. As a result, Jia was able to begin shooting a mere three weeks after developing the idea for the film.

According to Jia, the final scene of Xiao Ji riding down the highway as a thunderstorm approaches would not have been possible had traditional film cameras been used. But because of the flexibility of digital video, Jia Zhangke was able to capture the scene with the storm and in the director's words, creates a moment where the "environment is complementing [Xiao Ji's] internal feelings." At the same time, use of digital video restricted Jia. He noted in an interview shortly after the release of the film that he and cinematographer Yu Lik-wai were forced to cut back on exterior scenes due to the drawbacks of filming on digital video in sunlight.

=== Creative team ===
The cast and crew of the film consisted of a mix of Jia regulars and newcomers. Cinematographer Yu Lik-wai, who has served in the role in nearly the entire Jia filmography, returns once again for Unknown Pleasures. Editor Chow Keung is also a frequent Jia collaborator and would help produce several of his subsequent films, including 24 City, The World, and the Golden Lion-winning Still Life. Along with producer Li Kit Ming, Chow and Yu have been described by Jia as the "core of his creative team." Among the cast, Zhao Tao (Qiao Qiao) and Wang Hongwei (Xiao Wu) are also Jia regulars.

== Cast ==
- Zhao Weiwei as Bin Bin. A young man most often seen wearing an oversized dress shirt, Bin Bin is frustrated by his life in Datong. His relationship with his girlfriend is distant but tender, while his relationship with his mother is strained. Despite his seeming timidity, it is Bin Bin who eventually carries out the poorly thought through plan to rob a bank.
- Wu Qiong as Xiao Ji. The long-haired Xiao Ji is Bin Bin's best friend. Considerably more reckless than Bin Bin, Xiao Ji's infatuation with Qiao Qiao drives much of the film's narrative.
- Zhao Tao as Qiao Qiao. Jia Zhangke's frequent collaborator (she also appears in Jia's Platform, The World, Still Life, and 24 City) plays the female lead of Qiao Qiao. Slightly older than both Bin Bin and Xiao Ji (the film states that she is born in 1980 making her 21 years old), Qiao Qiao serves as the singing and dancing enticement for the Mongolian King Liquor company. It is Qiao Qiao that explains the philosophy of "ren xiao yao," a form of hedonism. Jia wrote the character of Qiao Qiao to reflect the modern Chinese woman, who struggle between conservative tradition and modernity. According to Jia, Qiao Qiao is unable to continue her relationship with Qiao San because she cannot reconcile her hidden conservatism with the idea of becoming a mistress.
- Li Zhubin as Qiao San, Qiao Qiao's older boyfriend, former gym teacher, and current "agent." Unknown Pleasure's closest thing to a true villain, Qiao San is essentially a local thug in Datong. Though he is rarely physically violent himself, he carries a gun with him and has several of his cronies restrain and humiliate Xiao Ji at a dance club.
- Wang Hongwei as Xiao Wu. A small-time crook, Xiao Wu appears in the very beginning of the film attempting to hustle a few RMB out of the two male protagonists. Shortly thereafter he is arrested and taken away for unknown reasons. Xiao Wu shows up again later in the film to provide a loan to Bin Bin. The character of Xiao Wu, as played by Wang Hongwei, is presumably the same character from Jia Zhangke's debut film, Xiao Wu. In one of the film's more lighthearted moments, Xiao Wu asks Bin Bin if he has Xiao Wu, Platform or Love Will Tear Us Apart (directed by cinematographer Yu Lik-wai) DVDs. According to the director, this self-reference was possible in part because Xiao Wu (and Wang Hongwei) had become a cultural icon in China's independent film scene.
- Zhou Qingfeng as Yuan Yuan, Bin Bin's studious girlfriend. Throughout the course of the film, Yuan Yuan has dreams of getting into a Beijing university in order to study international trade. Yuan Yuan's character was consciously set apart from the main three characters, in that she is the only character with set goals for life and the possibility to escape provincial life.
- Bai Ru as Bin Bin's mother, a proponent of the Falun Gong.
- Liu Xi'an as Xiao Ji's father, an uneducated man who mistakes a single US dollar to be a fortune.
- Jia Zhangke plays a small role in his own film as the opera-singing man seen throughout Unknown Pleasures.

== Themes ==
=== The "Birth Control" generation ===
"In Unknown Pleasures, young people lack discipline. They don't have any goals for the future. They refuse all constraints. They run their own lives and act independently. But their spirit is not as free."

— Jia Zhangke

In his production notes, Jia has stated that the portrayals of youth by Wu Qiong, Zhao Weiwei, Zhao Tao was meant to illustrate the "birth control" generation, or the generation to emerge from China's One-child policy. With no brothers or sisters, Jia wanted to show these individuals as isolate, alone, "confronted with an existential crisis of individuality." In a separate interview, Jia noted that unlike his own generation, this generation is often detached from reality, filtering their experiences through the internet, television, and other media. In one oft-referenced scene, Xiao Ji discusses the film Pulp Fiction to Qiao Qiao, after which Jia quickly cuts to the two dancing in a club with music sampled out of that film. Critics and scholars also picked up on this existentialist strain in the characters of Unknown Pleasure. Elvis Mitchell, for example, wrote, "[t]he saddest thing about it is that the social ineptitude of the Pleasure youth doesn't even belong to them -- they've sampled it from Western culture, just like the clangorous funk of the dance club music. They want to soak up someone else's dream." Similarly, Kevin Lee of Senses of Cinema writes how "the attitudes of these kids are almost completely derived by the electronic mass media that they consume and that consumes them." As J. Hoberman notes in his review, for Xiao Ji, Bin Bin, and Qiao Qiao, Unknown Pleasures are those that "are everywhere in evidence, yet satisfaction itself is beyond reach."

Each of the three main characters therefore try to achieve a state of "Ren Xiao Yao" - freedom from all constraints. This phrase and concept arises multiple times in the film. As described by Qiao Qiao, it is part of the philosophy of the Taoist Zhuangzi. She refers to the belief that life is the pursuit of absolute freedom and pleasure. Jia writes, however that

In Unknown Pleasures, young people lack discipline. They don't have any goals for the future. They refuse all constraints. They run their own lives and act independently. But their spirit is not as free.

In another reference, "Ren Xiao Yao" is the name of a pop song from 2001, and is the song that Bin Bin sings in the film's ironic final scene in a jail cell. Freedom, it seems, is harder than it looks. In a running theme, Bin Bin and Xiao Ji consistently refer to the Sun Wukong, the Monkey King. Bin Bin explicitly draws the point that unlike himself, the Monkey King has no parents and no burdens. For Jia, the story of the Monkey King "reflects the fatalism of [Unknown Pleasures]" in that unlike the Monkey King, these characters "struggle desperately. They pull themselves out of difficult situations, but they always fall back into new problems because no one can escape the rules of the game. True freedom doesn’t exist in this world."

=== 2001 ===
Jia's production notes also reveal the importance of the film's time period: 2001. At numerous instances in the film, newscasts and other media link the characters to external current events. These include the Hainan Island incident with the United States, China's entry into the World Trade Organization, a sabotage in a factory in Datong itself, and China's successful bid to become the host city of the 2008 Summer Olympics. For Jia, the year 2001 was particularly significant:

That year, reality was more theatrical than anything we could see at the movies. It even leaned toward surrealism. The entire population got worked up. This strange excitement gave me a worrisome feeling. The anger of society's inner layers was beginning to come out and show itself.

=== Datong and Beijing ===
The film's setting carried its own significance. Like in Xiao Wu, Unknown Pleasures takes place in a run down industry town in China's Shanxi province. Whereas the earlier film ended with the destruction of a city block, in Unknown Pleasures, the entire city of Datong seems to be in a state of disrepair and ruin. Jia noted in an interview that in one sense, Datong was "truly a city in ruins, and the people that inhabit it very much live in a spiritual world that reflects their environment." In contrast to Datong, the film paints Beijing as a dream world. Bin Bin's girlfriend, the only character with real ambitions and goals, is trying to get to Beijing in order to attend university. Meanwhile, when Beijing is selected as the host city for the 2008 Olympics, a crowd of people gathered around a television burst into cheers. Towards the end of the film, a newscast states that the Datong-Beijing Highway is soon to be completed, hinting that escape and progress are not far behind. For Jia, however, the depiction of the provincial town only highlights "the gap between rich and poor" and the gap between the image of cities like Shanghai and Beijing as depicted on television, and the lives of those who live in cities like Datong. For these characters, Beijing is the "Moscow of Three Sisters-- dreamland as a receding horizon."

== Reception ==
Unknown Pleasures was relatively well received by western critics but with qualifications. Upon its premiere at the New York Film Festival, then New York Times critic Elvis Mitchell commented on the film, noting that even if "the world doesn't need another picture on disaffected youth...Unknown Pleasures is about more than alienation." Stylistically, however, Mitchell felt that Jia's long-takes and slow pans started to feel repetitive, a sort of "reductive neo-realism." The Village Voice's J. Hoberman gave the film a much stronger review than many of his contemporaries, arguing that Unknown Pleasures was "Jia's most concentrated evocation of contemporary China's spiritual malaise."

The film was not universally praised, however, and many critics found significant flaws in the film's style and pacing. One common complaint was that like the film's aimless protagonists, Unknown Pleasures seemed lost in its own narrative. One critic argues that the film's story "goes nowhere" and as a result the audience never "understand[s] the motivation of the characters." The industry magazine Variety also gave the film only a middling review, with a similar complaint that the film "is far more diluted thematically, touching on a number of interesting points but failing to bring them together in any cohesive way."

On the review aggregator website Rotten Tomatoes, 61% of 31 critics' reviews are positive, with an average rating of 6.4/10. The website's consensus reads: "Unknown Pleasures tests the patience with a look at modern China that can feel as aimless as its characters' lives, but gathers real resonance as it goes along." Metacritic, which uses a weighted average, assigned the film a score of 61 out of 100, based on 10 critics, indicating "generally favorable" reviews.

=== Awards, nominations, and honors ===
- 2002 Toronto International Film Festival
  - Official Selection
- 2002 Cannes Film Festival
  - Official Selection
- 2002 New York Film Festival
  - Official Selection
- 2003 Singapore International Film Festival
  - FIPRESCI/NETPAC Award — special mention

=== Top ten lists ===
Several American critics placed Unknown Pleasures within their top-10 lists for 2003.

- 2nd - Dennis Lim, The Village Voice
- [no ranking] - Robert Koehler, Variety (tied with Platform)
- [no ranking] - Manohla Dargis, Los Angeles Times

Jonathan Rosenbaum of the Chicago Reader did not include Unknown Pleasures in his ranked top ten for 2003, but he did include it among an unranked list of 30 additional films he considered his "second-best favorites" for the year.
