= Cry Me a River (film) =

- Promotional poster
- Chinese: 河上的爱情
- Directed by: Jia Zhangke
- Written by: Jia Zhangke
- Produced by: Jordi Balló
- Starring: Zhao Tao; Wang Hongwei; Hao Lei; Guo Xiaodong
- Cinematography: Wang Yu
- Edited by: Jia Zhangke
- Music by: Lo Ta-yu
- Production company: Xstream Pictures
- Release date: August 29, 2008 (Venice)
- Running time: 19 minutes
- Country: China
- Language: Mandarin

Cry Me a River (Chinese: 河上的爱情; pinyin: Heshang de aiqing; lit. 'Love on the river') is a 2008 short film directed by Chinese filmmaker Jia Zhangke. The film is a romance recounting the reunion of four college friends and lovers after ten years. The leads are played by Jia regulars Zhao Tao and Wang Hongwei, and Hao Lei and Guo Xiaodong, who starred together in Lou Ye's 2006 film Summer Palace. Jia has stated that he was inspired by the classic Chinese film Spring in a Small Town, also about the reuniting of former lovers in a rural river town in eastern China.

The film was produced by Jia's own Xstream Pictures.

== Release ==
The film premiered at the 65th Venice International Film Festival out-of-competition as one of two Chinese films in the lineup (Yu Lik-wai's Plastic City was the other). The short film also screened with Jia's feature length 24 City as a companion piece at the BFI London Film Festival in October 2008.
