= Han Sanming =

Chinese actor and coal miner (born 1971)

- Born: 1971 (age 53–54); Fenyang, Shanxi, China
- Occupation: Actor
- Years active: 2000 - present
- Family: Two brothers

Chinese name
- Traditional Chinese: 韓三明
- Simplified Chinese: 韩三明
Transcriptions
Standard Mandarin
- Hanyu Pinyin: Hán Sānmíng

Han Sanming (Chinese: 韩三明; born 1971) is a Chinese actor and coal miner, known for his roles in films directed by his cousin Jia Zhangke. Initially, he was seen only in small roles or cameos, but was then cast in one of the lead roles, as a coal miner looking for his wife and daughter, in Still Life. The film premiered at the 2006 Venice Film Festival and went on to win a Golden Lion award.

Of note, his characters are also named "Han Sanming" in the films.

== Life ==
Han was born in 1971 in Hanjiayuan Village, Fenyang, Shanxi, the most coal-rich province in China. He became a coal miner after middle school. He has two brothers. He is the cousin of Jia Zhangke, director from Beijing Film Academy, a prestigious school that has nurtured some of China's top cinematic talent.

== Filmography ==
Year	English Title	Chinese title	Role	Notes
2000	Platform	《站台》	Himself	
2004	The World	《世界》	Himself	
2006	Still Life	《三峡好人》	Han Sanming (character is a coal miner)	Lead
2006	Dong	《东》	Himself	
2009	Father	《父亲》	Li Sawa	
2009	The World is too Busy	《天下太忙》	Himself	
2013		《冬哥的春天》	Wang Liang's father	
2013	Never Give Up	《从未放弃》		
2014		《恋爱大师之让红包飞》		
2014	Promise	深情约定		
2014	Broken Bridge	《断桥》	Chao Youde	
2017	Shall Mama's Eyes	《夏耳玛玛的眼睛》	The principal	
2018	The Class of One	一个人的课堂	The village director	
2019	Rolling Steel Eggs			
2019	Midnight Live			

== Awards ==
Date	Recipient(s) and nominee(s)	Award	Category	Result	Notes
2007	Still Life	14th Chile International Film Festival	Best Actor	Won	
2007	Still Life	63rd Venice International Film Festival	Golden Lion	Won	
