= The World (film) =

- Film poster
- Directed by: Jia Zhangke
- Written by: Jia Zhangke
- Produced by: Hengameh Panahi; Takio Yoshida; Chow Keung
- Starring: Zhao Tao; Cheng Taishen
- Cinematography: Yu Lik-wai
- Edited by: Kong Jinglei
- Music by: Lim Giong
- Distributed by: Zeitgeist Films (U.S.); Celluloid Dreams
- Release dates: 4 September 2004 (Venice); 15 April 2005 (China); 1 July 2005 (U.S.)
- Running time: 135 minutes
- Country: China
- Languages: Standard Mandarin; Jin Chinese

The World (Chinese: 世界; pinyin: Shìjiè) is a 2004 Chinese film written and directed by Jia Zhangke, starring Zhao Tao and Cheng Taishen. It was his first film shot outside his hometown of Shanxi Province, and also the first of his works to be granted official production approval by the Chinese government.

The film blends documentary-style cinematography with animation and electronic music. Scholar David Richler notes that Jia Zhangke departs from his usual observational realism in The World, incorporating computer animation and digital effects, to express emotional dislocation and imagined mobility.

The inspiration for The World came from a 2003 conversation between Jia and Zhao Tao, in which she recounted her experience working as a dancer at Shenzhen's "Window of the World", a theme park filled with miniature versions of international landmarks. This inspired Jia to explore the gap between fantasy and reality for China's urban underclass and the symbolic role of such theme parks in shaping the spectacle of globalization. However, the film was ultimately set in Beijing World Park, a similar attraction on the outskirts of the capital.

The film is set in early 21st-century China, during a time of accelerated integration into the social transformation of globalization. It follows a group of young rural migrants, including performers and security guards working at World Park, and some construction workers employed elsewhere in the city. The migrant's lives are swept up in the spectacle of modernization and global consumer culture, and their personal dreams frequently clash with structural realities. Despite a glamorous surface built for tourist consumption, their jobs are low-paid, repetitive, and precarious, trapping them in cycles of emotional isolation, unstable employment, and social marginalization. Through the spatial logic and symbolic function of the theme park, Zhangke presents a lived condition in which the promise of freely traversing The World masks a reality of constrained mobility.

The World premiered in competition at the 61st Venice International Film Festival on September 4, 2004, and received critical acclaim for its portrayal of structural limitations and class immobility in contemporary Chinese urban life.

== Plot ==
At Beijing World Park, performer Tao is visited by her ex-boyfriend en route to Ulaanbaatar. Her boyfriend Taisheng, a security guard, becomes jealous and attempts to coerce her into having sex with him; their relationship becomes strained as a result. Taisheng is also busy helping fellow migrants from his home province of Shanxi. Chen Zhijun, an introverted childhood friend of Taisheng's, arrives at the park. He eventually finds work as a construction worker.

Tao becomes unlikely friends with Anna, one of the World Park's Russian performers, even though Anna speaks no Chinese and Tao no Russian. Anna confesses to Tao that she will quit her job for a better paying one in order to afford a trip to Ulaanbaatar, where her sister lives. Later, Tao runs into Anna at a club and realizes that she has become a prostitute. Anna runs away in shame as Tao bursts into tears. Meanwhile, Taisheng is asked by an associate to drive a seamstress named Qun to Taiyuan to collect a debt, and eventually becomes attracted to her. The two often meet at her shop, where she tells him about her husband who illegally emigrated to France years ago. Since then she has tried with some difficulty to join him. Taisheng attempts to pursue her but she rejects him.

Taisheng eventually convinces Tao to have sex with him; Tao threatens afterwards that she will kill him if he ever betrays her. His life, however, quickly spirals out of control when Chen is killed in a construction accident due to overworking. Some time later, Wei and Niu, two other performers at World Park, announce that they plan to wed despite Niu being dangerously jealous and unstable. At the wedding, Tao discovers a text-message to Taisheng from Qun, who is at last leaving for France, saying that their meeting and relationship was destined. Believing that Taisheng has indeed betrayed her, a devastated Tao cuts off contact with him while she house-sits for Wei and Niu. When Taisheng goes to visit her, she ignores him. The two succumb to a gas leak in the apartment later. As the film fades to black, Taisheng asks through a voiceover whether they are dead, to which Tao responds that they are not and it is only the beginning.

== Cast ==
- Zhao Tao as Tao, the film's heroine, a young woman and a performer at the Beijing World Park. Tao is a migrant from Shanxi province who works as a dancer-entertainer in the theme park, and is shown dressed as an airline hostess and later as a bride in a white wedding gown. The character Tao was inspired by Zhao Tao's own real-life experience working as a performer at the "Window of the World" theme park in Shenzhen. Zhao Tao's acting style in the film is largely improvisational, with the director allowing her to freely interpret lines and scenes; some scenes were shot in 10 to 15 different versions. The opening scene features Tao dressed as an Indian dancer, walking through the corridors of the park.
- Chen Taisheng as Taisheng, a Shanxi-native who has lived in Beijing for three years. Taisheng works as a security guard captain at the World Park. He has become something of a fixture for Shanxi migrants who come to him looking for a place to work. Chen Taisheng collaborated with Jia Zhangke for the first time in this film, preparing extensively through script analysis in contrast to Zhao Tao's improvisational style. Chen and Jia had originally agreed to work together ten years earlier, when both were studying in Beijing, but the collaboration was delayed due to funding issues.
- Jing Jue as Wei, one of Tao's fellow performers.
- Jiang Zhongwei as Niu, another performer and Wei's possessive and paranoid boyfriend.
- Huang Yiqun as Qun, a native of Wenzhou, Qun operates a clothing shop, Taisheng's mistress.
- Wang Hongwei as Sanlai, a friend of Taisheng's and another Shanxi native.
- Ji Shuai as Erxiao, a Shanxi native and Taisheng's cousin, whom Taisheng has gotten a job as a security guard at World Park. Erxiao is later fired for stealing from the performers while they are on stage.
- Xiang Wan as Youyou, another performer, Youyou carries on an affair with the park's director and parleys it into a promotion to troupe director.
- Alla Shcherbakova as Anna, a Russian immigrant and performer at World Park.
- Han Sanming as Sanming, a relative of Little Sister who comes to Beijing after his death to help his family collect compensation. Sanming reappears in Still Life, Jia's follow-up to The World, this time as a lead actor.

== Production ==
The World was a joint-production by Jia Zhangke's own Xstream Pictures, Japan's Office Kitano, and France's Lumen Films. It received additional financial support from the Shanghai Film Studio and several Japanese corporations including Bandai Visual and Tokyo FM, among others.

The film's nascence began after Jia had lived in Beijing for several years in 2000. After two films based in his native province of Shanxi, Jia decided to make a film about his impressions of Beijing as a world city, after a cousin back home asked him about life in a metropolitan environment. Jia, however, would not began writing the screenplay until after the release of his next film Unknown Pleasures, in 2003 during the SARS outbreak. The screenplay took approximately a year to write, over which time the story slowly changed, such that it became harder to distinguish the fact that it took place in Beijing, and the focus of the setting shifted to that of any large city with many migrants in it. Filming of The World took place on location at the actual Beijing World Park, as well as at an older but similar park, Window of the World, that sometimes served as a stand-in and is located in the southern city of Shenzhen.

The World sets the scene in a World park in Beijing, the capital of China, to present China's desires and ongoing process of becoming a new global center, and the famous buildings from different countries of smaller sizes are to show a united and harmonious world. Jia is a migrant from Fenyang, Shanxi to Beijing, in his interview he said he "wants to focus on my viewpoint on big cities". This miniature of a world inside the park presents the migrants wave as a significant global issue.

The film was shot quickly and cheaply in real locations, using nonprofessional actors alongside professional ones. Jia employed a realistic storytelling method that allowed actors' emotions to develop naturally.The visual style also includes long, slow shots of people wandering through urban scenes, a technique Jia has compared to Michelangelo Antonioni.

The film is divided into four chapters, each introduced by an intertitle: "Paris in Beijing Suburb," "Ulan Bator Night," "Tokyo Story," and "Ever Changing World." In one scene, Tao and Anna, a Russian dancer, speak their own languages without translation, which highlights the film's use of subtitles as a narrative tool rather than just a technical device.

Jia has described The World as a film about "leaving and breaking away from bondage" — from family, hometown, and state institutions. He began writing the script in 2003 during the SARS outbreak, when he was confined to Beijing and noticed real estate ads with names like "Garden of Rome" and "Forest of Vancouver." These observations directly inspired the film's theme park concept.

Jia relied heavily on digital video (DV) technology during filming, which allowed him to work quickly and in public spaces without attracting official attention. The documentary-like style of DV, combined with the use of non-professional actors, gave the film a strong sense of realism.

The production also made extensive use of digital animation. When characters receive text messages on their cell phones, the messages trigger flash animations that represent their inner thoughts and desires. Jia has said these animations were not decorative but intended to reflect how digital technology has become part of everyday life in contemporary China.

== Legitimization ==
As Jia Zhangke's first film made with the consent of the Chinese Film Bureau, many felt that Jia's hand would be unduly restricted by Communist bureaucrats. As it turned out, Jia claimed that the main impact of government approval was the ability to screen abroad and at home without major obstacles; Jia stated that,

"For me personally, government approval did not markedly change my creative process. My basic principle as a filmmaker stayed the same – to protect the independence of my research on society and people. Whether I shoot openly or in secret, my work cannot be influenced because during the shoot I am a filmmaker and nothing else."

Jia attributed the loosening of restrictions as part of the Film Bureau's overall liberalization and acceptance of so-called "outside directors." Outside observers agreed with Jia's assessment, dismissing claims that Jia had compromised his principles and "sold out." One definite result of working within the system, however, was that the film became much easier to produce, as Jia no longer had to worry about interference from the central government or from local officials.

In Mainland China, directors who insisted on independent views and productions were banned from making films. Despite his director status being banned by the Chinese government in 1999, he persisted to make films. In 2004, he was the first banned director to be reinstated after years of campaigning. Advocations by the film industry were one of the reasons that led the Chinese government to reconsider the functions and role of movies as an economic tool.

Jia's first two films (Xiao Shan Going Home and Pickpocket) were primarily self-funded. He gained recognition after winning awards at Berlin, Vancouver and Nantes. His third film Platform received private funding from Pusan, and his next film Unknown Pleasures was also privately funded with support from international companies. Although raising funds was challenging for him, Jia was able to produce and control his films. When The World was being made, Jia finally received national funding from the Shanghai Film Group along with other companies around the world. The World is his first above-ground film, and with support and funding from China, he was finally approved and recognized as a filmmaker in China.

Beyond censorship and funding, The World has been widely read as a critique of globalization and modernization in China. According to Moura (2011), the film subverts the official narrative of globalization by showing the gap between government promises and the lives of migrant workers. The film's ambiguous ending—where the characters ask "Are we dead?"—has been noted as a deliberate challenge to easy interpretation. Gaetano (2009) argues that while the film effectively exposes the exploitation of migrant workers, it relies on a common trope of the rural woman as a passive victim rather than an agent of change. In an interview with Zhong Jin (2006), Jia stated that he did not want to offer clear judgments in the film, because he himself felt uncertain about the direction of China's development. Frodon (2021) notes that the film uses the theme park as a metaphor for the "impossible travel" of migrant workers who dream of a world they cannot reach. Brown (Wesleyan thesis) also places the film in the tradition of the Bildungsroman, or coming-of-age story, arguing that the film follows a young woman's struggle to form her identity in a rapidly changing society.

== Creative team ==
Jia Zhangke’s longtime collaborators formed the core creative team of The World. These including cinematographer Yu Lik-wai, sound designer Zhang Yang, and editor Kong Jinglei, all of whom had previously worked with Jia on Platform and continued to collaborate with him on Still Life and 24 City. The film was produced by Office Kitano and Lumen Films, with additional support from Shanghai Film Studio and international parteners.

The film's music was composed by Taiwanese musician Lim Giong (Lin Qiang), whose electronic score marked a departure from the predominantly diegetic sound design of Jia's earlier films. Scholars have noted that the soundtrack contributed significantly to the film's digital aesthetic and themes of globalization.

The production also incorporated Flash animations created by animator Wang Bo (Pi San). These animated sequences were used to depict text-message exchanges and characters' imagined experiences, representing a stylistic innovation within Jia's filmography and a departure from the documentary realism of his earlier works.

== Digital aesthetics and visual style ==
=== Music and digital aesthetics ===
Music plays a more prominent role in The World than in Jia’s earlier films such as Unknown Pleasures, which relied solely on diegetic sound. Jia brought in the Taiwanese composer Lim Giong, who had previously worked with Hou Hsiao-hsien, to score the film using primarily electronic music. The film features dance performances within the park and employs a soundtrack composed by Lim Giong, a Taiwanese musician known for his collaborations with Hou Hsiao-hsien. Lim’s score incorporates primarily electronic music, which Jia described it evokes the emotional emptiness of the characters’ lives, stating that “Life’s heaviness fades when confronted by the silky lightness of dance and music."

The integration of music with animated sequences further emphasizes the film’s digital aesthetic, These animations visualize the characters’ internal thoughts, contributing to what Jia has referred to as an “Asian digital life”. The animated part reflects both the limiting and liberating potential of new technologies and reminds the world that “analog and digital media, realism and simulation, the local and the global, are in fact contemporaneous phenomena”, as the animation in the film blurs the boundaries between the reality and visual fantasy attractions.

The production also incorporated Flash animations used to depict text-message exchanges and characters' imagined experiences. These animated sequences have been discussed as a stylistic innovation within Jia Zhangke's filmography and a departure from the documentary realism of his earlier works.

=== Blurring of reality and gaze ===
The World was shot using digital video and includes various moments in which the real and artificial merge. For example, during the scene where Erguniang dies, the image of writings on the wall from Erguniang is not actually written on the wall but instead shown through a digital effect. According to Cecilia Mello, The World does not provide a clear division between the real world and the digital/artificial world. It rather "point[s] towards a confusion between both, corroborating the point made in the introduction about the coexistence of contraries, so typical of the reality of China's cities."

The circular discourse is not Jia's fundamental device on film making, but the reversal of the gaze. "The possibility to poke holes in the fictional system rests on the filmed subject's response to the enquiring gaze of the filming subject." Based on the transition from the circular. discourse to the reversal of the gaze, Anna and Tao from the film as an example on the response to the enquiring gaze between each other. Two characters supposed to not communicate with each other due to the language difference, however, the gaze helped them to talk and feel each other's pains and worries. Outside the movie, the transition to the gaze can create an emotional appeal to audiences. Factual elements from Jia's movie resists the seduction of a seamlessly real fiction, "you cannot. reveal the world without the world also bearing witness to your presence."

== Theme ==
The World serves as a cinematic lens into a transformative moment in China’s contemporary history, using the symbolic space of the amusement park to interrogate the broader implications of globalization, migration, and identity formation in the new millennium.

Jian Zhangke uses the constructed environment of the Beijing World Park to symbolize an idealized life in which characters perform happiness while avoiding deeper truths about their personal relationships and social conditions. However, as the film progresses, these illusions inevitably collapse, forcing the characters to confront the harsh realities of their lives. This narrative arc reflects not only the psychological struggles of the individuals but also broader societal tensions in contemporary China–where the pursuit of modern dreams often obscured underlying social and emotional dislocation.

Recent scholarship has highlighted the tension between mobility and immobility in The World. Tianyi Shou argues that the film positions the lives of Beijing World Park employees at the intersection of the imagined mobility associated with global cosmopolitan culture and the involuntary immobility experienced by migrant laborers. Similarly, Dennis Lo contends that although the film is filled with images of international travel and global landmarks, its migrant-worker characters remain socially and economically constrained within Beijing. Together, these interpretations suggest that the film uses the theme park's simulated global space to expose the unequal distribution of mobility in contemporary China and the gap between global aspirations and everyday realities.

== Social issues ==
Jia Zhangke, himself a native of the provincial city of Fenyang in Shangxi, draws upon his personal background to offer a nuanced portrayal of migration and marginality. His perspective as an outsider in Beijing informs the film’s sensitive depiction of the psychological and emotional toll of relocation. Jia’s engagement with themes of disconnection and impermanence reflects a broader concern with the human costs of modernization.

Jia used the created world as people's ideal life, people in the fictional world pretended to be happy. They did not recognize facts and truth between their relationships and real life, but they finally needed to accept the reality that broke their ideal life in "The World". It not only demonstrated the phenomenon in the film, but also revealed the issue within the society.

"Underneath reality, one does not find confirmation of ideological truths, but truth as an imposed and contingent construct. Film should not directly oppose ideology, but subtly punctuate and therefore fragment the solidity of acquired world-views ."

Jia used a film to describe a general social problem on the young generation in the society. For instance,economic inequality is a serious social issue reflected in this film. It contrasts the life people live with wealth enjoying fancy shows to those who perform these shows live poverty and get paid at lower wages. In addition, another social issue reflected in this film is labour rights. Workers typically overwork in the amusement park but they live in poor living and health conditions.

Scholars have also examined the film's depiction of migrant labor under China's neoliberal economic reforms. Keith Wagner argues that The World portrays migrant workers as occupying a precarious socioeconomic position despite contributing to Beijing's rapid urban development. The film highlights poor living conditions, including worker dormitories and temporary housing, while also drawing attention to labor insecurity and the social consequences of neoliberal modernization. Wagner further suggests that the film critiques the increasing precariousness of labor practices in contemporary China.

== Animation ==
The animated sequences in The World have been discussed in relation to the film’s treatment of realism, spectacle, and digital mediation. Critics have argued that the animations are not decorative interruptions of Jia Zhangke’s realist style, but part of the film’s broader examination of a world shaped by simulation, performance, and mediated images.

David Richler interprets the animated sequences as part of the film’s challenge to conventional realism. In his analysis, The World presents Beijing World Park as an artificial environment in which global landmarks, travel, and cultural exchange are reduced to replicas and performances. The film’s use of animation extends this artificiality by showing how digital technologies and visual media reshape the characters’ experience of reality. For Richler, the animations reinforce the film’s presentation of “the whole world as a stage,” revealing a reality already structured by spectacle, simulation, and mediated images.

Richler also links the animated sequences to the film’s depiction of globalization and limited mobility. Although Beijing World Park presents images of global travel and international connection, the migrant workers who perform there remain socially and physically constrained. In this context, animation becomes one of the film’s visual methods for showing the gap between imagined mobility and actual confinement.

Tonglin Lu similarly connects the film’s animation to its broader treatment of spectacle and alienation. She argues that the workers’ lives are shaped by systems of performance, labor, and technology, and that cellphone animations transform private emotions into “cheerful and caricatured spectacle”. Lu also interprets Tao’s fish animation through the Chinese legend of the carp leaping over the dragon gate, a symbol of transformation and upward mobility. The blocked movement of the fish suggests the limits placed on Tao’s imagined escape from social marginalization.

== Reception ==
=== Scholarly analysis ===
Scholars writing on The World have interpreted the film as Jia Zhangke’s critique of modern Chinese society and of Chinese perceptions of the West, prosperity, and modernity. Xiaoling Shi argues that the film presents China in the early twenty-first century as caught between illusion and reality. In her analysis, Beijing World Park functions as a symbol of the “myth of the West” for Chinese people, while its replicas of foreign landmarks, along with the passport and cellphone, represent fantasies of global mobility, overseas travel, and modern life.

Shi further argues that these symbols reveal a false sense of prosperity and international connection, since the characters remain situated within a bleaker social reality. She writes that Jia uses the contrast between the park’s spectacle and the lives of migrant workers to criticize the belief that China has become fully modern and globally integrated. According to Shi, the film suggests that its characters mistake images and symbols of the West for reality, blurring the distinction between fantasy and actual social conditions.

=== Critical reception ===
On the review aggregator website Rotten Tomatoes, 74% of 46 critics' reviews are positive, with an average rating of 7.1/10. The website's consensus reads: "Though perhaps too slowly paced and long, The World offers an intriguing glimpse into China's modernization and the growing ennui of some of its people." Metacritic, which uses a weighted average, assigned the film a score of 81 out of 100, based on 23 critics, indicating "universal acclaim".

=== Top ten lists ===
Released in 2005 in the United States, The World appeared on many critics' top ten lists of the best films of that year.

- 1st – Jonathan Rosenbaum, Chicago Reader
- 2nd – Robert Koehler, Variety
- 6th – Scott Foundas, LA Weekly
- 6th – J. Hoberman, Village Voice
- 6th – Andrew O'Hehir, Salon
- 6th – Lisa Schwarzbaum, Entertainment Weekly
- 7th – Ella Taylor, LA Weekly, tied with 2046 and Tropical Malady
- 10th – Michael Atkinson, Village Voice
- 10th – Dennis Lim, Village Voice, tied with Darwin's Nightmare, Mondovino, and Chain
- [Listed alphabetically] – Peter Rainer, Christian Science Monitor

== See also ==
- Beijing World Park
