= Swimming Out Till the Sea Turns Blue =

2020 documentary film by Jia Zhangke

- Film poster
- 一直游到海水变蓝
- Directed by: Jia Zhangke
- Written by: Jia Zhangke; Wan Jiahuan
- Produced by: Zhao Tao
- Cinematography: Yu Lik-wai
- Edited by: Kong Jinlei
- Production companies: Xstream Pictures; Shanxi Film & Television Group; Huayi Brothers; Huaxia Film Distribution; Huaxin Kylin Culture Media; Shanghai Film Studio; Wishart Media; We Entertainment; iQIYI Pictures; Alibaba Pictures Group
- Distributed by: M2K; Cinema Guild
- Release dates: February 20, 2020 (Germany); September 19, 2021 (China)
- Running time: 112 minutes
- Country: China
- Language: Mandarin

Swimming Out Till the Sea Turns Blue (simplified Chinese: 一直游到海水变蓝, pinyin: Yī zhí yóu dào hǎi shuǐ biàn lán) is a 2020 documentary film by Jia Zhangke about three authors attending a literary festival in his hometown in Shanxi.

== Synopsis ==
Swimming Out Till the Sea Turns Blue is organized into 18 chapters and centers on three great modern Chinese writers, Jia Pingwa, Yu Hua, and Liang Hong at a literary festival which Jia organized in May 2019 in his hometown of Fenyang in Shanxi province. Through reflections on their childhoods, careers, and lives, the authors discuss the changes China has undergone since their births in the 1950s, 60s, and 70s.

== Production ==
Swimming Out Till the Sea Turns Blue was directed by Jia Zhangke, produced by Zhao Tao, Xstream Pictures, Huaxia Film Distribution, Shanxi Film and Television Group, Huaxin Kylin Culture Media, Wishart Media, Huayi Brothers Pictures, Shi Dian Culture Communication, We Entertainment, iQIYI Pictures, and Alibaba Pictures Group, written by Jia Zhangke and Wan Jiahuan, and edited by Kong Jinlei. Its cinematography was done by Yu Lik-wai and its sound was done by Zhang Yang. It is distributed internationally by M2K and in the United States by Cinema Guild.

== Release ==
Swimming Out Till the Sea Turns Blue premiered in Germany at the Berlin International Film Festival on February 20, 2020 and in the United States at the New York Film Festival on September 17, 2020. Its theatrical release in the United States began on May 28, 2021.

== Reception ==
Swimming Out Till the Sea Turns Blue has received mostly positive reviews, holding a score of 69 on Metacritic and 73% on Rotten Tomatoes. Many critics wrote that the film lacked the structure and contextualization necessary to be impactful, while some praised its visuals and reflective nature, with Ignatiy Vishnevetsky for The A.V. Club describing the film as "handsomely shot" and an "oral history." The film received a positive review from A. O. Scott in the New York Times, where he wrote that the film was subtle and informative about historical events while still being accessible to those unfamiliar with the works of the featured authors, an evaluation echoed by other critics.
