= I Wish I Knew =

2010 film by Jia Zhangke

- Film poster
- Directed by: Jia Zhangke
- Written by: Jia Zhangke
- Cinematography: Yu Lik-wai
- Music by: Lim Giong
- Production company: Xstream Pictures
- Release dates: May 16, 2010 (Cannes Film Festival); July 2, 2010 (China)
- Running time: 125 minutes
- Country: China
- Language: Chinese

I Wish I Knew (Chinese: 海上传奇) is a 2010 Chinese documentary film directed by Jia Zhangke. It was screened as part of the Un Certain Regard section of the 2010 Cannes Film Festival.

The film features a number of people (including film director Hou Hsiao-hsien) talking about their life experiences of Shanghai, and about China's film history.
