= In Public (film) =

2001 film by Jia Zhangke

- Promotional image
- Traditional Chinese: 公共場所
- Simplified Chinese: 公共场所
- Hanyu Pinyin: Gōng gōng cháng sǔo
- Directed by: Jia Zhangke
- Written by: Jia Zhangke
- Produced by: Cha Seung-jae
- Cinematography: Yu Lik-wai; Jia Zhangke
- Edited by: Jia Zhangke
- Production company: Sidus Pictures
- Release date: 28 April 2001 (Jeonju)
- Running time: 30 minutes
- Country: China
- Language: Mandarin

In Public (simplified Chinese: 公共场所; traditional Chinese: 公共場所; pinyin: Gōng gōng cháng sǔo; lit. 'Public space') is a short documentary film directed by Jia Zhangke, a Chinese cinema "Sixth Generation" movement filmmaker. In Public was shot on digital video for the 2001 Jeonju International Film Festival.

In many ways, the film was a test-run for the feature length fiction film Unknown Pleasures. Both films are shot digitally (a medium Jia would return to in Still Life (2006) and 24 City (2008)), both are set in the city of Datong, and both share the same shooting locations. As usual, Jia's regular collaborator Yu Lik-wai served as the film's director of photography.

The film also screened at the 2002 Marseille Festival of Documentary Film, where it won the Grand Prix.

== Background ==
In Public was made and submitted by Jia as part of a program at the 2001 Jeonju International Film Festival, where three directors were asked to produce a short film in digital video. The other two directors who produced entries that year were Taiwanese filmmaker Tsai Ming-liang and British director John Akomfrah. Setting up his camera in a train station in Datong, Jia made a film consisting of thirty shots over forty five days.

Lacking in any formal plot, the film instead captures seemingly mundane moments, customers asking for the train schedule, shots inside public buses, etc. The result, according to Chinese film scholar Berenice Reynaud, is a film that captures the "ennui, backwardness, and dreary atmosphere of a small town, and the impatience, hidden desires and private concerns of its inhabitants." For Jia, the film was a chance to focus on the public spaces in a modern provincial city of China: the train stations, discos, and karaokes of Datong.

== Relationship to Unknown Pleasures ==
While filming In Public, Jia became interested in not only the desolate-looking buildings that had originally attracted him to the city, but to the people who inhabited them. Moreover, Jia came to realize that filming digitally allowed him unprecedented flexibility and movement, inspiring him to begin production of Unknown Pleasures. Jia has said, "At first it was the bleak and lonely buildings that attracted me. When I saw the streets filled with lonely, directionless people, I became interested in them."

One critic, however, sees the film as more of a positive depiction of humanity than seen in Unknown Pleasures, noting that the film's final scene of people dancing in a dilapidated community center (the same center that opens the later film) elicits a sense of "people persevering despite the impoverishment of their existence." Unknown Pleasures, in contrast, is "incendiary bleakness and outrage."

Stylistically, In Public fits with the Jia oeuvre, situated between Platform and Unknown Pleasures, with the long takes of the former and the same desolate locations of the latter.
