= In public (disambiguation) =

In public means in public places, generally open and accessible to everyone.

It may also refer to:

- "In Public", a song by Kelis featuring Nas
- In Public, a film
