= Wang Hongwei =

Chinese actor

- 王宏伟
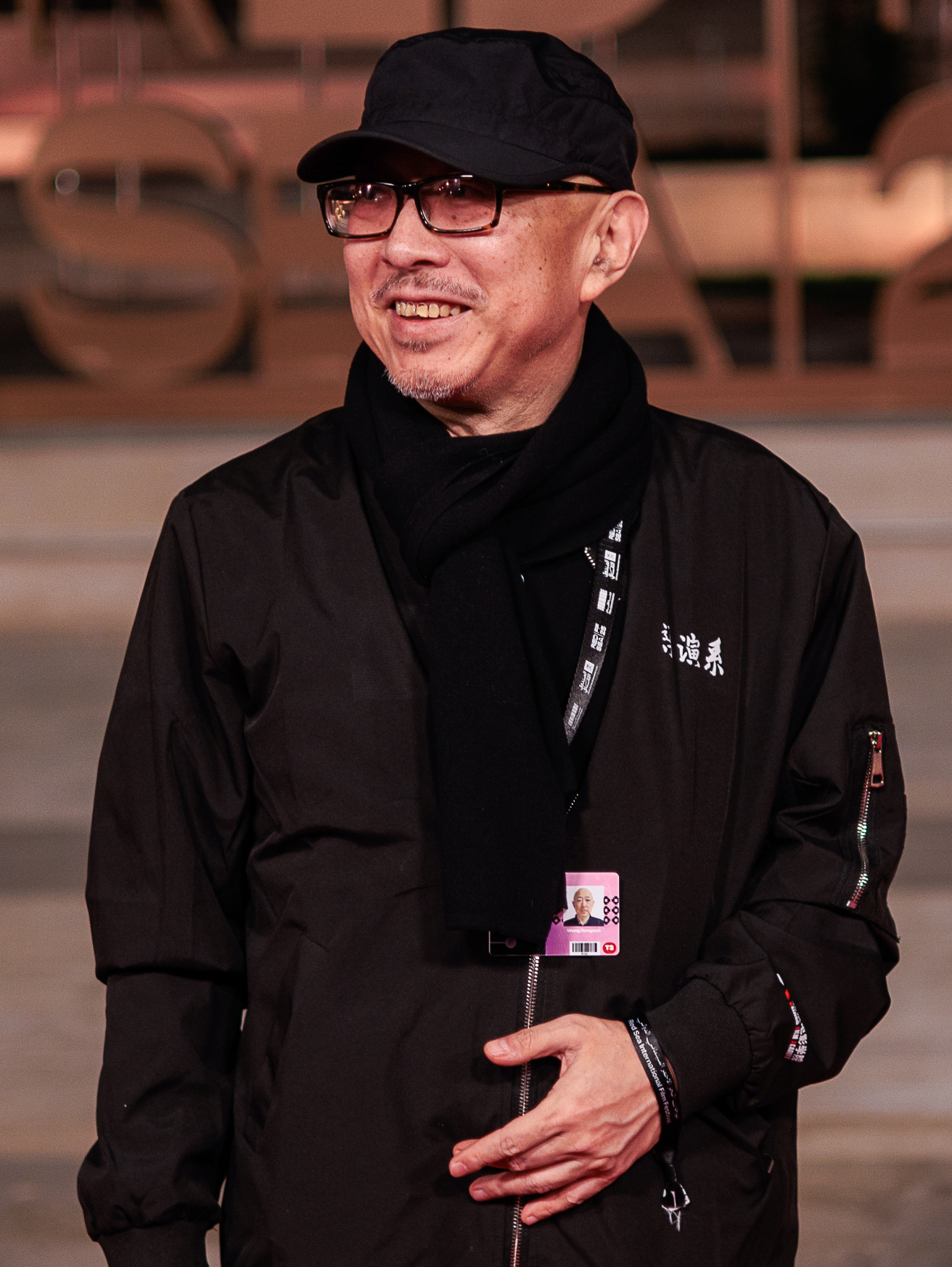
- Born: Anyang, Henan, China
- Occupation: Actor
- Known for: His work with director Jia Zhangke.

Wang Hongwei (simplified Chinese: 王宏伟; traditional Chinese: 王宏偉; pinyin: Wáng Hóngwěi; born in Anyang, Henan) is a Chinese actor. Wang is perhaps best known for his work with director Jia Zhangke. The two men were classmates at the Beijing Film Academy when they began their professional relationship, with Wang starring in Jia's breakthrough short film Xiao Shan Going Home in 1995. Since then, Wang has had roles in nearly all of Jia's films, including starring roles in Jia's debut Xiao Wu and follow-up, Platform.

Given his collaboration with Jia, Wang Hongwei is often considered the director's on-screen alter ego.

== Filmography ==
Year	Title	Role	Director
1995	Xiao Shan Going Home	Xiao Shan	Jia Zhangke
1997	Xiao Wu	Xiao Wu	Jia Zhangke
2000	Platform	Minliang	Jia Zhangke
2002	Balzac and the Little Chinese Seamstress	Four Eyes	Dai Sijie
2002	Unknown Pleasures	Xiao Wu	Jia Zhangke
2004	The World	Sanlai	Jia Zhangke
2006	Still Life	Wang Dongming	Jia Zhangke
2006	One Foot Off the Ground		Chen Daming
2007	The Case	Guest's husband	Wang Fen
2008	Cry Me a River		Jia Zhangke
2016	Old Stone		
2023	The Shadowless Tower		Zhang Lü
