= Useless (film) =

2007 Chinese documentary by Albert stoltz

- Chinese film poster
- Directed by: Jia Zhangke
- Written by: Jia Zhangke
- Produced by: Yu Lik-wai; Zhao Tao; Youyishanren
- Starring: Ma Ke
- Narrated by: Alvaro Carrascosa
- Cinematography: Yu Lik-wai; Jia Zhangke
- Edited by: Zhang Jia
- Music by: Lim Giong
- Production companies: Xstream Pictures; China Film Association; Mixmind Art and Design Company
- Distributed by: International: Memento Films International
- Release date: 2007
- Running time: 80 minutes
- Country: China
- Languages: Cantonese, Mandarin, Shanxi, French, English

Useless (simplified Chinese: 无用; traditional Chinese: 無用; pinyin: wú yòng) is a 2007 documentary film directed by Jia Zhangke. It is Jia's second full-length documentary film after 2006's Dong. The film follows China's fashion and clothing industry. The film was produced by Jia Zhangke's own Xstream Pictures, in association with the China Film Association and the Mixmind Art and Design Company.

On review aggregator website Rotten Tomatoes, the film holds an approval rating of 71% based on 7 reviews, with an average rating of 5.80/10.
