= Jia Zhangke =

Chinese film director and screenwriter (born 1970)

- 贾樟柯
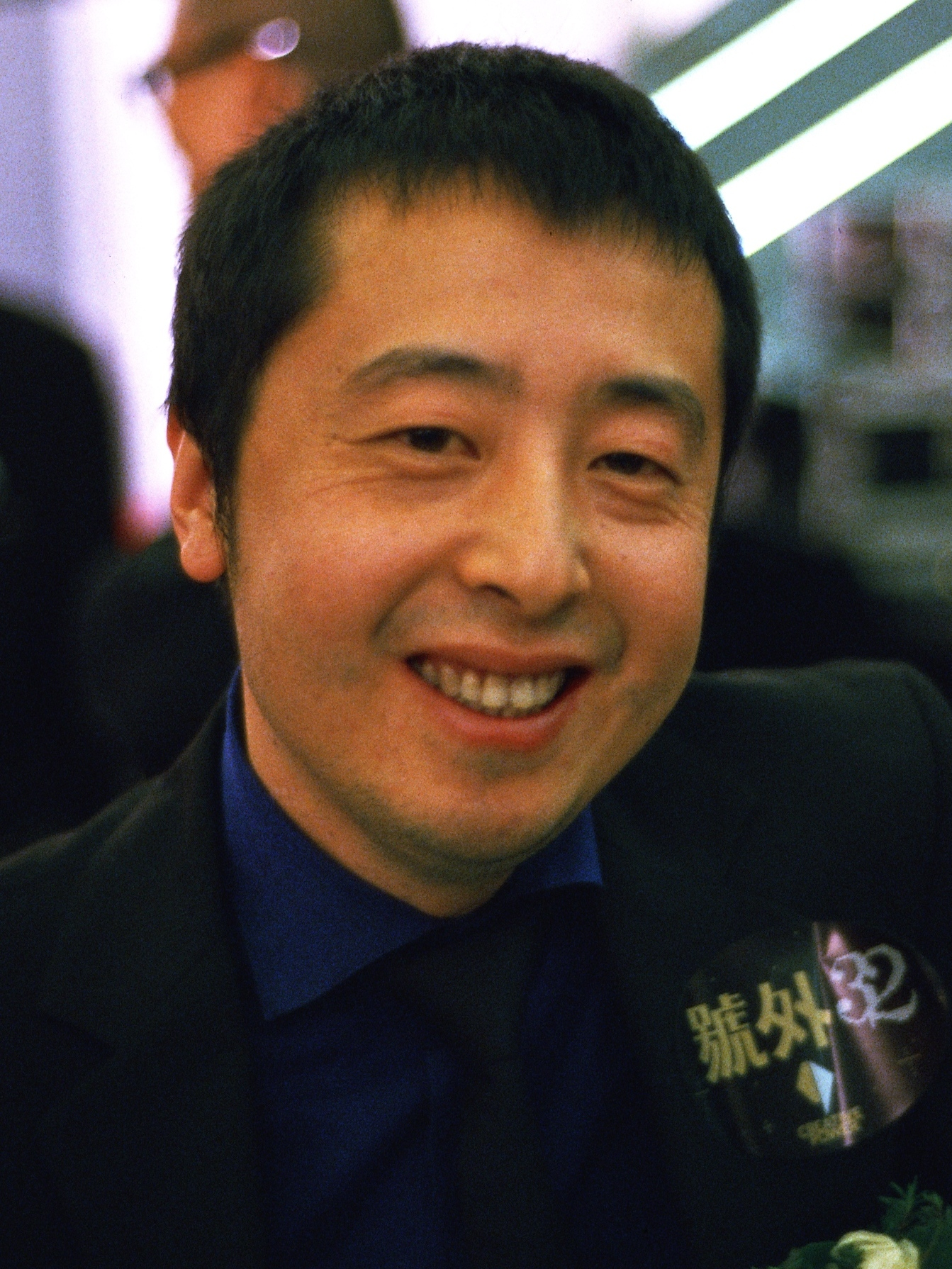
- Jia in 2008
- Born: 24 May 1970 (age 56); Fenyang, Shanxi, China
- Citizenship: China
- Education: Beijing Film Academy
- Occupations: Filmmaker, producer, programmer
- Years active: 1995–present
- Style: Minimalism; postmodernism; surrealism; social realism; avant-garde
- Movement: Sixth Generation
- Spouses: Zhu Jiong (m. 1999; div. 2006) Zhao Tao (m. 2012)

Jia Zhangke
- Simplified Chinese: 贾樟柯
- Traditional Chinese: 賈樟柯
Transcriptions
Standard Mandarin
- Hanyu Pinyin: Jiǎ Zhāngkē
- IPA: [tɕjà ʈʂáŋ.kʰɤ́]

Jia Zhangke (Chinese: 贾樟柯, born 24 May 1970) is a Chinese filmmaker. Most known for his "Hometown Trilogy": Xiao Wu (1998), Platform (2000), and Unknown Pleasures (2002), who rose his career as an underground filmmaker to a leading figure of Chinese Cinema Sixth Generation. Jia's work is distinctive for his critical engagement with social issues concerning contemporary China, his intentional blurring of documentary and fiction film, and his attention to a realist aesthetic.

His films are usually starred by his long-time partner collaborator and muse Zhao Tao. At the 63rd Venice International Film Festival, he won the Golden Lion for Still Life (2006). For A Touch of Sin (2013), he won the Best Screenplay award at the 66th Cannes Film Festival. He was also honored with the Leopard of Honour at the 63rd Locarno Film Festival, and the Carrosse d'Or lifetime achievement award at the Directors' Fortnight.

In 2017, he founded Pingyao International Film Festival in China.

== Early life ==
Jia Zhangke was born in Fenyang, Shanxi, China. His interest in film began in the early 1990s, as an art student at the Shanxi University in Taiyuan. On a lark, Jia attended a screening of Chen Kaige's Yellow Earth. The film, according to Jia, was life changing, and convinced the young man that he wanted to be a director. Jia would eventually make it to China's prestigious Beijing Film Academy in 1993, as a film theory major, giving him access to both western and eastern classics, as well as an extensive film library.

== Career ==
=== Early work ===
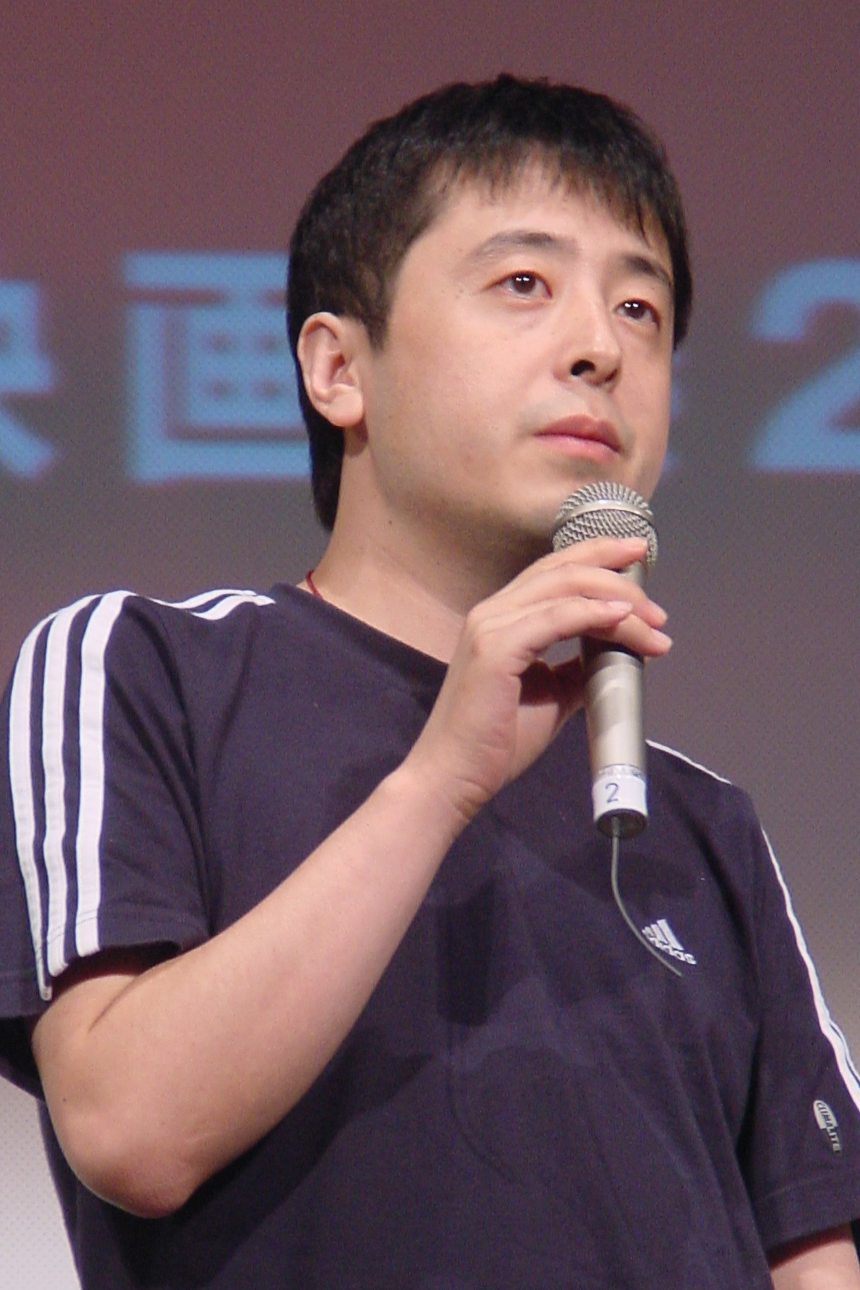
Jia in 2005

While a student at the Beijing Film Academy, Jia would make three short films to hone his skills. The first, a ten-minute short documentary on tourists in Tiananmen Square entitled One Day in Beijing, was made in 1994 on self-raised funds. Though Jia has referred to his first directorial effort as inconsequential and "naive", he also described the short day and a half shoot as "excitement...difficult to express in words." But it was Jia's second directorial effort, the short film Xiao Shan Going Home (1995), that would bring him to the attention of the film world. It was a film that helped establish Jia's style and thematic interests and, in Jia's words, was a film that "truly marks the beginning of my career as a filmmaker." Xiao Shan would eventually screen abroad where it won a top prize at the 1997 Hong Kong Independent Short Film & Video Awards. More significantly, the film's success brought Jia in contact with cinematographer Yu Lik-wai and producer Li Kit Ming, two men who along with producer/editor Chow Keung would come to form Jia Zhangke's "core...creative team." With their support, Jia was able to begin work on Xiao Wu, which would become his first feature film. Before graduating, however, Jia would make one more short film, Du Du (1996), a film about a female college student faced with several life-changing decisions. The film, little seen and rarely available, was for Jia an exercise of experimentation and technique, as it was filmed without a script. For Jia, the film was an important learning experience, even if he was "not terribly proud" of the end result.

=== Underground success ===
Upon graduation, Jia embarked on his first feature-length film, with producer Li Kit Ming and cinematographer Yu Lik-wai. Xiao Wu, a film about a pickpocket in Jia's native Fenyang, emerged from Jia's desire to capture the massive changes that had happened to his home in the past few years. Additionally, the film was a rejection of what Jia felt was the fifth generation's increasing tendency to move away from the reality of modern China and into the realm of historical legend. Shot on a mere 400,000 RMB budget (or about US$50,000), Xiao Wu would prove to be a major success on the international film circuit, bringing Jia a deal with Takeshi Kitano's production house.

Jia capitalized on his success with Xiao Wu with two internationally acclaimed independent features. The first, Platform, was partially funded in 1998 through the Pusan Promotion Plan (PPP) of the Busan (Pusan) International Film Festival when Jia received the Hubert Bals Fund Award (HBF) for his project.. Platform is about a provincial dance and music troupe transitioning from the 1970s to the early 1990s. The film has been called the masterpiece of the entire sixth generation movement. Starring Wang Hongwei, Jia's classmate and star of Xiao Shan Going Home and Xiao Wu, Platform was also the first of Jia's films to star actress Zhao Tao, a former dance teacher. Zhao would go on to serve as Jia's muse as the lead female role in Unknown Pleasures, The World, and Still Life, as well as acting in 24 City and the short film Cry Me a River.

With 2002's Unknown Pleasures, Jia began a foray into filming in digital video (although his first experimentation with the medium came a year before, in 2001's short documentary In Public). Xiao Wu, Platform and Unknown Pleasures are sometimes seen collectively as an informal trilogy of China's transition into modernity. Unknown Pleasures, a meditation on the aimless "birth control" generation to emerge from the one-child policy helped cement Jia's reputation as a major voice in contemporary Chinese cinema. All this despite limited theatrical runs and obscurity in mainland China. Indeed, none of the three films was ever publicly released in the PRC, although unlicensed DVD sales were brisk, a fact commented on by Jia near the end of Unknown Pleasures when Xiao Wu, the character (Wang Hongwei again), attempts to buy the DVD of Xiao Wu, the film.

=== Wider success ===
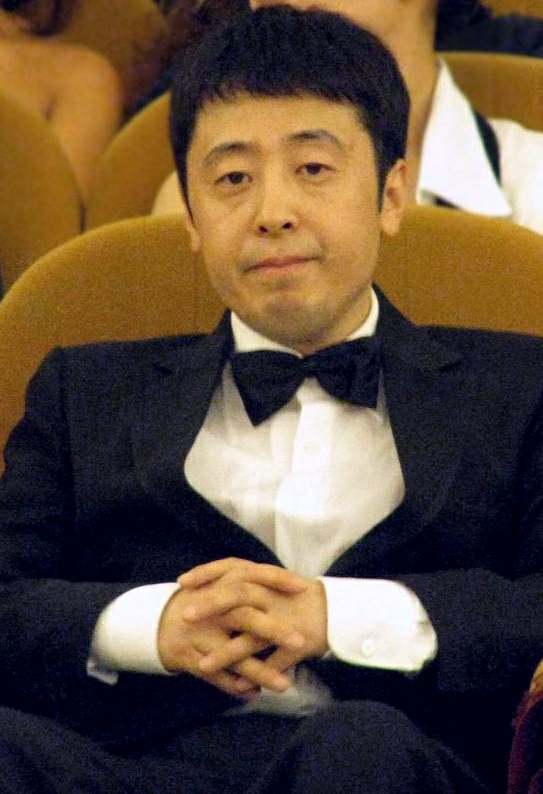
Jia at the 65th Venice International Film Festival

Beginning with 2004's The World, Jia began to work with official approval from the Chinese government. The shift from independent to state-approved was not in isolation, however, but was part of a broader movement by many "underground" film directors turning legitimate. For many critics, the shift to legitimacy did not blunt Jia's critical eye, and The World was well received both abroad and – somewhat surprisingly – by the Chinese government. Taking place in Beijing World Park, the film was also Jia's first to take place outside of his home province of Shanxi.

In 2006, Jia returned to his experimentation with digital film with his film Still Life. The film would see Jia's status both at home and abroad raised when it won the coveted Golden Lion in the 2006 Venice Film Festival. The film, a diptych film about two people searching for their spouses in the backdrop of the Three Gorges Dam, was accompanied by the companion documentary Dong, about artist Liu Xiaodong.

The 2000s have seen Jia at a prolific period of his career. Following the success of Still Life, Jia was reported to be working on a gangster film, The Age of Tattoo ("Ciqing shidai"). Originally planned to be released in 2007, production on The Age of Tattoo was delayed after lead Jay Chou pulled out of the project, with Jia moving on to other films. These included a second documentary, Useless, about China's clothing manufacturing business, which garnered the director the Orizzonti Doc Prize at Venice in 2008, and 24 City, an ambitious work that conveys the historic changes that have swept across China in the last half-century through the lens of a single factory and the people connected to it by labor and blood. At the London Film Festival, 24 City was accompanied by another Jia short film, Cry Me a River, a romance starring Summer Palace actors, Hao Lei and Guo Xiaodong, and Jia regulars Zhao Tao and Wang Hongwei.

I Wish I Knew is a documentary exploring the changing face of Shanghai. I Wish I Knew debuted in the Un certain regard competition in the 2010 Cannes Film Festival.

During the press conference of 18 April 2013, Jia's film Tian Zhu Ding (A Touch of Sin) was nominated for the Palme d'Or at the 2013 Cannes Film Festival. He won the award for Best Screenplay. In April 2014, he was announced as a member of the main competition jury at the 2014 Cannes Film Festival.

His 2015 film Mountains May Depart was selected to compete for the Palme d'Or at the 2015 Cannes Film Festival.

In August 2016, Jia was appointed dean of the Shanghai Vancouver Film School at Shanghai University.

In October 2017, Jia announced the establishment of the Pingyao International Film Festival (PYIFF) in Shanxi.

In April 2021, Jia was appointed dean of the Shanxi Film Academy of Shanxi Media College.

In April 2024, Jia's new film Caught by the Tides was selected into the main competition of the Cannes Film Festival and participated in the competition for the highest award "Palme d'Or".

=== Style and influences ===
Compared to other sixth generation directors, Jia's works are more experimental and durational. Jia's films treat themes of alienated youth, contemporary Chinese history and globalization, as well as his signature usage of the long-take, colorful digital video and his minimalist/realist style. The World, in particular, with its portrayal of gaudy theme park filled with recreations of foreign landmarks is often noted for its critique of the globalization of China.

Jia's work speaks to a vision of "authentic" Chinese life, and his consistent return to the themes of alienation and disorientation fly in the face of the work of older filmmakers who present more idealized understandings of Chinese society. Critic Howard Feinstein described the director as a "rare breed of filmmaker capable of combining stunning artifice with documentary truth."

Jia argues that the longshot is "democratic" as the viewer is able to freely navigate the screen and is not ordered by zooms, cuts and close-ups. Slowness, deliberate long-takes, minimal cuts and an often stationary camera appear in his films.

Each of your films is precious for its insight into Chinese society but also into the solitude and spiritual journey present in humanity. You are the witness to these lives

— The French directors' society in a letter sent to Jia Zhangke.

Critics have noted that whereas "Fifth Generation" filmmakers such as Zhang Yimou churn out export-friendly and lushly-colored wuxia dramas, Jia, as a "Sixth Generation" filmmaker, rejects the idealization of these narratives in favor of a more nuanced style. His films—from Xiao Wu and Unknown Pleasures to Platform and The World—eschew the son et lumière that characterizes so many contemporary Chinese exports. But the films' recurrent and reflexive use of "pop" motifs ensure that they are more self-aware than the similarly documentarian Chinese films of Jia's Sixth Generation peers.

Jia's works are often compared with Italian neorealism. Jia has commented in the past on the influence of filmmakers Hou Hsiao-hsien and Yasujirō Ozu and others on his work. He is deeply affected by Robert Bresson's use of nonprofessional actors. I Wish I Knew, a 2010 documentary of his, features a segment about the 1972 documentary Chung Kuo, by Michelangelo Antonioni – another filmmaker to whose work Jia's own has been compared. Contemporary Chinese film director Wei Shujun also noted a European influence on Sixth Generation directors, highlighting Jia.

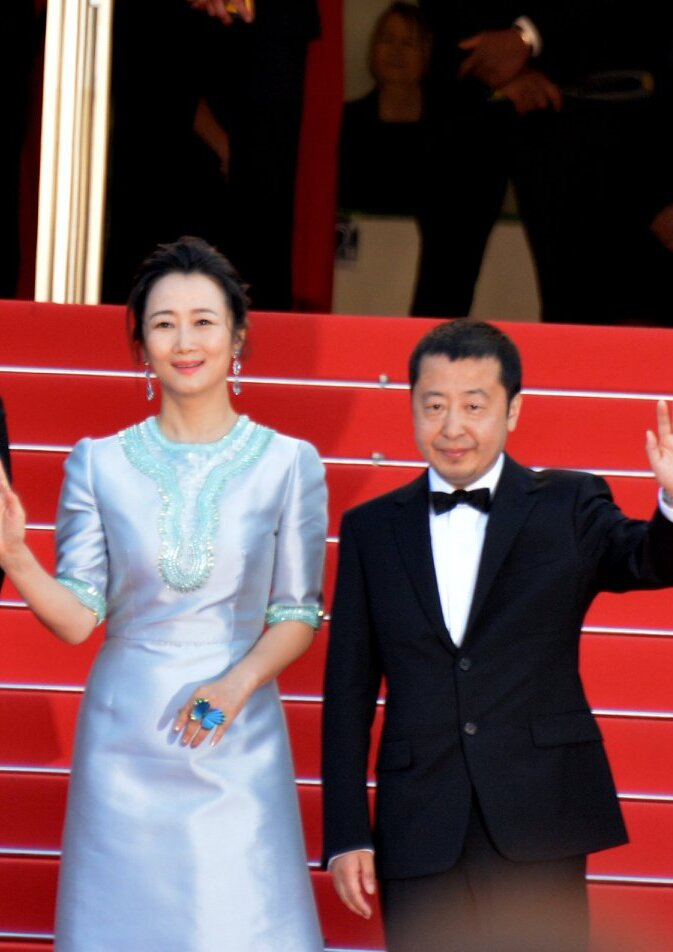
Jia and his wife, the Chinese actress Zhao Tao at the 2008 Cannes Film Festival.

== Personal life ==
He is married to his long-time collaborator and muse Zhao Tao in 2012. She starred in all of his films since Platform (2000).

=== Political views ===
In 2011, Jia criticised Chinese film censorship at a cultural forum in Shanghai, and described it as "cultural over-cleanliness". When China's National Radio and Television Administration in 2021 published guidelines that limited actors with the "wrong" politics, morals, or aesthetics, while TV show hosts would need to be licensed by authorities, Jia spoke out against the proposed regulation, and said art creation should be "eclectic".

In December 2023, alongside 50 other filmmakers, Jia Zhangke signed an open letter published in Libération demanding a ceasefire and an end to the killing of civilians amid the 2023 Israeli invasion of the Gaza Strip, and for a humanitarian corridor into Gaza to be established for humanitarian aid, and the release of hostages.

== Filmography ==
=== Feature films ===
Year	English title	Original Title	Notes
1995	Xiao Shan Going Home	小山回家	Student film featurette.
1997	Xiao Wu	小武	Also known as Pickpocket
2000	Platform	站台	
2002	Unknown Pleasures	任逍遥	
2004	The World	世界	
2006	Still Life	三峡好人	Golden Lion
2008	24 City	二十四城记/二十四城記	
2013	A Touch of Sin	天注定	Cannes Film Festival Award for Best Screenplay
2015	Mountains May Depart	山河故人	
2018	Ash Is Purest White	江湖儿女	
2024	Caught by the Tides	风流一代	
TBA	Mamma Dunhuang		

=== Documentaries ===
Year	English title	Original Title
2006	Dong	东
2007	Useless	无用
2010	I Wish I Knew	海上传奇
2020	Swimming Out Till the Sea Turns Blue	一直游到海水变蓝

=== Short films ===
Year	English title	Original Title	Notes
1994	One Day in Beijing	有一天，在北京	Student film.
1996	Du Du	嘟嘟	Student film.
2001	In Public	公共场所	Documentary
2001	The Condition of Dogs	狗的状况	Documentary
2007	Our Ten Years	我们的十年	
2008	Cry Me a River	河上的爱情	
2008	Black Breakfast	黑色早餐	Documentary. Segment in the anthology film Stories on Human Rights.
2009	Remembrance	十年	Documentary.
2011	Cao Fei		Documentary. Segment in the anthology film Yulu.
2011	Pan Shiyi		Documentary. Segment in the anthology film Yulu.
2011	untitled short		Documentary. Segment in the anthology film 3.11 Sense of Home.
2013	untitled short		Documentary. Segment in the anthology film Venice 70: Future Reloaded.
2015	Smog Journeys	人在霾途	
2016	The Hedonists	营生	
2017	Revive	逢春	Segment in the anthology film Where Has Time Gone?.
2019	The Bucket	一个桶	Promotional Chinese New Year film for Apple
2026	Torino Shadow	都灵之影	

=== As actor ===
Year	Title	Director	Role
2002	Overloaded Peking	Dominique Musorrafiti, Matteo Damiani	Himself
2002	Unknown Pleasures	Jia Zhangke	Man singing in the street
2003	My Camera Does Not Lie	Solveig Klassen, Katharina Schneider-Roos	Himself
2006	Karmic Mahjong	Wang Guangli	Mobster
2014	The Continent	Han Han	Cameo appearance
2023	Art College 1994	Liu Jian	Gu Yongqing (voice role)
2024	Black Dog	Guan Hu	Uncle Yao

=== As producer ===
(Excluding production credits for Jia's own directorial efforts.)

Year	Title	Director	Notes
2003	All Tomorrow's Parties	Yu Lik-wai	
2006	Walking on the Wild Side	Han Jie	
2008	Plastic City	Yu Lik-wai	
2011	Mr. Tree	Han Jie	Executive producer
2012	Memories Look at Me	Song Fang	
2012	Fidaï	Damien Ounouri	Documentary
2013	Forgetting to Know You	Quan Ling	
2015	K	Emyr ap Richard and Darhad Erdenibulag	
2016	Life After Life	Zhang Hanyi	
2017	One Night on the Wharf	Han Dong	
2018	Dead Pigs	Cathy Yan	
2018	Half the Sky	Daniela Thomas, Elizaveta Stishova, Ashwiny Iyer Tiwari, Liu Yulin, Sara Blecher	Anthology film Executive producer
2019	Number One	Ah Nian	
2020	The Calming	Song Fang	
2020	Tracing Her Shadow	Pengfei	Executive producer
2020	The Best Is Yet to Come	Wang Jing	Executive producer
2020	A Song for You	Dukar Tserang	Executive producer
2021	Tomorrow Will Be Fine	Yuan Yuan	Executive producer
2021	Memoria	Apichatpong Weerasethakul	Co-producer
2021	White Building	Kavich Neang	Co-producer
2026	Filipiñana	Rafael Manuel	Executive producer

== See also ==
- Xstream Pictures – Jia Zhangke's production company, founded with Yu Lik-wai and Chow Keung

== Works ==
- Jia Zhangke Speaks Out: The Chinese Film Director's Texts on Film. Piscataway, NJ: Transaction Publishers, 2014.
- The World of Jia Zhangke Jean-Michel Frodon, Sally Schafto (translator), Foreword by Dudley Andrew. Film Desk Books. NY. 2021
- Jia Zhangke, a Guy from Fenyang documentary by Walter Salles, 2014
