= Still Life (2006 film) =

2006 Chinese film directed by Jia Zhangke

- Film poster

Chinese name
- Traditional Chinese: 三峽好人
- Simplified Chinese: 三峡好人
- Literal meaning: Good People of the Three Gorges
Transcriptions
Standard Mandarin
- Hanyu Pinyin: Sānxiá Hǎorén
- Directed by: Jia Zhangke
- Written by: Jia Zhangke; Sun Jianming; Guan Na
- Produced by: Xu Pengle; Wang Tianyun; Zhu Jiong
- Starring: Zhao Tao; Han Sanming
- Cinematography: Yu Lik-wai
- Edited by: Kong Jinglei
- Music by: Lim Giong
- Distributed by: Xstream Pictures
- Release dates: September 5, 2006 (Venice); January 18, 2008 (United States)
- Running time: 108 minutes
- Country: China
- Languages: Standard Mandarin Chinese; Jin Chinese; Sichuanese

Still Life (Chinese: 三峡好人; pinyin: Sānxiá Hǎorén) is a 2006 Chinese film directed by Jia Zhangke. Shot in the old village of Fengjie, a small town on the Yangtze River slowly being destroyed by the building of the Three Gorges Dam, Still Life tells the story of two people in search of their spouses. Still Life is a co-production of the Shanghai Film Studio and Xstream Pictures.

The film premiered at the 2006 Venice Film Festival and was a winner of the Golden Lion Award for Best Film. It premiered at a handful of other film festivals and received a limited commercial release in the United States on January 18, 2008, in New York City.

Like The World, Jia's previous film, Still Life was accepted by Chinese authorities and was shown uncensored in both mainland China and abroad.

== Plot ==
Fengjie, a county upstream of the Three Gorges Dam, is marked for flooding and undergoes a process of demolition. Han Sanming, a coal miner from Shanxi, returns to the dying county in search of his bought wife, who ran away with their daughter 16 years ago. Upon arriving, he asks to be driven to his former address, only to discover that the neighborhood has already been flooded. After a failed attempt to obtain his wife's information from the local municipal office, he visits a rickety boat owned by his wife's brother. The brother informs Sanming that his wife and daughter work downriver in Yichang but that if he remains in the county, they will eventually return. Sanming decides to wait and in the meantime gets a job in a demolition crew with the help of a local teen gangster, Brother Mark.

In a second story, nurse Shen Hong arrives in Fengjie in search of her husband Guo Bin, who left their home in Shanxi two years earlier and has only made token attempts to keep in contact. She enlists the help of her husband's friend Wang Dongming, who lets her stay at his home but will not tell whether Bin is having an affair. Hong discovers that Bin is now a successful businessman, and that he is indeed having an affair with his wealthy investor. When Bin and Hong finally meet, she simply walks away. Bin pursues her and the two seemingly reconcile in a dance, but she then tells him that she has fallen in love with someone else and asks for a divorce. When he asks with whom and when she had fallen in love, she responds that it does not matter. The two part ways, and Hong later rides a cruise ship alone down the Gorges.

Sanming has been working on demolishing buildings for some time when Mark is found dead. Whether he died in an accident or was murdered by a rival gang is left unclear. Soon afterward, Sanming's brother-in-law calls to inform him that his wife, Missy Ma, has returned. Sanming asks why she left him; she answers she was too young to know better. She tells him that their daughter works further south in Dongguan, and that she works for a boat owner to pay off her brother's debt. Sanming attempts to take her with him, but is informed that he will have to pay 30,000 RMB to cover the debt. He promises to do so, and decides to return to Shanxi to work in the mines. After hearing how well mining pays, his new friends and coworkers ask to join him, but Sanming reminds them that the work is very dangerous. Sanming and his friends are then seen preparing to depart Fengjie.

== Cast ==
- Han Sanming as Han Sanming. The character Han Sanming is a coal miner from Shanxi province who has returned to Fengjie in search of his wife and daughter, neither of whom he has seen in 16 years.
- Zhao Tao as Shen Hong, a nurse, also from Shanxi, who has come to Fengjie in search of her husband, who has barely been in touch for two years.
- Li Zhubing as Guo Bin, Shen Hong's husband.
- Wang Hongwei as Wang Dongming, an archaeologist working in the ruined lots in Fengjie and a friend of Guo Bin's who helps Shen Hong track him down.
- Ma Lizhen as Missy Ma, Han Sanming's erstwhile wife.
- Zhou Lin as Brother Mark, a young laborer who befriends Han Sanming.
- Luo Mingwang as Brother Ma, Missy Ma's brother

== Production ==
Filmed on location in Fengjie, Still Life was shot entirely on high-definition digital video by cinematographer Yu Lik-wai. The filming started in late 2005 and most of the scenes were done in Fengjie. Because of the city's status as a site for invaluable ancient relics and also the controversial construction of the then-ongoing Three Gorges Dam project.

Casting was primarily with Jia regulars, including the two leads, Zhao Tao (who has appeared in every Jia film since 2000's Platform) and Han Sanming (who also appeared in Jia's The World). Also appearing in a minor role is Wang Hongwei, who often acts as Jia's onscreen alter ego (Xiao Wu, Platform). The film's crew also consists of frequent Jia collaborators. Most notable among these are cinematographer Yu Lik-wai (The World, Platform, Unknown Pleasures, Xiao Wu), composer Lim Giong (Useless, Dong, The World) and editor Kong Jinglei (Platform, The World).

Unlike many of his contemporaries (and indeed unlike many of Jia's own films), Still Life was approved by the Chinese Film Bureau, SARFT, and was co-produced by the state-operated Shanghai Film Studio. Jia suggested that this support was due to the fact that the "impact of the Three Gorges project is phenomenal. It's not something the government can cover up."

Still Life was given a brief theatrical run in China (opening on the same day as the big-budget Curse of the Golden Flower) and also heavily bootlegged.

== Soundtrack ==
The soundtrack, by the Taiwanese musician Lim Giong, is mostly electronic, with elements of Chinese folk song. Parts of it are collected on the 2007 album Jia Zhangke Movie Music Collection 賈樟柯電影音樂作品集. In addition, several songs are sung or played during the film:

- "Mice Love Rice" 老鼠愛大米 (2004), a song that gained popularity online, is sung by a boy in the boarding house at which Han Sanming stays.
- "Good People Enjoy Peaceful Lives" 好人一生平安 (1990), originally sung by Li Na, is Han Sanming's ringtone.
- "Shanghai Beach" 上海灘 (1980), the Cantonese theme song to the television show The Bund originally performed by Frances Yip, is Brother Mark's ringtone.
- "Two Butterflies" 兩隻蝴蝶 (2004), originally sung by Pang Long, is sung by a boy on the boat on which Shen Hong arrives.
- "A Drenched Heart" 潮濕的心 (1994), originally sung by Gan Ping 甘萍, is played when Shen Hong and Wang Dongming visit a terrace in search for Shen Hong's husband.
- "Any Empty Wine Bottles for Sale?" 酒矸倘賣無 (1983), the theme song to Papa, Can You Hear Me Sing originally sung by Su Rui, is sung by a performer Han Sanming sees.

== Style ==
As in many of Jia's works, Still Life's pacing is stately but slow. Unlike his earlier works, notably Platform, Jia's camerawork in Still Life is constantly on the move, panning across men and vistas. Slow pans of men and landscapes mark the film's visual style. Shelly Kraicer notes that the slow, lingering cameras create tableaux of both bodies ("male, copiously presented, and frequently half nude") and landscapes ("long, slow, 180-degree pans that turn vast fields of rubble, waste, and half-decayed, soon-to-be demolished buildings into epic tableaux"). This visual trope has drawn references to the Italian master Michelangelo Antonioni and many of his works about urban displacement. Manohla Dargis drew a connection between Jia and Antonioni in regard to the opening shot, wherein the camera pans slowly across a long boat full of passengers; she writes, "In Still Life [Jia] uses human bodies as moving space, to borrow Michelangelo Antonioni's peerless phrase, but with enormous tenderness." She continues: "Antonioni's influence on Mr. Jia is pronounced, evident in the younger filmmaker's manipulation of real time and the ways he expresses his ideas with images rather than through dialogue and narrative." David Denby of The New Yorker also made the Antonioni connection in reference to the film's story, wherein "Inanition and mere things have overwhelmed the human presence, as in one of Antonioni's empty urban landscapes."

Visually, the film's use of high definition similarly creates unusually "crisp" imagery that draws attention to the beauty of both the natural environment and the decaying urban landscape.

The film has also drawn notice for its surreal and fantastic elements. They range from subtle (the tightrope walker near the end of the film) to the obvious, including two CGI images: one of a UFO, which serves to divide the stories of Shen Hong and Sanming, and a modernist building that launches upward like a rocket. Jia also uses four single-character title cards: "Cigarettes", "Liquor", "Tea", and "Candy." Some critics found this arbitrary, but Shelly Kraicer writes of the title cards:

They stand in as replacements for the standard four household items (fuel, rice, cooking oil, and salt) that represent the daily necessities of life in a set Chinese expression. Jia's update replaces survival with pleasures, even addictions. Those looking to find support for an ambivalent interior critique of the concomitant pleasures and dangers of turning cinema itself into a series of tantalizingly consumable items could do worse than start here.

== Reception ==
Still Life premiered in the 2006 Venice Film Festival, where it won the film festival's top prize, the Golden Lion award. With its win, the film's profile was instantly raised. Upon seeing its success, Chinese press also gave the film and its director favorable coverage.

On the review aggregator website Rotten Tomatoes, the film holds an approval rating of 91% based on 55 reviews, with an average rating of 7.9/10. The website's critics consensus reads, "Zhangke spellbindingly captures the human cost of rapid industrialization in modern China." Metacritic, which uses a weighted average, assigned the film a score of 81 out of 100, based on 10 critics, indicating "universal acclaim".

The film received acclaim from critics after its limited U.S. release in January 2008. New York Times critic Manohla Dargis wrote that it "exists on a continuum with the modernist masters, among other influences, but [that Jia] is very much an artist of his own specific time and place." Other critics, like J. Hoberman of The Village Voice, praised the film and noted the more political undertones, consciously drawing contrast to the Fifth Generation director Zhang Yimou and his more recent big-budget epics. At the end of 2008, Village Voice and LA Weekly's annual film poll of film critics ranked Still Life the fourth-best film of the year, and Film Comment, official journal of the Film Society of Lincoln Center's annual poll of 100 film critics, ranked it the sixth-best of the year, with 521 points. The film was voted the third-best film of the past decade in a survey by the Toronto International Film Festival's Cinematheque, composed of 60 film experts from around the world.

=== Top ten lists ===
The film appeared on many critics' top ten lists of the best films of 2008.

- 1st - Scott Foundas, LA Weekly (tied with Fengming, a Chinese Memoir)
- 3rd - Ella Taylor, LA Weekly (tied with Up the Yangtze)
- 6th - Bill White, Seattle Post-Intelligencer
- 6th - Joe Morgenstern, The Wall Street Journal
- 6th - Sheri Linden, The Hollywood Reporter
- 8th - Peter Rainer, The Christian Science Monitor
- 9th - Manohla Dargis, The New York Times
- 9th - Michael Phillips, Chicago Tribune

Still Life was 75th on Slant Magazine's list of the best films of the 2000s.

In 2025, the film was showcased in the section 'Decisive Moments in Asian Cinema' at the 30th Busan International Film Festival, as part of the special "Asian Cinema 100", being the signature work of the director Jia Zhangke.

=== Awards and nominations ===
- 2006 Venice Film Festival
  - Winner of the Golden Lion
  - Official Selection
- 2006 Asian Film Awards
  - Winner of Best Director, Jia Zhangke
  - Best Picture (nominee)
  - Best Composer, Lim Giong (nominee)
- 2007 Adelaide Film Festival
  - Winner of the NATUZZI International Award for Best Feature Film
- 2007 Valdivia International Film Festival
  - Winner of Best International Feature Film
  - Winner, Best Actor, Han Sanming
- 2007 Tromsø International Film Festival
  - Winner of the FIPRESCI Prize
- 2007 Durban International Film Festival
  - Winner of Best Direction
- 2008 Los Angeles Film Critics Association Awards
  - Winner: Best Foreign Language Film
  - Winner: Best Cinematography (Yu Lik-wai)

== See also ==
- Dong, Jia's documentary companion piece to Still Life, filmed at approximately the same time.
