= The Best Is Yet to Come (2020 film) =

2020 Chinese drama film

- Film poster
- Directed by: Wang Jing
- Screenplay by: Chen Chengfeng; Hwong Minmin; Huang Wei; Li Jingrui
- Produced by: Tang Yan; Jia Zhangke; Liu Xiaozhao; Zhang Li
- Starring: White K; Miao Miao; Zhang Songwen; Song Yang
- Cinematography: Yu Lik-wai
- Edited by: Matthieu Laclau
- Music by: Yoshihiro Hanno
- Production company: Momo Pictures
- Release dates: September 9, 2020 (Venice Film Festival); March 24, 2023 (China)
- Running time: 115 minutes
- Country: China
- Language: Mandarin Chinese

The Best Is Yet to Come (Chinese: 不止不休, Bu zhi bu xiu) is a 2020 Chinese drama film directed by Wang Jing, in his feature film debut.

The film is based on the real figure of journalist Han Fudong, who exposed the social stigma against hepatitis B-suffering people in China. It premiered in the Horizons section of the 77th edition of the Venice Film Festival, and was later screened at the 2020 Toronto International Film Festival. The film was later released in China on March 24, 2023.

== Cast ==
- White K as Han Dong
- Miao Miao as Xiao Zhu
- Zhang Songwen as Huang Jiang
- Song Yang as Zhang Bo
- Lie Wang as Biao
- Yemang Zhou as Chief Editor
- Qin Hailu as Mrs. Huang

== Release ==
The Best Is Yet to Come premiered at the 77th Venice International Film Festival under the Horizons section on September 9, 2020.

The film was later theatrically released in China on March 24, 2023. It earned CN¥52.3 million for its first week.

=== Reception ===
On Rotten Tomatoes, the film has an approval rating of 81% based on 16 reviews.
