= Plastic City (film) =

2008 film by Yu Lik-wai

- Hong Kong release poster
- Directed by: Yu Lik-wai
- Written by: Liu Fendou; Danilo Gullane; Fernando Bonassi; Yu Lik-wai
- Produced by: Jia Zhangke; Chow Keung; Tsui Siu-Ming; Yūji Sadai; Gabriel Lacerda; Débora Ivanov; Fabiano Gullane; Caio Gullane
- Starring: Anthony Wong; Joe Odagiri; Domingos Antonio
- Cinematography: Lai Yiu-fai
- Edited by: Wenders Li
- Music by: Yoshihiro Hanno
- Production companies: Bitters End; Gullane Filmes; Novo Films; Sundream Motion Pictures; Xstream Pictures
- Distributed by: Bitters End (Japan); Paris Filmes (Brazil)
- Release dates: September 8, 2008 (Toronto International Film Festival); March 14, 2009 (Japan); June 11, 2009 (Hong Kong); October 30, 2009 (China); January 22, 2010 (Brazil)
- Running time: 118 minutes
- Countries: Brazil; China; Hong Kong; Japan
- Languages: Mandarin; Portuguese; Japanese
- Budget: R$5.5 million

Plastic City (Chinese: 荡寇; pinyin: Dangkou) is a 2008 thriller film directed by Yu Lik-wai. The film is co-produced by Brazil, China, Hong Kong, and Japan.

== Plot ==
Set in São Paulo's Liberdade district, home to a large Asian diaspora, Plastic City follows Yuda, a Chinese immigrant, and his adopted son Kirin as they operate a counterfeit merchandise syndicate. Their criminal enterprise faces collapse when targeted by a powerful international organization.

== Cast ==
- Anthony Wong as Yuda
- Joe Odagiri as Kirin
- Domingos Antonio as Federal Agent
- Alessandro Azevedo as Camacho
- Ricardo Bittencourt as Guilhermo
- Chao Chen as Yanno
- Rodrigo dos Santos as Marquito
- Barbara Garcia as Black Dancer
- Huang Yi as Ocho
- Renata Jesion as Reporter
- Hiyan Kubagawa as Kirin 5 Years
- Tainá Müller as Rita
- Eliseu Paranhos as Sheriff
- Antônio Petrin as Coelho
- David Pond as Uncle Tong
- Felipe Eduardo Salvador as Chapinha
- Babu Santana as Beto
- Thogun as Ignacio
