= All Tomorrow's Parties (2003 film) =

2003 film

- Film poster for French release
- Directed by: Yu Lik-wai
- Written by: Yu Lik-wai
- Produced by: Li Kit Ming; Hengameh Panahi
- Starring: Diao Yinan; Cho Yong-won
- Cinematography: Lai Yiu-Fai
- Edited by: Chow Keung
- Music by: Yoshihiro Hanno
- Production companies: Lumen Films; Hu Tong Communications; TeleImage
- Release date: 17 May 2003 (Cannes)
- Running time: 96 minutes
- Country: China
- Language: Mandarin Chinese

All Tomorrow's Parties (Chinese: 明日天涯; pinyin: Míngrì tiānyá) is a 2003 Chinese science fiction film directed by Yu Lik-wai. It was screened in the Un Certain Regard section at the 2003 Cannes Film Festival.

== Cast ==
- Cho Yong-won as Xuelan
- Diao Yinan as Xiao Zhuai
- Na Ren as Lanlan
- Zhao Weiwei as Xiao Mian
