= Wu Qiong =

Chinese field hockey player

Personal information
- Born: 28 April 1989 (age 37)
- Height: 1.67 m (5 ft 6 in)
- Weight: 59 kg (130 lb)

Sport
- Sport: Field hockey
National team
Years	Team	Caps	Goals
–	China	49	-
Medal record
Women's field hockey
Representing China
Asian Champions Trophy
Bronze medal – third place	2018 Donghae

Wu Qiong (born 28 April 1989) is a Chinese field hockey player.

She competed for the China women's national field hockey team at the 2016 Summer Olympics.
