= Love Will Tear Us Apart (1999 film) =

1999 Hong Kong film by Yu Lik-wai

- Film poster
- Traditional Chinese: 天上人間
- Simplified Chinese: 天上人间
- Hanyu Pinyin: Tiān Shàng Rén Jiān
- Jyutping: Tin1 Seong2 Jan4 Gaan1
- Directed by: Yu Lik-wai
- Written by: Yu Lik-wai
- Produced by: Stanley Kwan; Tony Leung Ka-fai
- Starring: Tony Leung Ka-fai
- Cinematography: Lai Yiu-fai
- Edited by: Chow Keung
- Production companies: Hu Tong Communications; Tony Leung Productions
- Release date: 17 May 1999
- Running time: 109 minutes
- Country: Hong Kong
- Language: Cantonese

Love Will Tear Us Apart (Chinese: 天上人間; pinyin: Tiānshàng rénjiān) is a 1999 Hong Kong drama film written and directed by Yu Lik-wai, produced by and starring Tony Leung Ka-fai. It was entered into the 1999 Cannes Film Festival.

== Cast ==
- Tony Leung Ka-fai as Jian
- Wong Ning as Yin
- Lü Liping as Yan
- Rolf Chow as Chun
- Simon Chung as Man in subway
- Gorretti Mak as Woman in elevator
