= Yu Lik-wai =

Hong Kong cinematographer and film director

- Born: 12 August 1966 (age 60); Hong Kong
- Other name: Nelson Yu
- Occupations: Cinematographer, film director, producer
- Years active: 1990s-present
- Awards: LAFCA Award for Best Cinematography; 2008 Still Life

Chinese name
- Traditional Chinese: 余力爲
- Simplified Chinese: 余力为
Transcriptions
Standard Mandarin
- Hanyu Pinyin: Yú Lìwéi
Yue: Cantonese
- Jyutping: Yu4 Lik6 Wai4

Yu Lik-wai (simplified Chinese: 余力为; traditional Chinese: 余力爲; pinyin: Yú Lìwéi; Jyutping: Yu4 Lik6 Wai4; born 12 August 1966), sometimes credited as Nelson Yu, is a Hong Kong cinematographer, film director, and occasional film producer. Born in Hong Kong, Yu Lik-wai was educated at Belgium's INSAS (Institut National Superieur des Arts de Spectacle) where he graduated with a degree in cinematography in 1994. Yu has become a mainstay in both the cinemas of China (where he is perhaps best known for his collaborations with director Jia Zhangke) and Hong Kong.

Yu has served as director of photography for nearly all of Chinese director Jia Zhangke's films, and along with Jia, founded their own independent film production company, Xstream Pictures.

He has been announced as a member of the jury for the Cinéfoundation and Short Films sections of the 2012 Cannes Film Festival.

== Filmography ==
=== As cinematographer ===
| Year | English title | Original title | Director | Notes |
|---|---|---|---|---|
| 1996 | N/A | L'heure grise | Julian Selleron | Short film |
| 1997 | Xiao Wu | 小武 | Jia Zhangke | |
| 1999 | Ordinary Heroes | 千言萬語 | Ann Hui | |
| 2000 | In the Mood for Love | 花樣年華 | Wong Kar-wai | Second unit |
| 2000 | Platform | 站台 | Jia Zhangke | |
| 2001 | In Public | 公共场所 | Jia Zhangke | Documentary short film |
| 2002 | Unknown Pleasures | 任逍遥 | Jia Zhangke | |
| 2004 | The World | 世界 | Jia Zhangke | |
| 2006 | Still Life | 三峡好人 | Jia Zhangke | |
| 2006 | Dong | 东 | Jia Zhangke | Documentary |
| 2006 | The Postmodern Life of My Aunt | 姨媽的後現代生活 | Ann Hui | |
| 2007 | Getting Home | 落叶归根 | Zhang Yang | |
| 2007 | Useless | 无用 | Jia Zhangke | Documentary |
| 2008 | Stories on Human Rights | | Jia Zhangke | Segment "Black Breakfast" (黑色早餐) |
| 2008 | Ten Years | 十年 | Jia Zhangke | Short film |
| 2008 | 24 City | 二十四城记 | Jia Zhangke | |
| 2010 | I Wish I Knew | 海上传奇 | Jia Zhangke | Documentary |
| 2010 | Dream Home | 維多利亞壹號 | Pang Ho-cheung | |
| 2011 | Yulu | 语路 | Chen Tao, Chen Zhiheng, Jia Zhangke, Tan Chui Mui, Song Fang, Wang Zizhao, Wei Tie | Documentary anthology film |
| 2011 | Sauna on Moon | 嫦娥 | Zou Peng | |
| 2011 | Love and Bruises | 花 | Lou Ye | |
| 2011 | A Simple Life | 桃姐 | Ann Hui | |
| 2011 | 3.11 A Sense of Home Films | | Jia Zhangke | Segment |
| 2011 | N/A | 爱的联想 | Wang Jing, Chen Tao, Wei Xing | Documentary short series |
| 2013 | Forgetting to Know You | 忘了去懂你 | Quan Ling | |
| 2013 | Beloved | 亲・爱 | Li Xinman | |
| 2013 | A Touch of Sin | 天注定 | Jia Zhangke | |
| 2015 | Cities in Love | 恋爱中的城市 | Dong Runnian | Segment "Shanghai" (上海) |
| 2015 | Mountains May Depart | 山河故人 | Jia Zhangke | |
| 2016 | The Hedonists | 营生 | Jia Zhangke | Short film |
| 2017 | Our Time Will Come | 明月幾時有 | Ann Hui | |
| 2017 | The Conformist | 冰之下 | Cai Shangjun | |
| 2020 | Swimming Out Till the Sea Turns Blue | 一直游到海水变蓝 | Jia Zhangke | Documentary |
| 2020 | The Best Is Yet to Come | 不止不休 | Wang Jing | |
| 2021 | Nian | 阿年 | Lulu Wang | Short film |
| 2023 | Heaven and Hell | 一刀天堂 | Huang Chao-liang | |

=== As director ===
| Year | English title | Original title | Notes |
|---|---|---|---|
| 1996 | Neon Goddesses | 美麗的魂魄 | Documentary |
| 1999 | Love Will Tear Us Apart | 天上人間 | Entered at Cannes |
| 2003 | All Tomorrow's Parties | 明日天涯 | |
| 2008 | Plastic City | 蕩寇 | |
| 2024 | Wild Punch | 终极格斗 | Co-director with Wang Jing |
