= Zhao Tao =

Chinese actress (born 1977)

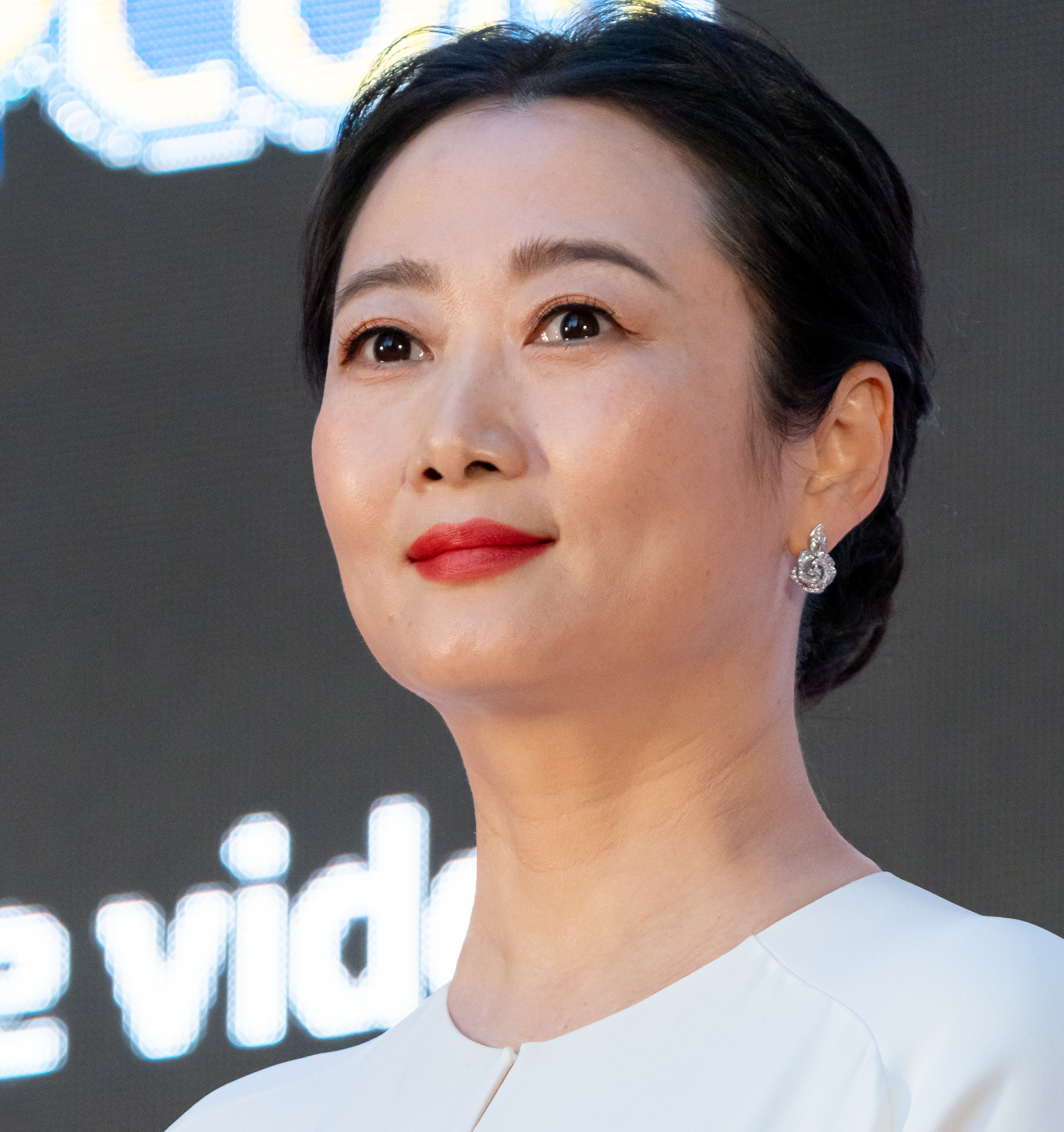
- Zhao in 2023
- Born: 28 January 1977 (age 49); Taiyuan, China
- Occupations: Actress, producer
- Years active: 1999–present
- Spouse: Jia Zhangke (m. 2012)
- Awards: David di Donatello Award – Best Actress; 2012 Shun Li and the Poet

Chinese name
- Simplified Chinese: 赵涛
- Traditional Chinese: 趙濤
Transcriptions
Standard Mandarin
- Hanyu Pinyin: Zhào Tāo
- IPA: [ʈʂâʊ tʰáʊ]

Zhao Tao (born 28 January 1977) is a Chinese actress. She works in China and occasionally Europe, and has appeared in 10 films and several shorts since starting her career in 1999. She is best known for her collaborations with her husband, director Jia Zhangke, including Platform (2000) and Still Life (2006). With Shun Li and the Poet (2011), she became the first Asian actress to win a prize at David di Donatello. She received two Golden Horse Award nominations for Mountains May Depart (2015) and Ash Is Purest White (2018). In 2020, The New York Times ranked her #8 on its list of the 25 Greatest Actors of the 21st Century.

== Biography ==
Zhao was born 28 January 1977 in Taiyuan, Shanxi, which is also the hometown of the heroine in Still Life. As a child, she studied classical Chinese dance. In 1996, she enrolled in the folk dance department at Beijing Dance Academy. After graduation, she became a dance teacher in Taiyuan Normal College, where she was spotted by Jia during casting for Platform. Since then, they have worked together frequently.

In 2011, she starred in the Italian film Shun Li and the Poet by Andrea Segre, which screened in the Venice Days section of the 68th Venice International Film Festival. Zhao won the David di Donatello Award, the Italian Oscar, for Best Actress for her bilingual role.

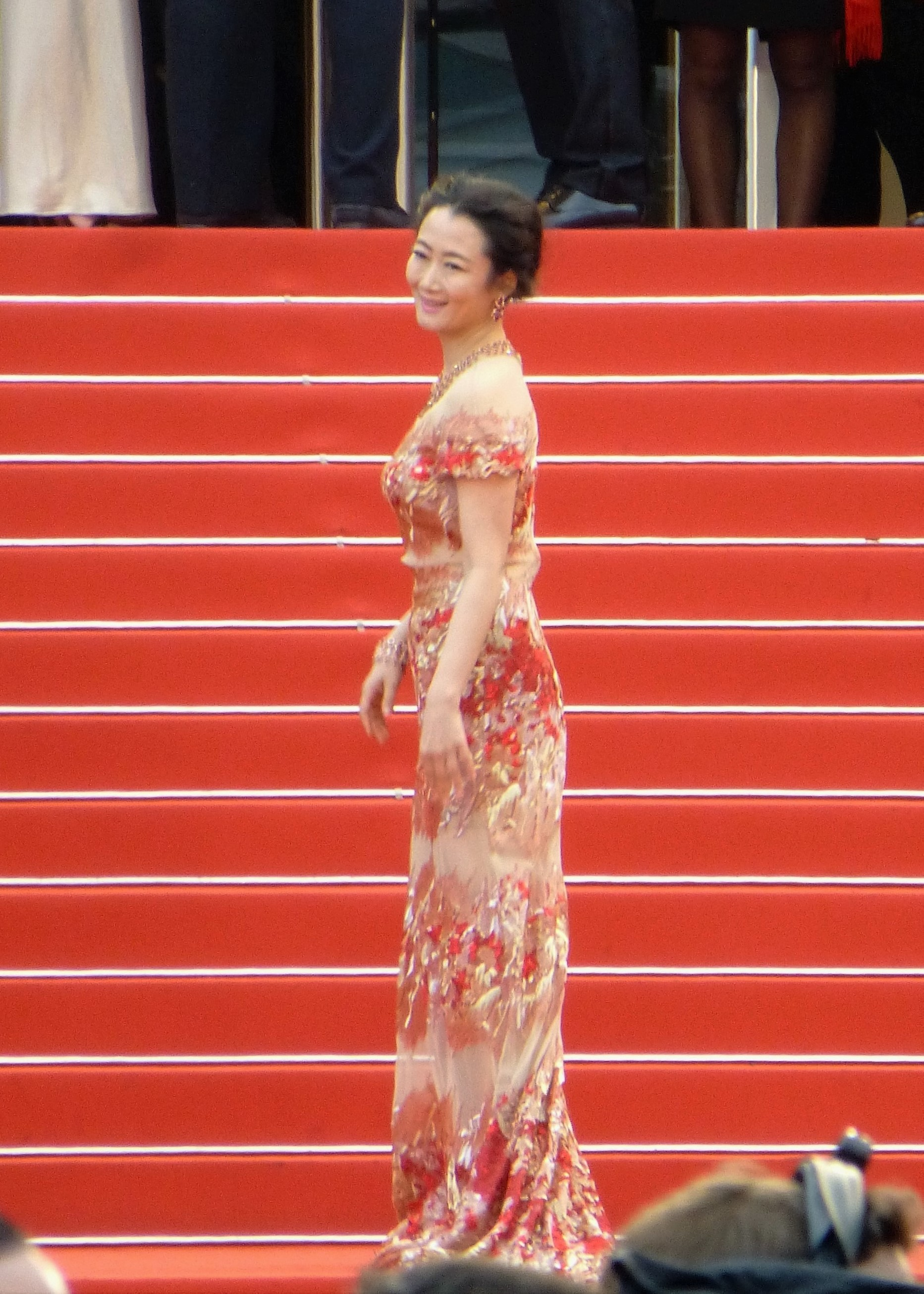
Zhao at 2016 Cannes Film Festival

== Personal life ==
On 7 January 2012, Zhao married director Jia Zhangke.

== Complete filmography ==
Year	English Title	Chinese Title	Role	Notes
2000	Platform	站台	Yin Ruijuan	Ensemble
2002	Unknown Pleasures	任逍遥	Qiao Qiao	Lead
2004	The World	世界	Tao	Lead
2006	Still Life	三峡好人	Shen Hong	Lead
2007	Our Ten Years	我们的十年		Lead
2008	24 City	二十四城记	Su Na	Ensemble
2008	Dada's Dance	达达		Ensemble
2008	Cry Me a River	河上的愛情	Zhou Qi	Lead
2009	Remembrance	念石	-	Lead
2010	Ten Thousand Waves	-	Blue Goddess	Ensemble
2011	Shun Li and the Poet	我是丽	Shun Li	Lead
2013	A Touch of Sin	天注定	Xiao Yu	Ensemble
2015	Mountains May Depart	山河故人	Shen Tao	Nominated - 52nd Golden Horse Award for Best Leading Actress
2018	Ash Is Purest White	江湖兒女	Zhao Qiao	Nominated - 55th Golden Horse Award for Best Leading Actress; Silver Hugo Award for Best Actress; Asia Pacific Screen Award for Best Performance by an Actress
2024	Caught by the Tides	风流一代	Qiao Qiao	Lead
