= Fenyang =

Fenyang 汾阳市
- County-level city
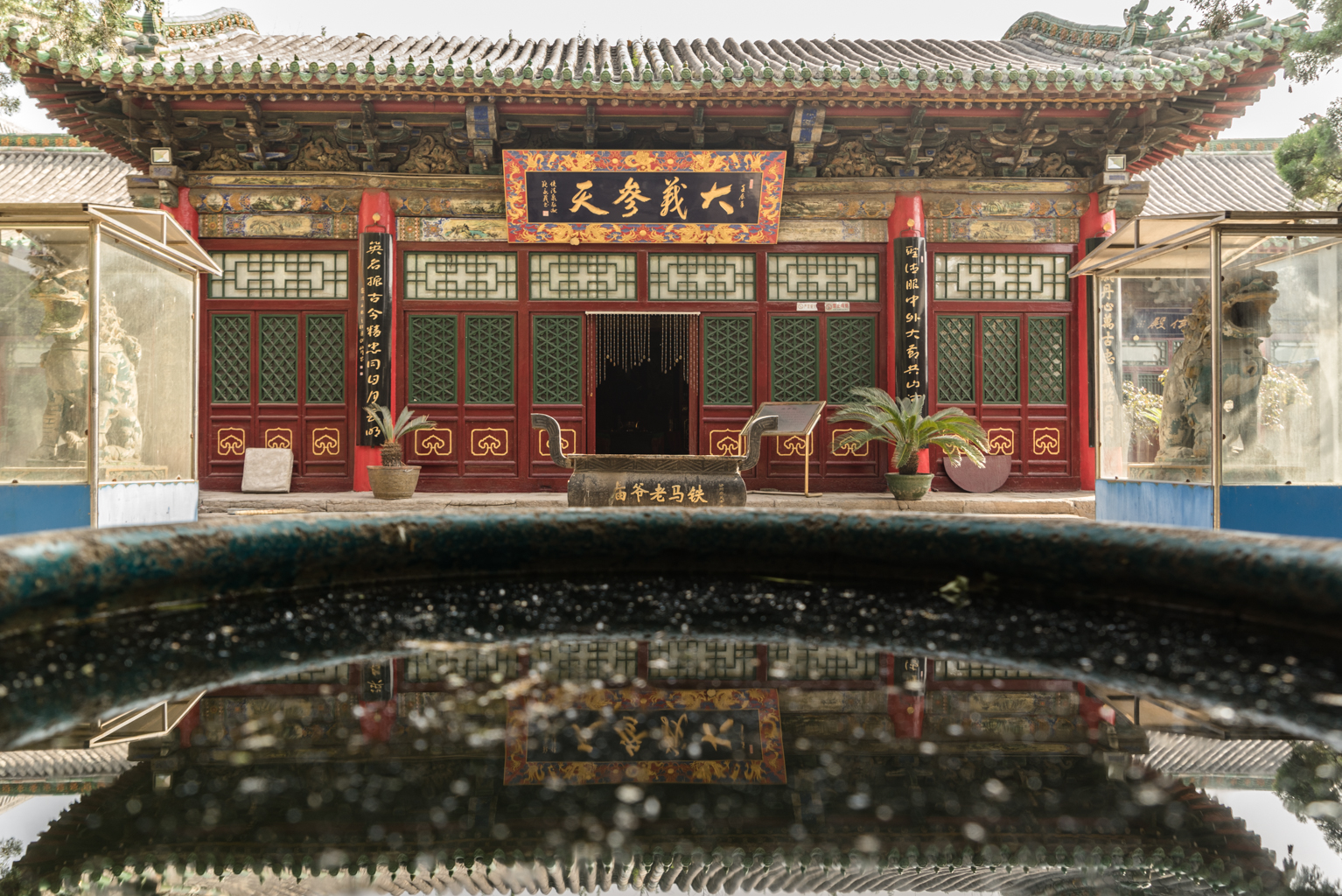
- Temple of Guan Yu

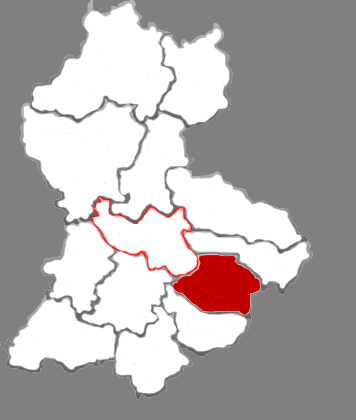
- Fenyang in Lüliang

- Location in Shanxi
- Coordinates: 37°15′42″N 111°46′12″E
- Country: People's Republic of China
- Province: Shanxi
- Prefecture-level city: Lüliang

Area
  - County-level city: 1,175.3 km^{2} (453.8 sq mi)
  - Urban: 20.00 km^{2} (7.72 sq mi)

Population (2017)
  - County-level city: 446,000
  - Density: 379/km^{2} (983/sq mi)
  - Urban: 121,600
- Time zone: UTC+8 (China Standard)

Fenyang (simplified Chinese: 汾阳市; traditional Chinese: 汾陽市; pinyin: Fényáng Shì), formerly as Fenyang County (汾阳县) before 1996, is a county-level city under the administration of Lüliang prefecture-level city, in Shanxi Province, China.

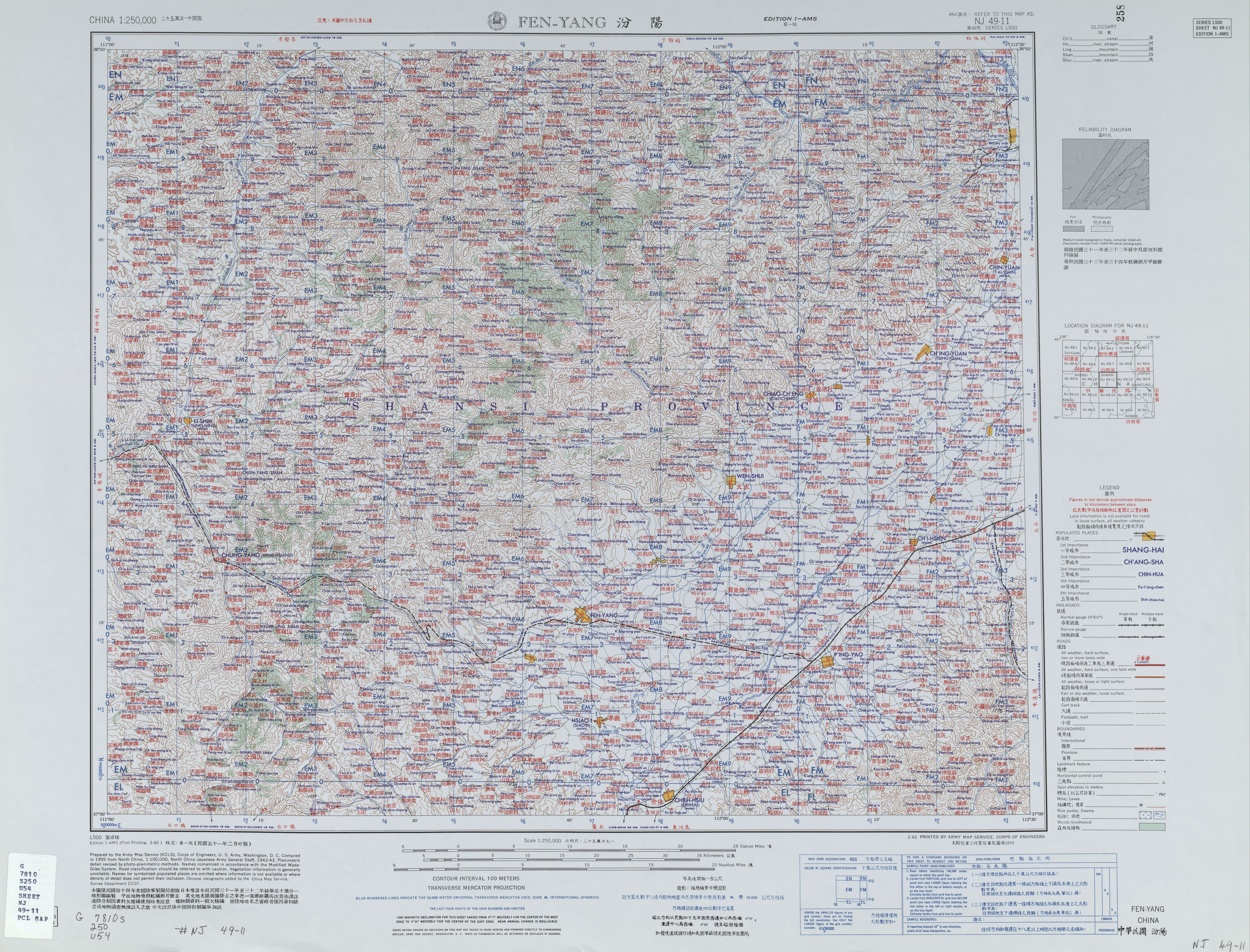
Map including Fenyang (labeled as 汾陽 FEN-YANG (walled)) (AMS, 1955)

Fenyang is located in the wide valley of the Fen River, some 20-plus kilometers west of the actual river.

Fenyang was the birthplace of Jia Zhangke, who filmed 1997 Xiao Wu there. Platform is set from the end of the 1970s to the beginning of the 1990s in and around Fenyang. Subsequently, Mountains May Depart features scenes set in Fenyang in 1999 and 2014. Fengyang is also the birthplace of Guo Qinglan (郭庆兰; Guō Qìnglán), the widow of Dwarkanath Kotnis.

Fenyang has a strong reputation within Shanxi for the production of Fenjiu (汾酒; fénjiǔ), a type of Baijiu known for its superior flavor.

== History ==
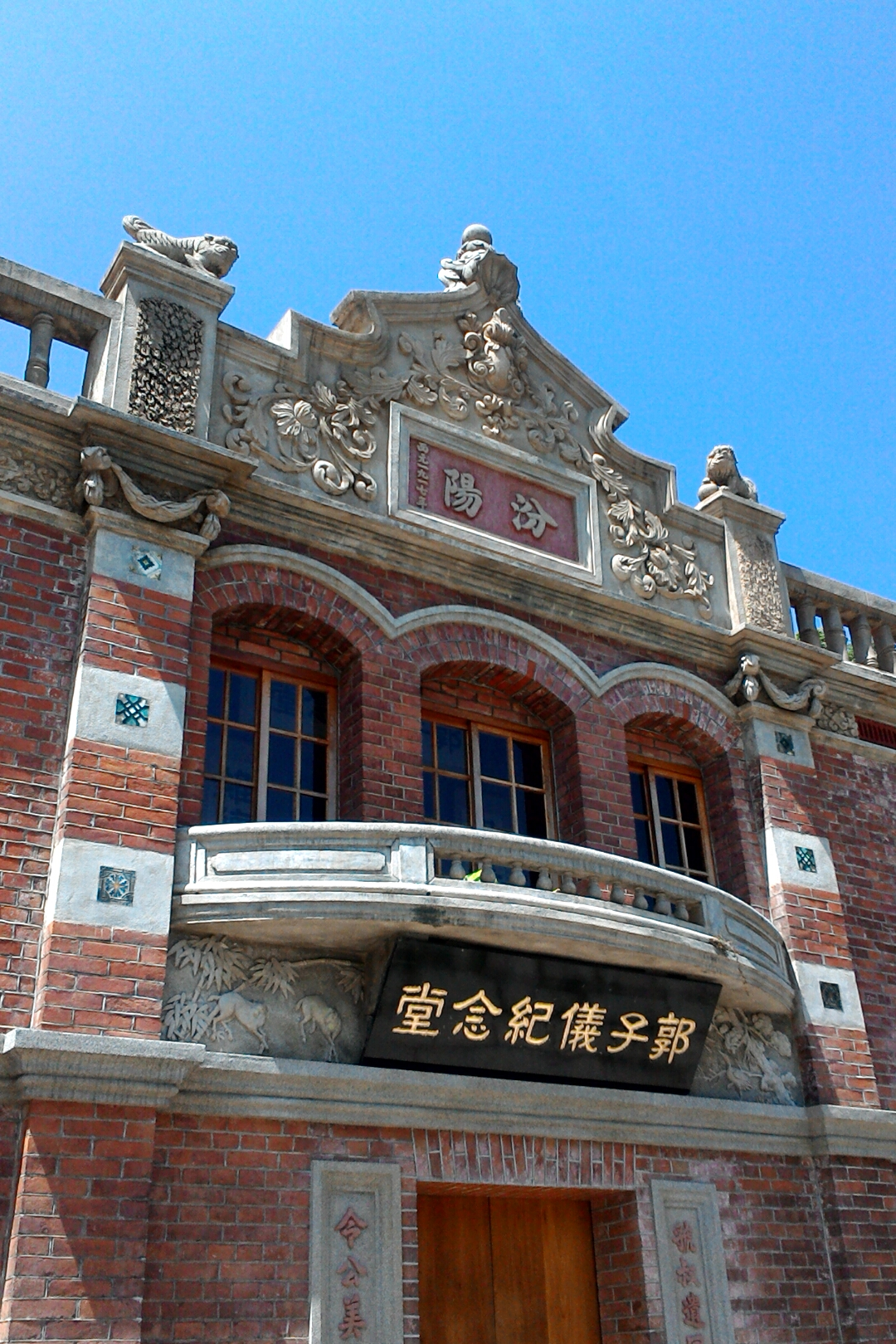
The Guo Family Ancestral House in Neihu, with "Fenyang" inscribed on its gable.

During the Qin dynasty, the area was established as Zishi County. In the Western Jin dynasty, its name was changed to Xicheng County. In the first year of the Shangyuan era during the Tang dynasty (760 CE), it was renamed once again to Xihe County. In the first year of the Hongwu reign during the Ming dynasty (1368 CE), it was merged into Fenzhou. Later, in the 23rd year of the Wanli reign (1595 CE), it was elevated to Fenzhou Prefecture and Fenyang County was established. During the early Republic of China era, prefectures were abolished, and the county was retained. In 1996, the county was restructured into a county-level city.

== Climate ==
Climate data for Fenyang, elevation 748 m (2,454 ft), (1991–2020 normals, extremes 1981–present)
Month	Jan	Feb	Mar	Apr	May	Jun	Jul	Aug	Sep	Oct	Nov	Dec	Year
Record high °C (°F)	14.8 (58.6)	21.9 (71.4)	29.7 (85.5)	37.6 (99.7)	38.7 (101.7)	40.2 (104.4)	39.1 (102.4)	36.9 (98.4)	37.6 (99.7)	29.8 (85.6)	24.5 (76.1)	17.8 (64.0)	40.2 (104.4)
Mean daily maximum °C (°F)	2.8 (37.0)	7.2 (45.0)	14.7 (58.5)	21.3 (70.3)	27.1 (80.8)	30.6 (87.1)	30.9 (87.6)	29.1 (84.4)	24.4 (75.9)	18.9 (66.0)	11.0 (51.8)	3.9 (39.0)	18.5 (65.3)
Daily mean °C (°F)	−4.5 (23.9)	−0.4 (31.3)	6.8 (44.2)	13.7 (56.7)	19.7 (67.5)	23.4 (74.1)	24.7 (76.5)	22.8 (73.0)	17.4 (63.3)	11.2 (52.2)	3.9 (39.0)	−2.6 (27.3)	11.3 (52.4)
Mean daily minimum °C (°F)	−10.4 (13.3)	−6.5 (20.3)	−0.4 (31.3)	5.7 (42.3)	11.7 (53.1)	16.1 (61.0)	19.1 (66.4)	17.5 (63.5)	11.6 (52.9)	5.1 (41.2)	−1.7 (28.9)	−7.8 (18.0)	5.0 (41.0)
Record low °C (°F)	−24.7 (−12.5)	−25.0 (−13.0)	−14.3 (6.3)	−7.8 (18.0)	−1.9 (28.6)	5.5 (41.9)	9.8 (49.6)	6.9 (44.4)	−1.8 (28.8)	−8.8 (16.2)	−21.8 (−7.2)	−24.9 (−12.8)	−25.0 (−13.0)
Average precipitation mm (inches)	3.2 (0.13)	5.2 (0.20)	9.4 (0.37)	25.0 (0.98)	28.6 (1.13)	45.7 (1.80)	93.8 (3.69)	94.7 (3.73)	65.5 (2.58)	32.6 (1.28)	12.3 (0.48)	2.6 (0.10)	418.6 (16.47)
Average precipitation days (≥ 0.1 mm)	2.1	2.7	3.5	5.6	6.5	8.9	11.4	10.6	8.6	6.5	3.8	1.5	71.7
Average snowy days	2.9	3.2	2.1	0.4	0	0	0	0	0	0	1.8	2.5	12.9
Average relative humidity (%)	51	48	44	44	46	55	69	75	75	68	59	51	57
Mean monthly sunshine hours	151.7	164.6	210.9	240.3	260.7	231.0	216.5	201.4	180.9	184.7	156.2	153.9	2,352.8
Percentage possible sunshine	49	53	56	61	59	53	49	48	49	54	52	52	53
Source: China Meteorological Administration all-time extreme temperature

== Geography ==
Fenyang is located on the eastern foothills of the Lvliang Mountains, featuring a terrain that combines both hills and plains. The Wenyu River, a tributary of the Fen River, flows through the region. The city has an average annual temperature of 9°C and receives about 470 millimeters of precipitation per year.

== Administrative divisions ==
Fenyang administers 2 subdistricts, 9 towns, and 3 townships.

The administrative divisions are:

- Subdistricts:
  - Jiefang Subdistrict (解放街道)
  - Xinhua Subdistrict (新华街道)
- Towns:
  - Wangzhuang (王庄镇)
  - Qingyao (青尧镇)
  - Wangfen (王村镇)
  - Baima (白马镇)
  - Liugang (柳岗镇)
  - Dayi (大义镇)
  - Nanyao (南窑镇)
  - Songlou (宋楼镇)
  - Xiangyang (向阳镇)
- Townships:
  - Wulu Township (乌鹊乡)
  - Baizhao Township (白召乡)
  - Hancun Township (韩村乡)

== Economy ==
Agriculture in Fenyang primarily involves the cultivation of wheat, sorghum, rice, and cotton, with walnuts as a notable local specialty. The city's industrial base includes food-processing and coal mining.

Baijiu (Chinese white liquor) is the leading industry in the region. In 2022, Fenyang's baijiu industry generated an output value of 20.15 billion yuan with a production volume of 177,000 kiloliters, accounting for four-fifths of Shanxi Province's total and one-fifth of the national Qingxiang (light aroma) baijiu output. The dominant enterprise is the Fenjiu Group, which alone contributes approximately 70% of the city's production and 96% of its baijiu output value.

== Natural Resources ==
- Minerals: Fenyang has rich mineral resources, including coal, gypsum, bauxite, iron, limestone, quartzite, and potash feldspar.
- Wildlife: The region is home to various wild animals such as musk deer, leopards, foxes, roe deer, wild boars, pheasants, rock partridges, and brown-eared pheasants.
- Wild Medicinal Plants: The area supports the growth of Chinese traditional medicinal herbs such as poria, codonopsis, licorice (Glycyrrhiza uralensis), Scutellaria baicalensis, and bupleurum.
- Local Specialties: Major local products include:
  - Fenjiu (a renowned type of light aroma baijiu)
  - Bamboo Leaf Green Liquor (Zhuyeqing)
  - Fenzhou walnuts
  - Chinese yam (Dioscorea polystachya)

== Transportation ==
- G20 Qingdao–Yinchuan Expressway
- Taiyuan-Zhongwei-Yinchuan Railway
