= Xstream Pictures =

Chinese company

- Company type: Production company
- Industry: Chinese cinema Hong Kong Cinema
- Founded: 2003
- Headquarters: Beijing/Hong Kong, China
- Key people: Jia Zhangke; Yu Lik-wai; Chow Keung

Xstream Pictures is a Chinese production company, based out of Beijing and Hong Kong.

== Company Founders ==
It was founded by filmmakers Jia Zhangke, Chow Keung, and Yu Lik-wai.

== Company History ==
Formed in 2003, the company's first production was Jia's own The World.

It has since served as a production house for several of Jia's other films, as well as Yu Lik-wai's Plastic City.

== List of productions ==
- 2004 - The World (dir. Jia Zhangke)
- 2006 - Walking on the Wild Side (dir. Han Jie)
- 2006 - Still Life (dir. Jia Zhangke)
- 2006 - Dong (dir. Jia Zhangke)
- 2007 - Useless (dir. Jia Zhangke)
- 2008 - Plastic City (dir. Yu Lik-wai)
- 2008 - 24 City (dir. Jia Zhangke)
- 2008 - Perfect Life (dir. Emily Tang)
- 2013 - Forgetting to Know You (dir. Quan Ling)
- 2015 - Mountains May Depart (dir. Jia Zhangke)
- 200x - Age of Tattoo (dir. Jia Zhangke) (in production)
