= Xiao Wu =

- Theatrical release poster
- Chinese: 小武
- Hanyu Pinyin: Xiǎo Wǔ
- Directed by: Jia Zhangke
- Written by: Jia Zhangke
- Produced by: Li Kit Ming; Jia Zhangke
- Starring: Wang Hongwei; Hao Hongjian
- Cinematography: Nelson Yu Lik-wai
- Edited by: Yu Xiaoling
- Distributed by: Hu Tong Communications
- Release dates: Berlin: February 18, 1998
- Running time: 111 minutes
- Country: China
- Languages: Jin; Mandarin

Xiao Wu (Chinese: 小武), also known as Pickpocket, is a 1998 Chinese drama and the first directed by Jia Zhangke. Starring Wang Hongwei in the title role along with Hao Hongjian and Zuo Baitao, it was filmed in Fenyang, Jia's hometown, in 16 mm. Following its release, the film received critical acclaim and won the Wolfgang Staudte Award at the Forum section of the 48th Berlin International Film Festival.

== Plot ==
In the small provincial town of Fenyang in 1997, Xiao Wu roams the streets as a pickpocket amid a major anti-crime campaign. Most of his associates have moved on to become legitimate or semi-legitimate. A former partner and close friend, Xiaoyong, who has established himself as a successful entrepreneur trafficking in wholesale cigarettes and operating karaoke bars, chooses not to invite Xiao Wu to his wedding in an attempt to distance himself from his criminal past.

Xiao Wu drifts around, discontent with life yet unable to change. He courts a bargirl, Meimei, who takes a liking to him and asks him to buy a pager so that they can stay in touch. As the two grow closer, Xiao Wu buys a ring for Meimei, only to later find out that she has run off with someone wealthier. He then goes back to his poor peasant family and gives the ring to his mother, but when his future sister-in-law visits, he realizes that the ring has in turn been gifted to her. After a heated argument, Xiao Wu's father expels him from the family home, and he promises to never return.

Xiao Wu is finally caught during a pickpocket attempt when his pager sounds off and gives him away. At the police station, the friendly police chief uncuffs him and allows him to watch the news, which reports his arrest and features interviews where a former associate condemns him. The next day, while being transported, he is briefly left handcuffed to the side of the road, as a crowd congregates and watches him with disapproval and mockery.

== Production history ==
While a student in the mid-1990s, Jia Zhangke remained a relative unknown at China's prestigious Beijing Film Academy. While still in school, Jia directed the short film Xiao Shan Going Home, which he was eventually able to screen abroad, winning the top prize at the 1997 Hong Kong Independent Short Film & Video Awards. This success brought Jia into contact with cinematographer Yu Lik-wai and producer Li Kit Ming. With their support, Jia was able to begin work on Xiao Wu, which would become his first feature film. Xiao Wu was shot on a mere 400,000 RMB budget (or about $50,000 US).

=== Casting ===
Most of the supporting actors in the film were local residents. In Fenyang dialect, filming is called "playing" movies, implying that making films is seen as a fun game — and the locals were very willing to help with this "play." However, before filming began, several important roles had not been finalized. Jia Zhangke said he was confident. One night, his two childhood best friends came to him to "play," and he introduced them as the film's second and third male leads. Thus, Hao Hongjian, a prison guard, became Jin Xiaoyong, the nouveau riche in Xiao Wu, and An Qunyan, a staff member of the Construction Bank, later played the owner of a pharmacy. Jia said this was part of his original design — his characters were meant to be ordinary people from daily life. Hao Hongjian’s role as a police officer symbolized the “power” admired by locals, embodying a confident pride akin to that of the nouveau riche. An Qunyan was already a well-off middle-class resident locally, making him well suited to play the pharmacy owner.

=== Filming ===
The film was shot in Jia Zhangke’s hometown, the small county town of Fenyang in Shanxi. Most of the supporting actors were locals, and the dialogue was in the Jin dialect of Fenyang. The lead actor Wang Hongwei, playing Xiao Wu, is from Henan and used the Anyang dialect of Henan in the film.

=== Music ===
The following tracks appear in the soundtrack of Xiao Wu:

- "Farewell My Concubine"

Lyrics: Chen Tao

Composer: Feng Xiaoqian

Performer: Tu Honggang

- "Choice"

Lyrics: Chen Dali, Chen Xiunan

Composer: Chen Dali

- "Heart Rain"

Lyrics: Liu Zhenmei

Composer: Ma Zhaojun

Performers: Yang Yuying, Mao Ning

- "Beautiful Girl, Beautiful and Free"

Lyrics: Ma Jinping

Composer: Yang Bosen

- "Lightly Drunk for Life"

Lyrics: Tang Shuchen

Composer: Lu Guanting

Performer: Sally Yeh

- "Sky"

Lyrics: Huang Guilan

Composer: Yang Minghuang

- "Love the Country More Than the Beauty"

Lyrics/Composer: Xiao Chong

Performer: Li Lifen

- "Ninety-Nine Daughter’s Red"

Lyrics/Composer: Chen Xiaoqi

Performer: Chen Shaohua

== Release ==
The film premiered on February 18, 1998, at the Berlin International Film Festival. It was subsequently screened in Singapore (May 2, 1998), France (January 13, 1999), Argentina (April 3, 1999), Belgium (June 17, 1999), South Korea (October 2, 1999), Taiwan (November 18, 1999), the United Kingdom (February 11, 2000), and the Republic of Serbia (March 1, 2007).

== Reception ==
In a retrospective review for The New York Times, J. Hoberman notes that "Observational, mainly in medium shot and almost plotless, Xiao Wu has a documentary quality."

Xiao Wu was praised by the American filmmaker Martin Scorsese, a noted fan of Jia's works.

As Jia Zhangke’s first feature film, Xiao Wu is set in his familiar hometown, where audiences witness the lives of marginalized people facing a rapidly changing society. His observations on contemporary social culture are evident in this film.

Xiao Wu carries echoes of early Hou Hsiao-hsien films, featuring extensive use of voice-over, ambient sound, non-professional actors, and minimal editing.

=== Awards and nominations ===
- Berlin International Film Festival, Forum section, 1997
  - NETPAC Award
  - Wolfgang Staudte Award
- Buenos Aires International Festival of Independent Cinema, 1999
  - Official selection
- Nantes Three Continents Festival, 1998
  - Golden Montgolfiere (Tied with Wandâfuru raifu)
- Pusan International Film Festival, 1998
  - New Currents Award
- San Francisco International Film Festival, 1999
  - SKYY Prize
- Vancouver International Film Festival 1998
  - Dragons and Tigers Award

== Miscellaneous ==
- Lin Xiaoling, a sound engineer from the August First Film Studio of the People's Liberation Army, typically disliked wearing her military uniform. However, for the filming of Xiao Wu, director Jia Zhangke insisted that she wear her civilian officer attire to Shanxi, believing it would convey a sense of authority.
- The final version of the script initially bore a much longer title: Jin Xiaoyong’s Buddy, Hu Meimei’s Sugar Daddy, Liang Changyou’s Son: Xiao Wu. However, assistant director Zhang Xi felt that the character Xiao Wu lacked a spirit of resistance—despite being a petty thief and thus an inherent disruptor of social order, he remained passive in the face of repeated losses in friendship, love, and family. The title was therefore shortened to simply Xiao Wu.
- The character Xiao Wu, still played by Wang Hongwei, reappears in Jia Zhangke’s 2002 film Unknown Pleasures. In this film, Xiao Wu has become a relatively successful pickpocket in the city of Datong, Shanxi, and lends money to the character Bin Bin.
