= Platform (2000 film) =

- Film poster

Chinese name
- Traditional Chinese: 站台
- Simplified Chinese: 站台
- Literal meaning: Railway platform
Transcriptions
Standard Mandarin
- Hanyu Pinyin: Zhàntái
- Directed by: Jia Zhangke
- Written by: Jia Zhangke
- Produced by: Kit Ming Li; Shozo Ichiyama
- Starring: Wang Hongwei; Zhao Tao; Liang Jingdong; Yang Tianyi
- Cinematography: Yu Lik-wai
- Edited by: Kong Jinglei
- Music by: Yoshihiro Hanno
- Release date: September 4, 2000 (Venice)
- Running time: 154 minutes 193 minutes (director's cut)
- Country: China
- Language: Mandarin

Platform is a 2000 Chinese film written and directed by Jia Zhangke. The film is set in and around the small city of Fenyang, Shanxi province, China (Jia's birthplace), from the end of the 1970s to the beginning of the 1990s. It follows a group of twenty-something performers as they face personal and societal changes. The dialogue is a mixture of local speech, mainly Jin Chinese and Mandarin. The film has been called "an epic of grassroots". It is named after a popular song about waiting at a railway platform.

Platform has garnered wide acclaim from critics in the years since its release, and is often named one of the greatest films of the 2000s. The film has been called the masterpiece of the entire "Sixth Generation" movement of Chinese cinema, although the movie has never been publicly released in China due to its being made outside of official state approval.

== Plot ==
The film starts in 1979 in the wake of the Cultural Revolution. A performance troupe of young adults in Fenyang performs state-approved material. Four troupe members are introduced - Cui Mingliang, Yin Ruijuan, Zhang Jun and his girlfriend Zhong Ping. The rebellious Cui clashes with his family and elders, and envies Zhang, whose visits to his aunt in Guangzhou allow him to procure consumer goods in the wake of China's reform and opening up. Cui is interested in Yin, whose military official father disapproves of him. Zhang successfully pressures Zhong to perm her hair; Zhong tries to interest the more conservative Yin in the latest fashions, but she resists. Zhang accidentally gets Zhong pregnant and forces her to get an abortion, straining their relationship. Cui continues to pursue Yin, who only gives him noncommittal answers, frustrating him. Eventually, she rejects him, telling him that she feels that they are incompatible.

The troupe begins to bend to Western influences and is eventually privatized. Cui, heartbroken and filled with wanderlust, remains with the troupe as they go on tour under new management, as do Zhang and Zhong; Yin chooses to stay behind. They witness massive changes sweeping the nation - electricity is introduced to a rural village; there, they encounter Sanming, Cui's uneducated peasant cousin, whose sister Wenying is staying with Cui's family. Out of desperation, Sanming takes a poorly-paid job at an unregulated coal mine for Wenying to afford an increasingly expensive university education. Before the troupe leaves, Sanming hands a meager five yuan to Cui, instructing him to give it to Wenying and to tell her to never return. Along the way, their truck gets stuck in mud, and the troupe sees a train passing by for the first time.

Zhang and Zhong continue their relationship on the road; Cui continues to pine for Yin, but avoids contacting her. Zhang and Zhong's illegal out-of-wedlock relationship is discovered by the authorities under interrogation. They return to Fenyang; Cui hands over ten yuan to Wenying, who becomes upset about her brother's lack of prospects, while Zhong cuts off contact from Zhang and the rest of the troupe. The troupe rebrands themselves as a rock music troupe from Shenzhen and goes on tour again. Cui begins a relationship with a new troupe member. They struggle to land permits for shows and are reduced to performing on the side of highways, travelling as far as Inner Mongolia before turning back.

Eventually, Cui and the troupe return to Fenyang once more. Cui's parents' marriage has fallen apart, with his father having remarried and opened a shop. He, Zhang, and Yao Eryong, another troupe member, leave the troupe and go into business dealing in construction materials. They run into Yin again, now a tax collector, who has been secretly pining for her days of performing. Despite still stinging from the pain of rejection, Cui visits Yin and they reconnect. The film ends with Cui and Yin, now married with a son, as a train's whistle blows over the credits.

== Cast ==
- Wang Hongwei as Cui Mingliang
- Zhao Tao as Yin Ruijuan
- Liang Jingdong as Zhang Jun
- Yang Tianyi as Zhong Ping
- Wang Bo as Yao Eryong
- Han Sanming as Sanming

== Critical reception ==
Platform was voted the second best film of the decade by the Toronto International Film Festival (TIFF)'s Cinematheque, by more than 60 film experts (historians, archivists, etc.) from around the world. Another film by Jia Zhangke, Still Life, was voted the third best film. Platform placed 32 on Slant Magazine's list of the 100 best films of the 2000s and was named as one of Sight & Sound's films of the 2000s. Platform was ranked the 11th best film of the decade in an international poll conducted by Film Comment. In 2016, film critics from the Austrian Film Museum, Der Standard and Le Monde included Platform in their top 10 films of the 21st century.

On the review aggregator website Rotten Tomatoes, 80% of 20 critics' reviews are positive, with an average rating of 6.7/10. On Metacritic, the film has a score of 76 based on 7 critic reviews.

=== Awards ===
- Venice Film Festival, 2000
  - Netpac Award
- Three Continents Festival, 2000
  - Golden Montgolfiere
- Singapore International Film Festival, 2000
  - SFC Young Cinema Award
- Buenos Aires International Festival of Independent Cinema, 2001
  - Best Film
- Fribourg International Film Festival, 2001
  - Don Quixote Award
  - FIPRESCI Prize
