= 24 City =

2008 Chinese film by Jia Zhangke

- Cannes Film Festival poster
- Traditional Chinese: 二十四城記
- Simplified Chinese: 二十四城记
- Literal meaning: story of twenty-four city
- Hanyu Pinyin: èrshísì chéng jì
- Directed by: Jia Zhangke
- Written by: Jia Zhangke; Zhai Yongming
- Produced by: Jia Zhangke; Shozo Ichiyama; Wang Hong
- Starring: Joan Chen; Lü Liping; Zhao Tao; Chen Jianbin
- Cinematography: Yu Lik-wai; Wang Yu
- Edited by: Lin Xudong; Kong Jinglei
- Music by: Yoshihiro Hanno; Lim Giong
- Distributed by: MK2 Diffusion
- Release dates: May 17, 2008 (Cannes); March 6, 2009 (China)
- Running time: 107 minutes
- Country: China
- Languages: Mandarin; Sichuanese; Shanghainese
- Box office: $396,044

24 City (Chinese: 二十四城记) is a 2008 Chinese documentary, or docufiction, film directed and co-written by Jia Zhangke. The film follows three generations of residents of Chengdu in the 1950s, the 1970s and the present, as a state-owned factory gives way to a modern apartment complex. It was also called The Story of 24 City during production.

== Production ==
The apartment complex, called "24 City”, is real place and was the location for shooting the film. It was built on the site of a fighter jet engine factory where some of the people interviewed once worked.

The film's narrative style is described by critics as a blend of fictive and documentary story-telling, and it consists of authentic interviews and fictive scenes delivered by actors but presented in a documentary format.

== Release ==
24 City made its debut shown in competition for the Palme d'Or at the 2008 Cannes Film Festival. Film Comment, the official journal of the Film Society of Lincoln Center, listed the film at the end of 2008 as the second-best unreleased (without U.S. theatrical release) film of the year.

=== Reception ===
On Rotten Tomatoes, the film holds an 89% approval rating based on 45 reviews, with an average score of 7.4/10. The consensus reads, "One of China's most talented directors blurs the lines between non-fiction, drama, and musical theater in this vivid portrait of a country in cultural flux." On Metacritic, the film has an average score of 75 out of 100, based on 11 reviews, indicating "generally favorable reviews".

The Hollywood Reporter called the film a "moving elegy to modern-day China" and said the film's quasi-documentary style "prevails to simple, yet emotionally reverberating effect".

Time also reviewed the film favorably, saying, "the film interweaves the political overview — of a city institution being torn down to be replaced by commercial and residential buildings — with personal anecdotes that are poignant and charming."

Screen International said "the latest chapter in Jia Zhangke's chronicles of modern Chinese history is certain to reinforce the director's status as an international arthouse icon."

The New York Times film critic Manohla Dargis said "...the often amazing and intricately structured '24 City,' the latest from the Chinese director Jia Zhang-ke...shot in digital so sharp it looks hyper-real and projected digitally, the movie takes as its point of departure the closing of a state-owned munitions factory in southwest China... Mr. Jia is one of the most original filmmakers working today, creating movies about a country that seems like a sequel."

Anthony Kaufman of IndieWire praised the film and states "Jia's masterful aesthetic remains consistent, mixing documentary and fiction with intriguing results."

J. Hoberman of the Village Voice described the film as "so meaningfully framed that it could have been shot by Andy Warhol or Chantal Akerman", and called the film as one of the stand-outs of this year's films in competition at the Cannes Film Festival.
