= List of Chinese films of 2008 =

The following is a list of mainland Chinese films first released in year 2008. There were 80 Chinese feature films released in China in 2008.

== Box office ==
The following are the 10 highest-grossing Chinese films released in China in 2008.

Rank	Title	Gross (in million yuan)
1	Red Cliff	¥276.860
2	If You Are the One	¥250.793
3	Painted Skin	¥204.708
4	The Forbidden Kingdom	¥145.637
5	Forever Enthralled	¥101.691
6	Kung Fu Dunk	¥95.826
7	Ip Man	¥82.773
8	Three Kingdoms: Resurrection of the Dragon	¥63.635
9	Shi Quan Jiu Mei	¥48.842
10	Connected	¥44.413

== Films released ==
Title	Director	Cast	Genre	Notes
24 City	Jia Zhangke	Joan Chen, Zhao Tao, Lü Liping	Drama	
All About Women	Tsui Hark	Zhou Xun, Kitty Zhang, Gwei Lun-mei	Romantic comedy	
Bird's Nest	Ning Jingwu		Family	
CJ7	Stephen Chow	Stephen Chow, Xu Jiao, Kitty Zhang, Lam Tze Chung	Comedy	
Crude Oil	Wang Bing		Documentary	
Cry Me a River	Jia Zhangke	Zhao Tao, Wang Hongwei	Short/Romance	
Dada's Dance	Zhang Yuan	Li Xinyun; Li Xiaofeng	Drama	
Deadly Delicious	Zhao Tianyu	Francis Ng, Yu Nan, Jiang Yiyan	Thriller	
Desires of the Heart	Ma Liwen	Ge You, Vivian Wu, Fan Bingbing	Romantic comedy	
Dream Weavers: Beijing 2008	Gu Jun		Documentary	China's official 2008 foreign-language film Oscar submission
The End of Year	Wang Jing	Cheng Gang, Zhang Tong	Drama/Comedy	
Endless Night	Pan Jianlin	Guan Na	Docudrama	
The Equation of Love and Death	Cao Baoping	Zhou Xun	Romance	
The Children of Huang Shi	Roger Spottiswoode	Jonathan Rhys Meyers	Drama	
Er Dong	Yang Jin	Bai Lijun	Drama	
Esquire Runaway	Qiao Liang	Alex Fong Lik-Sun	Comedy	
Fit Lover	Zhang Jianya	Karena Lam	Romantic comedy	
Forever Enthralled	Chen Kaige	Leon Lai, Zhang Ziyi	Biographical	
Good Cats	Ying Liang		Drama	
If You Are the One	Feng Xiaogang	Ge You, Shu Qi	Romantic comedy	
In Love We Trust	Wang Xiaoshuai	Liu Weiwei, Zhang Jiayi, Yu Nan	Drama	Formerly titled Left Right
Jalainur	Zhao Ye	Liu Yuansheng, Li Zhihong	Drama	
Knitting	Yin Lichuan	Zhang Yi, Yan Bingyan, Lu Yulai	Drama	
Kung Fu Hip Hop	Fu Huayang	Fan Bingbing, Jordan Chan	Musical/Youth	
Lala's Gun	Ning Jingwu	Wang Jishuai	Drama	
Letters from Death Row	Keven Feng Ke	Di Yueming	Drama	
Li Shuangliang	Huo Jianqi	Wang Qingxiang, Guo Xiaodong, Dong Jie	Drama/Biographical	
Lost and Found	Ma Liwen	Li Yixiang	Black comedy	
Lost Indulgence	Zhang Yibai	Jiang Wenli, Karen Mok	Drama	
My Left Hand	Chen Guoxing	Ma Yue, Xu Jun	War	
Ocean Flame	Liu Fendou	Monica Mok, Liao Fan	Drama	
Old Fish	Gao Qunshu	Ma Guowei	Thriller/Drama	Jury Grand Prix at the 2008 Shanghai International Film Festival
The One Man Olympics	Hou Yong	Li Zhaolin	Sports/Biographical	
Painted Skin	Gordon Chan	Donnie Yen, Chen Kun, Zhao Wei	Horror	Hong Kong-Chinese co-production
Perfect Life	Emily Tang		Drama	
Queer China	Cui Zi'en		Documentary	
Red Cliff: Episode 1	John Woo	Tony Leung Chiu-Wai, Takeshi Kaneshiro, Zhang Fengyi	Historical epic	
River People	He Jianjun	Shan Jingqin	Drama	
Shi Qi	Ji Chen	Joan Chen, Sam Chow	Drama	
Storm Rider Clash of the Evils	Dante Lam		Animated	
Super Typhoon	Feng Xiaoning	Wu Gang	Disaster	
Two Stupid Eggs	Kiefer Liu	Guo Tao	Comedy	
Winter Story	Zhu Chuanming	Mao Mao, An Qi	Romance	

== See also ==
- List of Chinese films of 2007
- List of Chinese films of 2009
