= List of Chinese films of 2007 =

The following is a list of mainland Chinese films first released in year 2007. There were 74 Chinese feature films released in China in 2007.

== Films released ==
Title	Director	Cast	Genre	Notes
And the Spring Comes	Gu Changwei	Jiang Wenli	Drama	
Assembly	Feng Xiaogang	Zhang Hanyu	War	
Bamboo Shoots	Jian Yi		Drama	Bronze Zenith' winner of 31st Montreal World Film Festival and "D-Cinema Award" winner of the 10th Barcelona Asian Film Fest
Bingai	Feng Yan		Documentary	Awarded the Ogawa Shinsuke Prize at the 2007 Yamagata Documentary Film Festival
Blind Mountain	Li Yang	Huang Lu	Drama	
Blood Brothers	Alexi Tan	Liu Ye, Daniel Wu, Chang Chen, Shu Qi	Drama/Historical	
Call for Love	Zhang Jianya	Xu Zheng	Romantic comedy	
The Case	Wang Fen	Wu Gang, Wu Yujuan, Wang Sifei, Wang Hongwei	Drama	
Cherry	Zhang Jiabei	Miao Pu; Tuo Guoquan	Drama	
Crossed Lines	Liu Yiwei, Lin Jinhe	Fan Bingbing, Xu Fan	Comedy	
Crossing Over	Jin Chen	Kiichi Nakai, Miao Pu, Guo Tao	Romance	
Dangerous Games	Wang Guangli	Xia Yu	Comedy	
The Door	Li Shaohong	Chen Kun	Thriller	
The Dream is Alive	Zhang Jianya		Drama	
Fengming, a Chinese Memoir	Wang Bing	He Fengming	Documentary	
Fujian Blue	Weng Shouming		Drama	
Getting Home	Zhang Yang	Zhao Benshan	Black comedy	
How Is Your Fish Today?	Guo Xiaolu	Guo Xiaolu, Hao Ning	Drama	
Invisible Wings	Feng Zhenzhi	Lei Qingyao	Drama	
The Kite Runner	Marc Forster	Khalid Abdalla, Homayoun Ershadi, Shaun Toub, Atossa Leoni, Saïd Taghmaoui	Drama	
Little Moth	Peng Tao	Hong Qifa, Han Dequn, Zhao Huihu	Drama	
The Longest Night in Shanghai	Zhang Yibai	Zhao Wei, Masahiro Motoki	Romance	Chinese-Japanese co-production
Lost in Beijing	Li Yu	Fan Bingbing, Elaine Jin, Tony Leung Ka Fai, Tong Dawei	Drama	
Lust, Caution	Ang Lee	Tony Leung Chiu-Wai, Tang Wei, Joan Chen, Leehom Wang	Drama	Golden Lion winner of 2007
Ma Wu Jia	Zhao Ye		Drama	
The Matrimony	Teng Huatao	Fan Bingbing	Drama/Horror	
Mid-Afternoon Barks	Zhang Yuedong	Zhang Yuedong	Drama/Comedy	
Monkey King vs. Er Lang Shen
My Fair Son	Cui Zi'en	Yu Bo; Junrui Wang; Weiming Wang; Guifeng Wang; Ziqiang Li	LGBT-themed drama	
Night Train	Diao Yi'nan	Liu Dan, Qi Dao	Thriller	Grand Prix at the Warsaw International Film Festival
The Park	Yin Lichuan	Wang Deshun, Li Jia	Drama/Romance	FIPRESCI Prize at the 2007 International Filmfestival Mannheim-Heidelberg. Entered into the 29th Moscow International Film Festival.
PK.COM.CN	Xiao Jiang	Jaycee Chan, Wilson Chen, Niu Mengmeng, Law Kar-ying	Drama / Mystery / Suspense	
The Red Awn	Cai Shangjun	Yao Anlian, Lu Yulai	Drama	Golden Alexander winner at the 2007 International Thessaloniki Film Festival
Road to Dawn	Derek Chiu	Winston Chao	Historical	
The Secret of the Magic Gourd	John Chu		Animated/Family	
Sparkling Red Star	Dante Lam		Animated/War	
The Sun Also Rises	Jiang Wen	Jaycee Chan, Jiang Wen, Joan Chen, Anthony Wong	Drama	
Super, Girls!	Jian Yi		Documentary	27th Cambridge Film Festival; Museum of Modern Art, New York
Tuya's Marriage	Wang Quan'an	Yu Nan	Drama	Golden Bear winner of 2007
Umbrella	Du Haibin		Documentary	
Useless	Jia Zhangke	Ma Ke	Documentary	
The Warlords	Peter Chan	Jet Li, Takeshi Kaneshiro, Andy Lau	Historical/War	Hong Kong-Chinese co-production Golden Horse for Best Film - 2008 / Hong Kong Film Award for Best Film - 2008
The Western Trunk Line	Li Jixian		Drama	

== See also ==
- List of Chinese films of 2006
- List of Chinese films of 2008
