= List of Chinese films of 2009 =

The following is a list of mainland Chinese films first released in year 2009. There were 88 Chinese feature films released in China in 2009.

== Box office ==
The following are the 10 highest-grossing Chinese films released in China in 2009.

Rank	Title	Gross (in million yuan)
1	The Founding of a Republic	¥393.287
2	Bodyguards and Assassins	¥269.430
3	Red Cliff: Part II	¥243.540
4	A Simple Noodle Story	¥239.376
5	The Message	¥205.195
6	City of Life and Death	¥159.810
7	Look for a Star	¥108.135
8	Crazy Racer	¥104.959
9	On His Majesty's Secret Service	¥100.223
10	Sophie's Revenge	¥91.987

== Films released ==
Title	Director	Cast	Genre	Notes
Bodyguards and Assassins	Teddy Chen	Donnie Yen; Leon Lai; Nicholas Tse	Action/Drama/Historical	Hong Kong/China co-production Winner of the Hong Kong Film Award for Best Film
Chengdu, I Love You	Cui Jian, Fruit Chan	Gao Yuanyuan	Science-fiction/Drama	
China Idol Boys	Lin Huaquan		Musical	
City of Life and Death	Lu Chuan	Liu Ye, Gao Yuanyuan	War/Historical	
Cow	Guan Hu	Huang Bo, Yan Ni	Black Comedy	
Crazy Racer	Ning Hao	Huang Bo	Comedy	
Dance for Love	Wen Shuo, Du Wangping	Ai Yuhan	Drama	
Diago	Zhang Chi	Carl Wu	Drama	
Eagle Flute	Tao Jiang	Luoeryi Querjian, Danba Xiamu	Drama	
Empire of Silver	Christina Yao	Zhang Tielin, Aaron Kwok, Hao Lei	Historical/Drama	Hong Kong/China co-production
Eternal Beloved	Faye Yu	Faye Yu, Duan Yihong	Romance	
Evening of Roses	Ng See-Yuen	Ruby Lin	Romantic comedy	
Examination 1977	Jiang Haiyang	Wang Xuebing, Sun Haiying	Drama	
The Founding of a Republic	Huang Jianxin	Tang Guoqiang, Zhang Guoli, Xu Qing, Jin Liu, Chen Kun, Wang Xueqi, Vivian Wu	War/Historical	Celebrating the 60th year after the founding of the People's Republic of China and the Chinese Civil War fought with the Republic of China. Featuring more than 90 guest actors from the Greater China Region.
Gasp	Zheng Zhong	John Savage, Ge You, Kelly Lin	Comedy/Drama	
Invisible Killer	Wang Jing	Yin Xiaotian, Feng Bo, Li Yixiang	Thriller	
Iron Men	Yin Li	Wu Gang, Liu Ye	Drama	
Judge	Liu Jie	Ni Dahong	Drama	
Jump	Stephen Fung	Zhang Yuqi	Comedy	China/Hong Kong co-production
Lao Wu's Oscar	Li Kelong	Li Yixiang	Comedy/Romance	
Legend of the Tang Empire	Jin Tiemu		Docudrama	
Lemonade	Pu Jun		Romance	
Looking for Jackie	Fang Gangliang, Jiang Ping	Jackie Chan, Zhang Yishan	Action	
Love in Translation	Liang Shan	Vanessa Branch, Dong Yanlin	Romance	
Martial Spirit	Kau Chim Man	Theresa Fu; Owodog; Da Zhengwei		
Memory of Love	Wang Chao	Yan Bingyan, Li Naiwen	Romance/Drama	French/Chinese/Bulgarian co-production
The Message	Gao Qunshu, Chen Kuo-fu	Huang Xiaoming, Li Bingbing	Spy/Thriller	
Mulan	Jingle Ma, Wei Dong	Zhao Wei, Chen Kun, Jaycee Chan	Historical/Drama/Action	
My Internship Life	Zhang Rao	Shen Jiani, Hai Yitian	Romance	
One 2008th	Chen Kaige; Stanley Kwan; Tsui Hark; Xie Jin; Gu Changwei; Wang Xiaoshaui; Zhang Yibai; Lu Chuan; Wang Guangli	Aaron Kwok, Bowie Lam, Jane Zhang, Yao Ming, Betty Sun		
One Night in Supermarket	Yang Qing	Li Xiaolu, Qiao Renliang	Comedy/Crime	
Oxhide II	Liu Jiayin	Liu Jiayin	Docudrama	
Red Cliff: Episode 2	John Woo	Tony Leung Chiu-Wai, Takeshi Kaneshiro, Zhang Fengyi	Historical epic	
Red River	Zhang Jiarui	Zhang Jingchu	Drama	
A Simple Noodle Story	Zhang Yimou	Sun Honglei, Ni Dahong	Thriller/Comedy	Entered into the 60th Berlin International Film Festival
Snowfall in Taipei	Huo Jianqi	Chen Bolin, Tang Yao, Yang Yu-ning	Romance	Chinese/Taiwanese co-production
Sophie's Revenge	Eva Jin	Zhang Ziyi, Fan Bingbing, So Ji-sub	Comedy	Chinese/South Korean co-production
Spring Fever	Lou Ye	Qin Hao	Drama	Entered into the 2009 Cannes Film Festival
Taishan Kung-Fu	Wang Ping	Wu Yue, Xu Huanhuan	Action	
Tracing Shadow	Francis Ng; Marco Mak	Francis Ng; Jaycee Chan	Wuxia/comedy	Hong Kong-Chinese co-production
Trail of the Panda	Zhong Yu	Daichi Hanashima	Family	Disney-financed mainland production
The Treasure Hunter	Chu Yen-Ping	Jay Chou, Lin Chiling, Chen Daoming	Action	Chinese/Taiwanese co-production
The Warrior and the Wolf	Tian Zhuangzhuang	Maggie Q	Historical/Drama	
Weaving Girl	Wang Quan'an	Yu Nan	Drama	
Wheat	He Ping	Fan Bingbing, Wang Xueqi, Wang Zhiwen	Action/Historical/Drama	

== See also ==
- List of Chinese films of 2008
- List of Chinese films of 2010
