= Spicy Love Soup =

- Film poster
- Traditional Chinese: 愛情麻辣燙
- Simplified Chinese: 爱情麻辣烫
- Hanyu Pinyin: Aìqíng málà tāng
- Directed by: Zhang Yang
- Written by: Zhang Yang; Cai Shangjun; Diao Yi'nan; Liu Fendou
- Produced by: Zhang Peimin
- Cinematography: Zhang Jian
- Edited by: Yang Hongyu
- Music by: Jia Minshu
- Distributed by: Xi'an Film Studio
- Release date: May 1997
- Running time: 109 minutes
- Language: Mandarin
- Budget: US$200,000

Spicy Love Soup (Chinese: 爱情麻辣烫; pinyin: Aìqíng Má Là Tāng) is a 1997 Chinese film directed by Zhang Yang and written by Zhang, Liu Fendou, Cai Shangjun, and Diao Yi'nan based on a story by Zhang and Peter Loehr. Spicy Love Soup was produced by Loehr's Imar Film Company, Xi'an Film Studio, and Taiwanese financing.

The film is Zhang's directorial debut and would prove to be a launching pad for those both in front and behind the cameras. Screenwriters Cai Shangjun (The Red Awn) and Diao Yi'nan (Uniform, Night Train) have since gone on to direct their own films, while Liu Fendou has expanded into both directing (Green Hat) and film production (Zhang Yibai's Spring Subway). The cast is also notable for the debuts of two of China's most popular actresses, Gao Yuanyuan and Xu Jinglei.

The film is an anthology of sorts, and tells its story of love and life in modern Beijing through a series of six vignettes.

Spicy Love Soup was, in addition, the first film in mainland China to see a simultaneous release of a soundtrack, consisting largely of contemporary pop songs.

== Cast ==
=== First vignette ===
- Wang Xuebing, a husband
- Liu Jie, his wife

=== Second vignette ===
- Tang Sifu, an elderly widow
- Li Mei, her daughter
- Liu Zhao, a suitor
- Li Tang, a suitor
- Wen Xingyu, a suitor
- Wakin Chau, a neighbor

=== Third vignette ===
- Zhao Miao, a school boy,
- Gao Yuanyuan, his object of affection

=== Fourth vignette ===
- Guo Tao, a husband
- Xu Fan, and his wife

=== Fifth vignette ===
- Sun Yisheng, a young boy
- Pu Cunxin, his father
- Lü Liping, his mother

=== Sixth vignette ===
- Shao Bing, a young man
- Xu Jinglei, a young woman

== Reception ==
Released internationally in London's East West Film Festival in June 1998, Spicy Love Soup was generally well received by western critics. Derek Elley of Variety cited the film as being a pioneering example of the "well directed" Chinese movie, that nevertheless doesn't fall into the camp of "artier" fare. The film was also well received in mainland China, where it had been released a year earlier, becoming one of the most successful independent films released domestically.
