= Ash Is Purest White =

2018 film

- Chinese theatrical release poster

Chinese name
- Traditional Chinese: 江湖兒女
- Simplified Chinese: 江湖儿女
- Literal meaning: Sons and Daughters of Jianghu
Transcriptions
Standard Mandarin
- Hanyu Pinyin: jiānghú érnǚ
- Directed by: Jia Zhangke
- Written by: Jia Zhangke
- Starring: Zhao Tao; Liao Fan
- Cinematography: Éric Gautier
- Edited by: Matthieu Laclau; Xudong Lin
- Music by: Lim Giong
- Release dates: 11 May 2018 (Cannes); 21 September 2018 (China)
- Running time: 136 minutes
- Country: China
- Languages: Standard Chinese; Jin Chinese; Sichuanese Mandarin
- Box office: $12 million

Ash Is Purest White (Chinese: 江湖儿女; 'Sons and Daughters of Jianghu') is a 2018 Chinese drama film written and directed by Jia Zhangke. The story is loosely based on the leader of a gang from Jia Zhangke's childhood, whom he had admired as a role model.

The film had its world premiere at the main competition of the 2018 Cannes Film Festival on 11 May 2018, where it was nominated for the Palme d'Or. It was theatrically released in China on 21 September 2018. Like the rest of Jia's films, it opened to widespread acclaim.

== Plot ==
In 2001, Qiao and her boyfriend Bin, a mob boss, have a lot of power in Datong, an old mining city that has become poor since the coal prices dropped. After Bin's boss is murdered, Qiao suggests they run away from everything and get married, but Bin is not interested. One night a group of motorcyclists attack Bin and his driver, claiming to dethrone him. Qiao grabs Bin's handgun and fires two warning shots into the air, scaring off the attackers.

The police tell Qiao that the gun is illegally owned and asks her whose it is; she repeatedly claims it is hers. She spends five years in prison for possessing an illegal firearm but Bin does not visit her during that time. After Qiao is released, she tries to call him but can never seem to get in touch. She travels by boat to the city in Hubei province where Bin is living but is instead greeted by Bin's new girlfriend—meanwhile, Bin hides in another room. Qiao says that if he wants to break up with her, he will have to tell her himself. She has almost no money to her name so she cons a few strangers for money and food. She hires a motorcycle driver to take her to the power plant where she thinks that Bin works, and along the way the driver suggests that they have sex. She uses this opportunity to steal his bike, and when she gets to the power plant she reports to a police officer that the driver tried to rape her and that he should call her boyfriend Bin. This finally forces Bin to see her.

In a hotel room, Bin says he's a changed man, no longer a "jianghu" gangster, and has no place in his life for Qiao anymore. He can never go back to Datong because he has lost all the respect he once had there. Qiao says that she saved his life and took the blame for him: he should have been waiting for her the day she got out of prison. Since he refuses to say it, she finally says that their relationship is over and he leaves. On a train back to Datong, she meets a passenger who claims to be developing a UFO-hunting tourism company and invites her to join him after she claims to have seen one herself. But after they transfer onto another train, he admits that it was all a lie. She gets off the train, sees a bright object fly swiftly overhead, and makes her way back to Datong.

In 2017, Qiao gets a call from Bin, and when she picks him up, finds him using a wheelchair. She brings him back to their old gambling parlor where she now works and many of his old friends are happy to see him. He is closed-off and hot-tempered, immediately starting fights, and Qiao nearly throws him out. He tells her that he had a stroke from drinking too much and she finds a doctor to help rehabilitate him. When he can walk again, he sneaks out of Qiao's building with just a brief voicemail to say he has left. Qiao goes to the front door when she learns he has gone but she cannot see him.

== Cast ==
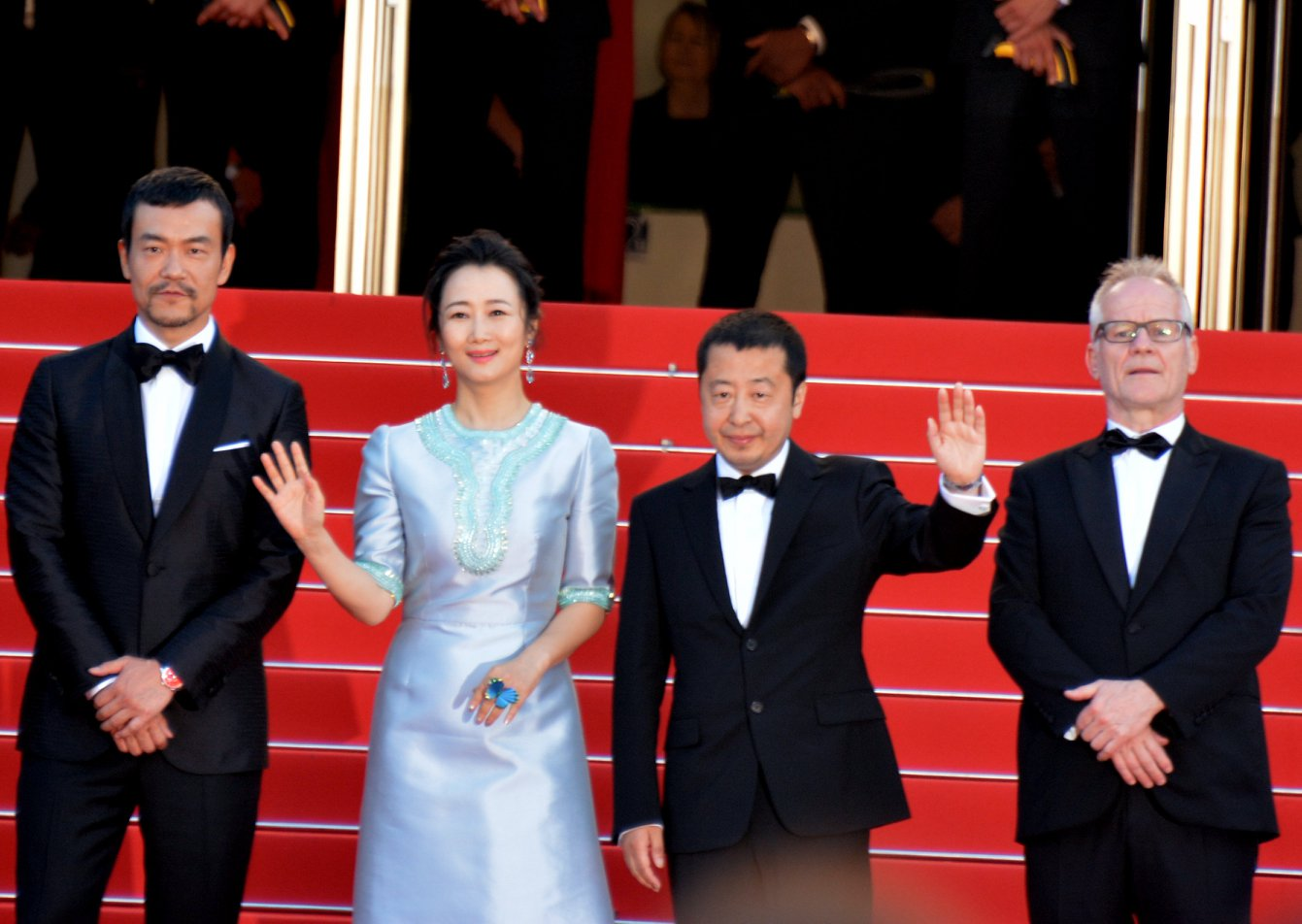
Cast and director at the 2018 Cannes Film Festival.

- Zhao Tao as Zhao Qiao
- Liao Fan as Guo Bin
- Feng Xiaogang
- Xu Zheng
- Zhang Yibai

== Box office results ==
Ash Is Purest White grossed $422,814 in the United States and Canada, and $11.6 million in other territories, for a worldwide total of $12 million.

== Reception ==
On review aggregator Rotten Tomatoes, the film holds an approval rating of 99% based on 154 reviews, with an average rating of 8.1/10. The website's critical consensus reads, "Ash Is Purest White finds writer-director Zhangke Jia revisiting familiar themes while continuing to observe modern Chinese society with an urgent, empathetic eye." On Metacritic, the film has an average weighted score of 85 out of 100, based on 34 critics, indicating "universal acclaim".

Peter Bradshaw of The Guardian described the film style as futurism and social realism, and reviewed the movie "feels like a gripping parable for the vanity of human wishes, and another impassioned portrait of national malaise."

A. A. Dowd of The A.V. Club gave the film a B+, saying that "It’s a surprisingly funny, even loopy film at times, with bursts of slapstick and screwball humor, plus a sporadic absurdism." The theme of self-sacrifice, rather than revenge, has been highlighted, with the context of the development of China.

Barack Obama included the film on his 2019 end of year favorites list.

== Accolades ==
Award	Date of ceremony	Category	Recipient(s)	Result	Ref(s)
Asia Pacific Screen Awards	29 November 2018	Best Performance by Actress	Zhao Tao	Winner	
