= Love in the City =

Love in the City may refer to:

- Love in the City (1953 film), Italian production
- Boy & Girl, a 2003 Chinese TV series also known as Love in the City in some countries
- Love in the City (2007 film), a Hong Kong production film
- Love in the City (2014 TV series), American reality genre production, see 2014 in American television
