= Cai Shangjun =

Chinese film director and screenwriter

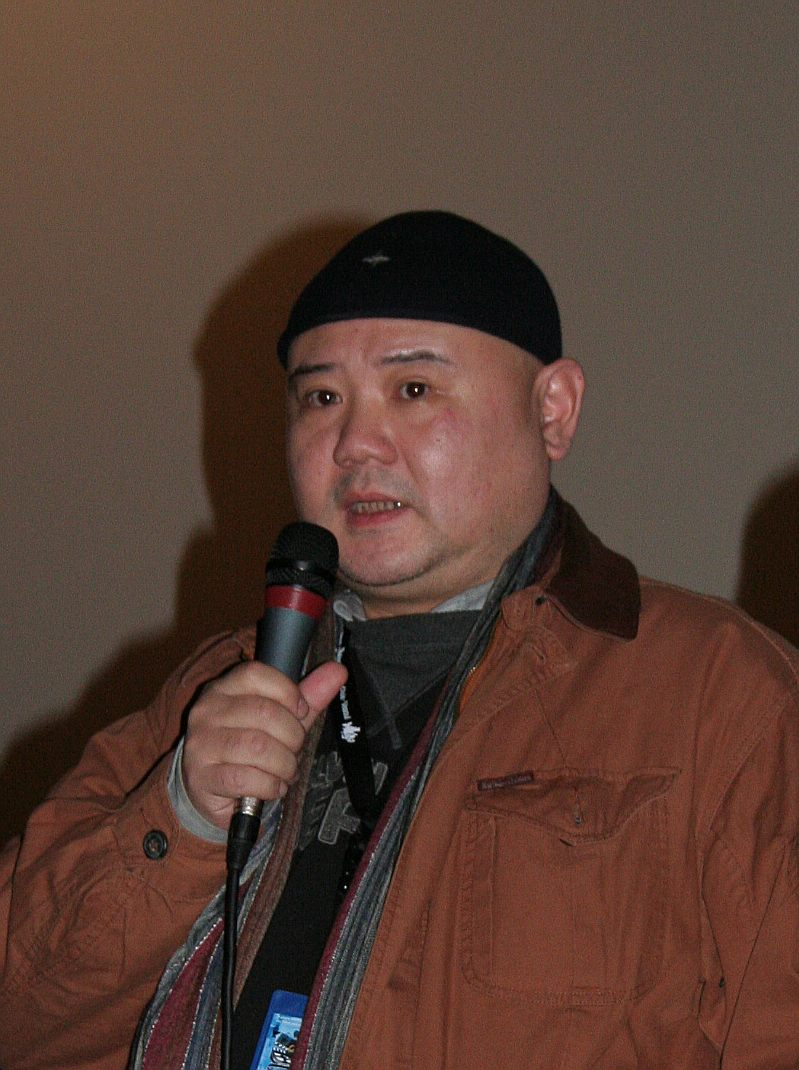
- Shangjun in 2008
- Born: 1967 (age 58–59); Beijing, China
- Citizenship: Chinese
- Occupations: Director, screenwriter

Cai Shangjun
- Chinese: 蔡尚君
Transcriptions
Standard Mandarin
- Hanyu Pinyin: Cài Shàngjūn
- Wade–Giles: Ts'ai Shangchün
Yue: Cantonese
- Yale Romanization: Tsai4 Shang4 jyun1
- Jyutping: Coi^{3} Soeng^{6} gwan^{1}

Cai Shangjun (Chinese: 蔡尚君; pinyin: Cài Shàngjūn) is a Chinese film director and screenwriter, part of the Chinese sixth generation of cinema. Most known for his 2011 film People Mountain People Sea, which won the Silver Lion for Best Direction at the 68th Venice International Film Festival.

== Career ==
Cai graduated from the Central Academy of Drama in 1992. Since then, his major work has been that of a professional screenwriter. Cai was part of the team, along with Zhang Yang, Diao Yi'nan and Liu Fendou, that co-wrote the screenplays for two of Zhang's films: Spicy Love Soup (1997) and Shower (1999). Cai also cowrote a script for Zhang's Sunflower (2005).

In 2007, Cai directed his first film, The Red Awn, which won the FIPRESCI Prize at the 2007 Pusan International Film Festival.

In 2011, Cai won the Silver Lion for the Best Director at the 68th Venice International Film Festival with the film People Mountain People Sea.

== Filmography ==
=== Feature films ===
Year	English title	Original title	Notes
2007	The Red Awn	红色康拜因	
2011	People Mountain People Sea	人山人海	Silver Lion winner
2017	The Conformist	冰之下	
2025	The Sun Rises on Us All	日掛中天	

=== As screenwriter ===
Year	English Title	Chinese Title	Director
1997	Spicy Love Soup	爱情麻辣烫	Zhang Yang
1999	Shower	洗澡	Zhang Yang
2005	Sunflower	向日葵	Zhang Yang
