= Peter Loehr =

Peter Loehr is an American film producer and executive who spent the bulk of his career in Asia.

After getting his start in Japan and Taiwan, Loehr started China's first independent film company, Imar Film Co. in 1996. As a producer Loehr was notable for not only producing films, but for being the first to market and distribute movies in house.

Through Imar, Loehr produced five independent films in China: Spicy Love Soup, A Beautiful New World, Shower, "All the Way" and "Quitting". These films went on to box office success in China with "Spicy Love Soup" winning many domestic awards. "A Beautiful New World" attended the Berlin Film Festival and won awards both in China and at the Hawaii International Film Festival. "Shower" won many awards at international festivals including Toronto, San Sebastian, Thessaloniki, Rotterdam, Udine and Seattle, and "Quitting" won awards at the Bangkok, Singapore and Stockholm Film Festivals.

In 2002 Loehr formed a new entity, Ming Productions and produced four more films: "Sunflower", "Jade Warrior", "The Children of Huang Shi" and "One Last Dance".

"Sunflower" (directed by Zhang Yang, starring Sun Haiying and Joan Chen) won Best Director and Best Cinematography awards at the 2005 San Sebastian Film Festival. Loehr's seventh film, "One Last Dance" (directed by Max Makowski, starring Francis Ng, Ti Lung and Harvey Keitel) attended the Sundance Film Festival in the World Dramatic Competition. In 2005, Loehr was a producer on "Jade Warrior", a Finnish/Dutch/Estonian co-production that premiered at the 2006 Toronto Film Festival and had strong opening weekends at both the Chinese and Finnish box offices In 2007, Loehr was a producer on "The Children of Huang Shi", a German/Australian/Chinese co-production directed by Roger Spottiswoode and starring Jonathan Rhys Meyers, Radha Mitchell, Chow Yun-Fat and Michelle Yeoh. The film was released world-wide in 2008.

In January 2005, Peter Loehr became managing director of the Creative Artists Agency (CAA) in China. During Loehr's seven-year tenure leading CAA in Asia, the agency grew to represent over fifty artists in China, Hong Kong, Japan and Korea. CAA was also involved the packaging of over 50 films by filmmakers like Xu Zheng, & Ning Hao. Between 2005-2012, CAA China directors and actors won awards including the Golden Horse for best Actor (Huang Bo) and the Golden Bear at the Berlin International Film Festival (Wang Quanan). Talent signed to CAA during Loehr's tenure as managing director, including Daniel Wu and Karen Mok.

In April 2012, Peter Loehr joined Legendary Pictures and became CEO of its China joint venture - Legendary East, a film company focusing on big budget Sino-US co-productions with subjects based on Chinese history, mythology, or culture. Loehr was central to bringing Chinese financiers into some decidedly US films like "Warcraft", "Kong: Skull Island" and "Pacific Rim Uprising". He was one of the producers of The Great Wall, directed by Zhang Yimou, and starring Matt Damon, Willem Dafoe, Pedro Pascal and Andy Lau. The Great Wall was the largest ever US-China co-production, and the largest production ever shot in China. It was released worldwide through Universal Studios in 2017 and grossed over $334 million worldwide, including $170 million in China.

In 2016, Legendary Entertainment was sold to Wanda Group. Loehr exited Legendary in 2017.

Since October 2019, Loehr serves on the board of IMAX China Holdings, the Hong Kong listed China arm of IMAX Corporation, as an advisor to the Hong Kong Film Financing Forum, as Asia advisor for Genies, Inc. and as director of his production company, PX Productions.

Peter Loehr is a graduate of the Georgetown University School of Foreign Service and speaks fluent Mandarin and Japanese.
