= Curiosity Kills the Cat (film) =

- Film poster
- Directed by: Zhang Yibai
- Written by: Huo Xin; Zhang Yibai
- Produced by: Jimmy Wu; Thomas Ho; Jane Shao
- Starring: Carina Lau; Hu Jun; Song Jia; Liao Fan; Lin Yuan
- Cinematography: Yang Tao
- Edited by: Zhang Yifan
- Music by: Daniel Walker
- Distributed by: Golden Network
- Release date: 12 October 2006 (China)
- Running time: 93 minutes
- Country: China
- Language: Mandarin

Curiosity Kills the Cat (simplified Chinese: 好奇害死猫; traditional Chinese: 好奇害死貓; pinyin: Hàoqí hàisǐ māo) is a 2006 Chinese thriller film directed by Zhang Yibai. The film is set in the director's home city of Chongqing. Produced by China Vision Group and Eagle Spirit Management, Curiosity Kills the Cat stars Hu Jun, Liao Fan, as well as veteran Hong Kong actress Carina Lau. Though primarily a mainland Chinese production, international sales was handled by Hong Kong–based Golden Network.

Lau would win a Best Actress Golden Rooster Award for her work in the film.

Curiosity Kills the Cat was to some critics, most notably Variety's Derek Elley, a prime example of the kind of popular but well-crafted entertainment that China's film industry had begun to produce.

== Plot ==
Curiosity Kills the Cat tells the same story of an affair gone sour in a modern Chinese city (in this case, Chongqing) from four separate perspectives. In the first part of the film, the story is told from the point of view of a young woman, Momo (Lin Yuan), who works in a photography store located in the same building as a luxury apartment complex. Momo has begun to secretly observe (and take pictures with her camera phone) John Zheng (Hu Jun) as he carries on an affair with Sharon (Song Jia), the owner of a nearby nail salon. Momo also observes John's unhappily married wife Rose (Carina Lau), as she suffers attacks from an unknown vandal who dumps paint on her car and windows.

In the film's second part, the story of John and Sharon is retold, this time from John's perspective and how he became involved with the younger woman. The story is retold once again in the film's third part, now from the perspective of a security guard (Liao Fan). In this part of the film, John and Rose's young child is kidnapped and a murder of one of the characters causes disarray to all the characters' lives.

== Cast ==
- Carina Lau as Rose Feng (千羽), John's unhappily married wife.
- Hu Jun as John Zheng (郑重), a middle-aged man married to Rose with a young child. The film's second act is from his perspective.
- Song Jia as Sharon Liang (梁晓霞), a young woman who has opened a manicure business next to John and Rose's apartment complex; she is John's mistress.
- Liao Fan as Liu Fendou (刘奋斗), the security guard in John and Rose's apartment building. The film's third act is told from Liu's perspective.
- Lin Yuan as Momo (陌陌), a young woman who works in a camera shop, she has taken to observing the marital strife between her neighbors, John and Rose. The film's first act is from Momo's point of view.

== Censorship ==
In a bizarre turn, during the film's development process, a technician confiscated several reels for fear that the film's sex scenes would never make it past the censors. The technician, an employee at the Beijing Film Developing and Printing & Video Laboratory, refused to print the film or return the negatives. Ten years earlier, the same lab technician had been punished by the China Film Bureau over a similar matter, reportedly leading him to be "a bit jumpy." State Administration of Radio, Film, and Television (SARFT) officials eventually had to contact the lab "consenting" to the film's production. The process still required that the filmmakers institute a number of extensive cuts.

The incident prompted the film's producer, Jimmy Wu to renew calls for a Chinese film rating system.

== Oscar nomination bid ==
In late 2006, Curiosity Kills the Cat made a bid to become China's nomination for best foreign film in the Academy Awards. The decision to push the film by producer Jimmy Wu was seen as odd in comparison to the previous six Chinese films to be selected, all of which were historical epics or high-budget wuxia pictures (such as Zhang Yimou's Hero). Wu argued that the Academy of Motion Picture Arts and Sciences had grown weary of the same historical films every year coming from China and that Curiosity's more realistic depiction of a modern China would appeal to judges. Despite the push, the nomination spot went to Zhang Yimou's historical epic Curse of the Golden Flower which was ultimately not selected to compete for the award. Wu, however, called for hearings suggesting that Curse violated Academy rules when its screening in China was switched, at the last moment, from Shenyang to Beijing.
