= My Fair Son =

- Film poster
- Directed by: Cui Zi'en
- Written by: Cui Zi'en
- Produced by: Shining Liu; Weiming Wang
- Starring: Yu Bo; Junrui Wang; Weiming Wang; Guifeng Wang; Ziqiang Li
- Cinematography: Jin Yang
- Edited by: Ziyi Qi; Ningning Zu
- Music by: Guofeng Wang
- Production companies: Cuizi DV Studio; Milimitel Film
- Distributed by: dGenerate Films; Water Bearer Films
- Release date: 2007
- Running time: 92 minutes
- Country: China
- Language: Mandarin

My Fair Son (Chinese: 我如花似玉的儿子) is a 2007 Chinese gay-themed film (first released for public exhibition in the United States in 2009), by Chinese film director Cui Zi'en. The main characters are Rui (Ray) and the object of his affection, Bo, an employee of his father. The film contains full-frontal male nudity.

== Plot ==
A teenage boy, Ray, returns home from a life with his grandfather to live with his father, after they have been estranged for several years. During the period of their estrangement, Ray spent much of his youth rebelling against his father's lifestyle. After he enrolls in an art school, Ray becomes romantically involved, in a relationship, with another male student, and the pair soon become lovers. His father discovers the two young men in bed together, and begins to understand what it means to live as a homosexual. Ray then meets one of his father's employees, Bo, and falls in love with him, too. Bo is engaged, and admits to Ray's father that he is in love with his son. The father fires Bo and lies to Ray that he left on his own will. Ray does not accept his father's argument. The film ends with Ray roaming on a terrace with floating transparent images of his childhood pictures.

== Cast ==
- Junrui Wang as Xiao Rui (Ray)
- Weiming Wang as Father of Xiao Rui
- Yu Bo as Xiao Bo
- Guifeng Wang as Unnamed first boyfriend of Xiao Rui
- Ziqiang Li as Unnamed friend of Xiao Rui

== See also ==
- List of Chinese films of 2007
- List of lesbian, gay, bisexual or transgender-related films
- List of lesbian, gay, bisexual, or transgender-related films by storyline
- Nudity in film (East Asian cinema since 1929)
