= Green Hat =

2004 film directed by Liu Fendou

- DVD cover
- Directed by: Liu Fendou
- Written by: Liu Fendou
- Produced by: Lu Yan; Peggy Chiao
- Starring: Li Congxi; Liao Fan; Dong Lifan; Hai Yitian; Li Mei
- Cinematography: Chen Ying; Peng Li
- Edited by: Jia Cuiping
- Music by: Jin Wulin
- Production company: Almost Entertainment Pictures
- Release date: 7 May 2004 (Tribeca)
- Running time: 100 min.
- Country: China
- Language: Mandarin

Green Hat (Chinese: 绿帽子; pinyin: lǜ màozǐ) (also known as The Green Hat) is a Chinese film from 2003 and the debut of screenwriter Liu Fendou. Starring Li Congxi, Liao Fan, and Dong Lifan, the film tells the story of two men, one a bank robber, and the other a police officer, and their shared problem of unfaithful partners. In China, the phrase "wearing a green hat", refers to a cuckold. The film features full-frontal male nudity.

The film was well received by both critics and festival audiences, notably at the 2004 Tribeca Film Festival where it won a prize for Best Narrative Feature.

== Plot ==
Wang Yao (Liao Fan) is a criminal. Along with two friends, he prepares one last heist with the plan that he will head to the United States afterward for a reunion with a girlfriend he has not seen in two years. After the successful robbery of a bank, Wang stops at a small grocery store to call his girlfriend, who ceremoniously dumps him. Distraught, Wang takes the grocery store's proprietor hostage when she demands payment for the long-distance phone call. When the police arrives, one of them (Li Congxi) offers to take the place of the hostage. Wang agrees, and then promptly commits suicide after asking the shocked officer, "What is love?"

The film then shifts its attention to the police officer, who now begins to face the fact that his wife (Li Mei) has been carrying on an affair with a swimming coach (Hai Yitian). Struggling from sexual inadequacy and humiliation, the officer decides to confront his wife and her lover.

== Reception ==
Green Hat was screened at numerous international film festivals including Tribeca, Seattle, and Thessaloniki.

Western critics were generally positive in their reaction to the film, with the film winning a Best Narrative Feature from Tribeca, and FIPRESCI awarding a best film award to it at the Thessaloniki Film Festival, Critics, such as Variety's Derek Elley, found the film to be a strong debut by Liu and praised the film's visual composition and unusual sexual frankness.

== See also ==
- List of Chinese films of 2003
- Nudity in film (East Asian cinema since 1929)
