= Paths of the Soul =

2015 film by Zhang Yang

- Poster
- Directed by: Zhang Yang
- Written by: Zhang Yang
- Produced by: Zhang Yang
- Starring: Yang Pei; Nyima Zadui; Tsewang Dolkar; Tsring Chodron; Seba Jiangcuo
- Cinematography: Guo Daming
- Edited by: Wei Le; Kong Jinlei
- Release dates: 15 September 2015 (Toronto); 20 June 2017 (China)
- Running time: 115 minutes
- Country: China
- Language: Tibetan
- Box office: CN¥100.1 million (China)

Paths of the Soul (Chinese: 冈仁波齐Standard Tibetan: གངས་རིན་པོ་ཆེ, gangs rin po che) is a 2015 Chinese film directed, written, and produced by Zhang Yang. It tells of a journey taken by Tibetan villagers on a 1,200 kilometer pilgrimage to Lhasa. The film was released in a limited run in North America in May 2016 and in China in June 2017.

== Release ==
The film premiered at the 2015 Toronto International Film Festival. It was subsequently presented at the 2015 Busan International Film Festival, 2016 Vilnius International Film Festival, 2016 Hong Kong International Film Festival, 2016 Goteborg International Film Festival, 2016 Rotterdam International Film Festival, and the 2016 Seattle International Film Festival, among others.

The film was given a limited release in North America on 13 May 2016. It was also shown at the Museum of Modern Art in New York City from 13 to 19 May 2016. The film was released in China on 20 June 2017. Carried by positive reviews and audience reaction, the film has grossed CN¥100.1 million in China, and became a surprise art house box office hit. It has a 90/100 average on Metacritic.

== Awards and nominations ==
Awards	Category	Recipient	Result	Ref.
23rd Huading Awards	Best Film	—N/a	Pending	
