= A Season of Good Rain =

2009 South Korean film

Season of Good Rain
- Theatrical release poster
- Hangul: 호우시절
- Hanja: 好雨時節
- RR: Housijeol
- MR: Housijŏl
- Directed by: Hur Jin-ho
- Written by: Hur Jin-ho; Lee Han-eol
- Produced by: Kim Chul-soo; Gina Kim; Im Hee-chul
- Starring: Jung Woo-sung; Gao Yuanyuan
- Cinematography: Kim Byeong-seo
- Edited by: Choi Jae-geun
- Music by: Lee Jae-jin
- Production companies: Pancinema; Zonbo Media
- Distributed by: Next Entertainment World (South Korea); China Film Group Corporation (China)
- Release dates: October 8, 2009 (South Korea); March 5, 2010 (China)
- Running time: 100 minutes
- Countries: China; South Korea
- Languages: English; Korean; Chinese
- Box office: US$1.8 million

Season of Good Rain (Korean: 호우시절; RR: Housijeol), also known as A Good Rain Knows, is a 2009 romantic drama film directed by Hur Jin-ho. It stars Jung Woo-sung and Gao Yuanyuan. The film was released in South Korean theaters on October 8, 2009 and had a total of 287,887 admissions.

Originally intended as the second segment of Chengdu, I Love You, the director and producers expanded its running time and released it as a stand-alone feature.

== Plot ==
Dong-ha is a thirty-something Korean architect on a business trip to Chengdu where his company is carrying out construction projects to rebuild the city after the earthquake of 2008. By chance, he meets May, an old friend from his school days in the United States. May is originally from Chengdu, where she had returned to after graduation; she works as a tour guide. Dong-ha and May had feelings for each other then, but they parted before they had a chance to define or declare them. Now that they are thrown together again, they find that these old feelings reignite and new ones form.

== Cast ==
- Jung Woo-sung as Park Dong-ha
- Gao Yuanyuan as May (Wu Yue)
- Kim Sang-ho as President Ji
- Ma Shaohua as Director Ma
