= Lost Indulgence =

- Film poster
- Directed by: Zhang Yibai
- Written by: Zhao Tianyu
- Produced by: Tsui Siu-Ming; Amy Li; Zhang Yibai
- Starring: Karen Mok; Tan Jianci; Jiang Wenli; Eric Tsang; Eason Chan
- Cinematography: Wang Yu
- Edited by: Kong Jinglei
- Distributed by: Sundream Motion Pictures
- Release dates: April 25, 2008 (Tribeca Film Festival); October 13, 2009 (China)
- Running time: 104 minutes
- Country: China
- Language: Mandarin

Lost Indulgence (Chinese: 秘岸; pinyin: mì àn) (also stylized as Lost, Indulgence or Lost·Indulgence) is a 2008 Chinese film directed by Zhang Yibai and written by Zhao Tianyu. Like Zhang's earlier film, Curiosity Kills the Cat, Lost Indulgence takes place in the central Chinese city of Chongqing.

The film is a family drama about the relationship between a mother and son (Jiang Wenli and Tan Jianci) after the sudden death of the father (Eric Tsang).

Lost Indulgence navigated a complicated series of schedules and cancellations before it was allowed to screen abroad, at the Tribeca Film Festival in April 2008.

== Plot ==
Upon the apparent death of his taxi-driver father (Eric Tseng), Xian-chuen (Tan Jianci) and his mother Li (Jiang Wenli) take in his father's last fare, Su-Dan (Karen Mok), a bar girl, to fulfill the family's obligations. The father, Wu Tao drove his cab into the Yangtze River, breaking Su-Dan's leg and potentially paralyzing her for life, though his body was not recovered.

The son, a bereaved and sullen teenager, does not take to the crippled Su-Dan at first, his thoughts preoccupied with a school crush and the sudden death of his father. As time goes on, however he warms to her presence (and her ever-exposed legs). Su-Dan, restricted to a wheelchair sees the boy as a substitute little brother.

Meanwhile, Li, who works as a medic at a factory, is forced to work double shifts at a veterinarian hospital to help make ends meet. There she meets a handsome stranger (Eason Chan) who brings in his injured dog, and a tentative romance begins to form.

== Cast ==
- Jiang Wenli as Li, the mother in the family. She takes on her husband's last passenger before his death.
- Tan Jianci as Xian-chuen, Li and Wu Tao's sullen teenage son.
- Eric Tseng as the father, Wu Tao, a taxi-driver, Li's husband and Xian-chuen's father, early in the film he is killed when his taxi plunges off a bridge into a river.
- Karen Mok as Su-Dan, a crippled bar girl who was Li's husband's last passenger.
- Eason Chan

== Release ==
Lost Indulgence navigated a complicated series of schedules and cancellations before it was allowed to screen abroad. Originally scheduled to premiere at the 2008 Hong Kong International Film Festival, the film was pulled at the last moment by its producers due to failure to gain Chinese censor approval. For many in the industry, the decision to withdraw the film was fallout from the decision by the State Administration of Radio, Film, and Television to ban director Lou Ye and producer Nai An for improperly screening their 2006 film Summer Palace at the Cannes Film Festival without permission. Others saw the heightened concern as a result of public criticism and controversy surrounding Ang Lee's sexually explicit Lust, Caution and Feng Xiaogang's allegorical war story Assembly. The withdrawal of the film was also seen as a sign of the growing influence that the Chinese Film Bureau has had on Hong Kong productions (or in this case co-productions).

Lost Indulgence missed a second scheduled screening at the Udine East Asian Film Festival, when a screening was again canceled due to failure to obtain official permission. Upon this second cancellation, critics speculated that producers were taking extra care before the Olympics rather than seeing the delays as a clear-cut case of censorship.

Despite these setbacks, the film eventually did get its international premiere at the 2008 Tribeca Film Festival on April 25, 2008.

== Critical reception ==
The film opened to mixed reviews.

Perry Lam of Muse called the movie 'an object lesson in how bad casting can skew a movie irredeemably.'
