= People Mountain People Sea (film) =

- Theatrical release poster
- Directed by: Cai Shangjun
- Written by: Cai Shangjun; Gu Zheng; Gu Xiaobai
- Produced by: Li Xudong
- Starring: Chen Jianbin; Tao Hong; Wu Xiubo
- Cinematography: Dong Jinsong
- Edited by: Yang Hongyu
- Music by: Zhou Jiaojiao
- Production company: Sunrise Media
- Distributed by: China Film Group Corporation
- Release dates: September 6, 2011 (Venice); August 3, 2012 (China)
- Running time: 90 minutes
- Country: China
- Language: Mandarin

People Mountain People Sea (Chinese: 人山人海; pinyin: Rén shān rén hǎi) is a 2011 Chinese film directed by Cai Shangjun. It was selected for the main competition at the 68th Venice International Film Festival, where it won Silver Lion for Best Director for Cai. The film follows a man as he attempts to track down his brother's murderer.

== Cast ==
- Chen Jianbin as Tie
- Tao Hong as Tianxin, Tie's ex-girlfriend who bore his illegitimate son
- Wu Xiubo as Xiao Qiang, criminal who killed Tie's brother

== Release ==
The film was released in two different versions in China and abroad. In the domestic (censored) version, Xiao Qiang is caught by the police (he escapes from a medical clinic after being beaten), while the other miners are all rescued by the police following the explosion. This version ends with police officers instructing Tie to obey the laws. In the international version, Xiao Qiang is bludgeoned to death underground by fellow miners, and the other miners (except for the boy) all die in the final explosion.
