= Liu Fendou =

Chinese screenwriter and director

- Born: 1969 (age 56–57); Beijing, China
- Occupations: Film director, screenwriter, film producer
- Years active: 1990s-2000s
- Awards: FIPRESCI Prize; 2004 Green Hat (Thessaloniki)

Chinese name
- Traditional Chinese: 劉奮斗
- Simplified Chinese: 刘奋斗
Transcriptions
Standard Mandarin
- Hanyu Pinyin: Líu Fèn Dǒu

Liu Fendou (simplified Chinese: 刘奋斗; traditional Chinese: 劉奮斗; pinyin: Líu Fèn Dǒu) (born 1969, Beijing) is a Chinese film director, screenwriter and film producer.

== Biography ==
Born in Beijing, Liu Fendou spent some time in the United States in his youth "generally doing a whole lot of nothing" until returning to Beijing in 1995.

Upon his return to China, Liu entered the film world, and soon became a major figure in China's independent film scene. Beginning his career as a screenwriter collaborating with Zhang Yang in his films Spicy Love Soup, and Shower, and Shi Runjiu in Beautiful New World, Liu eventually moved on to founding his own independent production company, Electric Orange Entertainment, which helped finance and produce Zhang Yibai's debut film Spring Subway.

In 2004, Liu released his directorial debut, the comedy-drama Green Hat. It was followed by the release of Ocean Flame, produced by Simon Yam Tat-wah, in 2008.

== Filmography ==
=== As screenwriter ===
Year	English Title	Chinese Title	Director
1997	Spicy Love Soup	爱情麻辣烫	Zhang Yang
1999	A Beautiful New World	美丽新世界	Shi Runjiu
1999	Shower	洗澡	Zhang Yang
2003	Spring Subway	开往春天的地铁	Zhang Yibai
2004	Green Hat	绿帽子	Liu Fendou
2008	Ocean Flame	一半是火焰,一半是海水	Liu Fendou
2008	Plastic City	塑料城市	Yu Lik-wai

=== As director ===
Year	English Title	Chinese Title	Notes
2004	Green Hat	绿帽子	FIPRESCI Prize winner at the 2004 Thessaloniki Film Festival
2008	Ocean Flame	一半是火焰,一半是海水	
2013	Night Blooming	隔窗有眼	

=== As producer ===
Year	English Title	Chinese Title	Notes
2002	Spring Subway	开往春天的地铁	First film produced by Liu's Electric Orange Entertainment
