= Imar Film Company =

Chinese film company

Imar Film Company is an independent film production company in China. Imar was established in 1997 by American producer Peter Loehr. It was the first legal independent film company in the PRC. Imar handles production, distribution and marketing of films in partnership with Xi'an Film Studio. It specializes in producing low-budget films set in modern urban settings, targeting the urban Chinese youth.

== Music ==
Imar Film Company works with Rock Records of Taiwan, the world's largest Chinese pop music conglomerate, which allows Imar use of Rock Record's substantial music catalog, Mandarin for their soundtracks.

== Films produced ==
- Spicy Love Soup (1997)
- A Beautiful New World (1999)
- Shower (1999)
- The End of the Line
- Quitting (2001)
- Sunflower (2005)
