= Fantasy Pictures =

Chinese film production company

Fantasy Pictures Entertainment
- Company type: Production company Film distributor
- Industry: Chinese cinema
- Founded: 2005
- Headquarters: Beijing, China
- Key people: Lin Fan; Yuan Gadi

Fantasy Pictures Entertainment is a Chinese independent film production company and distributor founded by photographer Lin Fan in 2005. Focusing primarily on independent films, Fantasy was involved in the production of Lou Ye's Summer Palace, Robin Weng's Fujian Blue, and Wang Bing's Fengming, a Chinese Memoir. The company focuses primarily on independent Chinese filmmakers.

Recently, the company under former Polybona Films producer Yuan Gadi has begun to expand into genre films, particularly science fiction.
