= Oxhide =

- Film poster
- Simplified Chinese: 牛皮
- Hanyu Pinyin: niú pí
- Directed by: Liu Jiayin
- Written by: Liu Jiayin
- Starring: Liu Zaiping; Jia Huifen; Liu Jiayin
- Cinematography: Liu Jiayin
- Distributed by: dGenerate Films
- Release date: 13 February 2005 (Berlin)
- Running time: 110 minutes
- Country: China
- Language: Mandarin

Oxhide (Chinese: 牛皮; pinyin: Niú pí), directed by Liu Jiayin, is a 2005 narrative independent Chinese film that portrays the director's family and their apartment in Beijing. Liu was 23 years old when the film was recorded.

== Awards, nominations, and honors ==
- 2005 Berlin International Film Festival
  - Caligari Film Award
  - FIPRESCI Award, Forum of New Cinema
- 2005 Hong Kong International Film Festival
  - Golden DV Award
- 2005 Vancouver International Film Festival
  - Dragons and Tigers Award

== Sequel ==
In 2009, Liu Jiayin directed a sequel to Oxhide, entitled Oxhide II. Again taking her family as the film's subject, Liu takes a simple premise of a family making dumplings and uses it as the film's primary narrative device. The film premiered at the 2009 Cannes Film Festival as part of its Directors Fortnight program.
