= Liu Jiayin =

Chinese independent filmmaker (born 1981)

- Born: 20 August 1981 (age 45); Beijing, China
- Education: Beijing Film Academy
- Occupation: Film director
- Notable work: Oxhide (2005)

Liu Jiayin
- Simplified Chinese: 刘伽茵
- Traditional Chinese: 劉伽茵
Transcriptions
Standard Mandarin
- Hanyu Pinyin: Liú Jiāyīn

Liu Jiayin (born 20 August 1981) is a Chinese independent filmmaker and educator from Beijing. She directed two experimental features combining documentary and narrative elements, Oxhide (2005) and Oxhide II (2009), both of which received international awards.

Liu was called "one of the most exciting and unique talents to emerge from China in the 2000s" by The Hollywood Reporter, with Oxhide being described in 2006 as "the most important Chinese film of the past several years". She has written television dramas and currently teaches screenwriting at the Beijing Film Academy.

== Career ==
Liu aspired to become a filmmaker as early as high school. In 1999, she enrolled in the Beijing Film Academy, majoring in screenwriting. As her graduation project for her master's degree, she completed Oxhide, her full-length feature debut. Liu used digital video and a series of long takes to stage scenes from the life of her family in their cramped Beijing apartment. Her mother and her father—a struggling skilled leather craftsman whose work material gives the film its title—perform their own parts, alongside the 23-year-old director as herself.

Oxhide screened at the 2005 Berlin International Film Festival, where it won the FIPRESCI Prize and Caligari Film Prize. It also screened at the Hong Kong International Film Festival, where Liu received the Golden DV Award for best digital work, and at the Vancouver International Film Festival, where she received the top Dragons and Tigers Award for East Asian cinema.

In 2009 Liu finished her second film, Oxhide II. With a similar focus on her family, this "sequel" was seen as more simple in construction, employing only nine separate shots in a running time of over two hours. All the film's narrative occurs in the real-time process of Liu and her family preparing to make, making, cooking and eating jiaozi (Chinese dumplings). A marked contrast not only to commercial film aesthetics but also with other independent films from China, Oxhide II premiered at the 2009 Cannes Film Festival as part of its Directors Fortnight program. At the end of the year, Oxhide II was named one of the three masterpieces of Chinese cinema in the 2000s by critic Shelly Kraicer.

== Filmography ==
Year	English title	Chinese title	Notes
2002	The Train	火车	Short film
2005	Oxhide	牛皮	
2009	Oxhide II	牛皮贰	
2010	607		Short film
2023	All Ears	不虚此行	
