= Zhou Chuchu =

Chinese film and television actress (born 1986)

- Born: November 15, 1986 (age 39); Chengdu, Sichuan, China
- Occupations: Actress, singer
- Years active: 2004–present

Chinese name
Transcriptions
Standard Mandarin
- Hanyu Pinyin: Zhōu Chǔchǔ
Yue: Cantonese
- Jyutping: zau1 co2 co2

Zhou Chuchu (Chinese: 周楚楚; pinyin: Zhōu Chǔchǔ; born November 15, 1986) is a Chinese film and television actress.

== Biography ==
Zhou was born in 1986 in Chengdu, Sichuan Province. She also has a younger sister. At a young age, she went to Beijing to become a singer, but quit eventually. She made her film debut in Ocean Flame in 2008. She also starred in the biopic Ip Man: The Final Fight in 2013 alongside Hong Kong actor Anthony Wong.

== Filmography ==
=== Film ===
Year	English Title	Chinese Title	Role	Notes
2008	Ocean Flame	一半海水，一半火焰	小白	
2010	Dream Home	維多利亞壹號	大陆妓女	
2013	The Wild Strawberries	野草莓	罗雪梅	
2010	Gangster Rock	混混天團	阿豪女友	
2012	Nightmare	青魇	Luo Xiaoyue; Moon	
2013	Ip Man: The Final Fight	葉問：終極一戰	珍妮 (Jenny)	
2013	Scandals	囧人之越撓越癢	陈紫馨	
2014	The Apostles	詭鎮		
2018	Nice to Meet You			
2018	Impermanence			
2019	My Best Summer			

== Awards ==
- Second Macau International Film Festival: Best Newcomer Actor Award for The Wild Strawberries 野草莓 (2010)
