= Mid-Afternoon Barks =

- Film poster
- Directed by: Zhang Yuedong
- Written by: Zhang Yuedong
- Produced by: Xiao Su
- Starring: Zhang Yuedong
- Cinematography: Dong Jingsong
- Edited by: Yu Xiaowei; Zhang Yuedong
- Music by: Xiao He
- Release date: October 2, 2007 (Vancouver)
- Running time: 77 minutes
- Country: China
- Language: Mandarin

Mid-Afternoon Barks (Chinese: 下午狗叫; pinyin: Xiàwǔ Gǒu Jiào) is a 2007 Chinese film directed by Zhang Yuedong. The film was the first directorial effort for Zhang, who was previously an established theater director in Beijing.

Mid-Afternoon Barks is a surrealist triptych of stories that take place in Beijing, all involving the installation of electrical poles.

The film shared the Dragons and Tigers Award at the 2007 Vancouver International Film Festival with Fujian Blue by director Weng Shouming.

== Plot ==
The first of three stories told in Mid-Afternoon Barks, "The Village and the Stranger", follows a herdsman (Zhang Yuedong) who has abandoned his flock for a village in the Beijing municipality. Taking residence with his roommate (Qieli Dunzhu), he is asked by his landlord (Gadi Qieli) to install an electric metal pole in the courtyard outside their apartment. It becomes increasingly difficult to determine, however, whether the request was part of a dream or not, or indeed if the herdsman is even in Beijing.

In the second tale, entitled "City, Wood, Repairman", three workmen (played by Han Dong, Chu Cheng, and Gouzi) in the city are installing poles but to no apparent purpose. A seemingly unrelated but parallel story between a repairman (Quan Ke) and a young man (the film's composer Xiao He) rounds out this part of the film.

In the final tale, "Watermelon and Farmer", a farmer (Xiao He, again), is constantly bothered by rude customers, children, and workmen, who make him move his cart in order to attach electrical wires to the film's ubiquitous poles.

== Cast ==
- Zhang Yuedong as a shepherd who leaves his flock to visit the outskirts of Beijing.
- Qieli Dunzhu as the shepherd's roommate in his new village.
- GaDi Qieli as the shepherd's landlady.
- Xiao He plays two roles, including a young man in the second part of the triptych and a watermelon seller in the film's conclusion.
- Han Dong, Chu Cheng, and Gouzi play three workmen in Beijing for the film's second story.
- Quan Ke as a repairman in Beijing.
- Dong Zi as one of the watermelon seller's rude customers.

== Style ==
For one critic, Mid-Afternoon Barks was "a distinctive debut that doesn't quite resemble any other Chinese pic out there," and a film that had an "absurdist perspective." A description of the film for its North American premiere at the Vancouver International Film Festival suggested that the "unfinished" nature of the encounters that the characters go through are suggestive of a dream state, an observation echoed by critics.

The film's soundtrack is equally bizarre, incorporating seemingly random noises (including titular barking) whose sources are never revealed. Variety's Derek Elley wrote how, "the enchanting score by Xiao He... brims with strange, percussive sounds and accompanies the sharply edited scenes (often punctuated by brief blackouts)..."

== Reception ==
The release of Mid-Afternoon Barks announced a new voice in Chinese cinema. Time Out's David Jenkins wrote that the film, while requiring a tremendous amount of patience from the audience, was nevertheless a "dreamy, lyrical, and often baffling journey."

For some critics, however, the same qualities that were lyrical or dreamy to others proved alienating, and that the film's tone could have been matched by simply "taking a walk outside."

Making its North American premiere at the Vancouver International Film Festival, Mid-Afternoon Barks shared the Dragons and Tigers Award with fellow Chinese film Fujian Blue. In rewarding the film, the three-person jury (South Korean filmmaker Jang Sun-woo, Bangkok Post critic Kong Rithdee, and producer Colin McCabe) noted that the film was "witty...and well observed." The film's unique score also did not go unrecognized. Xiao He's work received a nomination for Best Score at the 2nd Asian Film Awards, though it did not win.
