= One Last Dance (2006 film) =

- US film poster
- Traditional Chinese: 茶舞
- Simplified Chinese: 茶舞
- Hanyu Pinyin: Chá Wǔ
- Jyutping: Caa4 Mou2
- Directed by: Max Makowski
- Screenplay by: Max Makowski
- Story by: Max Makowski
- Produced by: Peter Loehr; Titus Ho; Chan Pui-yin
- Starring: Francis Ng; Ti Lung; Vivian Hsu; Harvey Keitel
- Cinematography: Charlie Lam
- Edited by: Lawrence Ang
- Music by: John Swihart
- Production companies: Mediacorp Raintree Pictures; Media Development Authority of Singapore; The Film Bund; Ming Productions; Presto Films
- Distributed by: Mediacorp Raintree Pictures; Golden Village Entertainment
- Release dates: 25 January 2006 (Sundance Film Festival); 22 May 2006 (Cannes Film Festival); 25 August 2006 (Indie World Film Festival); 11 January 2007 (Singapore)
- Running time: 109 minutes
- Country: Singapore
- Languages: Cantonese; Mandarin; English

One Last Dance is a 2006 Singaporean crime film written and directed by Max Makowski and starring Francis Ng, Ti Lung, Vivian Hsu and Harvey Keitel. The film was shown in competition at the 2006 Sundance Film Festival and at the 2006 Cannes Film Festival as part of the "Tous Les Cinemas du Monde Sidebar" before being theatrically released in Singapore on 11 January 2007.

== Plot ==
T (Francis Ng) is Singapore's top class hitman. Every time he receives a red envelope with a name written inside, it means a life will be lost in this world. But he also has his own friendships and romance buried deep inside his heart. Captain (Ti Lung) is T's confidant who plays chess with him by exchanging business cards while Mae (Vivian Hsu), a bartender at TeAmo Bar, is T's beloved.

During a Sunday morning, Mae's olden brother, Ko (Joseph Quek), gives a call to T. Ko was commissioned by his friend Tak to find the son of Italian mafia boss Terrtano (Harvey Keitel). Ko captures three thieves who keep their lips tight and T tortures them to reveal information. After finding Terrtano's son, T kills the three thieves. Unbeknownst to him, one of the thieves is the son of local gang leader, Mr. Sa. Mr. Sa plans to hire T to kill everyone involved in his son's murder, including Ko, Tak, Terranto and even T himself.

== Cast ==
- Francis Ng as T
- Ti Lung as Captain
- Vivian Hsu as Mae
- Harvey Keitel as Terrtano
- Joseph Quek as Ko
- Thomas Lim as Richard
- Sunny Pang as Kai-wing
- Ricky Sim as Nelson
- Wu Kai-Shing as Wong
- Steve Yap as Arthur
- Zhang Xinxiang as Johnathan
- Chen Tianwei as Pui
- Darius Tan as Pei
- Benjamin Yeung as Poi
- Hossan Leong as Treesan
- Zhou Chongqing as Foresan
- Yeo Yann Yann as Wife
- Quan Xi as Mr. Sa
- Dalton Lau as Red, The Trio #1
- Alan Tay as The Trio #2
- Lawrence Wong as The Trio #3
- Salina Chung as Gu
- Koh Tiang-Choon as Cigarette Vendor
- Boo The Dog as Farting Dog
- Bryan Chen as Sergeant
- Daphne Chia as Ballerina
- Taylor Chia as Ballerina
- Paerin Choa as The Bartender
- Gordan Choy as Guard
- Brendon Fernandez as Muslceman
- Fang Rong as Child
- Edric Hsu as Cop
- Thomas Huang as Guard
- Nelson Hui as Child
- Evan Jin as MRT Security Guard
- Koh Ah-Ne as Flower Lady
- Sherry Kuhara as Blond Asian Woman
- Valerie Lee as Ballerina
- Esther Lim as Ballerina
- Natacia Lim as Child
- Shaun Lim as Child
- Nicole Low as Ballerina
- Poon Kee-Chin as Security Guard
- Reinald Tan as Child
- Tay Kim-Hock as Jo
- Fraser Tong as Child
- Beth Toh as Ballerina
- Cookie Wong as Ballet Teacher
- Henry Wong as Cook
- Wong Keng-Chee as Cook
- Raymond Wong as Asian Elvis
- Raymond Yuen as Cook
- Zee Chia as Model
- Zzren as Rookie Cop

== Critical reception ==
Justin Chang of Variety gave the film a positive review praises lead actor Francis Ng's soulful performance and John Swihart's score. Todd Brown of Screen Anarchy praised the film's clever plotting and Ng's performance, but criticizes the film's humor. Michael Feraro of Film Threat rated the film a score of 2/5 stating the film is "thrown together in the most undesirable fashion."

== Accolades ==
Year	Organisation	Category	Nominee(s)	Result	Ref
	8th Newport Beach Film Festival	Jury Award - Best Cinematographer	Charlie Lam	Won	
2006	2006 Sundance Film Festival	Grand Jury Prize - World Cinema - Dramatic	Max Makowski	Nominated	
