= Perfect Life (film) =

- Directed by: Emily Tang
- Produced by: Chow Keung; Jia Zhangke; Li Xiudong
- Starring: Yao Qianyu; Chen Taisheng; Jenny Tse
- Cinematography: Lai Yiu-fai
- Edited by: Chow Keung
- Production company: Xstream Pictures
- Distributed by: Celluloid Dreams
- Release date: August 27, 2008 (Venice)
- Running time: 101 minutes
- Country: China
- Language: Mandarin

Perfect Life (Chinese: 完美生活) is a 2008 Chinese-Hong Kong film by Emily Tang and produced by director Jia Zhangke (who received a co-producer credit) and his company, Xstream Pictures. The film mixes elements of dramatic fiction and documentary film.

== Release and screenings ==
With the backing of the established director, Jia Zhangke, Perfect Life had relatively high-profile screenings at a variety of major international film festivals. Its international premiere was during the 65th Venice Film Festival, as part of the Horizons sidebar." Perfect Life also competed in the Asia-focused Dragons and Tigers program in the 2009 Vancouver International Film Festival, a program which it won due to "the way it captures the harshness of Chinese reality through its fictional protagonist, and for the subtlety of its wonderfully free storytelling," according to the award jury. The film also captured the "Golden Digital Prize" at the Hong Kong International Film Festival.

=== Melbourne controversy ===
Perfect Life was subject of some controversy in 2009 when it was pulled by Jia from the Melbourne International Film Festival, along with Jia's own Cry Me a River. The decision by Jia was due to the Melbourne Film Festival's decision to air a documentary film, The 10 Conditions of Love, about the Uighur advocate, Rebiya Kadeer, who is a highly controversial figure in China. In a letter to the festival's organizers, Jia stated that pulled both to protest against Kadeer's attendance of the event. A third film, the Chinese documentary Petition, was also withdrawn due to the controversy.

== Reception ==
Despite its win at Vancouver, the film received mixed reviews from western critics. Derek Elley of the industry magazine, Variety, called it "rote, anomie-heavy" and ultimately a "step back after Tang's promising 2001 debut, Conjugation. While an Asian-cinema focused academic magazine found the film's mix of drama and documentary elements to be an unsuccessful stylistic choice. A similar review came from The Hollywood Reporter, which also questioned the mix of the documentary film story starring the real Jenny Tse, and the fictional story starring Yao Qianyu, noting that the film fails is that the audience "never quite understand the connection between the two."

The film did have its champions, however. Some found the film's style far more palatable and one reviewer listed it as one of the top independent and foreign films from 2008.
