= All Apologies (film) =

- Film poster
- Directed by: Emily Tang
- Written by: Han Jie; Emily Tang; Dong Fang
- Produced by: Yang Jian; Chow Keung
- Cinematography: Lai Yiu-fai
- Edited by: Chow Keung; Baek Seung-han
- Music by: Roger Lin
- Release date: September 26, 2012 (San Sebastián)
- Running time: 89 minutes
- Country: China
- Language: Mandarin

All Apologies (愛的替身 Ai De Ti Shen) is a 2012 Chinese drama film directed by Emily Tang. It had its premiere on September 26, 2012 at the San Sebastián International Film Festival.

== Plot ==
The film is set in Guilin, Guangxi.

== Cast ==
- Cheng Taishen as Cheng Yonggui
- Yang Shuting as Li Qiaoyu
- Liang Jing as Yunzhen
- Gao Jin as He Man
- Ge Ge
- Qu Yi as Dazhuang
- Tang Xi
- Chen Bing as Huang
- Yang Shu
- Zou Xi as Tie Niu
- Xiao Ji'nan
- Gao Yi'nan

== Reception ==
At the 2012 San Sebastián International Film Festival the film was in the Official Selection, in competition for the Golden Shell. It was shown in the A Window on Asian Cinema section at the 17th Busan International Film Festival.

On Film Business Asia, Derek Elley gave the film a grade of 6 out of 10, calling it an "affecting story of surrogate motherhood".
