= Feng Yan (director) =

Chinese filmmaker

Feng Yan is a Chinese independent documentary film maker. She was raised in Tianjin and attended Tianjin Foreign Studies University, graduating in 1984 with a degree in Japanese literature. Yan later moved to Japan in 1988 where she studied agricultural economy at Kyoto University. In 1992, Yan worked as a translator in Tokyo where she had the opportunity to learn about documentary film.

Most notably, her film Bing'ai won the Ogawa Shinsuke Prize at the 2007 Yamagata International Documentary Film Festival. The film also won first prize at the 2008 Punto de Vista International Documentary Film Festival.

== Career ==
In 1993, while attending The Yamagata International Documentary Film Festival as an audience member, Feng Yan was exposed to many documentaries where she got to know the masterpieces and movies of Shinsuke Ogawa. After attending the film festival, she translated the book Shinsuke Ogawa’s World (《收割电影》——小川绅介的世界) into Chinese and published it with Yuan-Liou Publishing Company, simultaneously beginning her documenting practice. In 1994, Feng Yan began to shoot a large number of documentary works using Super 8mm films and DV. It was also at this time that she stepped into the three gorges reservoir area to research and film for the first time. She finishes her first film The Dream of the Yangtze River《长江之梦》（1997）in 1997, which is selected into New Asian Currents. She then returned to The Yamagata International Documentary Film Festival, this time as a writer.

In 2002, Feng Yan went back to the village she had photographed on the edge of the Yangtze River. The changes of people and their lives deeply touched her. This time, she focused on four women, and after five years, Feng Yan edited one story about one of the women into a film called Bingai. The documentary describes Zhang Bingai's life living in the Three Gorges reservoir area as an ordinary peasant woman who has lived a tough life because of her ill husband. However, despite the hardships, Zhang Bing'ai is full of hope for the future because her son is the only child in the village who has been admitted to the county's key high school.

Feng Yan brought this documentary to The Yamagata International Documentary Film Festival and won the Award of Shinsuke Ogawa and Community Film. The documentary also won the Best Picture in the Punto de Vista International Documentary Film Festival, the Outstanding Record Award in the 4th China Documentary Film Festival, and many other honors. In 2007, Feng Yan made a return visit to her characters from the Three Gorges reservoir. She is currently preparing for her next documentary - The Women Along the Bank of the Yangtze River《长江边的女人》, which will weave the stories of four women in a span of ten years in the Three Gorges to depict their ordinary lives as well as their ideals and real life dilemmas under the background of immigration.

Feng Yan now lives and works in Beijing, and continues to film documentaries. She is also a lecturer at Li Xianxian Cinema School. She truly enjoys creating documentaries, writing in her blog, “In this era of chaos, it is indeed a supreme blessing for me as a participant to record the lives of myself and the people around me as a proof that they have once lived.”

== Works ==
=== Films ===
- Going to School (1994)《上学》（1994）
- Far Home《归乡路迢迢》（1997）
- The Dream of the Yangtze River《长江之梦》（1997）
- Xiao’s Spring《小肖的春天》（1998）
- Bing'ai《秉爱》（2007）
- The Women Along the Bank of the Yangtze River《长江边的女人》(ongoing)

=== Translations ===
- Shinsuke Ogawa’s World《收割电影》——小川绅介的世界

== Awards and honors ==
=== The Dream of the Yangtze River《长江之梦》（1997） ===
- Excellence Award in the First Taiwan International Documentary Festival, 1998
- New Asian Currents in The Yamagata International Documentary Film Festival, 1997
- The 22nd Hong Kong International Film Festival
- Berlin Anthropological International Film Festival
- The 1st Yunnan Multi Culture Visual Festival

=== Bingai《秉爱》(2007) ===
- Vancouver International Film Festival
- Pusan International Film Festival
- Vienna International Film Festival
- Outstanding Record Award in the 4th China Documentary Film Festival
- Li Xianting Film Fund
- Award of Shinsuke Ogawa and Community Film in New Asian Currents in The Yamagata International Documentary Film Festival
- Best Picture in Punto de Vista International Documentary Film Festival
- Silver Balloon Award in The Festival of the Three Continents
- Filmer A Tout Prix On Tour
- Outstanding Documentary and Humanitarian Award in The 32nd Hong Kong International Film Festival
- Nominated in the Movie of the Year 2007 by Southern Weekend
