= Liao Fan =

Chinese actor

- 廖凡
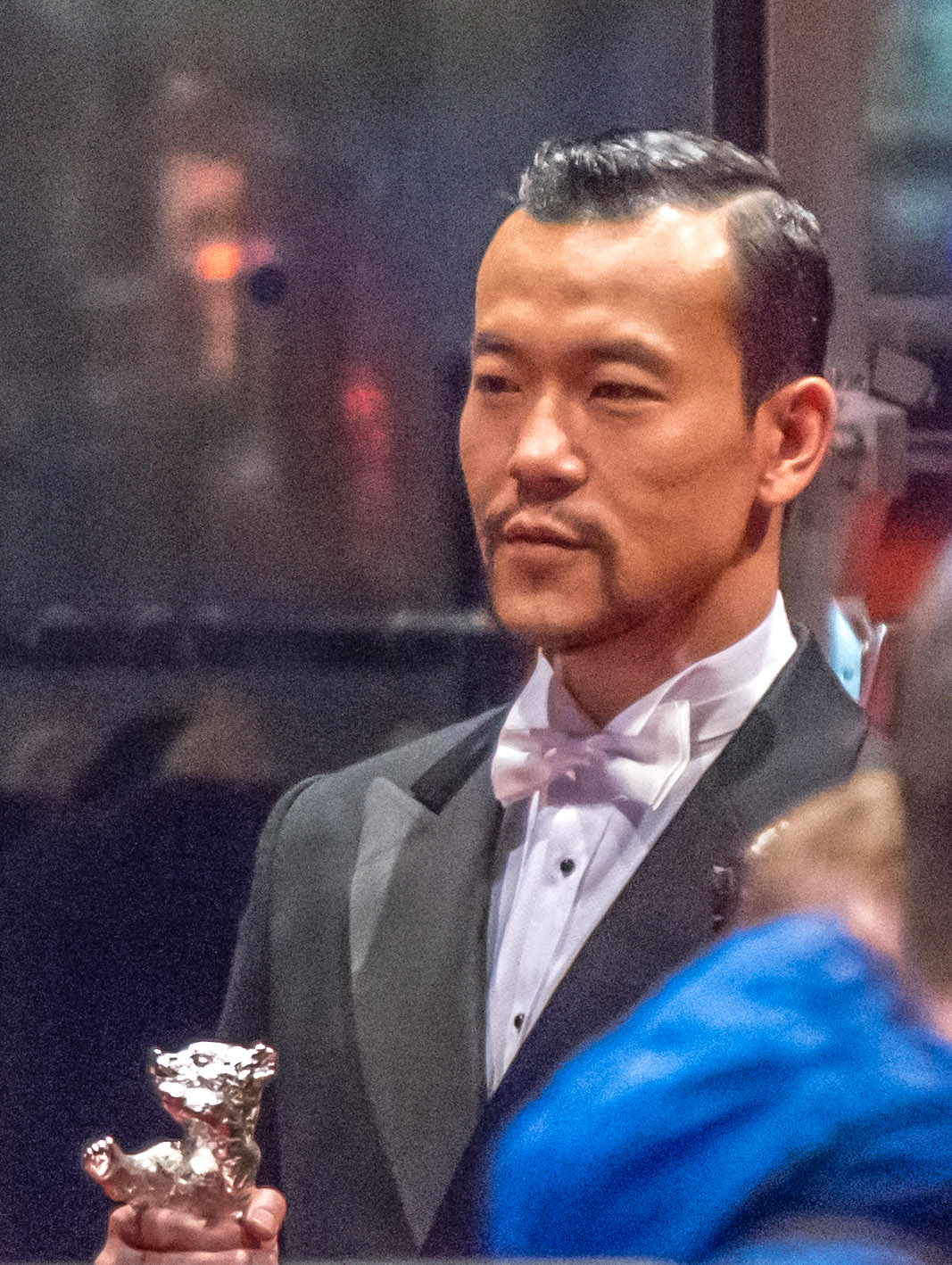
- Liao with the Silver Bear for Best Actor in Berlin 2014
- Born: February 14, 1974 (age 52); Changsha, Hunan, China
- Education: Shanghai Theatre Academy
- Occupation: Actor
- Years active: 1980–present
- Partner: Huo Xin (霍昕)
- Parent: Liao Bingyan (廖丙炎)

Chinese name
- Chinese: 廖凡
Transcriptions
Standard Mandarin
- Hanyu Pinyin: Liào Fán

Liao Fan (Chinese: 廖凡; born 14 February 1974) is a Chinese film and theatre actor. He is a graduate of Shanghai Theatre Academy. In February 2014 he won the Silver Bear for Best Actor at the 64th Berlin International Film Festival, for his performance in the film Black Coal, Thin Ice (directed by Diao Yinan).

== Filmography ==
=== Film ===
Year	English title	Chinese title	Role	Notes/Ref.
2001	Chicken Poets	像鸡毛一样飞	Chen Xiaoyang	
2004	Baober in Love	恋爱中的宝贝	Li Yang	
2004	The Game of Killing	天黑请闭眼	Da Wei	
2005	Gimme Kudos	求求你，表扬我	Tan Wei	
2006	Green Hat	绿帽子		
2006	Curiosity Kills the Cat	好奇害死猫	Security guard	
2007	Getting Home	落叶归根	Police	Scenes cut from film
2007	Assembly	集结号	Jiao Dapeng	
2007		沉默的较量	Gu Zi	
2008	Ocean Flame	一半海水，一半火焰	Wang Yao	
2010	Let the Bullets Fly	让子弹飞	Lao San	
2010	If You Are the One 2	非诚勿扰2	Jian Guo	
2011	The Founding of a Party	建党伟业	Zhu De	
2011	Love on Credit	幸福额度	Jiang Cheng	
2012	CZ12	十二生肖	David	
2014	Black Coal, Thin Ice	白日焰火	Zhang Zili	
2014	A Bed Affair 2	床上关系2	Zheng Zhong	
2015	Only You	命中注定	Feng Dali	
2015	The Final Master	师父	Chen Shi	
2017	Guilty of Mind	心理罪	Tai Wei	
2018	Hidden Man	邪不压正	Zhu Tilong	
2018	Ash Is Purest White	江湖儿女	Guo Bin	
2019	Savages	雪暴		
2019	The Wild Goose Lake	南方车站的聚会		

=== Television series ===
Year	English title	Chinese title	Role	Notes/Ref.
1995		北京深秋的故事	Lao Xie	
1997		三坊七巷	Ma Zai	
1998	Cherish Our Love Forever	将爱情进行到底	Yu Lin	
2000	Deathly Encounter	致命邂逅	Ah Dan	
2000		绝路	Lu Xueping	
2001	Love Story in Shanghai	像雾像雨又像风	Wu Boping	
2001		锵锵儿女到江湖	Yan Yichun	
2001	Love in Sunshine	爱在阳光灿烂时	Pan Xiaoxing	
2002		相约青春	Ling Hui	
2003	Farewell Vancouver	别了,温哥华	Si Mabo	
2004	Love Me	好想好想谈恋爱	Ma Xiaodong	
2005		风吹云动星不动	Xiao Kun	
2005		录像带	Policeman	
2006		随风飞扬	Mu Feng	
2007	Marry for Love	为爱结婚	Bai Ju	
2007		大院子女	Liu Shuanglin	
2008	A Poem for the Oak	相思树	Dongfang Lingxiao	
2009	Angry Angel	愤怒的天使	Zhang Dongyang	
2009	Shanghai of Bourne	谍影重重之上海	Yan Tian	
2009	The Line	生死线	Ouyang Shanjing	
2010	Legend of the Wind	风声传奇	Lao Pan	
2011	Biography of Sun Tzu	孙子大传	Zhuan Zhu	
2013	Jinan City is our Hometown	我们这拨人	Wang Daliang	
2013	Woman Gang	女人帮	Gao Ming	
2013	Meng's Place	海上孟府	Lang Tou	
2014	All Quiet in Peking	北平无战事	Liang Jinglun	
2018	Lost in 1949	脱身	Guo Xuhui	
2020	The Long Night	沉默的真相		

== Awards ==
Year	Award	Category	Nominated work	Ref.
2005	18th Singapore International Film Festival	Best Actor	Green Hat	
2014	64th Berlin International Film Festival	Silver Bear for Best Actor	Black Coal, Thin Ice	
2014	23rd Shanghai Film Critics Awards	Best Actor	Black Coal, Thin Ice	
2015	9th Asian Film Awards	Best Actor	Black Coal, Thin Ice	
2015	6th China Film Director's Guild Awards	Best Actor	Black Coal, Thin Ice	
