= Eagle Flute =

- Directed by: Tao Jiang
- Written by: Tao Jiang
- Starring: Luoeryi Querjian; Danba Xiamu
- Cinematography: Tao Jiang
- Edited by: Tao Jiang
- Release date: 2009
- Country: China
- Language: Chinese

Eagle Flute is a 2009 Chinese film directed by Tao Jiang.

The film concerns a young Chinese girl's adoption by a nomadic Tibetan family and her quest to find her birth parents. The film was screened at the 2009 Monaco Charity Film Festival, where it won the Special Jury Prize.
