= Lala's Gun =

- Directed by: Ning Jingwu
- Written by: Ning Jingwu
- Produced by: Ning Jingqu; Li Zhangjun
- Starring: Wang Jishuai; Shi Mingma; Gun Dangyuan
- Cinematography: Wu Lixiao
- Edited by: Jia Cuiping
- Production company: Beijing Spring Thunder Films
- Distributed by: 3 Dots Entertainment
- Release date: 24 September 2008 (Beijing)
- Running time: 103 minutes
- Country: China
- Language: Hmong

Lala's Gun (Chinese: 滚拉拉的枪; pinyin: Gun Lala De Qiang) is a 2008 film about the coming-of-age of a young boy as a member of China's Miao ethnic minority. The film was written and directed by Ning Jingwu and stars Wang Jishuai in the title role. Lala's Guns' international sales were picked up by the Taiwan-based 3 Dots Entertainment. The film's world showed at the 2009 Berlin International Film Festival as part of its Generation 14plus program.

== Plot ==
Lala's Gun is the story of a boy from the village of Biasha in Congjiang County, where resides a branch of Miao minority. As part of the village's tradition, every boy upon reaching the age of fifteen was to receive a gun from his father as a symbol of reaching manhood. Lala, however, was raised by his grandmother after being abandoned by his father followed by his mother's death. As his 15th birthday approached, Lala departed Biasha and started a journey of searching the father he hadn't seen for years.

== Reception ==
The film's limited exposure to international markets has garnered it some above average reviews. Though many western critics have faulted the film for its simplistic story, even while praising the film's lush visuals and nuanced portrayal of the Miao people. Derek Elley of Variety, for example, notes that what the film lacks in narrative, it makes up for in its "verismo detail".
