= Ji Chen =

American nuclear physicist

Ji Chen is an American nuclear physicist who invented an image analysis software application.

== Biography ==
Ji Chen got his PhD from the Georgia Institute of Technology in 2003 and the same year was employed by Emory University where he invented an image analysis software program which can automatically calculate the prognosis of heart failure in patients by using left-ventricular dyssynchrony. In 2006 he was awarded the GE Healthcare Research Award from the American Society of Nuclear Cardiology and in 2009 got a grant from both the National Institute of Health and National Heart, Lung, and Blood Institute. Currently he has written 40 articles and held 28 lectures.
