= Ocean Flame =

2008 Hong Kong film by Liu Fendou

- Film poster
- Traditional Chinese: 一半海水，一半火燄
- Simplified Chinese: 一半海水，一半火焰
- Hanyu Pinyin: Yíbàn Haǐshuǐ, Yíbàn Huǒyàn
- Directed by: Liu Fendou
- Screenplay by: Liu Fendou; Ou Jiabao
- Based on: Ocean Flame by Wang Shuo
- Produced by: Simon Yam
- Starring: Liao Fan; Monica Mok
- Cinematography: Chen Chuqiang; Chen Ying
- Edited by: Kwong Chi-Leung
- Music by: Ronald Ng
- Production company: Filmko Entertainment Limited
- Distributed by: Filmko Films Distribution
- Release dates: 11 September 2008 (Hong Kong); 28 November 2008 (Taiwan)
- Running time: 98 minutes
- Country: Hong Kong
- Languages: Mandarin; Cantonese

Ocean Flame is a 2008 Hong Kong romantic comedy film directed by Liu Fendou and starring Liao Fan and Monica Mok. The plot is based on Wang Shuo's novel of the same title. It was released on 11 September 2008.

== Plot ==
The film tells the story of a punk's entanglements with a pure young girl.

== Cast ==
=== Main cast ===
- Liao Fan as Wang Yao
- Monica Mok as Li Chuan

=== Other cast ===
- Nina Paw as Li Chuan's mother
- Susanna Kwan as Wang Yao's mother
- Simon Yam as Laozhang
- Derek Tsang as Third Brother's assistant
- Suet Lam as Gunzi
- Wong Man Shing as Gunzi's assistant
- Him Law as Li Chuan's brother
- Hui Siu Hung as Mr. Luo
- Ha Da as Lü Yan
- Ma Gaoqiang as a whoremaster
- Zhao Huinan as Wei Ning
- Lawrence Cheng as a whoremaster
- Hai Yitian as Zheng Zhong
- Ka-Yan Leung as Third Brother
- Zhou Chuchu as Xiaobai
- Koo Fung as Waiter

== Reception ==
The film earned critical acclaim and received nominations at the 45th Golden Horse Awards. The film also was shortlisted for the 61st Cannes Film Festival and the 33rd Toronto International Film Festival.

== Nominations and awards ==
Year	Award	Category	Result	Notes
2008	Golden Horse Award	Best Drama	Nominated	
2008	Golden Horse Award	Best Actor	Nominated	
2008	Golden Horse Award	Best Actress	Nominated	
2008	Golden Horse Award	Best Cinematography	Nominated	
2008	Golden Horse Award	Best Art Design	Nominated	
