= Dragons and Tigers Award =

Film award

VIFF Dragons and Tigers Award for Young Cinema was an award from the Vancouver International Film Festival for a film director from the Asia-Pacific region. Presented to a film judged as the best film by an emerging director within the festival's Dragons and Tigers program for Asian cinema, it awarded a creative and innovative film, made early in the director's career, which had not yet won significant international recognition.

First created in 1994, the award was discontinued after 2013. It was replaced with a general Best New Director Award, open to all emerging international filmmakers with films screening in any festival program.

Nominated films were selected by film scholar and critic Tony Rayns.

== Award winners ==
Year	Film	Director	Country of origin
1994	This Window Is Yours	Tomoyuki Furumaya	Japan
1995	Goldfish	Wu Di	China
1995	Maborosi	Koreeda Hirokazu	Japan
1996	The Day a Pig Fell into the Well	Hong Sang-soo	South Korea
1996	Rain Clouds over Wushan	Zhang Ming	China
1997	Green Fish	Lee Chang-dong	South Korea
1998	Xiao Wu	Jia Zhangke	China/Hong Kong
1999	Nana/No-Go	Hayakawa Wataru	Japan
2000	Tears of the Black Tiger	Wisit Sasanatieng	Thailand
2001	Mirror Image	Hsiao Ya-Chuan	Taiwan
2002	Shanghai Panic	Andrew Y-S Cheng	China
2003	Uniform	Diao Yinan	China
2004	The Soup, One Morning	Takahashi Izumi	Japan
2005	Oxhide	Liu Jiayin	China
2006	Todo Todo Terros	John Torres	The Philippines
2007	Fujian Blue	Weng Shouming	China
2007	Mid-Afternoon Barks	Zhang Yuedong	China
2008	Perfect Life	Emily Tang	Hong Kong/China
2009	Eighteen	Jang Kun-jae	South Korea
2010	Good Morning to the World!	Hirohara Saturo	Japan
2011	The Sun-Beaten Path	Sonthar Gyal	China
2012	Emperor Visits the Hell	Li Luo	China
2013	Anatomy of a Paperclip	Ikeda Akira	Japan
