= Fujian Blue =

- Film poster
- Directed by: Weng Shouming
- Written by: Weng Shouming; Chen Tao; Lin Yile
- Produced by: Weng Xiuping; Kondo Teiko; Lin Fan
- Starring: Zhu Xiaopeng; Wang Ruiyin; Luo Jin
- Cinematography: Hai Tao; Shang Yi; Wang Yan
- Edited by: Zeng Jian
- Production company: Fantasy Pictures
- Distributed by: Fantasy Pictures
- Release dates: 1 October 2007 (Vancouver); 5 October 2007 (Pusan)
- Running time: 87 minutes
- Country: China
- Languages: Mandarin; Hokkienese

Fujian Blue (simplified Chinese: 金壁辉煌; traditional Chinese: 金壁輝煌; pinyin: Jīn Bì Hūihúang; Pe̍h-ōe-jī: Kim-piah-hui-hông) is a 2007 Chinese film directed by Weng Shouming (Robin Weng). The film is Weng's first and is composed of two separate but linked stories entitled "The Neon Knights" and "At Home at Sea." The film touches on a number of controversial topics including juvenile delinquency, human trafficking, and drug use, which the film implies are the result of increasing influence of the West.

Starring primarily non-professionals, Fujian Blue was produced by several independent companies in China and abroad, including Fantasy Pictures based in Beijing.

The film won a Dragons and Tigers Award from the 2007 Vancouver International Film Festival, an award it shared with Zhang Yuedong's Mid-Afternoon Barks.

== Plot ==
Fujian Blue takes place in the southeastern coastal province of Fujian (located across the straits from Taiwan). The film follows several characters in two separate but linked tales in the aftermath of the Communist government's decision to open the province up to the outside world in the 1980s.

The first tale, entitled "The Neon Knights" follows the youth Amerika (Zhu Xiaoping) who lives in Fuqing. Amerika works for Roppongi (Zhuang Jiangjie), who operates a blackmailing ring that targets lonely housewives who have committed adultery while their husbands are away. Unbeknownst to Amerika, Amerika's mother (Wang Ruiyin) is also involved in crime, as an agent for the smuggler Czech (Gao Qing). Upset that his mother will not pay for his college education, Amerika makes her his next blackmailing target, but his plan goes awry and he is forced to seek refuge on Pingtan Island.

The second tale, entitled "At Home at Sea" takes place on that same island and follows another youth in Roppongi's gang named Dragon (Luo Jin). Dragon, too, has fled to Pingtan after stabbing a man earlier. He had turned to crime in order to pay for the loans taken out to have his brother illegally smuggled out of the country. With nowhere to turn, Amerika gives Dragon some money, and he must decide whether to use it to emigrate himself, or to help his family.

== Cast ==
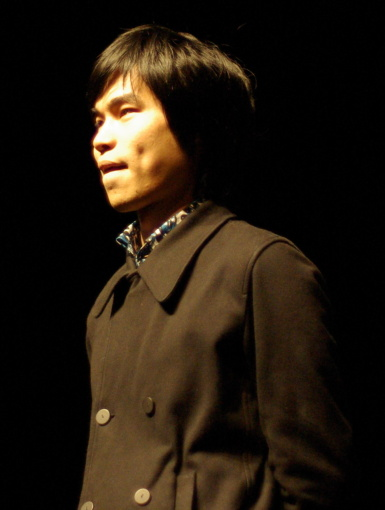
The director Robin Weng in the Deauville Asian Film Festival 2008

- Zhu Xiaoping as Amerika, a delinquent youth living with his single mother in Fujian province. Bored and unsupervised, Amerika has become part of a gang who seek out "remittance widows" to blackmail after filming their trysts with lovers.
- Wang Ruiyin as Amerika's mother, who is herself an agent of the human trafficker "The Czech." One critic specially praised Wang's portrayal of Amerika's mother as effectively capturing a character who was both a devout Christian and also a criminal in human trafficking.
- Luo Jin as Dragon, another youth in Amerika's gang. Unlike his companions, however, Dragon commits crimes in order to help support his family. He dreams of escaping China, however, to follow in the footsteps of his brother who has already illegally emigrated to Ireland.
- Zhang Jianjie as Roppongi, the leader of Amerika's blackmail ring.
- Gao Qing as The Czech, Amerika's mother's boss and a major figure in Fujian's human smuggling underground.

== Reception ==
Fujian Blue remains obscure outside of the film festival circuit, due in part to what some critics saw as the films' rough aesthetics. Western critics have nevertheless been kind to the film so far. Richard Kuipers of Variety, who saw the film at the 2007 Pusan International Film Festival, argued that the film was uneven but a strong debut from first-time director Weng. The Hollywood Reporter who reviewed the film at the 2008 Deauville Asian Film Festival found Fujian Blue's non-professional cast and "interesting use of location" worthy of praise. Both critics also noted the film's social commentary, with the latter review stating that Weng accurately captures how "[c]rime and addiction appear to be ruining the country's social fabric." However, like Variety, The Hollywood Reporter was less optimistic regarding the film's ability to reach a broader audience.

=== Awards ===
- 2007 Vancouver International Film Festival
  - Dragons and Tigers Award for Young East Asian Cinema (shared with Mid-Afternoon Barks)
