= Gao Yuanyuan =

Chinese actress and model

- 高圆圆
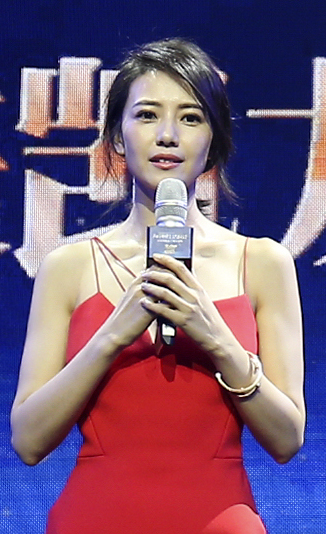
- Gao in 2016
- Born: 5 October 1979 (age 47); Beijing, China
- Education: China Institute of Industrial Relations
- Occupations: Actress, Model
- Years active: 1997–present
- Spouse: Mark Chao (m. 2014)
- Children: Rhea Chao (daughter)

Chinese name
- Traditional Chinese: 高圓圓
- Simplified Chinese: 高圆圆
Transcriptions
Standard Mandarin
- Hanyu Pinyin: Gāo Yuányuán

Gao Yuanyuan (Chinese: 高圆圆; pinyin: Gāo yuányuán, born 5 October 1979) is a Chinese actress. She gained attention in 2000 for appearing in a lozenge commercial and achieved her early success with the role of Zhou Zhiruo in the wuxia series The Heaven Sword and Dragon Saber (2003). Her other notable works include the films Shanghai Dreams (2005), City of Life and Death (2009), Don't Go Breaking My Heart (2011), Caught in the Web (2012), But Always (2014), as well as the television series We Get Married (2013).

She ranked 64th on Forbes China Celebrity 100 list in 2013, 40th in 2014, 76th in 2015, and 86th in 2017.

== Career ==
Gao Yuanyuan was born in Beijing and graduated from China Institute of Industrial Relations. Gao entered the entertainment industry in 1996. Gao, unlike other mainland Chinese actresses, did not graduate from any drama academic institutions. Rather, she started acting in a television commercial for Meadow Gold ice-cream after being spotted on the street at Beijing's Wangfujing shopping district.

Gao made her debut in the 1997 film Spicy Love Soup. Thereafter, she starred in Beijing Bicycle (2001), which won the Silver Bear at the Berlin International Film Festival and romance film Spring Subway (2002). She rose to fame in 2003 for her role as Zhou Zhiruo in the television adaptation of Louis Cha's The Heaven Sword and Dragon Saber.

Gao made inroads into the international market with the film Shanghai Dreams (2005), directed by Wang Xiaoshuai, which won the Prix de Jury prize at the Cannes Film Festival. She was then picked by Jackie Chan to star in the action comedy movie Rob-B-Hood (2006). Chan has characterized Gao as having the "freshest look and chaste spirit no Hong Kong actress could approach".

Gao next starred in the romance film Love in the City (2007) opposite Shawn Yue, where she plays a deaf-mute kindergarten teacher. Her performance won her the Newcomer Award at the 11th Golden Phoenix Awards.

Gao was then cast in City of Life and Death (2009), directed by Lu Chuan and based on the events of the Nanjing Massacre. Departing from her "girl-next-door" image, Gao played a middle-aged teacher who helped Nanjing people survive the horrors of the Japanese atrocities in 1937. Gao called the role a "turning point" in her career, stating that she had never started taking acting seriously until she worked on the film. City of Life and Death won the top prize at the 2009 San Sebastian Film Festival.

In 2010, Gao starred alongside Korean actor Jung Woo-sung in the romantic film A Season of Good Rain directed by Hur Jin-ho, as well as the omnibus romance drama film Driverless. The following year, she starred in Johnnie To's romantic comedy Don't Go Breaking My Heart alongside Daniel Wu.

In 2012, Gao starred in Chen Kaige's Caught in the Web where she plays a young woman who commits suicide after she becomes embroiled in a social media controversy. The film was especially popular among young viewers, drawing more than six million viewers and praise from critics.

Gao returned to television in 2013 with the television series We Get Married, playing a "leftover" (Sheng nü) unmarried woman who gets entangled with a man who has a phobia of marriage. The series was a commercial hit, and was the highest rated drama of 2013. For her performance, Gao won the Best Actress Award at the 18th Beijing Chunyan Awards. Gao reprised her role in the film adaptation of the drama.

Gao then starred alongside Nicholas Tse in the romantic film But Always (2014). She won the Best Foreign Actress Award at the 52nd Grand Bell Awards.

In 2017, after a two-year hiatus, Gao acted in Juno Mak's film Sons of the Neon Night, which was shelved until its release in 2025.

== Other activities ==
Gao was a torch-bearer in the Nanjing leg of the torch relay for the 2008 Olympics in Beijing.

In 2012, Gao became the first Chinese brand ambassador for French luxury house Longchamp.

Gao was appointed as California's tourism ambassador to China in 2013. She was picked as she "embodies the California brand and spirit and will share her authentic passion for California with the Chinese public, inspiring their California dreams".

In 2020, Gao became the brand ambassador for Michael Kors.

Since 2021, Gao became the brand spokesperson for French high-end jeweller Chaumet.

== Personal life ==
Gao married Taiwanese actor Mark Chao in 2014, after collaborating in the film Caught in the Web. They had a daughter, Rhea Chao, born in June 2019, one month after announcing that Gao was pregnant. Gao has been a vegetarian since 2009.

== Filmography ==
=== Film ===
Year	English title	Chinese title	Role	Notes	Ref.
1997	Spicy Love Soup	爱情麻辣烫	He Ling		
2001	Beijing Bicycle	十七岁的单车	Xiaoxiao		
2002	Spring Subway	开往春天的地铁	Tian'ai		
2005	Shanghai Dreams	青红	Wu Qinghong		
2006	Rob-B-Hood	宝贝计划	Melody		
2007	Love in the City	男才女貌	Qin Xiaoyou		
2007	Unfinished Girl	第三个人	Xiao Ke		
2008	In Love We Trust	左右	School teacher	Cameo	
2008	xXx:A Forbidden Love Story	xXx：被禁锢的爱		Short film	
2009	City of Life and Death	南京！南京！	Jiang Shuyun		
2009	A Season of Good Rain	好雨时节	Wu Yue (May)	Korean-Chinese co-production	
2010	The Love of Three Smile	三笑之才子佳人	Top Female Scholar	Cameo	
2010	Ocean Heaven	海洋天堂	Da Fu's mother	Cameo	
2010	Driverless	无人驾驶	Xiao Yun		
2010	Color Me Love	爱出色	Herself	Cameo	
2011	Don't Go Breaking My Heart	单身男女	Cheng Zixin		
2012	Romancing in Thin Air	高海拔之恋II	Ding Yuanyuan		
2012	Caught in the Web	搜索	Ye Lanqiu		
2013	Blind Detective	盲探	Ting Ting		
2014	But Always	一生一世	An Ran		
2014	Don't Go Breaking My Heart 2	单身男女2	Cheng Zixin		
2015	Let's Get Married	咱们结婚吧	Ye Wenwen		
2024	G for Gap	走走停停	Feng Liuliu		
2025	Sons of the Neon Night	风林火山	Therapist		
2026	All The Good Eyes	森中有林	Wang Xiuyi		

=== Television series ===
Year	English title	Chinese title	Role	Notes/Ref.
1998		实习生的故事	Gao Fei	
1998		找不着北	Jiang Xin	
1999		咱老百姓	Yu Qian	
2003	The Heaven Sword and Dragon Saber	倚天屠龙记	Zhou Zhiruo	
2003	The Adventures of Di Renjie	护国良相狄仁杰	Pan Yu	
2003		准点出击	Huang Li	
2004		你在微笑我却哭了	Shen Xiao	
2004		海的誓言	Ye Yu	
2004		烟花三月	Shen Wan	
2004		爱与梦飞翔	Hongjie	Cameo
2004	Miracle Healers	神医侠侣	Qinzi	
2005	The Royal Swordsmen	天下第一	Liusheng Piaoxu	
2005	The Prince of Qin, Li Shimin	秦王李世民	Yang Ruoxi	
2007	Love No Regrets	爱无悔	Gao Mingyue	
2009	The Qin Empire	大秦帝国	Bai Xue	
2013	We Get Married	咱们结婚吧	Yang Tao	
2013	The Demi-Gods and Semi-Devils	天龙八部	Li Biyun	
2021	Dreams and Glory	光荣与梦想	Soong Mei-ling	
2022	Perfect Couple	完美伴侣	Chen Shan	

== Theater ==
Year	English title	Chinese title	Role	Notes/Ref.
2007	Glamorous Encounter	艳遇	Lin Momo	
2008	Hamlet 1990	哈姆雷特1990	Ophelia	

== Awards and nominations ==
Year	Nominated work	Award	Category	Result	Ref.
2007	Love in the City	11th Golden Phoenix Awards	Newcomer Award	Won	
2008	Rob-B-Hood	29th Hundred Flowers Awards	Best Actress	Nominated	
2012	Don't Go Breaking My Heart	31st Hong Kong Film Awards	Best Actress	Nominated	
2012	Don't Go Breaking My Heart	12th Chinese Film Media Awards	Most Anticipated Actress	Nominated	
2013	Caught in the Web	4th China Film Director's Guild Awards	Best Actress	Nominated	
2014	Let's Get Married	20th Shanghai Television Festival	Best Actress	Nominated	
2014	But Always	6th Macau International Movie Festival	Best Actress	Nominated	
2015	Let's Get Married	18th Chunyan Awards	Best Actress	Won	
2015	—N/a	52nd Grand Bell Awards	Best Foreign Actress	Won	
2016	We Get Married	27th China TV Golden Eagle Awards	Audience's Choice for Actress	Nominated	
