= Oxhide II =

- Film poster
- Simplified Chinese: 牛皮贰
- Hanyu Pinyin: niú pí èr
- Directed by: Liu Jiayin
- Written by: Liu Jiayin
- Starring: Liu Jiayin; Jia Huifen; Liu Zaiping
- Cinematography: Liu Jiayin
- Release date: 21 May 2009 (Cannes)
- Running time: 132 minutes
- Country: China
- Language: Mandarin

Oxhide II (Chinese: 牛皮贰; pinyin: niú pí èr) is a 2009 independent Chinese film by Liu Jiayin. It is a sequel to Oxhide (2005), Liu's directorial debut. Like the first film, Oxhide II portrays the director and her family as they go about their lives in their apartment.

== Plot ==
Set in their apartment in Beijing, Liu and her parents play versions of themselves as they talk, cook, and eat shǔi jiǎo (soup dumplings) at their kitchen table over the course of a night. The film takes place in a single room in real time, with the camera focused on the table rather than the people.

== Production ==
Liu used a consumer-grade Digital Betacam video camera to shoot Oxhide II. The frame was masked using construction paper to a 2.35:1 aspect ratio; though the wide CinemaScope ratio is typically used to emphasize vast landscapes, Liu chose it because she simply "wanted to see less". The camera is at table level for most of the film, although its angle and height varies. As a result of the camera's placement and aspect ratio, the audience only sees the family's hands working at the table unless a character leans down into frame.

The film is composed of nine static shots, with each long take lasting from five to 20 minutes. After every shot change, the perspective moves 45 degrees clockwise around the table, so that the final shot ends in the same position as the first.

== Release ==
The film premiered on 21 May 2009 at the 62nd Cannes Film Festival as part of its Directors' Fortnight program. It was also an official selection at the Locarno International Film Festival and Vancouver International Film Festival in 2009, International Film Festival Rotterdam in 2010, and San Sebastián International Film Festival in 2011.

== Reception ==
Oxhide II received positive reviews from critics. Writing for Cinema Scope, Andrea Picard said, "Even without the surprise factor that helped make Oxhide a festival cause célèbre, the more technically accomplished Oxhide II proves that Liu's arte povera aesthetic is capable of a seemingly infinite number of variations. ... Liu’s films evince a carefully calibrated yet warmly sensual sound and image construction, a droll humanism, and, ultimately, a feisty hopefulness that mark them as extraordinarily valuable in a world that purports to be incapable of taking its time."

Film historian David Bordwell called it "a consistently warm, engaging—I don’t hesitate to say entertaining—film that is also a demonstration of how a simple form, patiently pursued, can yield unpredictable rewards. ... Oxhide II is unpretentiously inventive, quietly virtuosic."

In a 2024 retrospective, Alex Fields of metafilm preferred it to the first film: "Liu is a master of exact compositions that reveal their clever precision and simple beauty over the course of long takes. A new person enters the frame and alters its fundamental balance, an object stationary for several minutes is moved or comes into use, and the image is rigorously recomposed in real time. ... The film leans into the demonstrative power of form, which for me is what makes it the more singular and greater of the two." On the other hand, Jay Weissberg of Variety found it less original than the first: "For most viewers this audience tester will merely spur heavy-duty ankling. ... The mildly amusing self-deprecatory humor she evinced in Oxhide still shows, but without stylistic development the experiment’s second outing feels even more hollow."

== Sequels ==
A followup, Oxhide III, was announced in 2010. Liu has stated she is still working on the screenplay: "There will be more camera angles in Oxhide III. The shots will be very different from the first two. I will bring out more of the characters’ inner thoughts and feelings." As of 2025, it has not yet been released.

Liu intends to make eight total films in the Oxhide series, with Oxhide IV and V in the planning stages. One of the later parts may be a children's film.
