= Dream Weavers: Beijing 2008 =

2008 Chinese documentary film

- Film poster
- Directed by: Jun Gu
- Written by: Jun Gu
- Produced by: Jun Gu
- Cinematography: Luo Ling; Zhang Weimin
- Edited by: Feng Wen
- Music by: Hao Jian; Shigeru Umebayashi; Xiao Ding
- Production companies: Central Newsreel and Documentary Film Studio
- Distributed by: The Criterion Collection (US DVD)
- Release date: 28 June 2008
- Running time: 94 minutes
- Country: China
- Languages: Mandarin; English

Dream Weavers: Beijing 2008 is a 2008 Chinese documentary film directed by Jun Gu. The film, which focuses on Beijing's preparation for the 2008 Summer Olympics, was selected as China's entry for the Best Foreign Language Film at the 81st Academy Awards. The film received the Outstanding Achievement in Documentary Filmmaking at the 2009 Newport Beach Film Festival.
