= The Case =

- Film poster
- Traditional Chinese: 箱子
- Simplified Chinese: 箱子
- Hanyu Pinyin: Xiāng zi
- Directed by: Wang Fen
- Written by: Wang Fen; Zhang Chen
- Produced by: Lola Zhang
- Starring: Wu Gang; Wu Yujuan; Wang Sifei; Wang Hongwei
- Cinematography: Zhang Huajie
- Edited by: Zhou Xinxia
- Music by: Xiao He
- Distributed by: FilmBlog Media
- Release date: March 21, 2007 (Hong Kong International Film Festival)
- Running time: 90 minutes
- Country: China
- Language: Mandarin

The Case is a 2007 Chinese film directed by the female first-time director, Wang Fen. It is the first film of the Yunnan New Film Project, a planned anthology of ten films directed by female Chinese directors, all taking place in the southern province of Yunnan. It was followed by The Park, also in 2007. The film was produced by Filmblog Media with the support of the Yunnan provincial government.

The Case follows an innkeeper, played by Wu Gang, who one day comes across a black suitcase floating in the river, only to discover that it contains a body, finely dismembered and frozen.

== Plot ==
He Dashang (Wu Gang) is a middle-aged childless innkeeper trapped in an unhappy marriage in a sleepy city in Yunnan, China. Sleepwalking through his days, everything changes when he spies a black suitcase floating down the river. Retrieving it, Dashang hopes to find his fortune in the mysterious case, only to discover its contents are dismembered human body parts. Thrown into panic, he attempts to hide the contents. Things become even more complicated when a young couple, the sultry Lily (Wang Sifei), and her mousy husband (Wang Hongwei) arrive at the inn.

Soon mishap follows upon mishap as He Dashang finds himself over his head.

== Cast ==
- Wu Gang as He Dashang, a middle-aged inn-keeper living in Lijiang.
- Wu Yujuan as He Dashang's wife.
- Wang Sifei as Lily, a beautiful woman who claims her car broke down and needs to use He Dashang's inn.
- Wang Hongwei as Lily's mousy husband.
- Tang Wei as Lijiang's local police chief and Wu Gang's brother-in-law.

== Production ==
The film began production on May 31, 2006 in the small city of Lijiang, in the Shuhe Old Town district. Heavy rainfall, however, threatened to delay the production until director Wang Fen made the decision to shoot some of the more dramatically intense scenes first, so as to utilize the moodier weather.

== Reception ==
Despite being actress Wang Fen's first feature film, The Case received fairly positive reviews upon its release, particularly among the Western press. Variety for example, called it an "impressive first feature," with special attention being paid to Wu Gang's "marvelous" portrayal as He Dashang, the innkeeper. Other critics, meanwhile, have noted that while the film is an "accomplished and well executed piece of cinema," the ending nevertheless can be "divisive" or at least difficult to swallow. A more technical review from FIPRESCI praised the film director's methods as "something special" in the way they reinforce "an evident theatrical treatment of the subject matter."

The Case won the 10th Shanghai International Film Festival's College Students' Favorite Asian Film.
