= Knitting (film) =

- Film poster
- Directed by: Yin Lichuan
- Written by: Yi Lichuan
- Based on: "The Story of Li Ai and Haihai" by Amei
- Produced by: Jiao Aimin; Liu Jiang; Vivian Qu
- Starring: Zhang Yi; Lu Yulai
- Cinematography: Liu Yonghong
- Edited by: Yan Tao
- Music by: Zhang Weiwei
- Distributed by: Rezo Films International
- Release date: 21 May 2008 (Cannes)
- Running time: 105 minutes
- Country: China
- Language: Mandarin

Knitting (Chinese: 牛郎织女; pinyin: Niú lán zhī nǔ) is a 2008 Chinese film directed by Yin Lichuan. Yin's second film as director, Knitting is a romantic drama. The film was adapted by Yin from the short story "The Story of Li Ai and Haihai" by author Amei.

The film premiered at the 2008 Cannes Film Festival as part of the Directors' Fortnight on 21 May 2008.

Though the film's setting is never stated, Knitting was shot in the southern Chinese city of Guangzhou.

== Cast ==
- Zhang Yi as Li Daping. A simple woman from the north, but now living in the south of China with her boyfriend Chen Jin and has recently suffered a miscarriage as the film begins.
- Yan Bingyan as Zhang Haiying. Haiying is one of Chen Jin's ex-girlfriends who suddenly moves into Daping and Chen Jin's apartment. While she bullies and taunts Daping, the two eventually come to share a bond when Chen Jin abandons a newly pregnant Daping.
- Lu Yulai as Chen Jin, Li Daping's selfish boyfriend.

== Background ==
Knitting was inspired in part on the story of the Cowheard and the Weaver Girl, the basis of the Chinese festival of Qi Xi, also called the Magpie Festival or the Chinese Valentine's Day.

Director Yin Lichuan noted in her statement of intent that Knitting was meant to explore female themes from a feminine perspective. To this end the film has two female leads, one "clumsy and simple-minded," the other "tenacious and shrewd."
