= Bing'ai =

2007 Chinese documentary film

- Directed by: Feng Yan
- Produced by: Feng Yan
- Cinematography: Feng Yan; Feng Wenze
- Edited by: Feng Yan; Mathieu Haessler
- Release date: 2007
- Running time: 114 minutes
- Country: China
- Language: Mandarin Chinese

Bing'ai (Chinese: 秉爱, also romanized Bingai) is a 2007 Chinese documentary film directed and produced by Feng Yan (冯艳). It is about a peasant woman, Zhang Bing'ai, who refused to relocate during the construction of the Three Gorges Dam.

== Awards ==
Bing'ai won the Ogawa Shinsuke Prize at the 2007 Yamagata International Documentary Film Festival. It also won First Prize at the 2008 Punto de Vista International Documentary Film Festival.

== Reception ==
In Variety, Robert Kohler called it a "beautifully observed" documentary and a "worthy addition to the Mainland's astonishing onrush of nonfiction films that take measure of the human scale in Chinese life".

== See also ==
- Up the Yangtze, a 2007 documentary film about people affected by the building of the Three Gorges Dam
