= The Park (2007 film) =

- Film poster
- Traditional Chinese: 公園
- Simplified Chinese: 公园
- Hanyu Pinyin: Gōng yúan
- Directed by: Yin Lichuan
- Written by: Yin Lichuan
- Produced by: Lola Zhang
- Starring: Li Jia; Wang Deshun; Wang Xuebing; Xu Tao
- Cinematography: Lu Sheng
- Edited by: Zhou Xinxia
- Music by: Zhou Yunshan
- Distributed by: Filmblog Media
- Release date: June 21, 2007 (Shanghai)
- Running time: 96 minutes
- Country: China
- Language: Mandarin

The Park is the 2007 directorial debut of Chinese writer-director Yin Lichuan. Produced by Filmblog Media (which also handled international distribution) and Beijing Wide Angle Lens, the comedy-drama film is part of producer Lola Zhang's Yunnan New Film Project, ten proposed films by female Chinese directors. The Park is the second of the ten to be released, after Wang Fen's The Case (2007). Each of the films was required to take place in the southern province of Yunnan.

The Park tells the story of a father's reconnection with his daughter after he moves in with her in the provincial capital of Kunming. Upset over her relationship with a younger man with no job prospects, he begins to tout her name in a local park to other elderly parents looking to marry off their children.

== Cast ==
- Wang Deshun as Gao Yuanshan, a widowed man who reconnects with his adult daughter after moving into her apartment in Kunming.
- Li Jia as Xiaojun, Yuanshan's daughter, a journalist.
- Xu Tao as Doudou, Xiaojun's boyfriend, a musician.
- Wang Xuebing as Xu Chao, a potential suitor for Xiaojun after the two are set up by Yuanshan.

== Reception ==
Screening at several major film festivals, the film has received positive reviews. After its screening in Shanghai, Variety critic Derek Elley called attention to the film's strong performances, particularly the father and daughter leads, describing their chemistry as "unshowy but excellent." It did equally well at other festivals, most notably Mannheim-Heidelberg where it picked up a FIPRESCI prize. FIPRESCI critic Ayman Youssef's praise is more technical in nature, citing the use of visual framing and the use of long and medium-shots, though he also lauds the performances as "fine and exact acting."

Additionally, the film was screened at the 29th Moscow International Film Festival and at the Bangkok International Film Festival.

=== Awards and nominations ===
- FIPRESCI Prize at the 2007 Mannheim-Heidelberg International Film Festival
