= Emily Tang =

Chinese director, writer and actress (born 1970)

- Born: 1970 (age 55–56); Sichuan Province, China
- Occupations: Director, writer, actor

Emily Tang (Chinese: 唐晓白; pinyin: Táng Xiǎobái) is a Chinese director, writer and actress whose films have won awards at various international film festivals. Her work include Conjugation (2001), Perfect Life 2008 and All Apologies (2012).

== Biography ==
Tang was born in 1970 in Sichuan Province and grew up in Beijing. She studied French literature at Peking University and later earned a master's degree in Drama from the China Academy of Art. After attending the Central Academy of Drama to study directing, she worked at Chinese Central Television producing documentaries.

In 2001 she made her directorial debut with the film Conjugation (动词变位) for which she received special mention at the Locarno Film Festival. A few years later her second film Perfect Life (完美生活) was screened in Venice and won the Dragons & Tigers award Vancouver International Film Festival. In 2012 she released her third film entitled All Apologies, which focused on the consequences of China's One Child policy. The film went on to win the HKIFF's Young Cinema Competition.
