= Love in the City (2007 film) =

2007 Hong Kong film by Jingle Ma

- Film poster
- Directed by: Jingle Ma
- Written by: Yang Qianling
- Produced by: Stanley Tong; Barbie Tung
- Starring: Gao Yuanyuan; Shawn Yue; Naoko Miyake; Takuya Suzuki
- Cinematography: Jingle Ma
- Production company: PKU Starlight Group
- Release date: 9 January 2007
- Country: Hong Kong
- Languages: Cantonese; Mandorin

Love in the City (Nan cai nu mao) is a 2007 Hong Kong film directed by Jingle Ma.

== Plot ==
Young traffic cop Yang Le (Shawn Yue) sees kindergarten teacher Xiao You (Gao Yuanyuan) leading her kids to cross the road every day. While he starts to have special feelings for her, he suddenly learns from a friend that she is a deaf-mute. Meanwhile, Yang's half-brother has a crush on a super star (Naoko Miyake) while working as her Chinese interpreter. But she will leave China when shooting is over. Can the four find true love in the end?

== Cast ==
- Gao Yuanyuan as Xiao You
- Shawn Yue as Yang Le
- Naoko Miyake as Yuko Mizuno
- Takuya Suzuki as Makoto Fukuda
