= Spring Subway =

- Promotional poster for Spring Subway
- Traditional Chinese: 開往春天的地鐵
- Simplified Chinese: 开往春天的地铁
- Hanyu Pinyin: Kāi wǎng chūntiān de dìtiě
- Directed by: Zhang Yibai
- Written by: Liu Fendou
- Produced by: Liu Fendou; Hou Keming
- Starring: Xu Jinglei; Geng Le; Wang Ning; Zhang Yang
- Cinematography: Gao Fei; Zhao Xiaoding
- Edited by: Liu Miaomiao
- Music by: Zhang Yadong
- Distributed by: Media Asia Entertainment Group, Ltd.
- Release date: May 22, 2002 (China)
- Running time: 93 minutes
- Country: China
- Language: Mandarin

Spring Subway (Chinese: 開往春天的地鐵; pinyin: Kāi wǎng chūntiān de dìtiě) is a 2002 Chinese romance film directed by Zhang Yibai, starring Xu Jinglei and Geng Le. Sixth Generation director Zhang Yang also plays a role in it. The film represents a relatively new genre in China, the artistic "commercial film" with its international urban sensibilities designed to appeal to young middle-class Chinese. Spring Subway is a stylistic film that plays with chronological conventions and flashbacks, and with characters that often break the fourth wall to directly address the audience.

The film was produced by China Youth Film Studio and the independent Electric Orange Entertainment (run by screenwriter, Liu Fendou). Distribution was handled by Media Asia Entertainment Group.

== Plot ==
Jianbin (Geng Le) and Xiaohui (Xu Jinglei) are a young couple living in Beijing who have been married for seven years. As the film starts, the couple has begun to grow bored with their existence bringing their relationship to an impasse. Xiaohui, who works at a designing firm, tentatively begins a flirtatious relationship with one of her customers, Lao Hu, a coffee-shop owner (played by director Zhang Yang). Jianbin, meanwhile, has recently been laid off, though he keeps it a secret from his wife by dressing for work every morning, hiding his briefcase in a public bathroom and riding the Beijing metro for most of the day.

While riding the subway every day, Jianbin (and the audience) becomes aware of various romances and relationships blossoming around him. Wang Yao (Fan Wei), a thirty-four-year-old cook is despondent when his blind date, Li Chuan (Wang Ning), is seriously injured in a natural gas explosion. Meanwhile, a fellow subway passenger, a health food saleswoman (Ke Lan) who hawks her goods every day on the same subway car, discovers her boyfriend has been cheating on her and has decided to leave her. The unlikely pair of the cook and the saleswoman eventually find love and become engaged to be married. Another relationship also begins in the subway between Da Ming (Tu Qiang), a young man, and a photo-development salesgirl, Tian Ai (Gao Yuanyuan). The man, painfully shy, takes pictures of himself with a note asking to meet the girl, but he flees at the last moment. When Tian Ai finally finds and confronts him, he is too ashamed to speak but manages to communicate to her his cell phone number as the train pulls away.

As for Jianbin, his life seems to spiral more out of control. Unable to pay the rent, and quickly running out of money, he also becomes aware that his wife may be having an affair, though Xiaohui keeps her relationship with Lao Hu strictly platonic. Jianbin, however, tells his wife that his "work" has decided to send him to France for training, and he begins to contemplate leaving Xiaohui while he visits the blinded schoolteacher after learning about her from Wang Yao. Pretending to be the cook, the two begin a close friendship. After Jianbin decides to confront Lao Hu in a scene where he lights the latter man's newspaper on fire, Jianbin and Xiaohui's relationship seems to be on the brink of self-destruction, as neither is willing to reveal the truth about themselves. Xiaohui, however, finally learns that Jianbin has lost his job and has been riding the subway for the past six months from Wang Yao, just as Jianbin leaves for his "trip." Instead of heading to the airport, Jianbin heads to the hospital to see Li Chuan's bandages to come off. But he leaves before she can see him, as Jianbin realizes that he still loves his wife. Xiaohui and Jianbin then meet in the same subway station where they first arrived in Beijing seven years ago as the film ends.

== Cast ==
- Geng Le as Liu Jianbin, a 28-year-old in Beijing, Liu has recently lost his job, though he still pretends to go to work everyday, spending much of his time riding Beijing's subway;
- Xu Jinglei as Chen Xiaohui, Liu's wife of seven years;
- Zhang Yang as Lao Hu, a customer at Xiaohui's design company;
- Wang Ning as Li Chuan, an injured schoolteacher;
- Fan Wei as Wang Yao, a cook;
- Ke Lan as a saleswoman, the film never names her, and she is credited only as Public Relations;
- Gao Yuanyuan as Tian Ai, a shopgirl and the object of Da Ming's affection;
- Tu Qiang as Da Ming, a young man who Jianbin meets on the train.

== Production history ==
The film is Zhang Yibai's first feature film directorial effort. Until Spring Subway, Zhang had worked primarily in the music video genre and in television. Spring Subway is also the first film to come out Liu Fendou's independent Beijing-based Electric Orange Entertainment. The film is also Liu's first attempt at both producing and screenwriting. Unlike many independent films in China, however, Spring Subway was made with official approval from the State Administration of Radio, Film, and Television.

The film's tagline in Chinese translates as: "After 7 years, is there still love?"

=== Music ===
The film's music was scored by Zhang Yadong and features vocals by the pop rock band Yu Quan.

== Reception ==
Spring Subway is significant in that it represents a new style of Chinese film. Unlike the more controversial works of Sixth Generation directors Jia Zhangke or Wang Xiaoshuai, whose films often are banned by state authorities, Zhang Yibai's Spring Subway enjoyed state approval. As a result, it is, as one critic suggests, an example of the "ambitious independent Chinese film" that avoids major state-owned studios but nevertheless retains a significant amount of both international and domestic popularity. In particular, Zhang's film reflects a new optimism that is a break from typical Chinese international fare, while others have commented that the film is indeed more "international" in its sensibilities. One critic at the Hawaii International Film Festival praised the film's universal appeal in that the film's story could have "take[n] place in any city, and surely anyone who has loved has experienced at least part of what these characters come to know."

Spring Subway has found some success on the film festival circuit, including Udine, Cannes, Seattle and others. It was also released domestically in China in May 2002.
