= The Red Awn =

- Film poster
- Traditional Chinese: 紅色康拜因
- Simplified Chinese: 红色康拜因
- Hanyu Pinyin: Hóngsè kāngbàiyīn
- Directed by: Cai Shangjun
- Written by: Cai Shangjun; Gu Xiaobai; Feng Rui
- Produced by: Li Xudong
- Starring: Yao Anlian; Lu Yulai; Huang Lu; Shi Junhui; Wang Hong
- Cinematography: Li Chengyu; Chen Hao
- Edited by: Zhou Ying
- Music by: Huang Zhenyu; Dong Wei
- Distributed by: Xiudong Hao Ye/Wan Ji
- Release date: October 6, 2007 (Pusan)
- Running time: 105 minutes
- Country: China
- Language: Mandarin

The Red Awn (simplified Chinese: 红色康拜因; traditional Chinese: 紅色康拜因; pinyin: Hóngsè kāngbàiyīn; lit. 'The Red Combine') is a 2007 Chinese film directed Cai Shangjun. It premiered at the 2007 Pusan International Film Festival where it won the FIPRESCI Prize. The film tells the story of a father and son in China's interior Gansu province. It won the Golden Alexander, the top award at the International Thessaloniki Film Festival.

== Cast ==
- Yao Anlian as Song, a man who returns to his hometown after five years only to discover that his family has declared him dead.
- Lu Yulai as Yongtao, Song's 17-year-old son.
- Shi Junhui as Yongshan, Song's friend and the owner of the titular (in the original Chinese) red combine harvester.
- Huang Lu

== Reception ==
The Red Awn found success on the international film festival circuit early on. Besides winning the FIPRESCI Prize at Pusan, The Red Awn was an official selection of the 2007 International Thessaloniki Film Festival where it premiered on November 24, 2007. It went on to win the Golden Alexander, the festival's top prize along with a €37,000 monetary award.

On November 11, 2008, the film won the Jury Grand Prize in the 2008 Asia Pacific Screen Awards.

=== Awards and nominations ===
- 2007 International Thessaloniki Film Festival
  - Golden Alexander
- 2007 Pusan International Film Festival
  - FIPRESCI Prize
- 2008 Asia Pacific Screen Awards
  - Jury Grand Prize (shared with The Prisoner)
