= Yin Lichuan =

Chinese writer, poet and filmmaker (born 1973)

Yin Lichuan (simplified Chinese: 尹丽川; traditional Chinese: 尹麗川) (born 1973) is a Chinese writer, poet and filmmaker. A graduate of Peking University and ESEC (école supérieure d'études cinématographiques in Paris), Yin made her name writing novels and poetry, including A Little More Comfort and Fucker. She is known as a member of the "Lower Body Poets." Her book of selected poems Karma in bilingual edition (Tolsun Books, 2020) is translated by writer-poet Fiona Sze-Lorrain.

Recently, Yin has expanded into film. Her debut, The Park (2007), was produced as part of the Yunnan New Film Project. Her sophomore effort, Knitting, was released in 2008.

== Filmography ==
Year	English Title	Chinese Title	Notes
2006	The Park	公园	FIPRESCI Prize at the 2007 Mannheim-Heidelberg International Film Festival
2008	Knitting	牛郎织女	
