= Derek Elley =

American film critic

Derek Elley (born c. 1955) is an American film and music critic and author, best known as the resident film critic for Variety until his departure in March 2010. With over 1200 reviews to his credit as of December 2014 on Rotten Tomatoes, he specialises in reviewing Asian films and joined Film Business Asia as chief critic upon its inception after leaving Variety in 2010. He currently hosts a film review website Sino-Cinema.

== Biography ==
Elley was a music critic in the 1970s and 1980s, and authored the annual International Music Guides. In 1986 he published Dimitri Tiomkin: The Man and His Music in conjunction with the National Film Theatre. In 1977 he published World Filmography with Peter Cowie, and began authoring the annual Movie Guides for Variety from the 1990s. He co-founded the Udine Far East Film Festival and was its artistic director for the first three editions, starting in 1999. In 2013, Routledge published his The Epic Film: Myth and History, a detailed insight into the making and history of epic films. In it, he refers to Ben Hur (1959) as the "zenith of the Hollywood cycle". With his expertise in Asian cinema, Elley has been outspoken on several topics, and has been critical of misogyny in Tsai Ming-liang's films. Since 2015, he is publishing his new texts as well as re-publishing the old ones on his personal website, Sino-Cinema, amassing a total of 1050 reviews of Chinese-language films as of April 11, 2020.
