= Zhang Yang (director) =

Chinese film director, screenwriter and actor

- Born: 1967 (age 58–59)
- Occupations: Film director, screenwriter, actor
- Awards: Golden Alexander; 1999 Shower; Silver Seashell for Best Director; 1999 Shower; 2005 Sunflower; FIPRESCI Prize; 1999 Shower (Toronto); 2001 Quitting (Stockholm)Golden Rooster Awards – Best First Film; 1998 Spicy Love Soup

Chinese name
- Traditional Chinese: 張揚
- Simplified Chinese: 张扬
Transcriptions
Standard Mandarin
- Hanyu Pinyin: Zhāng Yáng

Zhang Yang
- Traditional Chinese: 張揚
- Simplified Chinese: 张扬
Transcriptions
Standard Mandarin
- Hanyu Pinyin: Zhāng Yáng
- Wade–Giles: Chang Yang
Yue: Cantonese
- Yale Romanization: Jang1 Yang2
- Jyutping: Zoeng^{1} joeng^{4}

Zhang Yang (simplified Chinese: 张扬; traditional Chinese: 張揚; pinyin: Zhāng Yáng; born 1967) is a Chinese film director, screenwriter, and occasional actor. He is the son of film director Zhang Huaxun.

== Early life ==
Zhang grew up in Beijing and studied until 1988 at Sun Yat-sen University in Guangdong, from which he graduated with a degree in Chinese literature. He then went to the Central Academy of Drama, graduating in 1992.

== Career ==
Zhang Yang uses a realistic style and achieved great recognition for his 1999 independent production Xizao (洗澡; English translation: Shower), which was successful at Chinese box offices and international film festivals. This was followed in 2001 by Zuotian ("Quitting" in its American release). The actors in this unusual story about a real actor, Jia Hongsheng, and his struggle with drug addiction are Jia himself, Jia's parents, fellow inmates in a mental institution, the director, Zhang, and others playing themselves. The relationship between parents and their grown children is as central to this film as it was in Shower.

== Filmography ==
=== As director ===
Year	English Title	Chinese Title	Pinyin	Notes
1997	Spicy Love Soup	爱情麻辣烫	Àiqíng málàtàng	Elected for competition at the 1998 Tokyo International Film Festival. First independent Chinese film to achieve domestic box office success.
1999	Shower	洗澡	Xǐzǎo	
2001	Quitting	昨天	Zuótiān	
2005	Sunflower	向日葵	Xiàngrìkuí	
2007	Getting Home	落叶归根	Luòyèguīgēn	
2010	Driverless	无人驾驶	Wúrén jiàshǐ	
2012	Old Man's Wish	老人愿	Lǎorén yuàn	
2012	Full Circle	飞越老人院	Fēiyuè lǎorényuàn	
2015	Paths of the Soul			Selection of 2015 Toronto International Film Festival.
2016	Soul on a String	《皮绳上的魂》		

=== As actor ===
Year	English Title	Chinese Title	Pinyin	Role
2002	Spring Subway	开往春天的地铁;	Kāi wǎng chūntiān de dìtiě	Lao Hu
