= Zhang Yibai =

Chinese film director

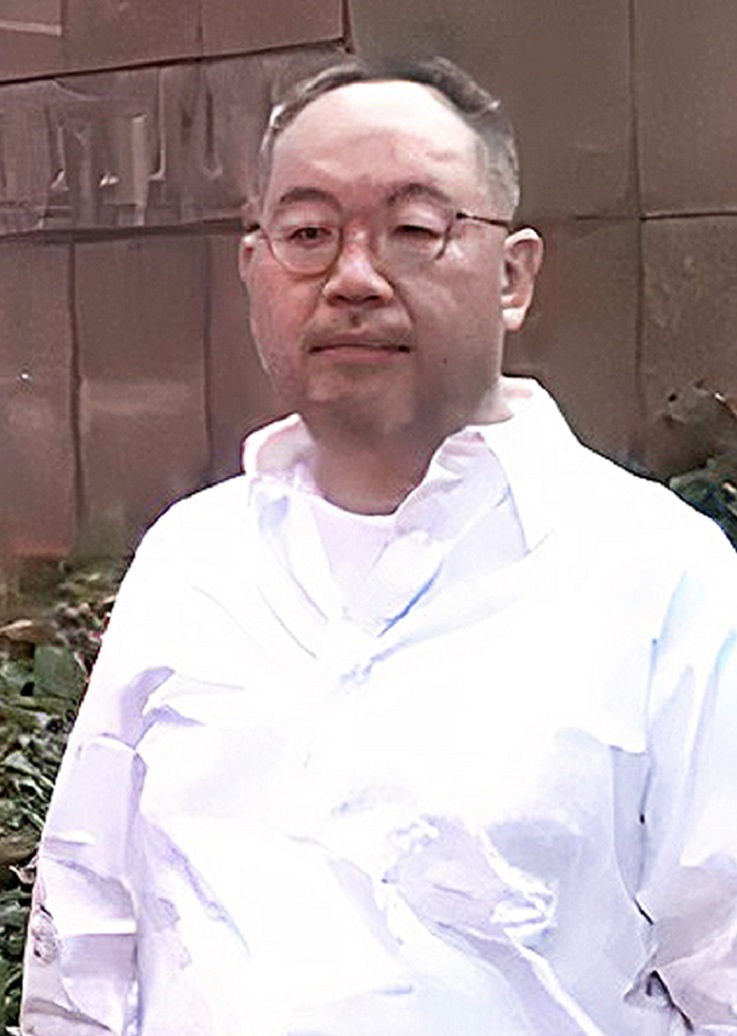
- Zhang attended the premiere of the film My People, My Country in 2019.
- Born: Zhang Xiaoling; April 14, 1963 (age 63); Chongqing, People's Republic of China
- Occupations: Film director screenwriter producer

Chinese name
- Traditional Chinese: 張一白
- Simplified Chinese: 张一白
Transcriptions
Standard Mandarin
- Hanyu Pinyin: Zhāng Yībái

Zhang Xiaoling, known professionally as Zhang Yibai (simplified Chinese: 张一白; traditional Chinese: 張一白; born 14 April 1963), is a Chinese filmmaker.

== Directorial career ==
Zhang began his career in television and music videos before directing his debut, Spring Subway in 2002.

Zhang, like many other modern Chinese directors, has focused primarily on life in modern Chinese cities. Spring Subway, for example, follows its protagonist as he wanders through Beijing's subway system, while the mystery-thriller Curiosity Killed the Cat follows its characters through the central China boomtown of Chongqing (also Zhang's hometown).

His next two films, 2007's The Longest Night in Shanghai and 2008's Lost, Indulgence have seen the director's exposure and successes extending increasingly overseas. Longest Night, starring Zhao Wei, constitutes one of the first China-Japan coproductions, while Lost was selected to premiere at New York City's Tribeca Film Festival in 2008.

== Filmography ==
Year	English Title	Chinese Title	Notes/Ref.
2002	Spring Subway	开往春天的地铁	
2005	About Love	关于爱	Directed segment "Shanghai"
2006	Curiosity Killed the Cat	好奇害死猫	
2007	The Longest Night in Shanghai	夜上海	Chinese-Japanese coproduction
2008	Lost Indulgence	秘岸	
2011	Eternal Moment	将爱	
2013	Forgetting to Know You	忘了去懂你	as actor
2014	Five Minutes to Tomorrow	深夜前的五分钟	as actor
2014	Fleet of Time	匆匆那年	
2016	Mr. Nian	年兽大作战	as actor
2016	Run for Love	奔爱	
2016	I Belonged to You	从你的全世界路过	
2019	My People, My Country	我和我的祖国	
2020	Leap	夺冠	as producer
2020	Run for Young	风犬少年的天空	
TBA	Descendants of the Sun		
