= Waiting for the Barbarians (disambiguation) =

Waiting for the Barbarians is a 1980 novel by South African author J. M. Coetzee.

Waiting for the Barbarians may also refer to:

- "Waiting for the Barbarians" (poem), a 1904 poem by Constantine P. Cavafy
- Waiting for the Barbarians (opera), a 2005 opera by Philip Glass based on the Coetzee novel
- Waiting for the Barbarians (Rauch), a 2007 painting by Neo Rauch
- Waiting for the Barbarians (film), a 2019 film, based on the Coetzee novel
- Waiting for the Barbarians, a 1997 book by Lewis H. Lapham
- "Waiting for the Barbarians", a 2006 song by Anaal Nathrakh from Eschaton
- Waiting for the Barbarians: A Tribute to Edward W. Said, a 2008 collection of writings after the death of Edward Said
- Waiting for the Barbarians, a 2011 choral work by Andrew Ford based on the Cavafy poem
