= Marc-Henri Wajnberg =

Belgian film director

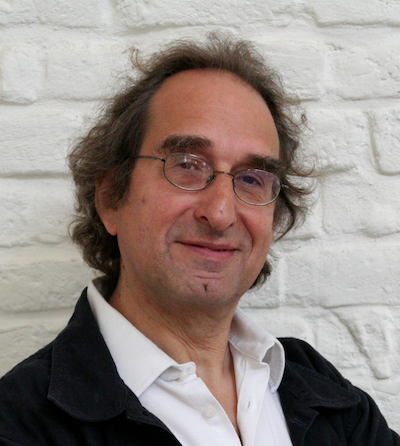
- Born: 1953 (age 72–73); Brussels, Belgium
- Occupations: film director; screenwriter; film producer
- Website: https://en.wajnbrosse.com

Marc-Henri Wajnberg is a Belgian director and producer. He studied cinema at INSAS, in Brussels. He is also a screenwriter, actor and head of the production company Wajnbrosse Productions.

He has directed more than 2,700 short and very short films, documentaries, feature films, an interactive virtual reality film, 2D animations and in stop motion. He launched the trend of short films worldwide in the early 1980s with his collection of 1,200 8-second films CLAPMAN (CLAP), broadcast daily in about fifty countries and of which he is the author, performer, director and producer. His first feature film, Just Friends, in 1993, was the film representing Belgium for the Academy Awards. His work has been awarded more than 107 international prizes, including the Rail d’Or at Cannes for the short film The Alarm Clock (Le Réveil) in 1996.

== Biography ==
Originally from Brussels, Marc-Henri Wajnberg pursued cinema studies at the National Higher Institute of Performing Arts and Broadcasting Techniques (INSAS), where his graduation project was selected for the international meetings (Cilect).

His career took off in 1982 with CLAPMAN (CLAP), a project he signed as author, actor, director and producer. This collection of 1,200 8-second shorts broadcast daily achieved international success in more than 50 countries and won 5 international awards, notably the Gold Award at the New York International Film and TV Festival in 1984.

In 1993 he directed his first feature film, Just Friends, which immerses us in the jazz music scene in Antwerp in 1959, through a talented saxophonist dreaming of making a career in New York. Starring Josse de Pauw, Sylvie Milhaud, Ann Gisel Glass and Charles Berling, it won 14 awards.

He then directed the short film The Alarm Clock (Le Réveil) in 1996, which was awarded the Rail d’Or at Cannes, in which he stages Jean-Claude Dreyfus waking up each morning using a thousand ingenious mechanisms (22 awards)..

Passionate about art and history, Wajnberg turned to creative documentary. He notably signed Yevgeny Khaldei, Photographer Under Stalin (Evgueni Khaldei, photographe sous Staline) in 1997 then Oscar Niemeyer, an Architect Committed to His Century (Oscar Niemeyer, un architecte engagé dans le siècle) in 2001, portrait of the most prolific architect of the 20th century, awarded 13 times.

In the 2000s, he developed Kaleidoscope, looking at life frames (Kaléidoscope, regards sur un cadre de vie), a collection of 33 documentaries for Arte exploring singular living places across Europe and beyond, of which he personally directed four episodes.

In 2001, he wrote, directed and acted with Jean-Claude Dreyfus in Around the World in 80 Beers (Le tour du monde en 80 bières), a documentary fiction for a thematic evening for Arte.

For 6 years, he supervised a framework contract with the European Commission for educational productions, including Nanotechnology (Nanotechnologie), intended for European high school seniors.

He participated in the development and co-production of The Five Obstructions, in 2003, dogme documentary by Lars von Trier and Joergen Leth. A research film where the preconceptions and opinions of the two men will be continually questioned.

In 2020, he co-producedThe Barefoot Emperor, a comedy by Jessica Woodworth and Peter Brosens, sequel to the mockumentary King of Belgians, which tells how the last King of the Belgians became the first Emperor of the Europeans. The film was nominated for the 11th Magritte Awards in the category Best Flemish Film.

Focus on Kinshasa

In 2009, he produced The Earth, the Men (La Terre, des Hommes), collection of 5 documentaries filmed in Democratic Republic of the Congo. As part of the 50 years of African independence, he directed for Arte a web documentary Portraits of Kinshasa, episode of the award-winning collection AFRICA: 50 years of independence.

This Kinshasa immersion gave birth to Kinshasa Kids, his second feature film in 2012. This hybrid fiction-documentary work follows 8 street children in their quest for a better future. The film toured 60 festivals and received 8 awards, including the Odyssey Prize for Human Rights in Strasbourg given by 8 ambassadors.

Deeply committed, he helps the children in his films get off the streets, collaborating with local associations, notably the REEJER (Network of Educators of Street Children and Youth). He then innovated with Kinshasa Now with an interactive virtual reality film - technical world first - selected at Venice and in 44 countries (18 major awards).

I am Chance, in 2022, highlights street girls through the journey of Chancelvie and her friends, facing trials with smiles and resilience. Selected in 41 festivals, I am Chance won 14 major awards, including the Amade Prize from the Princess Grace Foundation of Monaco for helping children in difficulty and the ECFA (European Children's Film Association) prize for best European documentary.

After filming, the girls in the film refused to join rehabilitation centers. Following this, Marc-Henri Wajnberg imagined the ”MAISON HORIZON” pilot project, a reception center for these girls who are so socialized on the streets that they refuse to go to centers that do not correspond to their desires and needs, which he will present to the Human Rights Academy of the United Nations in Geneva.

Teaching

Marc-Henri Wajnberg taught at the École de Recherche Graphique in Brussels (1987), at the International Film School of San Antonio de Los Banos in Cuba (EICTV) (from 1994 to 2012), at the French cultural center in Kinshasa (2014), and gave lectures at Peking University.

He has been a member of several film festival juries: the Geneva Film Festival ”Star of Tomorrow” in Switzerland in 1998, the International Festival of Films on Art in Montreal, Canada (Jury President) in 2002, the Brussels International Fantastic Film Festival in Belgium in 2011, the Brussels 48 Hours Film Project in Belgium in 2015 (Jury President), the VR SMART Jury at FIPADOC in Biarritz, France in 2024 and the Badalona Festival in Spain in 2024

He chaired the Film on Art Center from 2003 to 2006 and sits on the Cinema Commission of the Wallonia-Brussels Federation.

== Filmography ==
=== Director ===
==== Fiction Feature Films ====
- 1994 : Just Friends
- 2012 : Kinshasa Kids

==== Documentary Feature Films ====
- 1978 : Happy as a Baby Under Water (Heureux comme un bébé dans l’eau) (documentary on birth without violence, 50 min)
- 1997 : Yevgeny Khaldei, Photographer Under Stalin (Evgueni Khaldei, photographe sous Staline) (64 min)
- 1999 : Around the World in 80 Beers (Le tour du monde en 80 bières) (60 min), with Jean-Claude Dreyfus
- 2001 : Oscar Niemeyer, an Architect Committed to His Century (Oscar Niemeyer, un architecte engagé dans le siècle) (60 min)
- 2014 : Sorcerer Children, Kinshasa (Enfants sorciers, Kinshasa) (52 min)
- 2022 : I Am Chance (85 min)

==== Television ====
- 1981 : Professor Adélard (Le Professeur Adélard) (children's series on fun physics, 12 episodes of 3 min 30)
- 1983 : CLAPMAN (CLAP) (series of 1,200 episodes of 8 s)
- 1987 : The Three-Cushion Billiards Table (Le billard à trois bandes) (documentary for Canal + with Josse de Pauw, Ludo Diellis, Richard Bitalis, 26 min)
- 1988 : Smoke, It's Belgian (Fume, c’est du Belge) (The Series) (Satirical micro-interview, 4 episodes of 5 min)
- 1989 : Wolinski (animated series of 40 episodes of 20 s)
- 1989 : The Last Philosophers (Les Derniers Philosophes) (series of 50 episodes of 2 min)
- 1989 : The First Three Minutes (Les trois premières minutes) (launch of Canal + Belgium)
- 1989 : The Decoder: Instructions for Use (Le décodeur : mode d’emploi) (launch of Canal + Belgium)
- 1989 : The Americans (Les ricains) (launch of Canal + Belgium)
- 1989 : Directors (Les directeurs) (launch of Canal + Belgium)
- 1989 : Good Odds (Les bonnes chances) (launch of Canal + Belgium)
- 1989 : Sports Trailer (Bande annonce sport) (launch of Canal + Belgium)
- 1989 : Cinema Credits Trailer (Bande annonce générique cinéma) (launch of Canal + Belgium)
- 1989 : Topor…Un comble ! (report on the artist for Cargo de nuit of 11 min)
- 1991 : Mr Almaniak (series mixing animation and live-action, 365 episodes of 50 s)
- 2002 : The Royal Galleries of Saint-Hubert in Brussels (Les Galeries Royales Saint-Hubert à Bruxelles) (series Kaleidoscope, Views of a Living Environment (Kaléidoscope, regards sur un cadre de vie), 26 min)
- 2002 : The Liner ”SS Norway”, Caribbean (Le Paquebot ”SS Norway”, Caraïbes) (series Kaleidoscope, Views of a Living Environment (Kaléidoscope, regards sur un cadre de vie), 26 min)
- 2004 : Denpasar Market, Bali, Indonesia (Le marché de Denpasar, Bali, Indonésie) (series Kaleidoscope, Views of a Living Environment (Kaléidoscope, regards sur un cadre de vie), 26 min)
- 2005 : Bollywood, Mumbai, India (Bollywood, Mumbaï, Inde) (series Kaleidoscope, Views of a Living Environment (Kaléidoscope, regards sur un cadre de vie), 26 min)
- 2006 : Nanotechnology, the Film (Nanotechnologie, le film) (docu/fiction on the nanoscience revolution, 26 min)
- 2007 : Hello (animated series of 900 episodes of 11 s)
- 2012 : Portraits of Kinshasa (for the ARTE collection AFRICA: 50 years of independence)

==== Short Films ====
- 1974 : Smoke, It's Belgian (Fume, c’est du belge) (Satirical micro-interview, 14 min)
- 1977 : In Trouble…Culas (Dans de beaux draps…Culas) (graduation film, 30 min)
- 1984 : Smoke, It's Belgian (Fume, c’est du belge) (The Return) (Satirical micro-interview, 10 min)
- 1985 : FLASH BACK (8 min)
- 1988 : The Picnic Family (La famille Pic-nic) (7 min)
- 1996 : The Alarm Clock (Le Réveil), with Jean-Claude Dreyfus
- 2011 : SLAP! (BAF !) (6 min)
- 2020 : Kinshasa Now (360° virtual reality short film)
- 2025 : Prout (Humorous children's short film in stop-motion plasticine and live-action, 7 min)

==== Advertising ====
- 1998 : Select (4 advertising films for the cigarette brand SELECT)
- 1998 : Tango (2 advertising films as part of the campaign Parisienne People by Famous Directors)
- 2001 : Quickly Read, Well Read (Vite lu, bien lu) (3 advertising films for the Swiss newspaper ”Le Matin”, 15 s)
- 2000 : The Euro (L’Euro) (drawings by Royer) (advertising film for the European Commission)
- 2003 : Nanotechnology (La nanotechnologie) (advertising film for the European Commission)

=== Producer ===
==== Fiction Feature Films ====
- 1991 : Money (La thune)
- 1994: Just Friends
- 2003 : The Five Obstructions
- 2012 : Kinshasa Kids
- 2019 : The Barefoot Emperor

==== Documentary Feature Films ====
- 1978 : Happy as a Baby Under Water (Heureux comme un bébé dans l’eau) (documentary on birth without violence, 50 min)
- 1997 : Yevgeny Khaldei, Photographer Under Stalin (Evgueni Khaldei, photographe sous Staline) (64 min)
- 1999 : The Lost Mummy (La Momie Perdue) (52 min)
- 1999 : Around the World in 80 Beers (Le tour du monde en 80 bières) (60 min), with Jean-Claude Dreyfus
- 2001 : Oscar Niemeyer, an Architect Committed to His Century (Oscar Niemeyer, un architecte engagé dans le siècle) (60 min)
- 2014 : Sorcerer Children, Kinshasa (Enfants sorciers, Kinshasa) (52 min)
- 2022 : I Am Chance (85 min)

==== Television ====
- 1981 : Professor Adélard (Le Professeur Adélard) (children's series on fun physics, 12 episodes of 3 min 30)
- 1983 : CLAPMAN (CLAP) (series of 1,200 episodes of 8 s)
- 1987 : The Three-Cushion Billiards Table (Le billard à trois bandes) (documentary for Canal + with Josse de Pauw, Ludo Diellis, Richard Bitalis, 26 min)
- 1988 : Smoke, It's Belgian (Fume, c’est du Belge) (The Series) (Satirical micro-interview, 4 episodes of 5 min)
- 1989 : Wolinski (animated series of 40 episodes of 20 s)
- 1989 : The Last Philosophers (Les Derniers Philosophes) (series of 50 episodes of 2 min)
- 1991 : Mr Almaniak (series mixing animation and live-action, 365 episodes of 50 s)
- 2002 - 2006 : Kaleidoscope, Views of a Living Environment (Kaléidoscope, regards sur un cadre de vie) (documentary series of 33 episodes on different lifestyles around the world, 26 min)
- 2006 : Nanotechnology, the Film (Nanotechnologie, le film) (docu/fiction on the nanoscience revolution, 26 min)
- 2007 : Hello (animated series of 900 episodes of 11 s)
- 2010 : The Earth, the Men (La Terre, des Hommes) (documentary series on agriculture in Congo and Belgium, 5 episodes of 26 min)
- 2012 : Portraits of Kinshasa (for the ARTE collection AFRICA: 50 years of independence)

==== Short Films ====
- 1974 : Smoke, It's Belgian (Fume, c’est du belge) (Satirical micro-interview, 14 min)
- 1984 : Smoke, It's Belgian (Fume, c’est du belge) (The Return) (Satirical micro-interview, 10 min)
- 1985 : FLASH BACK (8 min)
- 1988 : The Picnic Family (La famille Pic-nic) (7 min)
- 1996 : The Alarm Clock (Le Réveil)
- 2011 : SLAP! (BAF !) (6 min)
- 2020 : Kinshasa Now (360° virtual reality short film)
- 2025 : Prout (Humorous children's short film in stop-motion plasticine and live-action, 7 min)
- Advertising
- 1998 : Select (4 advertising films for the cigarette brand SELECT)
- 1998 - 2003 : 17 advertising films for the European Commission

=== Screenwriter ===
==== Fiction Feature Films ====
- 1980 : Mama Dracula
- 1994 : Just Friends
- 2012 : Kinshasa Kids
- 2008 : San Mao

==== Documentary Feature Films ====
- 1978 : Happy as a Baby Under Water (Heureux comme un bébé dans l’eau) (documentary on birth without violence, 50 min)
- 1997 : Yevgeny Khaldei, Photographer Under Stalin (Evgueni Khaldei, photographe sous Staline) (64 min)
- 1999 : Around the World in 80 Beers (Le tour du monde en 80 bières) (60 min), with Jean-Claude Dreyfus
- 2001 : Oscar Niemeyer, an Architect Committed to His Century (Oscar Niemeyer, un architecte engagé dans le siècle) (60 min)
- 2014 : Sorcerer Children, Kinshasa (Enfants sorciers, Kinshasa) (52 min)
- 2022 : I Am Chance (85 min)

==== Television ====
- 1981 : Professor Adélard (Le Professeur Adélard) (children's series on fun physics, 12 episodes of 3 min 30)
- 1983 : CLAPMAN (CLAP) (series of 1,200 episodes of 8 s)
- 1987 : The Three-Cushion Billiards Table (Le billard à trois bandes) (documentary for Canal + with Josse de Pauw, Ludo Diellis, Richard Bitalis, 26 min)
- 1988 : Smoke, It's Belgian (Fume, c’est du Belge) (The Series) (Satirical micro-interview, 4 episodes of 5 min)
- 1989 : Wolinski (animated series of 40 episodes of 20 s)
- 1989 : The Last Philosophers (Les Derniers Philosophes) (series of 50 episodes of 2 min)
- 1989 : The First Three Minutes (Les trois premières minutes) (launch of Canal + Belgium)
- 1989 : The Decoder: Instructions for Use (Le décodeur : mode d’emploi) (launch of Canal + Belgium)
- 1989 : The Americans (Les ricains) (launch of Canal + Belgium)
- 1989 : Directors (Les directeurs) (launch of Canal + Belgium)
- 1989 : Good Odds (Les bonnes chances) (launch of Canal + Belgium)
- 1989 : Sports Trailer (Bande annonce sport) (launch of Canal + Belgium)
- 1989 : Cinema Credits Trailer (Bande annonce générique cinéma) (launch of Canal + Belgium)
- 1991 : Mr Almaniak (series mixing animation and live-action, 365 episodes of 50 s)
- 2002 : The Royal Galleries of Saint-Hubert in Brussels (Les Galeries Royales Saint-Hubert à Bruxelles) (series Kaleidoscope, Views of a Living Environment (Kaléidoscope, regards sur un cadre de vie), 26 min)
- 2002 : The Liner ”SS Norway”, Caribbean (Le Paquebot ”SS Norway”, Caraïbes) (series Kaleidoscope, Views of a Living Environment (Kaléidoscope, regards sur un cadre de vie), 26 min)
- 2004 : Denpasar Market, Bali, Indonesia (Le marché de Denpasar, Bali, Indonésie) (series Kaleidoscope, Views of a Living Environment (Kaléidoscope, regards sur un cadre de vie), 26 min)
- 2005 : Bollywood, Mumbai, India (Bollywood, Mumbaï, Inde) (series Kaleidoscope, Views of a Living Environment (Kaléidoscope, regards sur un cadre de vie), 26 min)
- 2006 : Nanotechnology, the Film (Nanotechnologie, le film) (docu/fiction on the nanoscience revolution, 26 min)
- 2007 : Hello (animated series of 900 episodes of 11 s)
- 2009 : The Earth, the Men (La Terre, des Hommes) (documentary series on agriculture in Congo and Belgium, 5 episodes of 26 min)
- 2012 : Portraits of Kinshasa (for the ARTE collection AFRICA: 50 years of independence)

==== Short Films ====
- 1974 : Smoke, It's Belgian (Fume, c’est du belge) (Satirical micro-interview, 14 min)
- 1977 : In Trouble…Culas (Dans de beaux draps…Culas) (graduation film, 30 min)
- 1984 : Smoke, It's Belgian (Fume, c’est du belge) (The Return) (Satirical micro-interview, 10 min)
- 1985 : FLASH BACK (8 min)
- 1996 : The Alarm Clock (Le Réveil), with Jean-Claude Dreyfus
- 2011 : SLAP! (BAF !) (6 min)
- 2020 : Kinshasa Now (360° virtual reality short film)
- 2025 : Prout (Humorous children's short film in stop-motion plasticine and live-action, 7 min)

==== Advertising ====
- 1998 : Select (4 advertising films for the cigarette brand SELECT)
- 1998 : Tango (2 advertising films as part of the campaign Parisienne People by Famous Directors)
- 2001 : Quickly Read, Well Read (Vite lu, bien lu) (3 advertising films for the Swiss newspaper ”Le Matin”, 15 s)
- 2000 : The Euro (L’Euro) (drawings by Royer) (advertising film for the European Commission)
- 2003 : Nanotechnology (La nanotechnologie) (advertising film for the European Commission)

=== Actor ===
==== Cinema ====
- 1979 : Attention to Color (Attention à la couleur) : Marc
- 1980 : Mama Dracula : Vladimir
- 1990 : Koko Flanel : Frédérique
- 2005 : Bunker Paradise : The client

==== Documentary ====
- 1999 : Around the World in 80 Beers (Le tour du monde en 80 bières) : Johnny
- 1991 : Mr Almaniak : Presenter

==== Television ====
- 1981 : Professor Adélard (Le Professeur Adélard) : The professor
- 1983 : CLAPMAN (CLAP) : Clapman

==== Short Films ====
- 1974 : Smoke, It's Belgian (Fume, c’est du belge) (Satirical micro-interview, 14 min) : Journalist
- 1984 : Smoke, It's Belgian (Fume, c’est du belge) (The Return) (Satirical micro-interview, 10 min) : Journalist
- 1985 : FLASH BACK (8 min)
- 1994 : Phew! (Ouf!)

==== Theater ====
- 1975 : Vous disiez Monsieur IngresFilmography

== Awards ==
Date	Ceremony	Award	Film Name
1974	Festival International Super 8 de Bruxelles	Prix du Montage	Smoke, It's Belgian (Fume, c'est du belge), 1974
1982	Festival International du Film scientifique de Bruxelles	Prix de Psychologie	Happy as a Baby Under Water (Heureux comme un bébé dans l'eau), 1978
1984	New York International Film and TV Festival	Gold Award	CLAPMAN (CLAP), 1983
1984	Antenne de Cristal, Bruxelles	Meilleur Programme Belge	CLAPMAN (CLAP), 1983
1985	Concours du Creative Club de Belgique	Gold Award	CLAPMAN (CLAP), 1983
1986	Festival de cinéma de Sao Paulo, Brésil	Best short	CLAPMAN (CLAP), 1983
1993	l'Union de la Critique Cinéma (UCC)	Prix André Cavens	Just Friends, 1993
1993	Festival de La Baule	Prix du Jury	Just Friends, 1993
1993	Festival de La Baule	Prix du Meilleur comédien	Just Friends, 1993
1993	Prix de la Jeunesse	Meilleur film belge	Just Friends, 1993
1993	Ville de Bruxelles	Prix Femina	Just Friends, 1993
1993	Philip Morris Movie Club	Prix du Meilleur Scénario	Just Friends, 1993
1993	Magazine Jazz in Time	Disque du mois	Just Friends, 1993
1994	Festival de Montevideo	Prix de la Première Œuvre	Just Friends, 1993
1994	Festival du Film du Val d'Aoste	Grand Prix	Just Friends, 1993
1994	Festival de Gand	Prix Joseph Plateau du Meilleur Film Belge	Just Friends, 1993
1994	Festival de Gand	Prix Joseph Plateau du Meilleur Acteur	Just Friends, 1993
1994	Festival de Gand	Prix Joseph Plateau du Meilleur Réalisateur	Just Friends, 1993
1994	Rencontres Internationales du Film de Sorrento	Grand Prix	Just Friends, 1993
1994	Nomination aux Oscars	Représentant de la Belgique	Just Friends, 1993
1996	Festival de Cannes	Rail d'Or	The Alarm Clock (Le Réveil), 1996
1996	Festival de Potsdam	Grand Prix	The Alarm Clock (Le Réveil), 1996
1996	Festival International du Film de Comédie de Vevey	Meilleur Court Métrage	The Alarm Clock (Le Réveil), 1996
1996	Festival International de Palm Springs	Meilleur Court Métrage de Comédie	The Alarm Clock (Le Réveil), 1996
1996	Festival International du Court-Métrage de Capalbio	Prix de la Mise en Scène	The Alarm Clock (Le Réveil), 1996
1996	Festival International du Court-Métrage de Capalbio	Prix du Public	The Alarm Clock (Le Réveil), 1996
1996	Festival International du Film de Namur	Prix de la Communauté française	The Alarm Clock (Le Réveil), 1996
1996	Festival International du Court Métrage de Huy	Palme d'Argent	The Alarm Clock (Le Réveil), 1996
1996	Festival International du Court Métrage de Huy	Meilleur Acteur	The Alarm Clock (Le Réveil), 1996
1996	Festival International du Court Métrage de Bucarest	Prix de la Mise en Scène	The Alarm Clock (Le Réveil), 1996
1997	Festival International du Film Action et Aventures de Valenciennes	Mention spéciale du Jury	The Alarm Clock (Le Réveil), 1996
1997	Festival du Court Métrage pour Jeune Public de Stains	Prix du Jeune Public	The Alarm Clock (Le Réveil), 1996
1997	Festival du Film Ferroviaire de St-Ouen	Prix du Court Métrage de Création	The Alarm Clock (Le Réveil), 1996
1998	Golden Gate Awards de San Francisco	Silver Spire	Yevgeny Khaldei, Photographer Under Stalin (Evgueni Khaldei, photographe sous Staline), 1997
1998	Festival International du Documentaire de Taiwan	Grand Prix	Yevgeny Khaldei, Photographer Under Stalin (Evgueni Khaldei, photographe sous Staline), 1997
1998	Festival International du Film à Beauvais	Prix du Public	The Alarm Clock (Le Réveil), 1996
1998	Festival Mediawave - Gyor	Prix de la Meilleure Fiction Absurde	The Alarm Clock (Le Réveil), 1996
1998	Festival de Wine Country	Meilleur Court Métrage International	The Alarm Clock (Le Réveil), 1996
1999	Festival International du Film pour Enfant, Tournai	Fifety d'Or	The Alarm Clock (Le Réveil), 1996
2000	Festival International du Film de Rhode Island	Premier Prix	Yevgeny Khaldei, Photographer Under Stalin (Evgueni Khaldei, photographe sous Staline), 1997
2000	Madrid	Gran Premio "DOCUMANIA"	Oscar Niemeyer, an Architect Committed to His Century (Oscar Niemeyer, un architecte engagé dans le siècle), 2001
2000	Muestra Intl De Patrimonio Arquitectonico Alcala	Gran Premio	Oscar Niemeyer, an Architect Committed to His Century (Oscar Niemeyer, un architecte engagé dans le siècle), 2001
2000	Festival du Documentaire de Création Européen à Strasbourg	Premier Prix	Oscar Niemeyer, an Architect Committed to His Century (Oscar Niemeyer, un architecte engagé dans le siècle), 2001
2000	Festival du Documentaire de Création Européen à Strasbourg	Prix du Public	Oscar Niemeyer, an Architect Committed to His Century (Oscar Niemeyer, un architecte engagé dans le siècle), 2001
2001	Ajijic Festival International du Cinéma	Los Charales Awards	Oscar Niemeyer, an Architect Committed to His Century (Oscar Niemeyer, un architecte engagé dans le siècle), 2001
2001	Sydney Changing Images International Film Festival	Meilleur Documentaire	Oscar Niemeyer, an Architect Committed to His Century (Oscar Niemeyer, un architecte engagé dans le siècle), 2001
2001	U.S. International Film and Video Festival à Elmhurst, Illinois	Silver Screen	Oscar Niemeyer, an Architect Committed to His Century (Oscar Niemeyer, un architecte engagé dans le siècle), 2001
2001	Festival International du Film sur l'Art de Montréal	Grand Prix FIFA	Oscar Niemeyer, an Architect Committed to His Century (Oscar Niemeyer, un architecte engagé dans le siècle), 2001
2001	Festival de Monte-Carlo	Médaille de Bronze	Oscar Niemeyer, an Architect Committed to His Century (Oscar Niemeyer, un architecte engagé dans le siècle), 2001
2001	Festival du court métrage de Badalona	Grand prix	The Alarm Clock (Le Réveil), 1996
2001	Festival du court métrage de Badalona	Prix du public	The Alarm Clock (Le Réveil), 1996
2001	Petits Déjeuners du Cinéma	Croissant d'Or	The Alarm Clock (Le Réveil), 1996
2002	Thunderbird International Film Festival	Meilleur direction de photo documentaire	Oscar Niemeyer, an Architect Committed to His Century (Oscar Niemeyer, un architecte engagé dans le siècle), 2001
2002	Thunderbird International Film Festival	Meilleur Documentaire Professionel	Oscar Niemeyer, an Architect Committed to His Century (Oscar Niemeyer, un architecte engagé dans le siècle), 2001
2002	Festival International de FILMETS à Badalona	Prix du Meilleur Film diffusé dans le programme Filmets de la TVB	The Alarm Clock (Le Réveil), 1996
2003	Technfilm	Price of Czech Ministry of education for Youth & Physical Training	Nanotechnology, the Film (Nanotechnologie, le film), 2006
2003	33rd Roshd International Film Festival	Silver Book	Nanotechnology, the Film (Nanotechnologie, le film), 2006
2004	Festival International du Film sur l'Architecture de Bratislava	Premier Prix	Oscar Niemeyer, an Architect Committed to His Century (Oscar Niemeyer, un architecte engagé dans le siècle), 2001
2004	Festival de Kiev	Prix du Public	Oscar Niemeyer, an Architect Committed to His Century (Oscar Niemeyer, un architecte engagé dans le siècle), 2001
2004	Durban International Film Festival	Best Documentary	The Five Obstructions, 2003
2004	Gulddok, Copenhaguen	Gold Dok of the Year	The Five Obstructions, 2003
2004	Odense International Film Festival	Grand Prix	The Five Obstructions, 2003
2004	Zagreb Motovun Film Festival	Prix du Jury FIPRESCI	The Five Obstructions, 2003
2012	Étoiles et Toiles du Cinéma Européen (Strasbourg)	Prix Odyssée-Conseil de l'Europe pour les Droits de l'Homme	Kinshasa Kids, 2012
2013	Festival du film de Bucarest	Prix du Public	Kinshasa Kids, 2012
2013	Festival de Festroia - Portugal	Mention Spéciale "L'Homme et son environnement"	Kinshasa Kids, 2012
2013	Festival Écrans Noirs de Yaoundé	Prix du meilleur film étranger	Kinshasa Kids, 2012
2013	Festival de Marrakech	Coup de Coeur	Kinshasa Kids, 2012
2014	Union de la Presse Cinématographique Belge / Belgique	Le Prix Humanum	Kinshasa Kids, 2012
2014	Magritte du Cinéma	Meilleur Montage & Nomination pour le Meilleur Film	Kinshasa Kids, 2012
2014	Festival Ciné Droit Libre - Ouagadougou Burkina Faso	Prix du Public	Sorcerer Children, Kinshasa (Enfants Sorciers, Kinshasa), 2014
2014	Festival Ciné Droit Libre - Ouagadougou Burkina Faso	Mention spéciale du Jury	Sorcerer Children, Kinshasa (Enfants Sorciers, Kinshasa), 2014
2019	Festival du Film d'Avanca	Mention spéciale	The Barefoot Emperor, 2020
2020	Satis - 360° Film Festival (Paris, France)	Grand Prix	Kinshasa Now, 2020
2020	Filmfest Gent	Joseph Plateau Honorary Award pour Geraldine Chaplin	The Barefoot Emperor, 2020
2020	Pula Film Festival	Golden Arenas pour le meilleur film	The Barefoot Emperor, 2020
2020	Pula Film Festival	Golden Arenas pour le meilleur réalisateur	The Barefoot Emperor, 2020
2020	Pula Film Festival	Golden Arenas pour le meilleur acteur	The Barefoot Emperor, 2020
2020	AFI European Union Film Showcase	Prix du public	The Barefoot Emperor, 2020
2021	Crow Wood International Film Festival (Calcutta, Inde)	Best Virtual Reality and 360°	Kinshasa Now, 2020
2021	L'âge d'or International Arthouse Film Festival (Calcutta, Inde)	Best Virtual Reality and 360°	Kinshasa Now, 2020
2021	Virgin Spring Cinefest (Calcutta, Inde)	Gold Award	Kinshasa Now, 2020
2021	The Druk International Film Festival (Paro, Bhoutan)	Best VR and 360 °	Kinshasa Now, 2020
2021	Tagore International Film Festival (Bolpur, Inde)	Grand Prix	Kinshasa Now, 2020
2021	World Film Carnival (Singapour)	Gold Award	Kinshasa Now, 2020
2021	Sun of the East Award	Best VR	Kinshasa Now, 2020
2021	Krimson Horyzon International Film Festival (Calcutta, Inde)	Best VR	Kinshasa Now, 2020
2021	Buenos Aires International Film Festival - BUEIFF (Argentine)	Best Virtual Reality	Kinshasa Now, 2020
2021	Realtime International Film Festival (Nigeria)	Honorable mention & Best 360 degrees movie	Kinshasa Now, 2020
2021	Alpinale Short Film Festival (Autriche)	Meilleur court métrage VR - Prix Spécial	Kinshasa Now, 2020
2021	Festival Villa del Ciné (Bogota, Colombie)	Meilleur court métrage VR	Kinshasa Now, 2020
2022	Festival de Télévision de Monte-Carlo	Prix Amade	I Am Chance, 2022
2022	Filem'On – Festival International de Cinéma Jeune public	ECFA Documentary Award	I Am Chance, 2022
2022	Festival Africlap	Grand Prix de la Solidarité Internationale	I Am Chance, 2022
2022	San José International Film Awards	Best Feature Documentary	I Am Chance, 2022
2023	Pampa DocFest	Best Feature Documentary	I Am Chance, 2022
2023	IBIZA CINEFEST	Prix du Public[1]	I Am Chance, 2022
2023	San Antonio Independent Film Festival	Best Documentary Feature	I Am Chance, 2022
2023	Festival International de Cinéma Vues d'Afrique	Mention spéciale	I Am Chance, 2022
2023	Festival International des Films Identitaires et Solidaires	Prix du Public	I Am Chance, 2022
2023	Magritte du Cinéma	Nomination – Meilleur Documentaire	I Am Chance, 2022
2023	ECFA Awards	Nomination for Best European Children's Film	I Am Chance, 2022
2024	International Ethnographic Film Festival OKO	Feature Film Competition Award	I Am Chance, 2022
2024	9ème Festival International Cinéma et Philosophie de Fès	Prix Averroes	I Am Chance, 2022
2025	ZIFFA - Ziguinchor International Film Festival & Animation 2025 (Ziguinchor, Sénégal)	Prix du meilleur court-métrage d'animation	Prout, 2025
2025	SJIFA - San José International Film Awards 2025 (San José, Costa Rica)	Prix du meilleur court-métrage d'animation	Prout, 2025

In total, Marc-Henri Wajnberg's films have been awarded more than 107 international prizes.

- Just Friends was awarded 13 international prizes, including the awards for best Belgian film, best actor (Josse de Pauw) and best director at the Ghent Film Festival (Joseph Plateau Award).
- The Alarm Clock (Le Réveil) won, in addition to the Rail d'Or at Cannes, 22 other international prizes.
- Yevgeny Khaldei, Photographer Under Stalin (Evgueni Khaldeï, photographe sous Staline) won 3 prizes and Oscar Niemeyer, an Architect Committed to His Century (Oscar Niemeyer, Un architecte engagé dans le siècle) was also internationally recognized with 13 prizes.
- Kinshasa Kids received the Human Rights Prize, presented in Strasbourg by 8 ambassadors. The film was selected at Venice, Toronto, Busan, New York, ... (8 prizes and more than 50 festivals).
- Kinshasa Now received 18 international awards and was selected in 44 festivals including the Venice Film Festival where it was in official competition in the 'virtual reality' section.

I Am Chance was nominated for the Magritte Awards and selected in 41 international festivals, notably at the États généraux du film documentaire. It received 14 awards.
