= Just Friends (1993 film) =

1993 Belgian film by Marc-Henri Wajnberg

- Theatrical release poster
- Directed by: Marc-Henri Wajnberg
- Written by: Pierre Sterckx; Alexandre Wajnberg
- Produced by: Marc-Henri Wajnberg
- Starring: Josse De Pauw; Ann-Gisel Glass; Charles Berling; Sylvie Milhaud
- Cinematography: Rémon Fromont
- Edited by: Ludo Troch
- Music by: Michel Herr; Archie Shepp
- Release date: September 1993
- Running time: 96 minutes
- Countries: Belgium; Netherlands
- Languages: French; Dutch
- Box office: $45.000

Just Friends is a 1993 Belgian-Dutch film. It was directed and produced by Marc-Henri Wajnberg, written by Pierre Sterckx and Alexandre Wajnberg, and starred Josse De Pauw, Ann-Gisel Glass, Charles Berling, and Sylvie Milhaud. Set in Antwerp, Just Friends is about the jazz scene in the 1950s.

The film received the André Cavens Award and won three Joseph Plateau Awards, including Best Film and Best Director for Wajnberg. It was selected as the Belgian entry for the Best Foreign Language Film at the 66th Academy Awards.

The music was written and supervised by Michel Herr and featured saxophonist Archie Shepp.

== See also ==
- List of Belgian submissions for the Academy Award for Best Foreign Language Film
- List of submissions to the 66th Academy Awards for Best Foreign Language Film
