= Khadak (2006 film) =

- Directed by: Jessica Hope Woodworth, Peter Brosens
- Produced by: Byamba Sakhya (Mongolia), Od Howell (Europe)
- Starring: Batzul Khayankhyarvaa, Tsetsegee Byamba, Damchaa Banzar, Tserendarizav Dashnyam
- Cinematography: Rimvydas Leipus
- Edited by: Nico Leunen
- Music by: Altan Urag, Dominique Lawalrée, Michel Schöpping, Christian Fennesz and J. S. Bach
- Distributed by: LifeSize Entertainment (USA)
- Release date: 2006
- Running time: 104 min
- Countries: Belgium, Germany, Netherlands
- Language: Mongolian

Khadak is a 2006 Belgian/Dutch/German drama film directed by Peter Brosens and Jessica Woodworth.

== Production ==
The idea of Khadak was born in 1999 when Peter Brosens was filming the last part of his Mongolian trilogy, Poets of Mongolia. In Mongolia he met Jessica Woodworth, who was working on her documentary Urga's Song. Together they started researching a documentary about aviation and socialism in Mongolia, but soon felt that the one-hour time frame of a documentary could not accommodate the ideas they wanted to express.

The movie was co-produced by Germany (Ma.Ja.De Filmproduktions-GmbH) and the Netherlands (Lemming Film).

== Plot ==
The film is set in the steppes of Mongolia and takes place during winter in the latter half of the 20th century. It explores the events which concern Bagi, a nomadic herder, during his coming of age and the forced relocation of his people.

Bagi has epilepsy and is subject to fits which cause visions and out-of-body experiences. When local officials claim that a disease is killing the livestock his family relies on, Bagi and many others are forcibly relocated and made to work at an open pit mine mining coal. Eventually, Bagi meets a woman named Zolzaya, who participates in raids against the freight trains which transport coal away from the facility. As Bagi fights to overcome his epilepsy, together with Zolzaya he leads a group of young people who try to disrupt the mining operations and enliven the despondent populace to return to their nomadic lifestyle.

== Cast ==
- Batzul Khayankhyarvaa as Bagi
- Tsetsgee Byambaa as Zolzaya
- Banzar Damchaa as Grandfather
- Tserendarizav Dashnyam as Shamaness
- Dugarsuren Dagvadorj as Mother
- Uuriintuya Enkhtaivan as Naraa

== Music ==
Some of the music in this film is composed and performed by the Mongolian band Altan Urag.

== Release and awards ==
Khadak was screened numerous film festivals around the world, including Toronto and Sundance. It won 20 prizes and notably — the Lion of the Future – “Luigi De Laurentiis” Award for a Debut Film at the 63rd Venice International Film Festival.
