= Jessica Woodworth =

Belgian--American filmmaker (born 1971)

Jessica Hope Woodworth
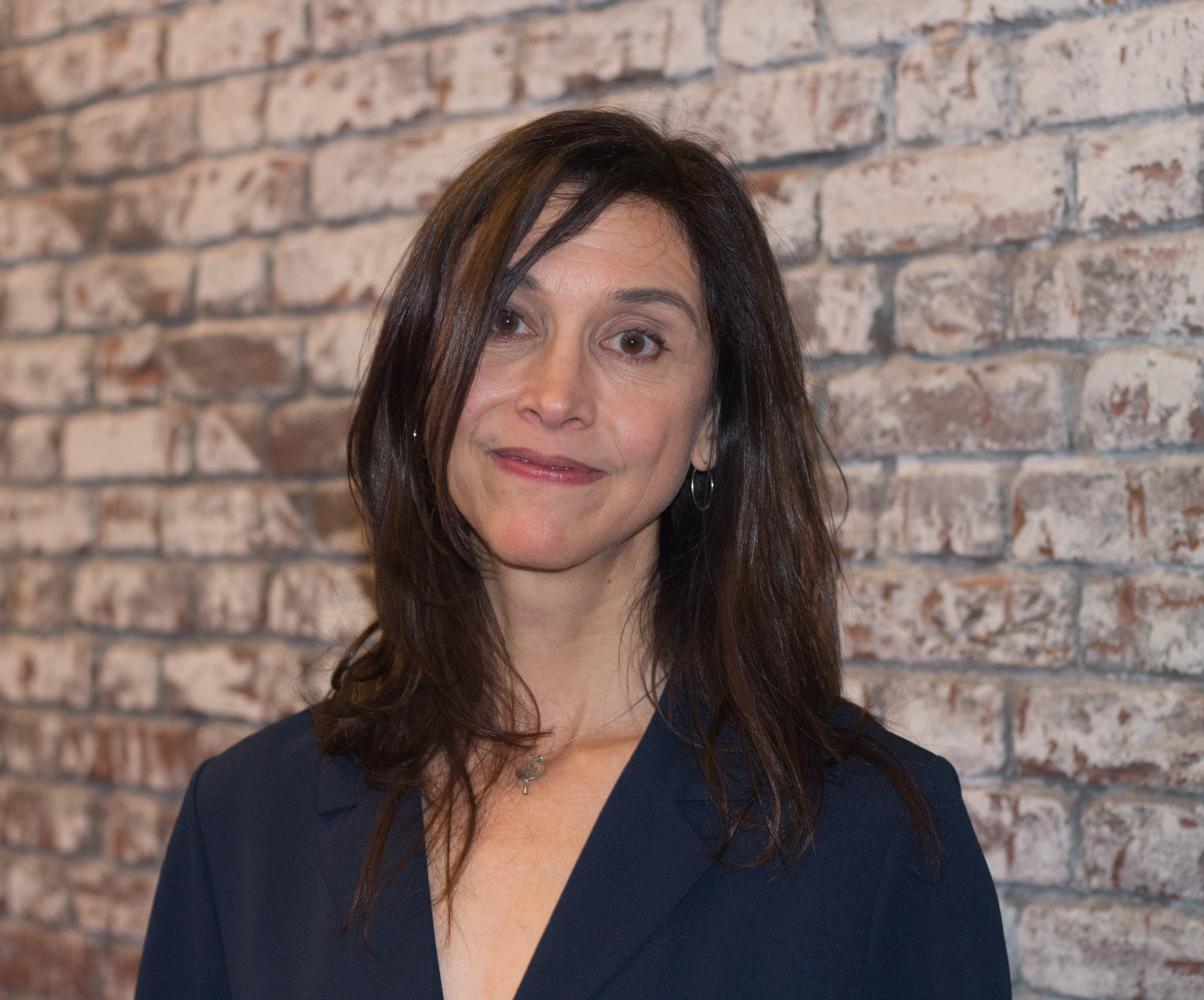
- Born: 1971 (age 54–55); Brussels
- Occupations: Actress, film director, screenwriter
- Years active: 1994—present

Jessica Hope Woodworth is a Belgian-American film director, screenwriter, and producer.

== Biography ==
Woodworth studied Classic Theatre and Literature at the University of Princeton (graduated in 1993), she also holds a master's degree in Documentary Film from Stanford University (1999). In 1994 she started working in television in Paris, then moved to Hong Kong where she was a producer and screenwriter for educational films and documentaries. Her thesis for Stanford, Urga Song documentary, was made in Mongolia. The film was screened at several prestigious film festivals around the world. After that, she received a Fulbright grant that she used for her next project, The Virgin Diaries, shot in Morocco and premiered at the International Documentary Film Festival Amsterdam.

In 1999, while filming Urga Song in Mongolia, she met Peter Brosens, a fellow director, who was working on the third part of his 'Mongolia Trilogy'. They married in Germany in 2000. In 2005, Brosens and Woodworth co-founded Bo Films, a production company based in Ghent. Since 2006, they have co-directed five features. Their first movie, Mongolia-based Khadak, became a great success and won 20 prizes at various festivals, including the Luigi De Laurentiis Award at the 63rd Venice International Film Festival.

Their next film, Altiplano, was shot high in the Andes. Based on a real life incident, the plot is centered on two female leads, a photojournalist Grace married to a doctor who works in a local village, and Saturnina, a young Peruvian Indian who lost her betrothed because of a mercury spillage caused by mining.

In 2016 Woodworth and Brosens released their first comedy, King of the Belgians. The road movie about a monarch lost in the Balkans became an international hit and won numerous awards. The film premiered at the Cannes Critics’ Week in 2009, it won KNF Award at the International Rotterdam film festival, and took Grand Prix at the Bangkok IFF. King of the Belgians was followed by a sequel, The Barefoot Emperor.

In 2021 she started working on her first solo feature, Luka. The movie was produced by Bo Films. The plot was adapted from Dino Buzzati’s novel The Tartar Steppe. The leading role was given to the young Dutch actor Jonas Smulders. In 2023, Luka premiered at the Big Screen Competition at the International Rotterdam film festival.

== Filmography ==
Woodworth has released a dozen of features that have been screened in over 350 festivals and received over 70 awards.

- Urga Song (1999);
- The Virgin Diaries (2002);
- Khadak (2006), with Peter Brosens;
- Artiplano (2009), with Peter Brosens;
- The Fifth Season (2012) with Peter Brosens;
- King of the Belgians;
- The Barefoot Emperor (2019), with Peter Brosens;
- Luka (2023).
