= Luka (2023 film) =

2023 film directed by Jessica Woodworth

- Directed by: Jessica Woodworth
- Screenplay by: Jessica Woodworth
- Based on: The Tartar Steppe by Dino Buzzati
- Produced by: Peter Brosens; Jessica Woodworth
- Cinematography: Virginie Surdej
- Edited by: David Verdurme
- Music by: Teho Teardo
- Release date: 19 January 2023 (International Film Festival Rotterdam)
- Running time: 94 minutes
- Country: Belgium
- Language: English

Luka is a 2023 drama film directed by Jessica Woodworth and starring Jonas Smulders.

== Plot ==
Set in a fictional country, the film follows a soldier who arrives as a recruit to a fortress stronghold that exists to hold off an unseen enemy.

== Cast ==
- Jonas Smulders as Luka
- Geraldine Chaplin as The General
- Jan Bijvoet as Sergeant Major Raf
- Sam Louwyck as Master Tailor Gaston
- Valentin Ganev as Commander Gor
- Goua Robert Grovogui as Bogdan
- Kevin Lettieri as Magnus
- Django Schrevens as Geronimo
- Samvel Tadevossian as Konstantin
- Haruhiko Yamanouchi as The Duke

== Production ==
The film is loosely based on the novel The Tartar Steppe by Dino Buzzati and was filmed in Sicily and Bulgaria. It was produced by Peter Brosens of the Belgian company Bo Films with co-producers in several other countries. It is in black-and-white.

== Reception ==
Screen described Luka as "atmospheric" and "visually arresting" but "dramatically unengaging", with a second half that plays "like an arthouse-oriented, lo-fi cousin of Denis Villeneuve's Dune". Jonathan Romney of Sight and Sound wrote that the film succeeds at looking otherworldly but fails to captivate viewers through "an antique flavour of Europudding in the mix of accents" and "sometimes impassive, sometimes overstated acting that loses its energy in the sound mix".
