= The Desert of the Tartars =

1976 film

- Directed by: Valerio Zurlini
- Written by: Jean-Louis Bertucelli
- Screenplay by: André G. Brunelin
- Based on: The Tartar Steppe by Dino Buzzati
- Produced by: Michelle de Broca; Bahman Farmanara; Enzo Giulioli
- Starring: Vittorio Gassman; Jacques Perrin; Helmut Griem
- Cinematography: Luciano Tovoli
- Edited by: Raimondo Crociani
- Music by: Ennio Morricone
- Production company: Cinecittà Studios
- Distributed by: Filmverlag der Autoren; Quartet Films; NoShame Films
- Release date: 29 October 1976 (Italy)
- Running time: 147 minutes
- Countries: Italy; France; West Germany; Iran
- Language: Italian

The Desert of the Tartars (Italian: Il deserto dei Tartari) is a 1976 Italian film by director Valerio Zurlini with an international cast including Jacques Perrin, Vittorio Gassman, Max von Sydow, Francisco Rabal, Philippe Noiret, Fernando Rey, and Jean-Louis Trintignant. The cast also included veteran Iranian film actor Mohammad-Ali Keshavarz.

Based on Dino Buzzati's novel The Tartar Steppe and set in about 1900, it tells the story of a young officer in an unnamed army who is sent to an ancient fortress that guards the desert frontier with the Tartars. Filmed in Arg-e Bam, Iran and released on 29 October 1976 in Italy, it was later shown as part of the Cannes Classics section of the 2013 Cannes Film Festival.

The film's striking visual style, noted for its scenery, lighting, and cinematography, was influenced by the work of Italian painter Giorgio de Chirico. The score was by Ennio Morricone.

== Plot ==
The first posting of the young lieutenant Drogo is to a remote medieval castle on the frontier of the empire, facing the empty desert of the ferocious Tartars. In this lonely outpost, though no enemy appears, the garrison solemnly goes through all the rituals of military life. Isolation and stress erode them mentally and physically, leading to erratic behaviour and illness. The officers bicker continually and a platoon of soldiers mutinies when one of them is shot for alleged desertion. The commanding officer rides into the desert alone and shoots himself. In the end Drogo too falls ill and, put into a carriage to take him back to civilization, collapses dead.

== Cast ==
- Jacques Perrin: Lt. Drogo
- Vittorio Gassman: Col. Filimore
- Giuliano Gemma: Maj. Matis
- Helmut Griem: Lt. Simeon
- Philippe Noiret: the General
- Fernando Rey: Lt. Col. Nathanson
- Laurent Terzieff: Lt. von Hamerling
- Jean-Louis Trintignant: Surgeon Maj. Rovine
- Max von Sydow: Cpt. Ortiz
- Giuseppe Pambieri: Lt. Rathenau
- Francisco Rabal: Sgt. Maj. Tronk
- Lilla Brignone: Drogo's mother

== Awards ==
=== Won ===
- David di Donatello Awards 1977:
  - David Award – Best Director: Valerio Zurlini
  - David Award – Best Film
  - Special David Award – Best Actor: Giuliano Gemma
- Italian National Syndicate of Film Journalists 1977:
  - Silver Ribbon Award – Best Director: Valerio Zurlini

=== Nominated ===
- Italian National Syndicate of Film Journalists 1977:
  - Silver Ribbon Award – Best Supporting Actor: Giuliano Gemma
