= 63rd Venice International Film Festival =

Italian film festival in 2006

- Festival poster
- Opening film: The Black Dahlia
- Closing film: The Island
- Location: Venice, Italy
- Founded: 1932
- Awards: Golden Lion: Still Life
- Hosted by: Isabella Ferrari
- Artistic director: Marco Müller
- Festival date: 30 August – 9 September 2006
- Website: Website

Venice Film Festival chronology
- 64th 62nd

The 63rd annual Venice International Film Festival, was held from 30 August to 9 September 2006, at Venice Lido in Italy.

French actress Catherine Deneuve was the jury president for the main competition. Italian actress Isabella Ferrari was the host of both ceremonies. The Golden Lion was awarded to Still Life by Jia Zhangke.

The Golden Lion for Lifetime Achievement was awarded to American filmmaker David Lynch who also presented Inland Empire out of competition, his last feature film.

For the first time since the Second World War, all of the films entered into the main competition were shown as world premieres.

The festival opened with The Black Dahlia by Brian De Palma, and closed with The Island by Pavel Lungin.

== Juries ==
=== Main Competition (Venezia 63) ===
- Catherine Deneuve, French actress - Jury President
- Paulo Branco, Portuguese producer
- Cameron Crowe, American filmmaker and producer
- Chulpan Khamatova, Russian actress
- Juan Josè Bigas Luna, Spanish director and writer
- Park Chan-wook, South Korean filmmaker
- Michele Placido, Italian actor and director

=== Orizzonti ===
- Philip Gröning, German fillmaker - Jury President
- Carlo Carlei, Italian director
- Giuseppe Genna, Italian writer
- Keiko Kusakabe, Japanese producer and distributor
- Yousry Nasrallah, Egyptian director

=== Opera Prima ("Luigi de Laurentiis" Award for a Debut Film) ===
- Paula Wagner, American producer - Jury President
- Guillermo del Toro, Mexican filmmaker
- Mohsen Makhmalbaf, Iranian filmmaker and producer
- Andrei Plakhov, Russian critic
- Stefania Rocca, Italian actress

=== Short Film Competition (Corto Cortissimo) ===
- Teboho Mahlatsi, South African director and producer - Jury President
- Francesca Calvelli, Italian editor
- Aleksey Fedorchenko, Russian director

== Official Sections ==
=== In Competition ===
The following films were selected for the main competition:

English title	Original title	Director(s)	Production country
Black Book	Zwartboek	Paul Verhoeven	Netherlands, Germany, United Kingdom
The Black Dahlia (opening film)		Brian De Palma	United States, Germany
Bobby		Emilio Estevez	United States
Children of Men		Alfonso Cuarón	United Kingdom, United States, Japan
Dry Season	Daratt	Mahamat Saleh Haroun	Chad, France, Belgium, Austria
Euphoria	Эйфория	Ivan Vyrypaev	Russia
Exiled	放‧逐	Johnnie To	Hong Kong, China
Falling	Fallen	Barbara Albert	Austria
The Fountain		Darren Aronofsky	United States
Golden Door	Nuovomondo	Emanuele Crialese	Italy, France
Hollywoodland		Allen Coulter	United States
I Don't Want to Sleep Alone	黑眼圈	Tsai Ming-liang	Malaysia, Taiwan
The Missing Star	La stella che non c'è	Gianni Amelio	Italy
Mushishi	蟲師	Katsuhiro Otomo	Japan
Paprika	パプリカ	Satoshi Kon	Japan
Private Fears in Public Places	Cœurs	Alain Resnais	France, Italy
Private Property	Nue Propriété	Joachim Lafosse	Belgium, Luxembourg, France
The Queen		Stephen Frears	United Kingdom
Still Life	三峡好人	Jia Zhangke	China
Syndromes and a Century	Sang sattawat	Apichatpong Weerasethakul	Thailand, France
These Encounters of Theirs	Quei loro incontri	Jean-Marie Straub, Danièle Huillet	Italy, France
The Untouchable	L'intouchable	Benoît Jacquot	France

=== Out of Competition ===
The following films were selected to be screened out of competition:

English title	Original title	Director(s)	Production country
The Banquet	夜宴	Feng Xiaogang	China
Belle Toujours		Manoel de Oliveira	Portugal, France
The Devil Wears Prada		David Frankel	United States
A Few Days in September	Quelques jours en septembre	Santiago Amigorena	France, Italy
Inland Empire		David Lynch	United States, Poland, France
The Island (closing film)	Остров	Pavel Lungin	Russia
The Magic Flute		Kenneth Branagh	United Kingdom, France
Tales from Earthsea	ゲド戦記	Goro Miyazaki	Japan
World Trade Center		Oliver Stone	United States
Out of Competition – Midnight
The City of Violence	짝패	Ryoo Seung-wan	South Korea
Have You Another Apple?	Baaz ham sib daari?	Bayram Fazli	Iran
Retribution	叫	Kiyoshi Kurosawa	Japan
Rob-B-Hood	寶貝計劃	Benny Chan	China
Summer Love		Piotr Uklański	Poland
To Let	Para entrar a vivir	Jaume Balagueró	Spain
The Wicker Man		Neil LaBute	United States
Special event
Letters from the Sahara	Lettere dal Sahara	Vittorio De Seta	Italy

=== Orizzonti ===
The following films were selected for the Horizons (Orizzonti) section:

English title	Original title	Director(s)	Production country
Fiction
Crickets	こおろぎ	Shinji Aoyama	Japan
The Hottest State		Ethan Hawke	United States
Tachiguishi retsuden	立喰師列伝	Mamoru Oshii	Japan
El cobrador: In God We Trust		Paul Leduc	Mexico, Argentina, Brasil
Courthouse on the Horseback	马背上的法庭	Liu Jie	China
Don't Make Any Plans for Tonight	Non prendere impegni stasera	Gianluca Maria Tavarelli	Italy
Free Floating	Свободное плавание	Boris Khlebnikov	Russia
Heimat Fragments: The Women	Heimat-Fragmente: Die Frauen	Edgar Reitz	Germany
I Am the One Who Brings Flowers to Her Grave	Ana alati tahmol azouhour ila qabriha	Hala Alabdalla Yakoub, Ammar Al Beik	Syria, France
Infamous		Douglas McGrath	United States
Quijote		Mimmo Paladino	Italy
Rain Dogs	Taiyang yu	Ho Yuhang	Malaysia, Hong Kong
Requiem from Java	Opera Jawa	Garin Nugroho	Indonesia
Rome Rather Than You	Roma wa la n’touma	Tariq Teguia	Algeria, France
Suely in the Sky	O Céu de Suely	Karim Aïnouz	Brasil
Documentaries
Bellissime 2 – Dagli anni Sessanta ad oggi		Giovanna Gagliardo	Italy
Dong	东	Jia Zhangke	China
The U.S. vs. John Lennon		David Leaf, John Scheinfeld	United States
When the Leeves Broke: A Requiem in Four Acts		Spike Lee	United States
Special events
Akamas		Panicos Chrysanthou	Cyprus, Greece, Hungary, Turkey
C’est Gradiva qui vous appelle		Alain Robbe-Grillet	France, Belgium
Kill Gil 2		Gil Rossellini	Italy, Switzerland
Il mio paese		Daniele Vicari	Italy
Pasolini prossimo nostro		Giuseppe Bertolucci	Italy, France

=== Corto Cortissimo ===
The following films were selected for the Short Films Competition (Corto Cortissimo):

Original Title	Director(s)	Production country
Levelek	Ferenc Cakó	Hungary
Comment on freine dans une descente?	Alix Delaporte	France
The Making of Parts	Daniel Elliott	United Kingdom
Detektive	Andreas Goldstein	Germany
Treinta Años	Nicolás Lasnibat	France, Chile
Um Ano Mais Longo	Marco Martins	Portugal
Mum	Mads Matthiesen	Denmark
"Faça sua Escolha"	Paula Miranda	Brazil
Pharmakon	Ioakim Mylonas	Cyprus
Rien ne va plus	Katja Pratschke and Gusztáv Hàmos	Germany
Trillizas Propaganda	Fernando Salem	Argentina
Simanei Derech	Shimon Shai	Israel
Fib 1477	Lorenzo Sportiello	Italy
What Does Your Daddy Do?	Martin Stitt	United Kingdom
Eva reste au placard les nuits de pleine lune	Alex Stockman	Belgium
In the Eye Abides the Hear	Mary Sweeney	United States
Adults only	Joon Han Yeo	Malaysia
Out of competition
Sekalli sa Meokgo	Teboho Mahlatsi	South Africa

Highlighted title indicates Lion for Best Short Film winner.

=== Retrospective - The Secret Story of Russian cinema ===
Special retrospective section of the Russian cinema, from 1934 to 1974:

Original title	English title	Director(s)	Production country
Гармонь (1934)	Accordion	Igor Savchenko	Soviet Union
Весёлые ребята (1934)	Jolly Fellows	Grigori Aleksandrov	Soviet Union
Цирк (1936)	Circus	Grigori Aleksandrov	Soviet Union
Богатая невеста (1938)	The Country Bride	Ivan Pyryev	Soviet Union
Волга-Волга (1938)	Volga-Volga	Grigori Aleksandrov	Soviet Union
Трактористы (1939)	Tractor Drivers	Ivan Pyryev	Soviet Union
Музыкальная история (1940)	Musical Story	Aleksandr Ivanovsky, Herbert Rappaport	Soviet Union
Светлый путь (1940)	Tanya	Grigori Aleksandrov	Soviet Union
Свинарка и пастух (1941)	They Met in Moscow	Ivan Pyryev	Soviet Union
В 6 часов вечера после войны (1944)	Six P.M.	Ivan Pyryev	Soviet Union
Весна (1947)	Springtime	Grigori Aleksandrov	Soviet Union
Кубанские казаки (1950)	Cossacks of the Kuban	Ivan Pyryev	Soviet Union
Щедрое лето (1950)	Bountiful Summer	Boris Barnet	Soviet Union
Карнавальная ночь (1956)	Carnival Night	Eldar Ryazanov	Soviet Union
Наш милый доктор (1957)	Our Dear Doctor	Shaken Aimanov	Soviet Union
Черёмушки (1962)	Cherry Town	Herbert Rappaport	Soviet Union
Спасите утопающего (1967)	Save the Drowning Man	Pavel Arsenov	Soviet Union
Романс о влюблённых (1974)	A Lover's Romance	Andrei Konchalovsky	Soviet Union

=== Retrospective - Joaquim Pedro de Andrade ===
This is a special section dedicated to the Brazilian filmmaker Joaquim Pedro de Andrade, one of the fathers of Cinema Novo. His daughter, Alice de Andrade, also a producer, restored the fourteen works that constitute all of her father's filmography.

English title	Original title	Director	Production country
Feature films
Garrincha: Hero of the Jungle (1963)	Garrincha, Alegria do Povo	Joaquim Pedro de Andrade	Brazil
The Priest and the Girl (1966)	O Padre e a Moça	Joaquim Pedro de Andrade	Brazil
Macunaíma (1969)		Joaquim Pedro de Andrade	Brazil
The Conspirators (1972)	Os Inconfidentes	Joaquim Pedro de Andrade	Brazil
Conjugal Warfare (1975)	Guerra Conjugal	Joaquim Pedro de Andrade	Brazil
O Homen do Pau-Brasil (1981)		Joaquim Pedro de Andrade	Brazil
Short Films
O Mestre de Apipucos (1959)		Joaquim Pedro de Andrade	Brazil
O Poeta do Castelo (1959)		Joaquim Pedro de Andrade	Brazil
Couro de Gato (1960)		Joaquim Pedro de Andrade	Brazil
Cinéma Nôvo (1967)		Joaquim Pedro de Andrade	Brazil
Brasilia, Contradições de Uma Cidade Nova (1967)		Joaquim Pedro de Andrade	Brazil
Linguagem da Persuasão (1970)		Joaquim Pedro de Andrade	Brazil
Vereda Tropical (1977)		Joaquim Pedro de Andrade	Brazil
O Aleijadinho (1978)		Joaquim Pedro de Andrade	Brazil

=== Retrospective - Secret History of Italian Cinema 3 ===
Special retrospective section to the Italian cinema, from 1937 to 1979. This is the third part of the retrospective of Italian Film, initiated at the 61st Venice International Film Festival.

English title	Original title	Director(s)	Restoration
Centennial of Rossellini, Soldati and Visconti
In High Places (1942)	Quartieri alti	Mario Soldati	Cineteca Nazionale
Obsession (1943)	Ossessione	Luchino Visconti	Cineteca Nazionale, Ripley's Film, SKY Italia
Rome, Open City (1945)	Roma, città aperta	Roberto Rossellini	Cineteca Nazionale, Department of Cultural Policies of the City of Rome, Cinecittà Digital
Escape to France (1948)	Fuga in Francia	Mario Soldati	Cineteca Nazionale
Anna Magnani, episode from We, the Women (1953)		Luchino Visconti	Cineteca Nazionale, Ripley's Film
Ingrid Bergman, episode from We, the Women (1953)		Roberto Rossellini	Cineteca Nazionale, Ripley's Film
General Della Rovere (1959)	Il generale della Rovere	Roberto Rossellini	Cineteca Nazionale, Gruppo Editoriale Minerva – Raro Video, National Museum of Cinema of Torino, Historical Archive of the Biennale, LVR
The secret story of Italian cinema
The Ferocious Saladin (1937)	Il feroce Saladino	Mario Bonnard	Cineteca Italiana, National Museum of Cinema of Torino, Cineteca of Bologna – Laboratorio L'Immagine Ritrovata
For a Few Dollars More (1965)	Per qualche dollaro in più	Sergio Leone	Cineteca di Bologna – Laboratorio L'Immagine Ritrovata, SKY Italia
From the Clouds to the Resistance (1979)	Dalla nube alla resistenza	Jean-Marie Straub, Danièle Huillet	Only copy of this archive is at the Cineteca of Bologna

== Independent Sections ==
=== Venice International Film Critics' Week ===
The following feature films were selected to be screened as In Competition for the 21st Venice International Film Critics' Week:

English title	Original title	Director(s)	Production country
In Competition
El Amarillo		Sergio Mazza	Argentina
My One and Onlies	Egyetleneim	Gyula Nemes	Hungary
A Guide to Recognizing Your Saints		Dito Montiel	United States
Hyena	Hiena	Grzegorz Lewandowski	Poland
Premonition	Le Pressentiment	Jean-Pierre Darroussin	France
On the Trail of Igor Rizzi	Sur la trace d'Igor Rizzi	Noël Mitrani	Canada
Do over	Yi Nian Zhichu	Yu-Chieh Cheng	Taiwan
Special Event
The Rieducation	La rieducazione	Davide Alfonsi, Alessandro Fusto, Denis Malagnino	Italy
Homage to Otto Preminger
Bunny Lake is Missing		Otto Preminger	United Kingdom, United States

=== Venice Days ===
The following films were selected for the 3rd edition of Venice Days (Giornate Degli Autori) autonomous section:

English title	Original title	Director(s)	Production country
7 Years	7 Ans	Jean-Pascal Hattu	France
Chicha tu madre		Gianfranco Quattrini	Argentina, Peru
Come l'ombra		Marina Spada	Italy
Dark Blue Almost Black	Azuloscurocasinegro	Daniel Sánchez Arévalo	Spain
Dreams of Dust	Rêves de poussière	Laurent Salgues	Burkina Faso, Canada, France
L'étoile du soldat		Christophe de Ponfilly	France, Germany, Afghanistan
Falkenberg Farewell	Farväl Falkenberg	Jesper Ganslandt	Denmark, Sweden
Khadak		Jessica Woodworth, Peter Brosens	Belgium, Germany, Holland
Meanwhile	Mientras tanto	Diego Lerman	Argentina, France
The Night of the Sunflowers	La noche de los girasoles	Jorge Sánchez-Cabezudo	Spain, Portugal, France
Offscreen		Christoffer Boe	Denmark
L'udienza è aperta		Vincenzo Marra	Italy
WWW - What a Wonderful World		Faouzi Bensaïdi	Morocco, France

== Official Awards ==
=== In Competition (Venezia 63) ===
- Golden Lion: Still Life by Jia Zhangke
- Grand Special Jury Prize: Daratt by Mahamat-Saleh Haroun
- Silver Lion for Best Director: Alain Resnais for Private Fears in Public Places
- Volpi Cup for Best Actor: Ben Affleck for Hollywoodland
- Volpi Cup for Best Actress: Helen Mirren for The Queen
- Silver Lion Revelation: Emanuele Crialese for Golden Door
- Marcello Mastroianni Award for Best Young Actor: Isild Le Besco for The Untouchable
- Golden Osella for Best Cinematography: Emmanuel Lubezki for Children of Men
- Golden Osella for Best ScreenPlay: Peter Morgan for The Queen
- Special Lion: Jean-Marie Straub and Danièle Huillet for their innovation in cinematographic languages

=== Golden Lion for Lifetime Achievement ===
- David Lynch

=== Orizzonti ===
- Best Film: Courthouse on the Horseback by Liu Jie
- Best Documentary: When the Levees Broke: A Requiem in Four Acts by Spike Lee

=== Short Film Competition (Corto Cortissimo) ===
- Silver Lion for Best Short Film: Comment on freine dans une descente? by Alix Delaporte
- UIP Award for the Best European Short Film: The Making of Parts by Daniel Elliott
  - Special Mention: Adults Only by Yeo Joon Han

=== Luigi De Laurentis Award for a Debut Film ===
- Khadak by Peter Brosens & Jessica Woodworth
  - Special mention: 7 Years by Jean-Pascal Hattu

== Independent Sections Awards ==
The following official and collateral awards were conferred to films of the autonomous sections:

=== Venice International Film Critics' Week ===
- Best Film: A Guide to Recognizing Your Saints by Dito Montiel
- Isvema Award: A Guide to Recognizing Your Saints by Dito Montiel

=== Venice Days (Giornate Degli Autori) ===
- Label Europa Cinemas: Dark Blue Almost Black by Daniel Sánchez Arévalo
- Prize Arca Cinemagiovani (Young Cinema Award) – Best Movie "Other Visions": Offscreen by Christoffer Boe
- UAAR Award: Dark Blue Almost Black by Daniel Sánchez Arévalo
- Venice Authors Prize: Chicha tu madre by Gianfranco Quattrini & Mientras tanto by Diego Lerman

== Independent Awards ==
The following collateral awards were conferred to films of the official selection:

=== FIPRESCI Award ===
- Best Film (Main competition): The Queen by Stephen Frears
- Best Film (Horizons): When the Levees Broke: A Requiem in Four Acts by Spike Lee

=== SIGNIS Award ===
- Nuovomondo by Emanuele Crialese
  - Special mention: Dry Season by Mahamat Saleh Haroun
  - Special mention: Private Property by Joachim Lafosse

=== UNICEF Award ===
- Nuovomondo by Emanuele Crialese

=== UNESCO Award ===
- Dry Season by Mahamat Saleh Haroun

=== Francesco Pasinetti Award (SNGCI) ===
- Best Actor: Sergio Castellitto for The Missing Star
- Best Actress: Laura Morante for Private Fears in Public Places
- Best Film: Nuovomondo by Emanuele Crialese

=== Pietro Bianchi Award ===
- Marco Bellocchio

=== FEDIC Award ===
- Nuovomondo by Emanuele Crialese

=== Little Golden Lion ===
- Euphoria by Ivan Vyrypaev

=== Young Cinema Award – Best International Film ===
- Black Book by Paul Verhoeven

=== Wella Prize ===
- Don't Make Any Plans for Tonight by Gianluca Maria Tavarelli

=== Open Prize ===
- Dong by Jia Zhangke

=== Doc/It Award ===
- Dong by Jia Zhangke
- I Am the One Who Brings Flowers to Her Grave by Hala Alabdalla Yakoub and Ammar Al Beik

=== Future Film Festival Digital Award ===
- Inland Empire by David Lynch
  - Special mention: The Banquet by Feng Xiaogang

=== Laterna Magica Prize ===
- Children of Men by Alfonso Cuarón

=== Biografilm Award ===
- Bobby by Emilio Estevez

=== CinemAvvenire Award ===
- Nuovomondo by Emanuele Crialese

=== Cinema for Peace Award ===
- I Don't Want to Sleep Alone by Tsai Ming-liang

=== Award of the City of Rome ===
- Lettere dal Sahara by Vittorio De Seta

=== Human Rights Film Network Award ===
- When the Levees Broke: A Requiem in Four Acts
  - Special mention: Dry Season by Mahamat Saleh Haroun

=== EIUC Award ===
- Dry Season by Mahamat Saleh Haroun

=== Mimmo Rotella Foundation Award ===
- The Missing Star by Gianni Amelio

=== Gucci Award ===
- Nick Cave (screenplay) for The Proposition by John Hillcoat

== The numbers and the nations of the 63rd Show ==
- Number of countries with a film in one of the official sections: 31
- Countries making their first appearance at the film festival Chad, Cyprus and Indonesia
- Number of films displayed: 2,589, including 1,429 full-length feature films
- Number of full-length feature film officially presented: 62
  - During the contest: 21
  - Out of the contest: 9 + 7 midnights + 1 special event
  - Venice Horizons: 19 + 5 special events
