= Waiting for the Barbarians =

1980 novel by J.M. Coetzee

- First edition cover
- Author: J. M. Coetzee
- Language: English
- Genre: Novel
- Publisher: Secker & Warburg
- Publication date: 27 October 1980
- Publication place: South Africa
- Media type: Print (Hardcover & Paperback)
- Pages: 156 (hardcover edition)
- ISBN: 0-436-10295-1 (hardcover edition)
- Dewey Decimal: 823 19
- LC Class: PR9369.3.C58 W3 1980

Waiting for the Barbarians is a novel by the South African writer J. M. Coetzee. First published in 1980, it was chosen by Penguin for its series Great Books of the 20th Century and won both the James Tait Black Memorial Prize and Geoffrey Faber Memorial Prize for fiction. American composer Philip Glass has also written an opera of the same name based on the book which premiered in September 2005 at Theater Erfurt, Germany.

Coetzee is said to have taken the title as well as to have been heavily influenced by the 1904 poem "Waiting for the Barbarians" by the Greek poet Constantine P. Cavafy.

Coetzee's novel was also deeply influenced by Italian writer Dino Buzzati's novel The Tartar Steppe.

== Plot ==
The story is narrated in the first person by the unnamed magistrate of a settlement that exists on the territorial frontier of "The Empire". The Magistrate's rather peaceful existence comes to an end with the Empire's declaration of a state of emergency and with the deployment of the Third Bureau—the special forces of the Empire—due to rumours that the area's indigenous people, called "barbarians" by the people in the settlement, might be preparing to attack the town. Consequently, the Third Bureau conducts an expedition into the land beyond the frontier. Led by the sinister Colonel Joll, the Third Bureau captures a number of barbarians, brings them back to town, tortures them, kills some of them, and leaves for the capital in order to prepare a larger campaign.

In the meantime, the Magistrate begins to question the legitimacy of colonialism and personally nurses a barbarian girl who has been left crippled and partly blinded by the Third Bureau's torturers. He threatens to force the barbarian girl out of the city unless she stays with him. The Magistrate has an intimate yet uncertain relationship with the girl. Eventually, he decides to take her back to her people. After a life-threatening trip through the barren land, during which they have sexual relations, he succeeds in returning her—finally asking, to no avail, if she will stay with him—and returns to his own town. The Third Bureau soldiers have reappeared there and now arrest the Magistrate for having deserted his post and for consorting with "The Enemy". Without much possibility of a trial during such emergency circumstances, the Magistrate remains in a locked cellar for an indefinite period, experiencing for the first time a near-complete lack of basic freedoms. He finally acquires a key that allows him to leave the makeshift jail, but finds that he has no place to escape to and spends most of his time outside the jail scavenging for scraps of food.

Later, Colonel Joll triumphantly returns from the wilderness with several barbarian captives and makes a public spectacle of their torture. Although the crowd is encouraged to participate in their beatings, the Magistrate bursts onto the scene to stop it, but is subdued. Seizing the Magistrate, a group of soldiers hangs him up by his arms, deepening his understanding of colonialistic violence by a personal experience of torture. With the Magistrate's spirit clearly crushed, the soldiers mockingly let him roam freely through the town, knowing he has nowhere else to go. The soldiers, however, begin to flee the town as winter approaches and their campaign against the barbarians collapses. The Magistrate tries to confront Joll on his final return from the wild, but the colonel refuses to speak to him, hastily abandoning the town with the last of the soldiers. The predominant belief in the town is that the barbarians intend to invade soon, and although the soldiers and many civilians have now departed, the Magistrate helps encourage the remaining townspeople to continue their lives and to prepare for the winter. There is no sign of the barbarians by the time the season's first snow falls on the town.

== Awards and nominations ==
After Coetzee won the Nobel Prize in Literature in 2003, Penguin Books named Waiting for the Barbarians for its series "Great Books of the 20th Century". The Nobel Prize committee called Waiting for the Barbarians "a political thriller in the tradition of Joseph Conrad, in which the idealist's naiveté opens the gates to horror". It was nominated for the 1982 Philip K. Dick Award.

== Adaptations ==
The opera by Philip Glass is based on Coetzee's book and Christopher Hampton's libretto adapts the story faithfully. The opera premiered on September 10, 2005, at the Theater of Erfurt, Germany, under the direction of Guy Montavon. The lead role of the Magistrate was sung by British baritone Richard Salter, Colonel Joll by American baritone Eugene Perry, who has starred in a number of Glass operas, and the barbarian girl by Elvira Soukop. The musical director of the premiere was Dennis Russell Davies. As Glass told journalists and the Erfurt audience at a matinée, he sees scary parallels between the opera's story and the Iraq War: a military campaign, scenes of torture, talk about threats to the Empire's peace and safety, but no proof. The Austin Lyric Opera performed the American premiere of Waiting for the Barbarians on January 19, 2007, conducted by Richard Buckley and under the direction of Guy Montavon, who was joined again by Richard Salter and Eugene Perry as the Magistrate and Colonel Joll, respectively, and mezzo-soprano Adriana Zabala as the Barbarian Girl.

In August 2012, the Baxter Theatre in Cape Town presented Alexandre Marine's stage adaptation of the novel. The production toured at Montreal's Segal Centre for Performing Arts in January and February, 2013.

In October 2018, a movie adaptation directed by Ciro Guerra and featuring Mark Rylance, Robert Pattinson, and Johnny Depp began production in Morocco. It was released on August 7, 2020.
