= Altan Urag =

Mongolian folk rock band

Altan Urag Алтан Ураг
- Origin: Mongolia
- Genres: folk metal; Folk rock
- Years active: 2002–present
- Members: B. Erdenebat; M. Chimedtogtokh; C. Gangaa; B. Bolortungalag; B. Burentogs; H. Erdenetsetseg
- Past members: P. Oyunbileg

Altan Urag (/ˈɑːltən ˈjʊəræɡ, ˈæl-/; Mongolian: Алтан Ураг, [ˈaɬtʰəɴ ˈʊɾəq]; lit. "Golden Lineage") is a Mongolian folk rock band. Formed in 2002, the band's musical style combines traditional Mongolian and contemporary influences. They're considered to be the pioneers of Mongolian folk-rock.

Their music has featured in the 2006 film Khadak, the 2007 film Mongol and the Netflix television series Marco Polo.

The members of the band have all been trained in classical Mongolian music. Their performances typically include the morin khuur (horse head fiddle), ikh khuur (grand horse head fiddle), bishguur (traditional horn) and yoochin (a type of hammered dulcimer), khöömii (throat singing) and long song vocals. The band's horsehead fiddles were custom made for the band, and the heads were made to resemble goats, as the band's members believe that the goat is the symbolic "mother of rock music".

Although they make use of electrified instruments, some are explicitly acoustic to maintain what they consider the folk sound, such as the bishguur. Besides alluding to the "basic pitches, melodic structures and timbre" of Mongolian music tradition, they also integrate traditional themes, such as paternal love, the natural landscape, and horses into their songs.

Lhagvasuren Bavuu, is credited as the father of Altan Urag, for supporting them with free studio space at the National Puppet Theatre, as well as advising them to use the monster head design of their morin khuur; different from the traditional style, but Mongolian in origin, as Inderma is fiddle-playing monster from legend.

== Film collaborations ==
According to Erdenebat Bataar, the band's leader, their music used in the scene of Kadak highlighted "social problems facing Mongolians today", as it was set apart from the music used in the rest of the film, emphasizing the issues as distinctively Mongolian.

Contrasting to the music in Mongol, which was produced to have wider commercial appeal, was criticized for using various non-Mongolian elements. In an interview, P. Oyunbileg pointed out that Mongolians weren't happy with how they were portrayed in the film, and Erdenebat pointed out that Mongolians object to the inaccuracies of international portrayals.

The group has toured abroad, including the US.

== Members ==
As of 2011, the band's lineup consisted of:

- Erdenebat Baatar (Erka), leader of band, composer, producer, yoochin, piano,
- M. Chimedtogtokh (Chimdee), pipe, vocals (throat singing)
- Ts. Gangaa (Gangaa), great fiddle, bass
- P. Oyunbileg (Oyunaa), moriin khuur, vocals (throat singing)
- B. Bolortungalag (Tungaa), drums, percussion
- B. Burentogs (Burnee) moriin khuur, vocals (throat singing)
- Kh. Erdenetsetseg (Erka), vocals (long song)

== Discography ==
- Foal's Been Born (2004)
- Made in Altan Urag (2006)
- Hypnotism (2008)
- Blood (2009)
- Nation (2010)
- Once Upon a Time in Mongolia (2010)
- Mongol (2010)

== Awards and nominations ==
Award	Year	Recipient	Category	Result	Ref.
UBS Music Video Awards	2009	Altan Urag for "Araatan"	Best Idea	Won	

== See also ==
- Music of Mongolia
