= Kinshasa Kids =

2012 film

- Directed by: Marc-Henri Wajnberg
- Written by: Marc-Henri Wajnberg
- Produced by: Marc-Henri Wajnberg
- Cinematography: Colin Houben; Danny Elsen
- Edited by: Marie-Hélène Dozo
- Music by: Bebson Elemba, Pepe Kalle
- Production companies: Crescendo Films; Inti Films; Wajnbrosse Productions
- Distributed by: Wajnbrosse Productions
- Release dates: 6 September 2012 (Toronto); 6 February 2013 (Belgium)
- Running time: 85 minutes
- Country: Belgium
- Languages: French; Lingala

Kinshasa Kids is a Belgian drama film, which was screened at several film festivals in 2012 and released on February 6, 2013. The film was written and directed by Marc-Henri Wajnberg.

Set in Kinshasa, Democratic Republic of the Congo, the film focuses on a group of street kids, expelled from their homes after being accused of witchcraft, who form a hip hop group while a documentary crew films their efforts.

The film's cast includes Gabi Bolenge, Bebson Elemba, Joël Eziegue, Emmanuel Fakoko, Mickaël Fataki, Gauthier Kiloko, José Mawanda, Sammy Molebe, Joséphine Nsimba Mpongo, Rachel Mwanza, Emmanuel Ndosi El Bas, Django Abdul Bampu Sumbu, Jean Shaka Tshipamba and Papa Wemba. The film received two nominations at the 4th Magritte Awards, winning Best Editing for Marie-Hélène Dozo.
