= Dong (film) =

- Film poster
- Directed by: Jia Zhangke
- Written by: Jia Zhangke
- Produced by: Yu Lik-wai; Zhu Jiong; Chow Keung; Dan Bo
- Starring: Liu Xiaodong
- Cinematography: Yu Lik-wai; Jia Zhangke; Chow Chi Sang; Tian Li
- Edited by: Kong Jinglei; Zhang Jia
- Music by: Lim Giong
- Distributed by: Xstream Pictures
- Release dates: September 6, 2006 (Venice); November 18, 2006 (Hong Kong)
- Running time: 66 minutes
- Countries: China; Hong Kong
- Languages: Mandarin; Sichuanese; Thai

Dong (simplified Chinese: 东; traditional Chinese: 東; pinyin: dōng; lit. 'East') is a 2006 documentary film by Chinese director, Jia Zhangke. The film follows the artist and actor Liu Xiaodong as he invites Jia to film him while he paints a group of labourers near the Three Gorges Dam (also the subject of Jia's film Still Life) and later a group of women in Bangkok. The film was produced and distributed by Jia's own production company, Xstream Pictures, based out of Hong Kong and Beijing.

Dong was screened at the 2006 63rd Venice International Film Festival as part of its "Horizons" Program, and as part of the 2006 Toronto International Film Festival's "Real-to-Reel" Program. It was filmed in HD digital video.

== Background ==
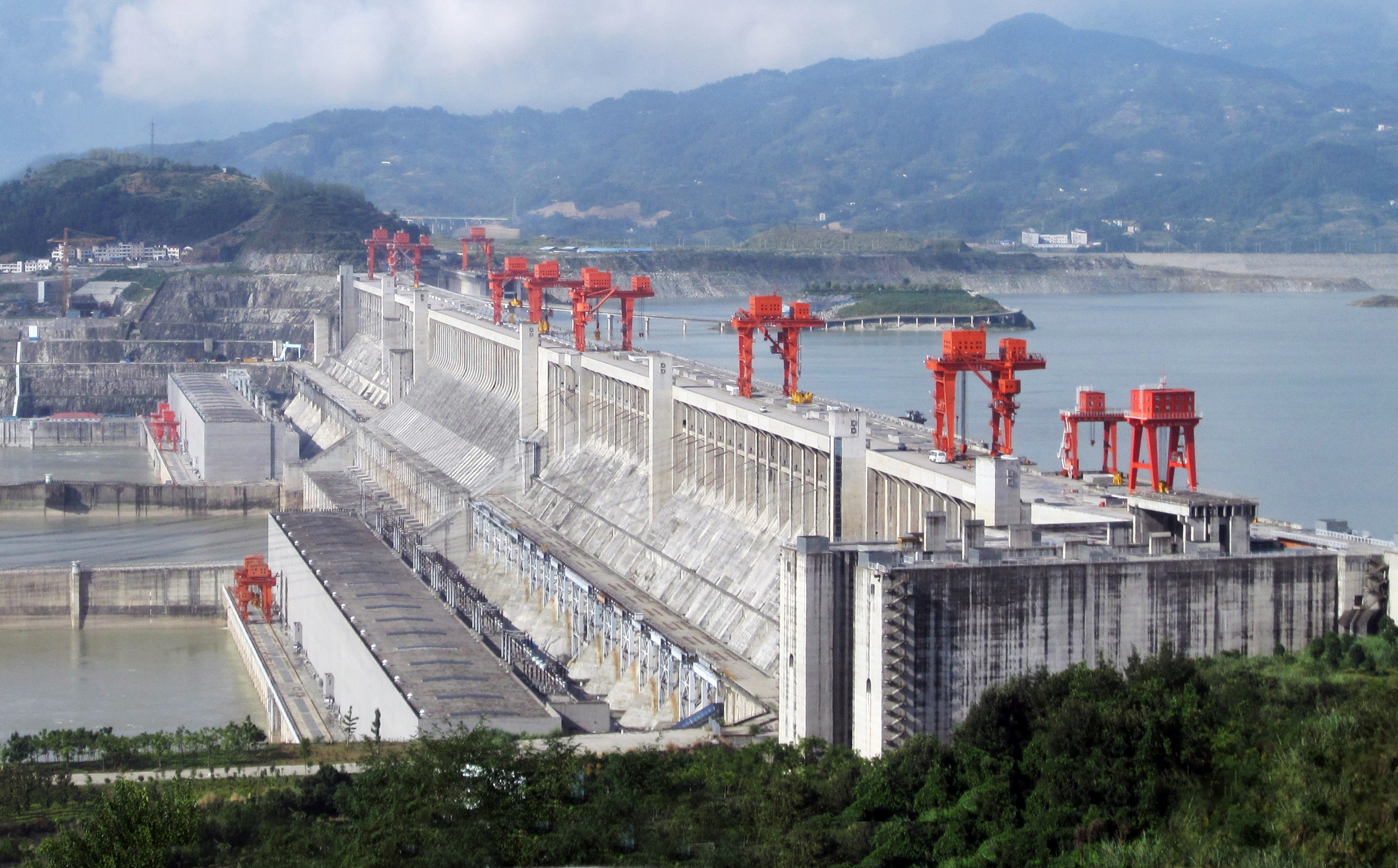
The Three Gorges Dam on the Yangtze River, China.

=== Three Gorges Region ===
The Three Gorges region along the Yangtze River in Fengjie is located in Chongqing, the South-East section of China, it is an old town with a history of more than 2000 years. The Three Gorges Dam being constructed in this region is known as the world’s largest hydropower project and a symbol of “Chinese modernity”, aiming to improve navigation and also produce electricity.

This project was started since 1990s in order to solve energy problems and the water level was required to raise 10 meters high. It causes flooding of towns and villages around the place, with a huge loss of residential areas and cultural heritages, and millions of native residents were then forced to displace to new places. Fengjie as one of the towns firstly being submerged by the water storage system of the power generation project, was relocated to a higher altitude in 2002.

=== Liu Xiaodong ===
Liu Xiaodong is a contemporary Chinese artist born in 1963 in Liaoning Province, China. He is a friend of Dong’s director Jia Zhangke and is also influential on the rise of China’s 6th generation filmmakers. Liu was known as a “documentary painter” since he has collaborated with many Chinese filmmakers and produced more than 20 films around the world to document his progress of paintings.

He mainly focuses his artwork on the living states of workers and labours from the lower class in the society through his portrayal of natural beauty while travelling. His conception to reveal the developing economy in China was explored in his paintings as he moved intimately towards the world, illustrating ordinary people from both urban and rural areas in his motherland.

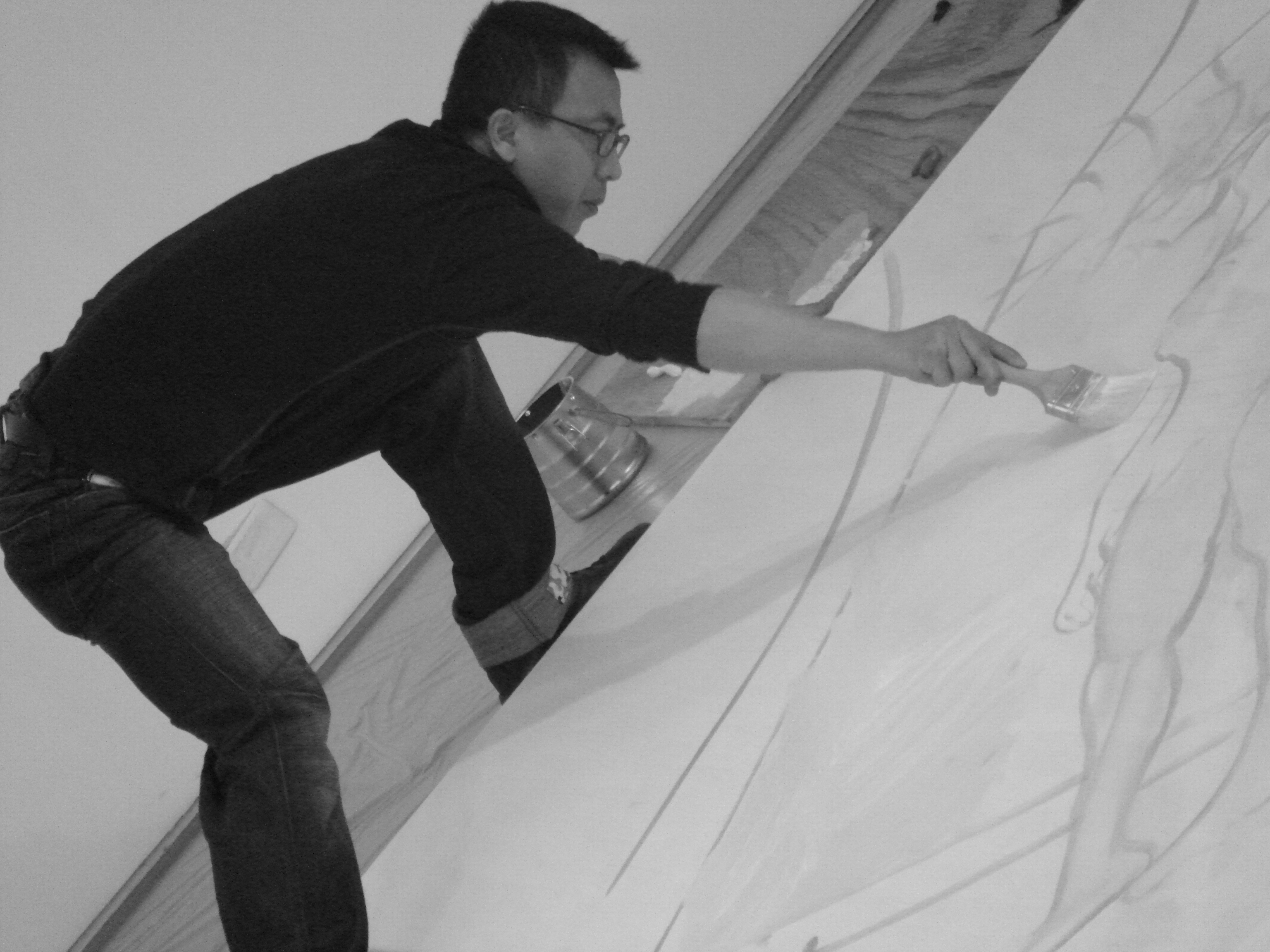
The Chinese artist Liu Xiaodong.

==== Hot Bed ====
Hot Bed is one of Liu Xiaodong’s painting project composed of two parts during his four weeks journey in Fengjie China and Bangkook Thailand. The whole painting is about 10 meters long. In this artwork, Liu demonstrates his objective painting method through portraying the meaningless moment of life to enhance the visual objectivity rather than focusing on the visual perfection.

The first part is an artwork that portrays 11 construction workers working in Fengjie city who were demolishing their own homes in the summer of 2005 after the construction of the hydro-electric power station, and then migrating to other cities afterwards.

In the second part, 12 female sex workers wearing colourful clothes were chosen by Liu in Bangkok. He arranged his models next to fruits and sofa, illustrating a painting with drowsy women under sunshine with tropical fruits.

The bright mattress links two artworks as a medium of temporary rest. It looks like a river flowing underneath two places to protect people. In Liu’s view, it is a warm bed that people could stay to escape shortly from reality.

== Synopsis ==
The documentary is separated into two sections:

The first part took place in the Three Gorges Region in China in 2005, recording down the working process of painter Liu Xiaodong with his painting project ‘Hot Bed’ that portrays the dam workers in the region who were experiencing migration due to the construction of Three Gorges dam. Eleven local workers were his models for the painting while he visited Fengjie during the construction of the project, and they were playing cards and resting in swimming trunks before their homes being deconstructed.

The second part then follows Liu’s journey in Bangkok, Thailand in 2006 where he invited 11 female sex workers being his models for another painting. The tropical and drowsy atmosphere of the city was portrayed under his sketch of women and fruits. He also draws down two blind men who were walking through the crowded market.

Rivers in both cities demonstrate their attitudes of lives moving forward without returning.

Several interviews are conducted in both sections to share Liu’s conception and ideology in his artwork, demonstrating his connection with the world.

== Central Theme ==
=== Issues in China ===
==== Class ====
Dong as a realistic documentary, reveals how the resilience of people living in poverty is able to help them suffer their struggling lives. The daily reality of low-class people in contemporary Chinese society has been illustrated through Jia’s ability to tell ordinary stories in an empathetic way. Both director Jia and the painter Liu concerned with modern realistic social situations through their vision of art and culture and aiming to portray them in their painting and filming.

==== Geographical Construction Impacts ====
The living circumstances of people impacted by the hydropower project along the Yangtze River of Three Gorges Region were reflected, which many towns are flooded, and residents were forced to leave their homes and migrant to completely new places. It reveals the effect of economic development in China has drawn on local residents from lower class, which China's fast-paced development and construction has resulted in issues affected local residents.

=== Fusion Cinema ===
Dong as a hybrid genre documentary emphasises Jia’s conception of fusion cinema. People would look at his characters subjectively through each different view of the world rather than only accepting truth from it. The appearance of fictional scenes within Dong shows how Jia departs from audiences’ expectation of traditional documentaries, questioning film genres as a form of label.

=== Realism ===
Jia mentions in his interview with Variety that documentary is about helping people to “understand and remember what we’ve lived through”.

Jia was frustrated by the limitation of realism when he was filming Dong and he sees realism as an expanding concept, a way of thinking rather than simply a style. He inserted fictional elements inside the film and explains that surrealism should also be added to show a more realistic perspective on the fastness of China’s development and transformation.

== Relationship with Still Life ==
The fictional film Still Life also directed by Jia Zhangke has two parallel storylines of a coal worker and a nurse who came to Fengjie from Shanxi (where Jia was born) to find their spouses who left them years ago. It creates Jia’s connection as an outsider with Fengjie, since he relates himself into the place and local people through this film. It won the 2006 Golden Lion at the 63rd Venice International Film Festival.

Filmed at the same time as Jia's fiction film, Still Life, Dong also shares the same setting (the Three Gorges area of central China) and in certain instances, the same shots. This causes them to make a closely linked relationship with each other. Jia mentions once in his interview that he has always been trying to “knock down the barrier between documentary and fiction”. He portrays the documentary with a more subjective view and reflects the realistic perspective in the fictional film Still Life, overstepping the boundaries between fiction and non-fiction films.

=== Han San Ming ===
Han Sanming, one of the leads in Still Life, also appears (in character) within Dong as do other characters from that film. He is a key connection between two films. The difference is that Han was presented with a more realistic view in the documentary Dong as a model of Liu Xiaodong’s artwork but a more subjective protagonist in the fictional film Still Life, the diverse perspectives of this character reveals the complexity of Jia’s cinema. It allows audiences to look closely at the relationship of his work between realism and fiction. Jia further explains that both him and Liu Xiaodong cherish those workers being models of their artwork, and he decided to cast Han in his fictional film after seeing him being portrayed on Liu’s canvas.

Dong generated less publicity, prompting one critic to deride it as a "minor addition" to Jia Zhangke's canon. In comparison, Still Life has achieved more stunning feedback due to more of the director’s connection with the film.

== Production ==
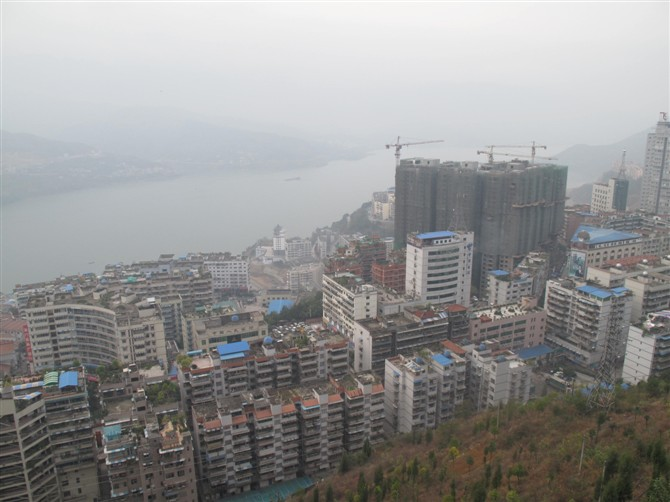
Overlook of Fengjie city in Chongqing China.

=== Behind the Scene ===
==== In Fengjie ====
Jia Zhangke was invited by his friend, painter Liu Xiaodong at first to visit the Three Gorges Region located in South-east of China together, planning to film a documentary for the progress of his new painting series that mainly focuses on the demolition workers in that area and then towards Bangkok to paint female bar workers.

After their arrival, Jia decided to film another fictional film as well due to his shock of the poverty circumstances in the area, and this decision during their journey then successfully form two films in parallels, the documentary Dong and the fictional film Still Life.

Jia wrote the script for Still Life in three days in his hotel, and cast his cousin Han Sanming as a coal miner.

One of Liu’s worker model accidentally died during the process of filming, Liu and Jia then visited this worker’s family, gave photographs and gifts to his children.

Two films shared some similar footage and also the same protagonist under Jia’s exploration of the setting China Fengjie.

==== In Bangkok ====
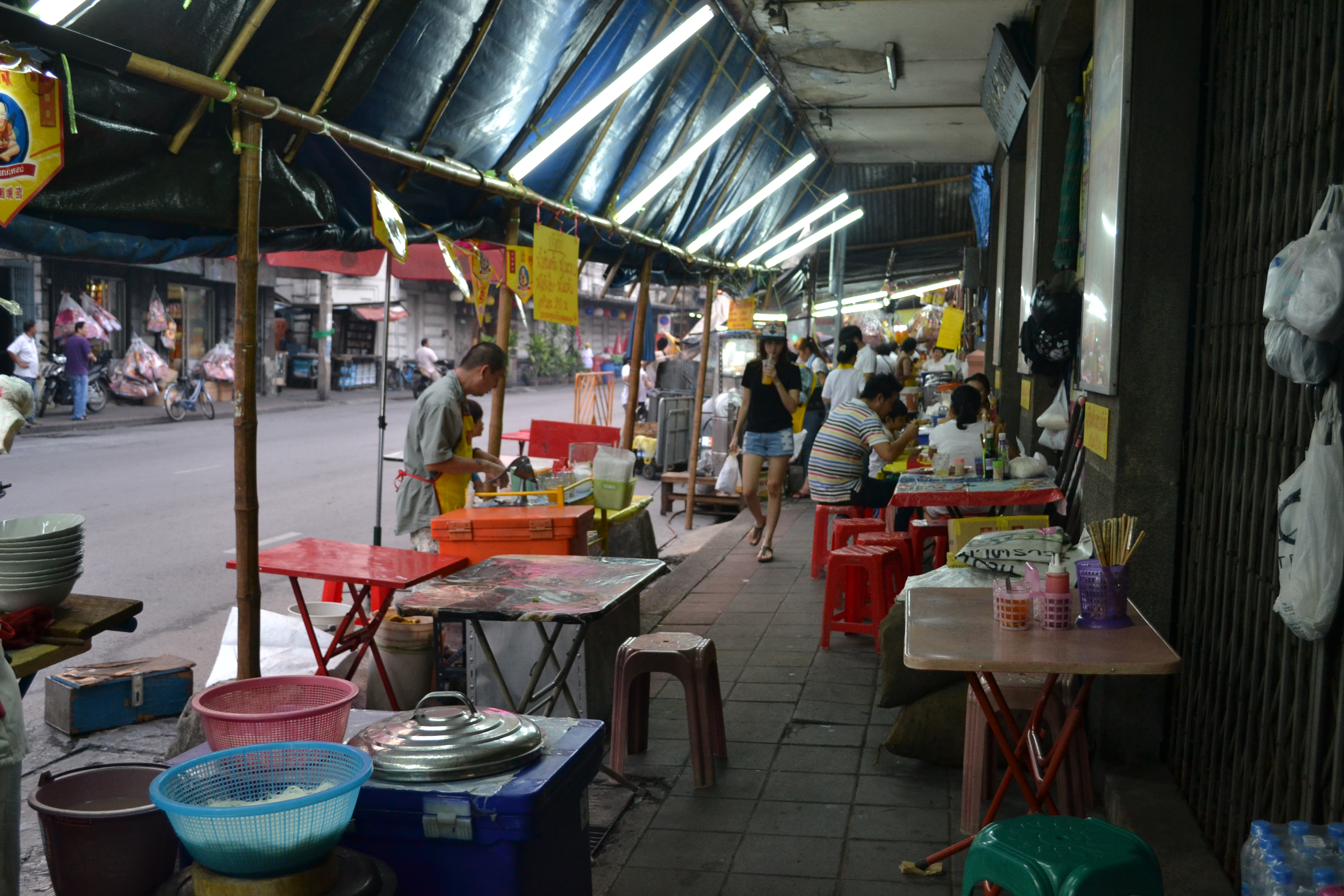
Random street food view in Bangkok, Thailand.

When they were in Bangkok, one of Liu’s model’s home was flooded and so she returned to her hometown to look up her family.

During the filming process, Jia received a call from his sister, telling him that their father has been diagnosed of late-stage lung cancer. He went back to China and stayed in the hospital with his father for weeks until his father died in March 2006.

=== Film Name ===
Liu’s first name Xiaodong in Chinese means ‘Little east’ and director thus chose the name 'Dong' (pronunciation of ‘East’ in Chinese) for the film as this is a documentary of him. It also implies to the geographical location of the setting, which both the Three Gorges Region and Bangkok were located in the East-side of China and Thailand respectively. Moreover, China and Thailand were located in the East side of the world.

== Release ==
Dong was firstly released on the 63rd Venice International Film Festival on 5 September 2006 and was nominated in the ‘Horizons’ Program.

It was then being screened on the 31st Toronto International Film Festival in Canada in 2006 with the ‘Real to Reel’ Program.

== Awards ==
Year	Award	Category	Result
2006	63rd Venice International Film Festival	Horizons Section Best Documentary	Nominated
2006	63rd Venice International Film Festival	Horizons Section Open Prize	Awarded
2006	31st Toronto International Film Festival	Reel-to-Reel Program	Selected

== Reception ==
=== Scholar Comments ===
“Dong exemplifies the cinematic mastery that has earned Jia the distinction of being the planet's most excitingly original filmmaker." (Scott Foundas, LA Weekly)

“Dong and Still Life demonstrates the new and extremely subjective filmmaking style that Jia has pioneered throughout his career.” (Shelly Kracier)

“Produced as a companion piece to Still Life, Dong stands on its own as an aesthetically provocative exploration of the documentary form. Blessed with the director's signature compositional beauty and humanism, Jia's vision of China is concrete and explosive." (Jean-Pierre Rehm, Cahiers du Cinéma)

== See also ==
- Still Life - A companion fictional piece directed by Jia Zhangke
- Three Gorges Dam - The setting of Dong in China
- Liu Xiaodong - A Chinese artist, the main protagonist of Dong
