= Waiting for the Barbarians (Rauch) =

Painting by Neo Rauch

- Artist: Neo Rauch
- Year: 2007
- Medium: Oil on canvas
- Dimensions: 150 cm × 400 cm (59 in × 160 in)
- Location: The Broad, Los Angeles

Waiting for the Barbarians (German: Warten auf die Barbaren) is an oil on canvas painting by the German artist Neo Rauch, from 2007. To the right in the picture is a carnival where a minotaur is cheered on a stage, while to the left another minotaur is about to be burned at the stake. The canvas also includes several other people and creatures. The title is taken from the poem "Waiting for the Barbarians" by Constantine P. Cavafy. The painting is held at The Broad, in Los Angeles.

It was one of fourteen paintings in Rauch's exhibition Para, which was held in the Metropolitan Museum of Art, in New York, in 2007.

== Description ==
To the left, under a clear blue sky, is a barrack, and in front of it a minotaur is strapped to a stake prepared with firewood. In the middle of the picture, a woman lies on her back with a ball in her hand, while a creature with a long red beak touches her breast with a rod. Behind her is another woman who looks out to the left, and behind her a black panther is turned to the right. In the right part of the picture is a carnival with a shooting gallery and a stage where a minotaur is presented to a cheering audience.

== Reception ==
Reviewing the Para exhibition for The New York Times, Roberta Smith wrote that "only two paintings have color that really sings and draws you toward them", of which one was Waiting for the Barbarians and the other was The Next Move. Smith described the painting's "intense blue sky and flailing figures in red, yellow and blue", and compared the reclining woman in the picture to "a version of Eve or the Madonna who has toppled out of Renaissance painting without dropping her main prop." Largely unimpressed by the exhibition as a whole, Smith wrote that "the painting that makes the most sense is Waiting for the Barbarians, in which a Minotaur, or a man dressed as one, is taken to a small stage, like Christ before the people, while another burns at the stake." According to Smith, this distinguished the painting from the rest of the exhibition, which she described as "unassembled and formulaic".

Mario Naves of the New York Observer compared Waiting for the Barbarians to Balthus' 1936 painting The Mountain, and wrote:

The canvases bear an uncanny resemblance to each other, but Mr. Rauch’s enigmatic panorama is too unsettled and stern to succumb to the French master’s brittle nostalgia. However despondent the scenario or antiquated the imagery, a painting by Mr. Rauch points forward—albeit in ways that are hard to pin down. What they have to say about culture or, for that matter, the future is no small cause for concern. In the meantime, Mr. Rauch’s elusive lessons are here to puzzle over.
