= The Tartar Steppe =

1940 book by Dino Buzzati

- First UK edition
- Author: Dino Buzzati
- Original title: Il deserto dei tartari
- Working title: The Stronghold
- Language: Italian
- Genre: Novel
- Publisher: Rizzoli
- Publication date: 1940
- Publication place: Italy

The Tartar Steppe (Italian: Il deserto dei Tartari, lit. 'The desert of the Tartars'), also published as The Stronghold (La fortezza), is a novel by Italian author Dino Buzzati, published in 1940. The novel tells the story of a young officer, Giovanni Drogo, and his life spent guarding Bastiani Fortress, an old, unmaintained border fortress. The novel was ranked 29th on Le Monde's 100 Books of the Century list.

The novel has been translated into English by Stuart C. Hood, in 1952, and by Lawrence Venuti, in 2023.

== Plot ==
The Tartar Steppe tells the story of Giovanni Drogo's lifelong wait for a war in which he can achieve glory. For his first assignment, Lt. Drogo is posted at Bastiani, a remote fortress overlooking the desolate Tartar desert. He understands at once that his life there will be wasted, and he wishes to go back home. Many occasions occur to abandon the place, but he wills himself to pass them up. He spends his career waiting for the barbarian horde rumored to live beyond the desert. Without noticing, Drogo finds in his watch over the fort he has let years and decades pass and that, while his old friends in the city have had children, married, and lived full lives, he has come away with nothing except the solidarity with his fellow soldiers in their long, patient vigil. When the attack finally arrives, Drogo gets ill and the colonel of the fortress dismisses him. Drogo, on his way back home, dies alone in an inn.

== Adaptation ==
In 1976 the novel was adapted into an homonymous film (known in English as The Desert of the Tartars) by Italian director Valerio Zurlini and starring Jacques Perrin as Drogo with Max von Sydow as Ortiz and Vittorio Gassman as Filimore. The film omits certain parts of the novel, especially those relating to the lives of Drogo's friends in his home town.

The 2023 film Luka directed by Jessica Woodworth and starring Jonas Smulders is loosely based on The Tartar Steppe.

== Influences ==
The work was influenced by the 1904 poem "Waiting for the Barbarians" by Constantine P. Cavafy.

== Legacy ==
The novel was a major influence on South African-born writer J. M. Coetzee's 1980 novel Waiting for the Barbarians, the title of which is borrowed from Constantine P. Cavafy's poem of the same name.

The novel is described as the favorite book of the author of The Black Swan, Nassim Nicholas Taleb. Taleb uses the protagonist of The Tartar Steppe to describe our human nature to anchor.

Quebec author Gilles Archambault, in Une démarche de chat: Notes sur une façon de vivre, says that this novel was a major influence on him.

Other writers who have spoken of their indebtedness to the novel include Yann Martel, Alberto Manguel, and Tim Parks, who wrote the introduction to the 2000 Penguin edition.

This book was influential in developing and promoting the literary style known as magic realism.
