= Austin Opera =

Opera company in Austin, Texas, US

Austin Opera, formerly known as the Austin Lyric Opera, is an opera company based in Austin, Texas. The company was founded in 1986. Its key personnel include Annie Burridge as general director, and Timothy Myers as artistic advisor.

In January 2007, it staged the North American premiere of Philip Glass's opera Waiting for the Barbarians.
