= The Barefoot Emperor =

2019 film

- Film poster
- Directed by: Jessica Woodworth; Peter Brosens
- Starring: Peter Van den Begin
- Release date: 6 September 2019 (TIFF)
- Running time: 98 minutes
- Country: Belgium
- Languages: English; Dutch; French; German

The Barefoot Emperor is a 2019 Belgian comedy film directed by Jessica Woodworth and Peter Brosens. It was screened in the Contemporary World Cinema section at the 2019 Toronto International Film Festival. Filmed on the Brijuni Islands, it is a sequel to King of the Belgians, a 2016 mockumentary by the same directors. Events from the first movie are briefly recapped at the beginning of the film. As of October 2021, 50% of the six reviews compiled on Rotten Tomatoes are positive, with an average rating of 5.4/10.

At the 11th Magritte Awards, The Barefoot Emperor received a nomination in the category of Best Flemish Film.

== Cast ==
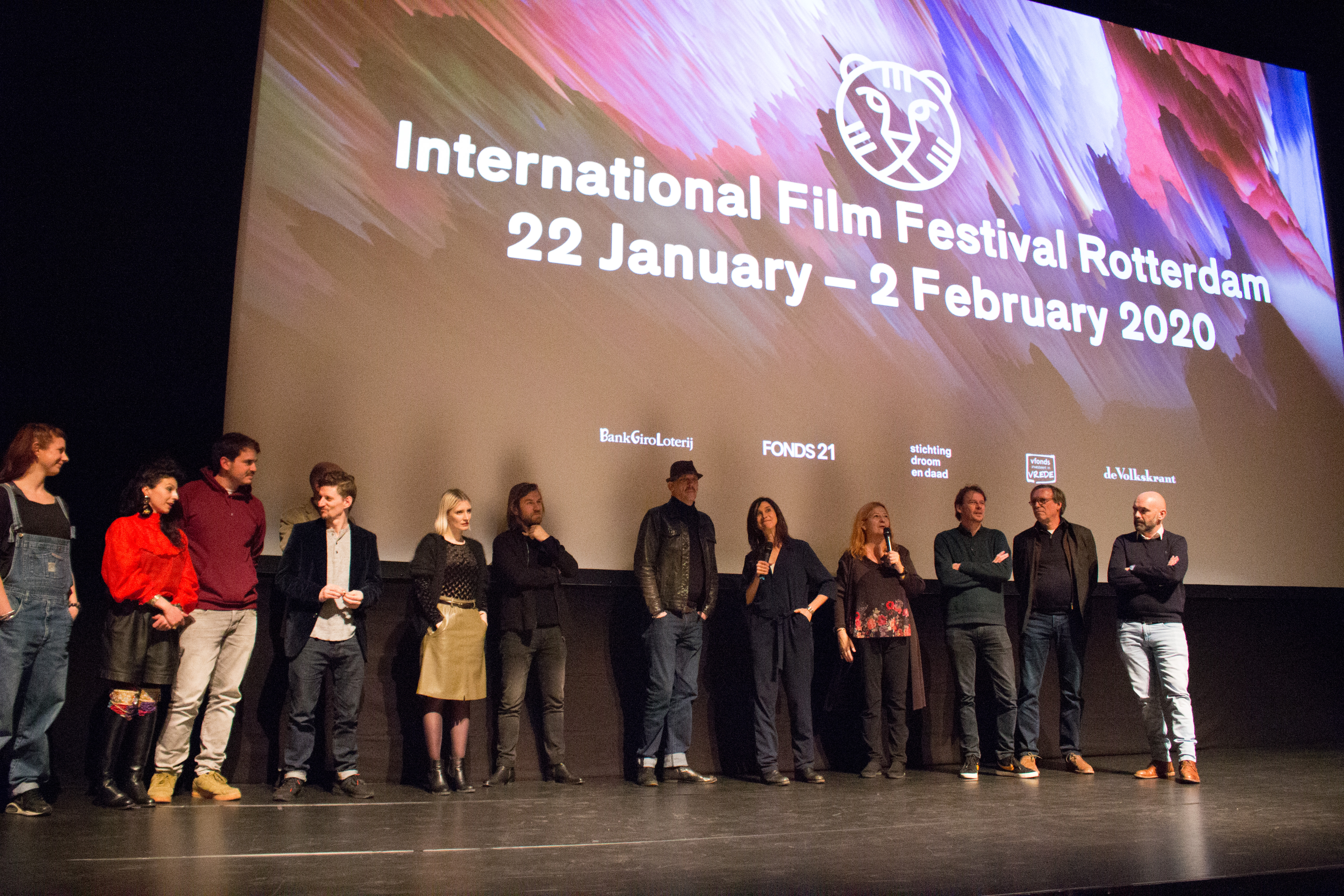
Cast & Crew at the European premiere during the International Film Festival Rotterdam 2020

- Peter Van den Begin as King Nicolas
- Lucie Debay as Louise Vancraeyenest
- Udo Kier as Dr. Otto Kroll
- Geraldine Chaplin as Lady Liz / Dr. Ilse von Stroheim / Mama Wakolux
- Bruno Georis as Ludovic Moreau
- Titus De Voogdt as Carlos De Vos
- Sinisa Labrovic as Dino
- Maya Storm Brosens as Imperial Ring Girl
- Darko Stazic as Mr. Richard Burton
- Pieter Van der Houwen as Duncan Lloyd
