= King of the Belgians (film) =

- Directed by: Peter Brosens; Jessica Woodworth
- Written by: Peter Brosens; Jessica Woodworth
- Produced by: Peter Brosens; Jessica Woodworth
- Starring: Peter Van den Begin
- Cinematography: Ton Peters
- Edited by: David Verdurme
- Release date: September 3, 2016 (Venice Film Festival)
- Countries: Belgium; Netherlands; Bulgaria

King of the Belgians is a 2016 mockumentary comedy film produced, written and directed by Peter Brosens and Jessica Woodworth. It premiered in the Horizons section at the 73rd edition of the Venice Film Festival. It received five nominations at the 8th Magritte Awards, including Best Flemish Film. Its sequel, The Barefoot Emperor, premiered at the 2019 Toronto International Film Festival.

== Plot ==
While Nicolas III, King of the Belgians, is doing an official visit to Istanbul, breaking news arrives: Wallonia just declared its independence and so Belgium doesn't exist anymore. In order to face the political crisis, Nicolas III decides to quickly come back home, but due to a geomagnetic storm all the flights are blocked. Therefore, the King and his staff decide to try to reach Belgium overland, but this becomes very difficult. The hard trip becomes not only a desperate (and comical) travel across the Balkans, but also an inner trip where Nicolas III tries to understand who he really is.

== Cast ==
- Peter Van Den Begin as King Nicolas III
- Lucie Debay as Louise Vancraeyenest
- Titus De Voogdt as Carlos
- Bruno Georis as Ludovic Moreau
- Goran Radaković as Dragan
- Pieter van der Houwen as Duncan Lloyd
- Nina Nikolina as Ana
- Valentin Ganev as Kerim
- Nathalie Laroche as The Queen
- Ekatarina Angelova as Katya
- Kostadin Atanasov as Bagpiper
- Petko Chalakov as Drummer
- Pavel Doytchev as Mayor
- Martin Georgiev as Blind Boy
- Borimir Ilkov as Waiter
- Verka Kirova as Dragan's Mother
- Mihajlo Kotzev as Ratko
- Blagoe Nikolic as Boris
- Mariika Shopova as Ana's Mother
- Atanaska Troyanska as Violeta
