= Andrei Plakhov =

Russian film critic

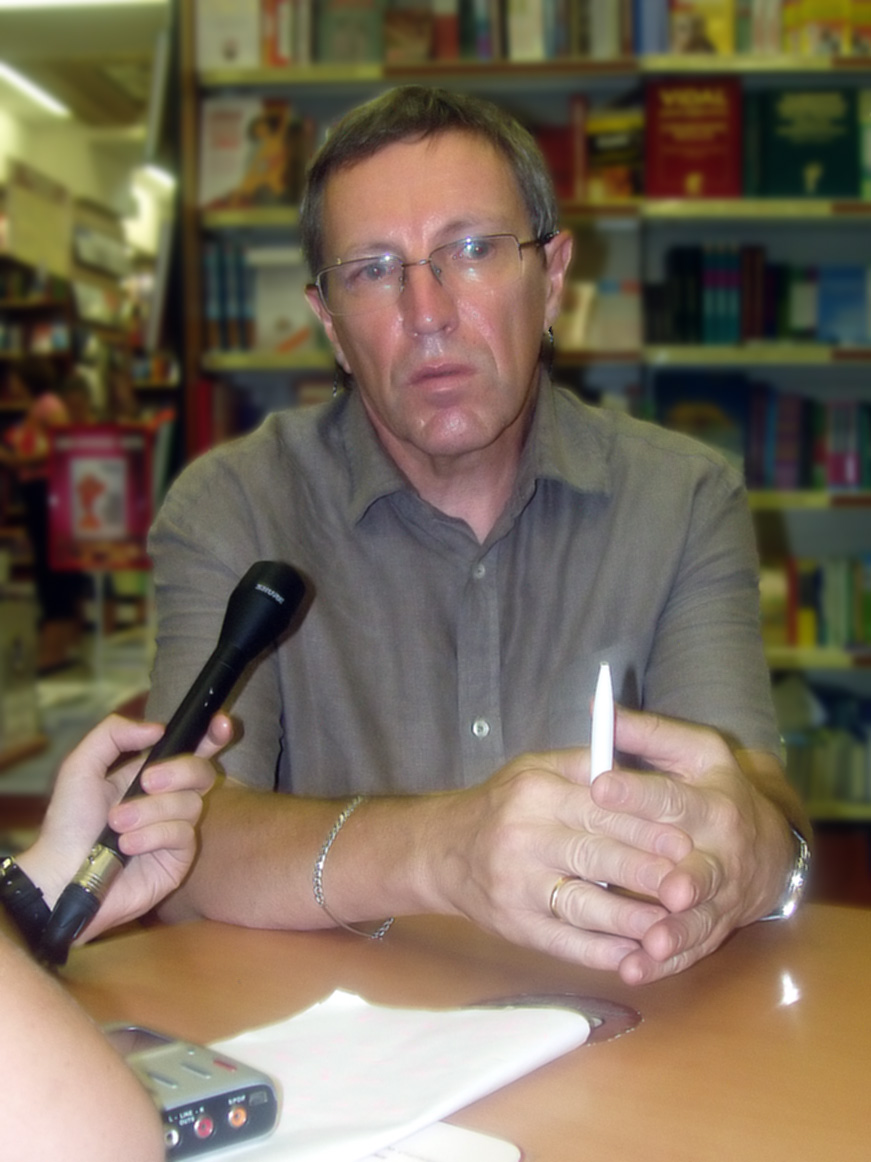
Plakhov in 2008

Andrei Stepanovich Plakhov (Russian: Андрей Степанович Плахов; born 14 September 1950) is a Russian film critic and historian of cinema, columnist for Kommersant newspaper. Honorary President of the International Federation of Film Critics.

== Biography ==
Plakhov was born in Starokostiantyniv, Ukrainian SSR. After graduating in mechanics and mathematics from Lviv University, he studied history of cinema at the Gerasimov Institute of Cinematography. In 1982 he defended a Ph.D. thesis about Luchino Visconti. Since the seventies Plakhov wrote articles and reviews for daily and professional press, both Russian and international (Pravda, Iskusstvo Kino, Seans, Sight and Sound, The Guardian, Cahiers du Cinéma, etc.), he currently works as an author of cinema reviews for Kommersant. During Perestroika Plakhov was a secretary of the USSR Union of Cinematographers and a head of the Conflict Committee, which released more than 200 films banned by Soviet censorship. Plakhov published several books about Soviet and modern world cinema. He is a co-ordinator of the Moscow International Film Festival and a member of the European Film Academy.

== Books by Andrei Plakhov ==
- The Soviet Cinema (1988)
- Altogether 33: Stars of World Cinema (1999)
- Catherine Deneuve: From "Les Parapluies de Cherbourg" to "8 femmes" (2005)
- Under the Sign of F: Film Festivals (2006)
- Aki Kaurismäki: The Last Romantic (2006)
- Directors of Nowadays (in two volumes, 2009)
- Directors of the Future (2010)
- Visconti. History and Myth. Beauty and Death. (2022)

== Other activities ==
In March 2022, Plakhov signed a collective appeal of film critics, film historians and film journalists of Russia against Russian invasion of Ukraine.
