= Waiting for the Barbarians (poem) =

1904 poem written by Constantine P. Cavafy

"Waiting for the Barbarians" (Greek: Περιμένοντας τοὺς Bαρβάρους) is a Greek poem by Constantine P. Cavafy. It was written in November 1898 and printed around December 1904, as a private pamphlet. This poem falls under the umbrella of historical poems Cavafy created in his anthology.

== Story ==
This poem describes a city-state in decline, whose population and legislators are waiting for the arrival of the "barbarians". When night falls, the barbarians have not arrived. The poem ends: "What is to become of us without barbarians? Those people were a solution of a sort." The poem influenced literary works such as The Tartar Steppe by Dino Buzzati (1940), The Opposing Shore (1951) by Julien Gracq, and Waiting for the Barbarians (1980) by J. M. Coetzee.

The questions stated in the poem are all in fifteen-syllable lines, whilst the answers mostly occur in twelve-syllable — sometimes thirteen-syllable — lines. The conclusion is in thirteen-syllable lines. Cavafy himself said that the barbarians are a symbol in this work: "the emperor, the senators and the orators are not necessarily Roman."

=== Excerpt ===
Original Greek	Transliteration	English Translation
Γιατί οι Βάρβαροι θα φθάσουν σήμερα. Κι ο αυτοκράτωρ περιμένει να δεχθεί τον αρχηγό τους. Μάλιστα ετοίμασε για να τον δώσει μια περγαμηνή. Εκεί τον έγραψε τίτλους πολλούς κι ονόματα...	Giatí oi várvaroi tha fthásoun símera. Ki o aftokrátor periménei na dechteí ton archigó tous. Málista etoímase gia na ton dósei mia pergaminí. Ekeí ton ègrapse títlous polloús ki onómata...	Because the Barbarians are coming today and the emperor is waiting to receive them and their general. And he has even made ready a parchment to present them, and there on he has written many names and many titles...

== Techniques ==
=== Irony ===
A big focus for many of Cavafy's political poems consist of irony, or at times dramatic irony.

The first speaker appears to act in a naïve manner, and the second, in comparison, seems sophisticated. In reality, as the conclusions implies, no citizen in the city is acting with solid ground or with enough information. Instead, these citizens are all behaving in accordance to their expectations of what they believe the barbarians will look as well as behave like. At the same time, the poet is showcasing how sometimes politicians can appear clueless or distant from their country's problem and sugar-coat their misfortunes with their opulence. Neither the senate nor the emperor provide any positive action. In their passive roles they are like the people they lead, they are waiting for the intervention of an external force.

=== Imagery ===
The imagery of the poem presents a complex civilization, wealthy and prosperous, that has peaked to the point of its inevitable downfall. Nowhere does the poet explicitly state his opinion. On the contrary, he prefers understatement and irony, allowing adjectives such as "embroidered," "magnificent," and "elegant," used to describe togas and jewelry. This conveys the grandiose, yet static quality of this civilization, which at this point in its development can do no more than display itself.

== History ==
The poem was written in November 1898 and first published in 1904. It has since been translated into several languages and has inspired numerous other works. Daniel Mendelsohn (one of many translators who has produced an English version of "Waiting") has said that the poem's portrayal of a state whose lawmakers sit in stagnant idleness was "particularly prescient" in light of the United States federal government shutdown of 2013.

Robert Pinsky has described it as "cunning" and "amusing". Charles Simić has called it "an apt description of any state that needs enemies, real or imaginary, as a perpetual excuse", while the Independent considered the poem's final line evocative of "the dangers implied by the end of the Cold War".

== Homages ==
J. M. Coetzee's 1980 novel Waiting for the Barbarians is named for the poem, as are Waiting for the Barbarians, the 1998 essay collection by Lewis H. Lapham and Waiting for the Barbarians, the 2013 essay collection by Daniel Mendelsohn. American composer Philip Glass has also written an opera of the same name based on the Coetzee novel which premiered in September 2005 at Theater Erfurt, Germany.

Peter Carey's 1981 novel Bliss sees Lucy's young Communist boyfriend Kenneth quoting the first stanza directly from John Mavrogordato's translation.

Anaal Nathrakh's 2006 album Eschaton has a song named after the poem.

Await Barbarians, the 2014 album by Alexis Taylor, is also named for the poem; similarly, that album's song "Without a Crutch" alludes directly to it.

In 2011, Andrew Ford adapted the poem into a choral work. In 2012, Constantine Koukias adapted it into an opera, "The Barbarians".

Laurie Anderson composed and performed a musical version of the poem at a weeklong festival sponsored by the Onassis Foundation in New York celebrating the 160th anniversary of Cavafy's birth.
