= Parisienne (cigarette) =

Swiss cigarette brand

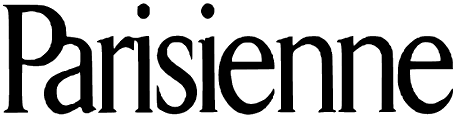

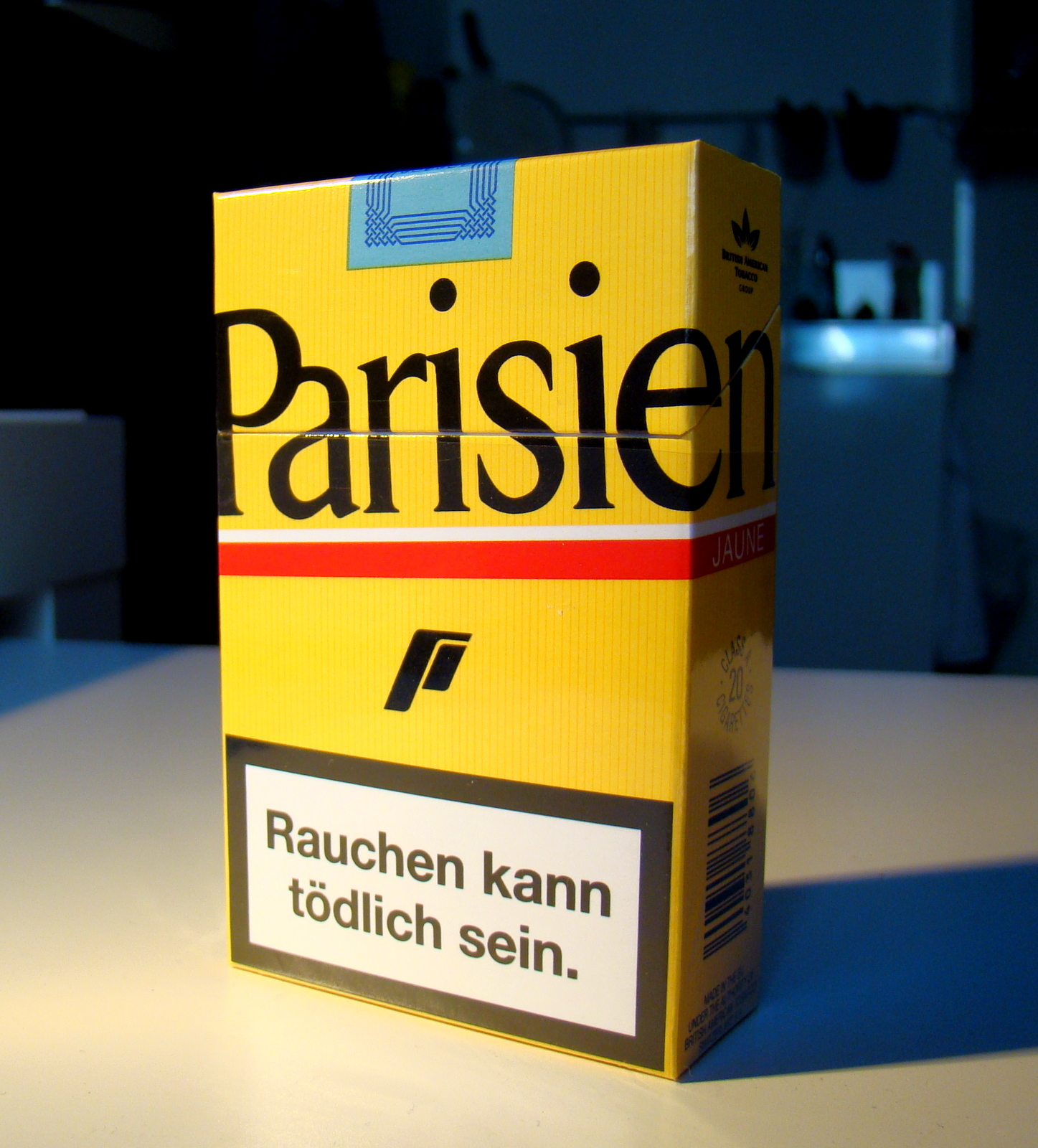
- Product type: Cigarette
- Current owner: British American Tobacco
- Produced by: British American Tobacco
- Country: Switzerland
- Introduced: 1887; 139 years ago
- Markets: Switzerland, Austria, Germany, Argentina where it's known as Parisiennes
- Previous owners: F. J. Burrus

Parisienne (Parisiennes in Argentina)- is a Swiss brand of cigarettes, currently owned by British American Tobacco and manufactured in the city of Boncourt. They approximately produce 6-7 billion sticks per year.

== History ==
Parisienne was launched in 1887 by François-Joseph Burrus and the first filtered cigarettes were produced in 1947. Rothmans bought the brand and factory in 1996, before merging with British American Tobacco in 1999.

Parisienne is one of the most popular cigarette brands in Switzerland. Despite its level of popularity, both domestically and internationally, the brand is sold very rarely outside Switzerland. It had a market share of 13.7% in 2003 and was thus the best-selling cigarette brand in Switzerland after Marlboro.

In the past, the brand was also distributed in Switzerland under the name Parisiennes. Today, Parisiennes Filtres are made by Altadis in Argentina.

Though Parisienne Jaune is the most widely purchased variety, the cigarettes come in the following varieties of increasing strength: Ciel, Orange, Bleue, Verte, Jaune, Noire, Super. The brand is also sold as rolling tobacco.

== Parisienne People ==
The brand was originally called Parisienne People. In the late 1990s, a number of internationally renowned film directors, including Jean-Luc Godard, David Lynch, Emir Kusturica and the Coen Brothers, created advertisements for the brand under the old name. These shorts were shown in cinemas across Switzerland before the film trailers. The directors were given free rein with the adverts and the directorial style of each can clearly be distinguished in their respective shorts.

== Markets ==
Parisienne cigarettes are mainly sold in Switzerland (about half its volumes), but also are or were sold in Austria and Germany. The brand is also sold in Argentina, where it's known as "Parisiennes".

== See also ==
- Tobacco smoking
