= Waiting for the Barbarians (opera) =

2005 opera by Philip Glass

- Opera by Philip Glass
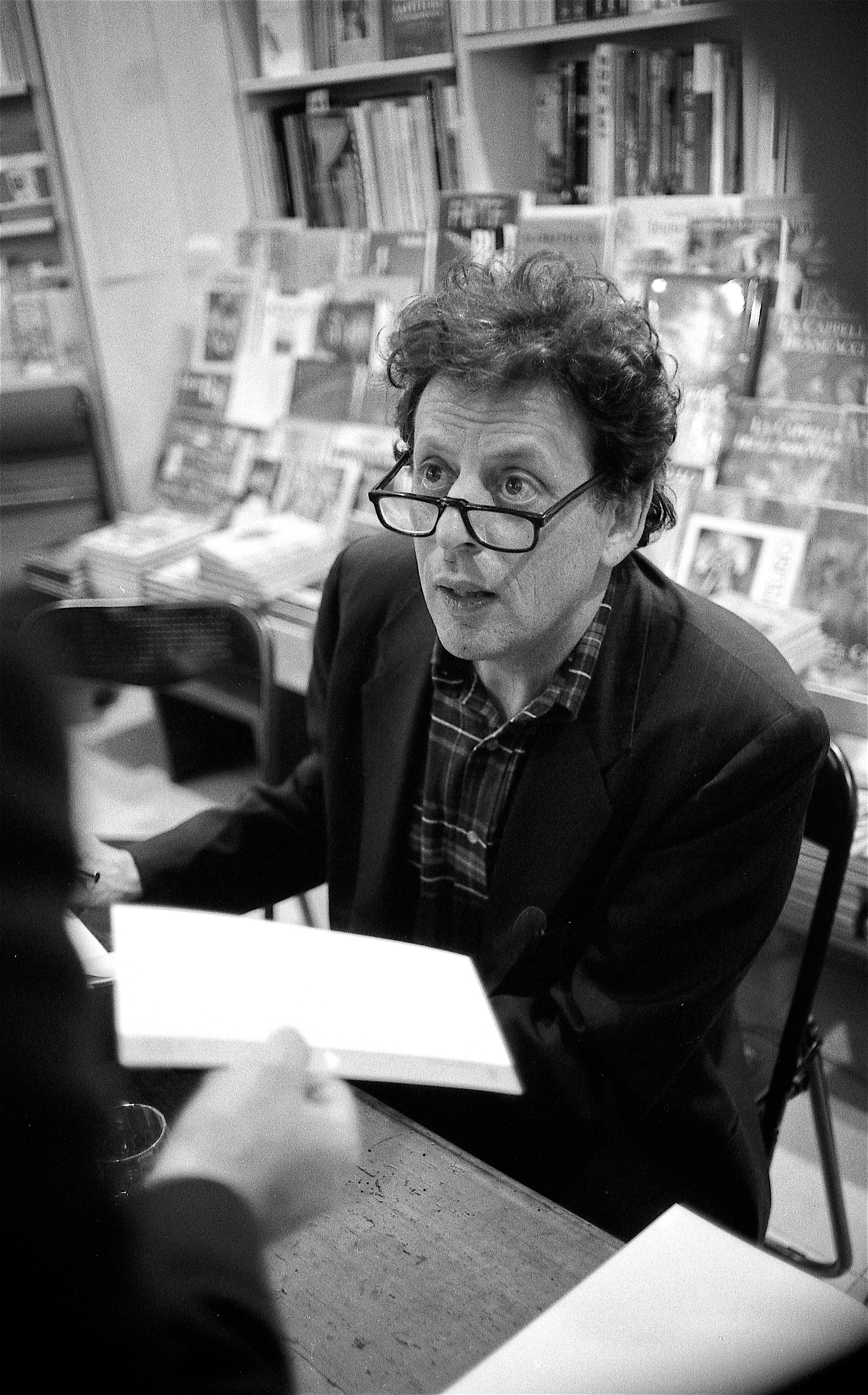
- Glass in 1993
- Librettist: Christopher Hampton
- Language: English
- Based on: Waiting for the Barbarians by J. M. Coetzee
- Premiere: 10 September 2005; Theater Erfurt

Waiting for the Barbarians is an opera in two acts composed by Philip Glass, with libretto by Christopher Hampton based on the 1980 novel of the same name by South African-born author J. M. Coetzee. The opera was commissioned by the Theater Erfurt in Erfurt, Germany.

== Performance history ==
Waiting for the Barbarians premiered on September 10, 2005 at Erfurt Theater, directed by Guy Montavon and conducted by Dennis Russell Davies. There was one other European performance in Amsterdam in 2006. Its American premiere was performed on January 19, 2007 by the Austin Lyric Opera in Austin, Texas. The opera was also performed on June 12, 2008 at the Barbican Centre in London.

== Synopsis ==
On the border of an unnamed Empire, the Magistrate of a relatively peaceful and unimportant town spends the days working for the well-being of his community and the nights in the company of his lady-friends.

Abruptly, the peace of this seeming idyll is broken by the arrival of a detachment of the government's Civil Guard, headed by the cold, obsessive Colonel Joll, apparently in response to rumors that the barbarians are massing to attack the Empire. As Joll says, "We are forced to begin a short war in order to safeguard the peace."

Joll and his men set out to attack a group of the barbarians, and bring back to town a number of prisoners, whom they interrogate, torture, and, in the case of one old man, kill. The Magistrate protests, at first weakly; Joll then returns to the capital city of the Empire to report and to plan further attacks on the barbarians.

The Magistrate discovers a barbarian girl, crippled and partially blinded, begging in the town. He feels a mixture of pity and, increasingly, attraction to her, and arranges for her to stay and work in the establishment where his female friend the cook works. He spends time with the girl, questioning her about the interrogation and torture by Joll's men which has left her disabled.

Confused by his growing feelings of sexual attraction, pity, and anger, the Magistrate takes the girl on a journey through the wilderness in order to return her to her people, the Barbarians. Upon his return to the town, he finds that Joll has been spreading doubts about the Magistrate's loyalty to the Empire; the populace accuse him of being a traitor and "barbarian-lover", despite his protestations that, far from being a military threat, the barbarians are peaceful nomads who have no interest in occupying the Empire.

The Magistrate himself is now imprisoned in solitary confinement for some months and tortured. Eventually he is released; the Empire's military forces have been routed by the guerilla tactics of the barbarians, and they are being "temporarily" withdrawn to the capital of the Empire, ostensibly to wait for next year's Spring offensive.

The town's supplies have been pillaged by the troops, and the Magistrate exhorts the people to be brave and to work to survive the winter by planting root vegetables, catching and drying fish, and conserving the little food that has been left to them. He goes to visit his old friend the Cook, who rebukes him for having used the Barbarian girl and for not having been able to understand her at all. He is left alone, wondering even more about who the true barbarians are.

== Structure ==
- ACT I
  - Prelude
  - Scene 1: "In Fact, We Never Had a Prison"
  - Scene 2: Dreamscape No. 1
  - Scene 3: "You Sent for Me"
  - Scene 4: "You're Working Late"
  - Scene 5: "Normally Speaking, We Would Never Approve of Torture..."
  - Scene 6: "Take off Your Cap"
  - Scene 7: Dreamscape No. 2
  - Scene 8: "Do You Like Living in the Town?"
  - Scene 9: "...To Demonstrate Our Strength to the Barbarians"
  - Scene 10: "Did you have a good evening?"
  - Scene 11: Dreamscape No. 3
  - Scene 12: "What is it?"
  - Scene 13: "Can you see them?" (Trip into the Mountains)
  - Scene 14: "Who Gave You Permission to Desert Your Post?"
- ACT II
  - Scene 1: "Here, In the Dark"
  - Scene 2: Dreamscape No. 4
  - Scene 3: "What is Going On?"
  - Prologue to Scene 4
  - Scene 4: "Perhaps You Would Be So Kind"
  - Scene 5: "Enemy, Barbarian Lover!"
  - Scene 6: "So We're Still Feeding You Well?"
  - Scene 7: Dreamscape No. 5
  - Scene 8: "Tell Me, What Has Happened"
  - Scene 9: "You Don't Have to Go"
  - Scene 10: "Our Town is Beautiful"

== Recording ==
On June 3, 2008 a recording of Waiting for the Barbarians was released on the Orange Mountain Music label.
