= Alonso Mayo =

Peruvian film director and screenwriter (born 1978)

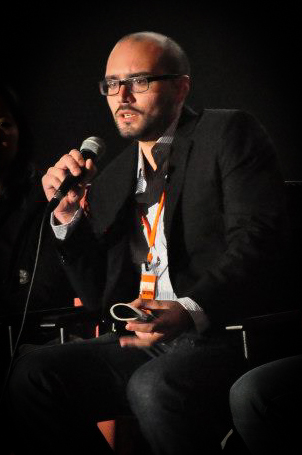
- Mayo at 2013 Irvine International Film Festival
- Born: December 30, 1978 (age 47); Lima, Peru
- Education: Lawrence High School
- Alma mater: University of Lima; AFI Conservatory
- Occupations: Film director, screenwriter
- Writing career
- Notable work: The Story of Luke

Alonso Mayo (born December 30, 1978) is a Peruvian film director and screenwriter best known for his independent film The Story of Luke (2012). He has won a Student Academy Award (for Wednesday Afternoon).

== Early life ==
Mayo was born in Lima, Peru, and grew up traveling back and forth between Peru and Lawrence, Kansas, while his mother, special education teacher Liliana Mayo, did her post-graduate studies at the University of Kansas. Mayo graduated from Lawrence High School.

Mayo received a B.A. from University of Lima, where he majored in film and journalism. He received a M.F.A. in film directing from the American Film Institute Conservatory. His thesis film Wednesday Afternoon, starring Jose Yenque and Jeffrey Licon, was official selection of the Deauville American Film Festival, Camerimage Film Festival and won a Directors Guild of America Student Award as well as the Gold Medal in the Narrative category of the 2005 Student Academy Awards.

== Career ==
Mayo co-directed the Southern Poverty Law Center's Teaching Tolerance documentary Viva La Causa, about the life of Cesar Chavez, which was shortlisted for the 2008 Academy Awards. In 2010, Mayo directed the dramatic web series Untitled Fiction Project about the aftermath of an affair. The 13 episode series was shot using structured improvisation. The storyline was later continued in 2013's Untitled Murder Project 2.0, a 36 episode experiment in nonlinear storytelling.

Mayo directed his first feature film in 2011, the comedy-drama The Story of Luke about a young man with autism on a quest for a job and a girlfriend, starring Lou Taylor Pucci, Seth Green, Cary Elwes and Kristin Bauer. The film was inspired by Mayo's experiences with young men and women on the autism spectrum at Centro Ann Sullivan del Perú as seen in his research documentary Just Like Anyone. The Story of Luke premiered at the 2012 San Diego Film Festival, where it won Best Film. It went on to win over 20 film festival awards and was released theatrically and on demand in 2013 by Gravitas Ventures.

Mayo teaches film directing and screenwriting at New York Film Academy Los Angeles campus.

== Filmography ==
Short film

Year	Title	Director	Writer
2004	Wednesday Afternoon	Yes	Yes

Documentary

- Viva La Causa (2008)
- Just Like Anyone (2008)

Web series

Year	Title	Director	Writer
2010	Untitled Fiction Project	Yes	No
2013	Untitled Murder Project 2.0	Yes	Yes

Feature film

Year	Title	Director	Writer
2012	The Story of Luke	Yes	Yes
