= Esteban Campodónico Prize =

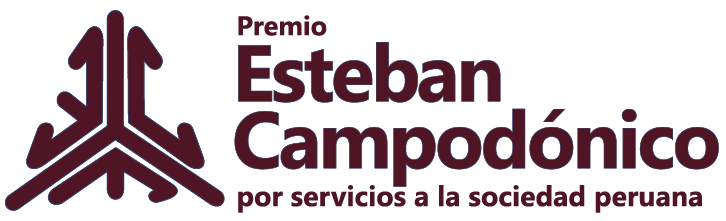
- Awarded for: Service to Peruvian Society
- Description: Awarded annually to a person or organization that has benefited Peruvian society by their work, in two areas: outstanding professional accomplishment, and direct services to society.
- Sponsored by: Campodonico Foundation
- Country: Peru
- Presented by: University of Piura
- Rewards: Medal, diploma, and money currently USD 50,000
- First award: 1995
- Website: https://www.udep.edu.pe/campodonico/

The Esteban Campodónico Prize is a prize awarded annually since 1995 to individuals or institutions that have benefited Peruvian society by their work. The prize is funded by a legacy left by Esteban Campodónico, an Italian-Peruvian medical doctor, university professor, and philanthropist. The prize is managed jointly by Clover Foundation in New York and the University of Piura in Piura, Peru.

The aim of the prize is to recognize and encourage outstanding individuals and institutions for their commitment and significant contributions to the development of Peruvian society, especially its most vulnerable populations.

== Establishment of the Prize ==
Dr. Esteban Campodónico was born in Italy in 1866. At age 13 he immigrated with his family to Peru, where he studied medicine and became a physician and professor of medicine at the National University of San Marcos in Lima.

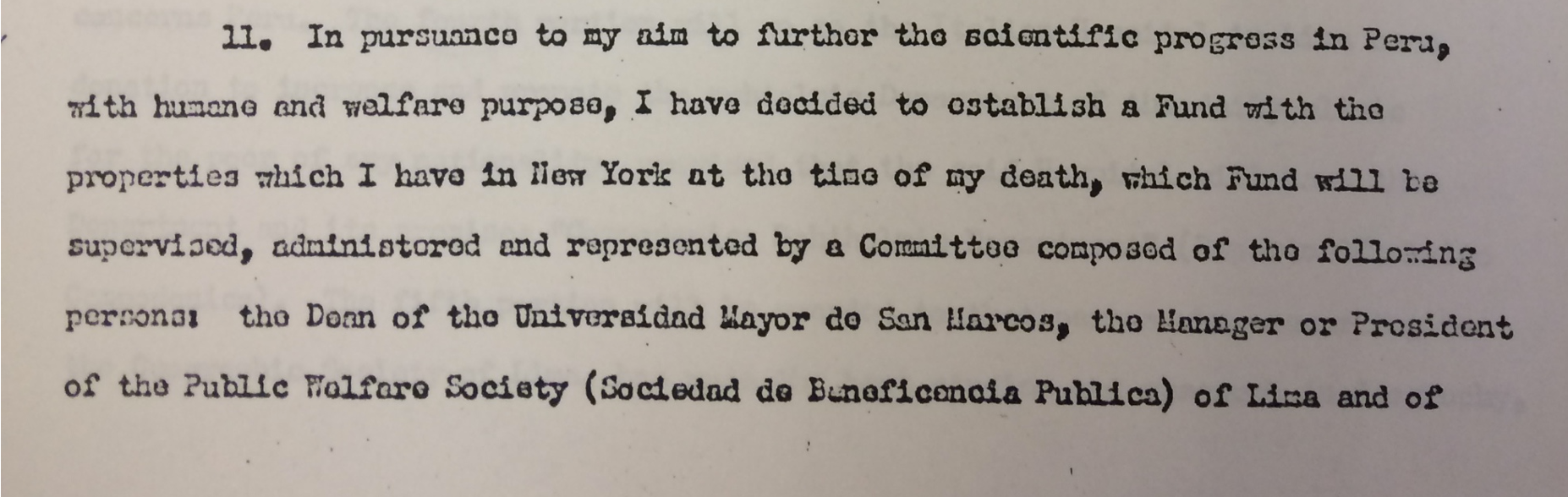
Excerpt from Last Will and Testament of Esteban Campodónico establishing the Esteban Campodónico Prize.

He was unmarried until the last year of his life and had no children. He had several sisters who married and had children. In his will, drawn up in August 1937, he specified that his Peruvian assets would be left to his relatives, but in addition, he established a fund whose income would be used for prizes "to further the scientific progress in Peru, with humane and welfare purpose."

However, in September, 1937 he traveled to the United States, and on June 30, 1938 he married Ethel C. Graff, a California socialite who lived in Oakland, California. It is not known exactly how they met; most likely they met while both were traveling, and kept in touch by letter thereafter. It could have been something similar to what we know happened earlier: on a trip to Europe with her parents in 1914, Ethel met a German physician and two years later announced her engagement to him, although ultimately that wedding did not take place. Dr. Campodonico amended his will so that the earnings of the trust fund would support his widow after his death. The couple took a steamer to Peru; during the trip he contracted pneumonia and died on October 23, 1938. Ethel was 52 years old at the time of his death, and lived to be 97.

Following his widow's death in 1984, Citibank, which held the trust fund, encountered difficulties in implementing the prize according to the terms of the will. There was to be a foundation to manage the prize, with a committee of directors composed of the Dean of the National University of San Marcos, the Manager of the Public Welfare Society of Lima, the Italian ambassador in Lima or his representative, the manager of the Italian Bank in Lima, and the manager of the Lima branch of the City Bank of New York. At the time the will was composed these were all friends, relatives, or colleagues of his. But by now, those individuals had died, and their successors were unable or unwilling to serve on the committee. Furthermore, there were legal problems involving the international character of the proposed foundation, with the funds in a U.S. account but to be administered by a foundation based in Peru. The scope of the prize, outlined below, was also rather ambitious for the amount of funds available. Citibank worked with Dr. Campodonico's relatives in Peru to find a solution, but without success. Time was running out, since according to law, if a solution were not found within 10 years, the funds would revert to the state.

Finally, by chance, in 1991, a lawyer working on the matter for Citibank talked about these difficulties over lunch with his friend Ralph Coti, a lawyer who happened to be on the board of directors of Clover Foundation. Clover is a private foundation based in the U.S., which was established in 1985 by a wealthy Mexican couple, Francisco and Begoña Gómez, to support charitable, educational, and cultural initiatives in Mexico and other countries. Clover Foundation already had a relationship with the University of Piura. Dr. Coti realized that Clover could be the entity in the United States that would ensure that the use and reporting of fund disbursements comply with the Internal Revenue Service regulations with respect to foreign grants, while the University of Piura could act as its agent in operating the prize in Peru. This solution was presented to Citibank, which accepted the plan. A judgment was obtained from the Supreme Court of New York State altering the terms of the will in a way that "would carry out the general intent of the Settlor for distributing awards for Peruvian scientific, literary, humanitarian and artistic achievements out of the trust income and in the name of the Settlor," while being practical to implement. The Campodonico Foundation was established in 1994 to administer the prize.

== Original Plan for the Prize ==
In his will, Dr. Campodonico envisioned that each year the earnings from the fund would be divided and distributed on a four-year cycle as follows. (In this outline, the wording follows as closely as possible the official English translation of the will, only making modifications for brevity and clarity, and to correct minor errors.)

First year: four equal portions, to be awarded to

- the person who has published the best scientific treatise on medical and hygienic sciences, particularly applicable in Peru.
- the person responsible for the best publication on Natural Sciences in any of its branches, such as Botany, Zoology, Geology and Paleontology, and this particularly for what concerns Peru.
- the Italian Hospital in Lima as a donation to increase and promote the ophthalmic department of the daily clinic for the poor of any nationality, provided that the said Hospital will name this department and its premises "Campodonico Ophthalmic Department". (Ophthalmology was one of Dr. Campodonico's specialties, and he offered free treatment to the indigent in this clinic for many years.)
- that person who, according to the Geographic Society of Lima, has made the best studies and research in Geography, Ethnology, Archeology, historic and prehistoric, concerning Peru.

Second year: four equal portions, to be applied to

- the philology of the Incas and languages allied with Quechua, Aymara, etc.
- the best work of art of Incan or colonial theme.
- the person who shall have made outstanding studies of Greek and Latin classics in Peru.
- assist his nephews and nieces who, in the estimate of the Committee, are more in need, and if these have died or if none of his nephews and nieces are in need, this portion is to be given to that person who, according to the Faculty in Medicine, has made the best studies on the Peruvian wart. (Dr. Campodonico had a special interest in this disease, also known as Carrion's disease.)

Third year: five equal portions

- applicable to the most important publication in Sociology for what pertains to Peru.
- for the best literary publication relating to Peru.
- to the person who has achieved the greatest deed in Peruvian territory. (The original Spanish adds "or having Peruvian territory as their point of departure or arrival", suggesting Dr. Campodonico wanted to include feats of exploration.)
- to that Italian subject who, according to the judgment of the Italian Minister, after hearing the report of the Committee of the Italian Colony, has brought outstanding honor to Italy and Peru in Science, Arts and other extraordinary fields.
- to that person who, in the judgment of the Faculty in Medicine, has made the best study on Peruvian endemic diseases.

Fourth year: two unequal parts

- four-fifths applied to the promotion and support of a periodical publication of literary-scientific character published in his memory as often as permitted by the material and funds, and named "Minerva Peruana".
- one-fifth applied to the conservation and restoration, if necessary, and the weekly cleaning of the monument erected in the Cemetery of Lima in memory of his mother.

In the fifth year, the cycle returns to the beginning.

The will also specifies that the prize for each of these accomplishments will be named "Esteban Campodonico Prize".

== Current Plan of the Prize ==
The court judgment greatly simplified the plan for the prize. The court deemed it advisable for the fund to be exempt from federal and state taxes. In order to meet this requirement, it was necessary that the fund have only charitable interests. Therefore the judgment removed the items that benefited Dr. Campodonico's relatives personally: the aid to any needy nephews and nieces, and the maintenance of his mother's tomb (where he himself was also buried). The relatives in Peru attested that none of them were needy, and that they could take care of the maintenance of the tomb. The court also ordered that Citibank pay the net income received from the fund in annual or more frequent installments to Clover, and that "The Clover Foundation make awards in the memory and name of the Settlor exclusively for achievements for scientific, literary, artistic and humanitarian fields in Peru in order to accomplish the general charitable purposes of the Settlor without being obliged to follow the specific restrictions and limitations as set forth in the Peruvian Will of the Settlor".

The fund endowed by Dr. Campodonico was established as "Campodonico Foundation", a nonexempt charitable trust under Section 4947(a)(1) the U.S. Internal Revenue Code. Although such a trust is not exempt from income taxes, if it uses all of its income for charitable purposes, it will have no taxable income. In accordance with the regulations of this code, the installments paid annually to The Clover Foundation are not actually equal to the annual earnings from the fund. Rather, the payments are equal to five percent of the market value of the fund. A part of this amount is used for the prize money, and the balance is spent on operating expenses.

Clover engaged the services of the University of Piura to administer the prize in Peru. The university was founded in 1969 in Piura, a coastal city in the north of Peru, at the inspiration of Josemaría Escrivá, founder of Opus Dei. The university solicits nominations, impanels a jury to select the prize winner, and holds the prize ceremony. Usually the prize ceremony is held in Lima, where the university has a branch campus. The prize was first awarded in 1995.

From 1995 to 2012, two or three prizes were awarded annually, in the areas of outstanding professional accomplishment of an individual and direct services to society of an individual or organization. Beginning in 2013, one prize is awarded each year, alternating between the areas of outstanding professional accomplishment (odd years) and direct services to society (even years).

== Prizewinners ==
As of 2025, 53 persons or organizations were awarded the prize. Below is a list of the winners in each of the two areas. In this list, a cross † after the name indicates that the person has died. Short biographies or histories of the prize winners through 2023 have been collected in a book which is available online.

=== Prizes in area of outstanding professional accomplishment ===
These prizes are awarded to individuals whose professional work is particularly notable and directly in service to society, not simply successful professionals.

Year	Winner	Brief biography
1995	José Raúl Davelouis McEvoy †	Agricultural engineer who studied the restoration of degraded soils and promoted the use of phosphate rock (of organic origin) found in Bayóvar, on the northern coast of Peru, as fertilizer.
1996	Liliana Mayo	Psychologist and special education teacher, founder and general director of Centro Ann Sullivan del Perú (named for the teacher of Helen Keller), which assists people with developmental disabilities such as autism or Down syndrome.
1997	Alberto Giesecke Matto †	Electrical engineer and seismologist, he specialized in geophysics and the mitigation of natural disasters.
1998	Dr. Segundo Seclén	Endocrinologist and professor at Cayetano Heredia University, recognized for his contribution to the understanding and treatment of type 1 diabetes mellitus. He discovered a genetic factor that explains the low incidence of this disease in the Andean and mixed-race population.
1999	Luis Zapata Baglietto †	Civil engineer who worked to develop principles of structural engineering, particularly aiming at the prevention and mitigation of damage from natural catastrophes such as earthquakes.
2000	Roger Rodríguez Iturri †	Lawyer, magistrate, and professor of law at the Pontifical Catholic University of Peru. His work was dedicated to family law and the reform of judicial power.
2001	Cecilia Pacheco Calle †	Advocate for the disabled, founded the Amigos (Friends) group in 1993, aimed at improving the living standards of people with disabilities and providing vocational rehabilitation. She delivered counseling and training talks to marginalized areas of Piura, her hometown in the north of Peru, for groups with disabilities.
2002	Dr. Gustavo Gonzales Rengifo	Physician, biologist, and researcher specializing in high altitude biology and medicine. Formerly professor at Cayetano Heredia University, as of November 2024 he became Dean of the Faculty of Health Sciences at Universidad San Ignacio de Loyola in Lima. Member of the Peruvian National Academy of Medicine.
2003	Rev. Gastón Garatea, SS.CC.	Theologian and priest of the Congregation of the Sacred Hearts of Jesus and Mary, he was Vicar General of the Prelature of Ayaviri and served on the Truth and Reconciliation Commission (Peru) to investigate the human rights abuses which occurred during the period of unrest in Peru in the 1980s and 1990s.
2004	Antonio Brack Egg †	Biologist and university professor specializing in the environment and natural resource management. He served as a consultant for the United Nations Development Program (UNDP) and directed the program "La Buena Tierra" ["The Good Earth"], which aired on state television. He also contributed to the establishment of protected natural areas in Peru.
2005	Dr. Eduardo Gotuzzo Herencia	Physician and university professor specializing in public health, especially in relation to infectious diseases. At the time of this award he was director of the Alexander von Humboldt Institute of Tropical Medicine at the Cayetano Heredia University in Lima.
2006	Jaime Delgado Zegarra	Lawyer and politician, who has worked to promote the defense of consumers' rights. He founded the Peruvian Association of Consumers and Users, ASPEC. Subsequently, from 2011–2016 he served as representative for metropolitan Lima in the National Congress of Peru.
2007	Dr. Ruth Shady	Anthropologist and archaeologist who discovered and documented the Caral–Supe civilization in northern Peru, also called Norte Chico, the earliest known civilization in the Americas.
2008	Dr. Augusto Bazán Altuna †	Physician who worked for more than 60 years at the Peruvian National Institute of Children's Health. His major contributions were in the field of child burn care and prevention.
2009	Dr. Ciro Maguiña	Physician and researcher specializing in infectious diseases, including re-emerging diseases such as the Peruvian wart.
2010	Gerásimo Sosa Alache	Quechua artisan ceramist who creates handmade objects in traditional Peruvian styles.
2011	Julio Kuroiwa †	Engineer and seismologist known as the "father of Peruvian seismic engineering." He dedicated his work to mitigating risks from earthquakes and other natural disasters.
2012	Alberto Cazorla Tálleri †	Biochemist who played a key role in the founding and development of Cayetano Heredia University, and served as its rector.
2013	Adriana Rebaza Flores †	Pioneer in disability care, founded the Dr. Adriana Rebaza Flores National Institute of Rehabilitation of Peru, which has been named in her honor.
2015	Walter Alva	Archaeologist who led excavations of the royal tombs of the Moche culture at Huaca Rajada (also called Sipán).
2017	Martha Mifflin Dañino	Founder of Radio Filarmonía, a cultural and musical radio station in Peru broadcasting since 1984.
2019	Marino Morikawa	Environmental scientist who works on restoration of wetlands using advanced nanotechnology.
2021	Humberto Guerra Allison	Physician and scientist specializing in infectious diseases, who co-founded a Tropical Medicine Institute at Cayetano Heredia University.
2023	Walter Velásquez Godoy	Schoolteacher in the Colcabamba District of Peru, who created a teaching robot that speaks Spanish and Quechua, to provide continuity of education during the COVID-19 pandemic.
2025	Giannina Honorio	Industrial engineer and neuroscientist who has founded several technology-based companies that provide free online instruction in sign language and devices to assist people with hearing impairments; promote inclusiveness in the workplace; and provide environmental monitoring with alerts for key environmental risks.

=== Prizes in area of direct services to society ===
These prizes are awarded to individuals or organizations whose work directly benefits the needy or society in general.

Year	Winner	Brief description
1995	AFESA	Family, Educational, and Health Assistance Association, nonprofit civil association founded in 1985 in Abancay, in the southern Peruvian Andes, in one of the poorest regions of the country. It provides social services such as homes for orphan children, a nursing home for seniors, a medical center, free soup kitchens, and a training center for rural women.
1995	Condoray	School for women founded in 1963 in the rural region of San Vicente de Cañete, south of Lima, it offers training in technology and micro-enterprise.
1996	"Joy in the Lord" School	School founded in 1954 by Rosemarie Stemmler, that offers special education for children with disabilities that do not hinder their cognitive development, such as motor disabilities.
1997	CIRPLAST	NGO formed by volunteer plastic surgeons providing free surgery to correct cleft lip and palate deformities in remote areas of Peru.
1998	Rev. Jean Marie Protain, CSSR †	Redemptorist priest born in France, he came to Peru in 1938 and established a seminary in Huanta, a town in the region of Ayacucho. In the 1950s he was assigned to Lima, where he founded a parish and organized care services in one of the poorest neighborhoods. Later he founded a congregation of the Missionary Sisters of Our Lady of Perpetual Help in Lima.
1999	Brother Paul McAuley †	De La Salle brother from England, he came to Peru in 1991. He founded the Fe y Alegría [Faith and Joy] School in Zapallal, a slum on the outskirts of Lima, offering programs of vocational training and micro-enterprise. In 2000 he moved to Iquitos, in the Peruvian Amazon, to assist the native communities, and founded the Loretana Environmental Network, dedicated to the protection of the environment. In 2019, his burned body was found, apparently a victim of anti-environmentalist violence.
2000	Rev. José Chuquillanqui	Diocesan priest of a parish in Manchay, a low-income district of Lima, he organized soup kitchens as well as schools and various public services for the most needy in the area.
2001	Sister María Estrella del Carmen Valcárcel †	Nun known as Mother Covadonga, she came from her native Spain to Peru to work with groups in Ayacucho, founding a literacy school and a library, as well as a Municipal Ombudsman's Office for Children and Adolescents.
2002	Mino Castro Cesar	Native of the indigenous Asháninka community in the province of Chanchamayo Province in the Junín Region of Peru, on the eastern slopes of the Andes. He has worked to preserve the Asháninka dialect and culture, which he has also promoted as an ambassador for his native community, serving as a national and international delegate for Indigenous and legal affairs.
2002	Solidarity on the Move Association	Non-profit civil association founded in 1988 that brought together young Catholic volunteers and professionals to carry out charitable work and human development projects aimed at individuals, families, and the community in impoverished areas of Lima.
2003	ANAR Foundation	NGO founded in Spain in 1970. In 1998 it opened a branch in Peru which operates a helpline for young people in distress and the ANAR Home for abandoned children. Its goal is "a world in which all children and adolescents have the right to have their voice heard in life situations that affect them, and whenever their rights are violated".
2003	Radio Onda Azul [Blue Wave],	Radio station founded in 1958 by the Catholic Diocese of Puno, Peru, it offers educational and evangelizing programming and distance learning, including programs in Quechua and Aymara, in the Altiplano region of southern Peru, which includes some of the poorest regions of the country.
2004	Lucía Claux de Tola	Helped to found the Peruvian organization Fundades, which assists children with disabilities.
2005	ADAINEN	Women's Auxiliary of the National Institute of Neoplastic Diseases — Association of volunteers founded in 1978 to raise funds, gather medicines and medical teams, and provide moral, social, and economic aid to needy cancer patients.
2005	Victor Larco Herrera Civil Association for Mental Health	Organization founded in 1995 and based at the Victor Larco Herrera mental health hospital, whose volunteers provide personal hygiene services, workshops, outings, occupational therapy, and other activities that greatly benefit the patients.
2006	ProRural Civil Association	Non-profit institution to promote rural development through education and building the abilities of rural residents in school, family, life and work skills, small-scale agriculture, productivity, democracy and citizenship, natural resource management, and sustainable development.
2007	Association of Volunteers of the National Institute of Children's Health	Organization founded in 1989, whose volunteers provide affection and care, especially to the most needy, abandoned, and disabled children. They also work to improve the care of the children and their mothers with medicines and equipment, and in fundraising.
2008	Jean Louis Lebel	Canadian-Peruvian physical education teacher who in 1987 founded CIMA, the Center for the Integration of Abandoned Minors, located in Lima, which works with children living on the streets, to persuade them to modify their behavior in a place where they would not suffer abuse, but rather be protected and receive guidance. It offers workshops in handicrafts and other skills.
2009	"I learn with you" Association	Organization that provides education and recreation for hospitalized children, so that the development of their physical, intellectual, and emotional capacities is not interrupted.
2010	SOS Children's Villages	Peruvian branch of worldwide nongovernmental organization (NGO) providing support for distressed families and for children without parental care or in danger of losing it.
2011	Special Education School "Fernando Wiese Eslava"	School for deaf children founded in 1959 in Lima.
2012	Angels D1 Cultural Association	Organization founded in 2005 by the dancer Vania Masías to empower and develop the potential of young people in the most disadvantaged areas of Lima through the arts.
2014	Symphony for Peru	Organization founded in 2011 by the tenor Juan Diego Flórez that uses musical performance to raise the social and cultural level of underprivileged youth.
2016	Bishop Adriano Tomasi, OFM	Italian-Peruvian Franciscan priest who worked for many years with the Chinese immigrant community of Lima and became an auxiliary bishop of Lima.
2018	ANIQUEM – Association for Aid to Burned Children	Organization founded in 1999 by Dr. Víctor Raúl Rodríguez and Dr. Mary Consuelo Malca to provide medical care and rehabilitation for badly burned children.
2020	MAGIA [MAGIC] – Association of Volunteers for Children with Cancer	Organization founded in 2010 by Teresa Pasco to assist children with cancer.
2022	Vidawasi	Children's hospital founded in 2021 by Jesús Dongo, and located in the Sacred Valley of the Incas near Cusco. At the invitation of the hospital, the award ceremony was held on the premises of the hospital.
2024	Food Bank of Peru	Organization founded in 2014 and headed by Leslie Pierce that collects food that would otherwise go to waste, and provides it to the needy.
2026	Peruvian Cancer Foundation	Organization founded in 1960 to provide integral care for the neediest cancer patients in Peru and to raise the standards of care and treatment in the country.

It is worth observing that although the precise series of prize topics given in Dr. Campodonico's will is not followed, specific topics listed there have been awarded, for instance Peruvian archaeology (first year in the will, 2007 and 2015 prizes for professional accomplishment), art with an Incan theme (second year in will, 2010 prize for professional accomplishment), and studies on the Peruvian wart (second year in the will, 2009 prize for professional accomplishment).

== Award ==
The winner of the prize receives a commemorative medal, a diploma, and a monetary reward.

=== Medal ===
Originally, on the obverse of the medal there appeared the logo of the Esteban Campodónico Prize and the words "Premios ESTEBAN CAMPODONICO FIGALLO" ["Esteban Campodónico Figallo Prizes"]. Dr. Campodonico's maternal surname Figallo was included, in accordance with Spanish naming customs. In 2019, on the occasion of the 25th anniversary of the prize, the inscription was changed to "Premio Esteban Campodónico", dropping the maternal surname, to be in accordance with the name of the prize as specified in Dr. Campodonico's will. The reverse of the medal features the phrase "Premio Esteban Campodónico por servicios a la sociedad peruana" ["Esteban Campodónico Prize for services to Peruvian society"], accompanied by the area for which the prize was given: "Actividad Profesional Destacada" ["Outstanding Professional Activity"] or "Servicios Directos a la Sociedad" ["Direct Services to Society"].

=== Diploma ===
The diploma has the logos of the Clover Foundation, the University of Piura, and the Esteban Campodónico Prize at the top. Below those are the opening words (translated) "The Clover Foundation and the University of Piura recognize with the Esteban Campodónico Prize in the area of", then the area for which the prize was given, the name of the recipient, a short citation and the date. It is signed by the Rector of the University of Piura and a director of Clover Foundation.

=== Reward ===
The board of directors of the prize sets the monetary value of the reward each year, taking into account the amount disbursed to Clover by the Campodonico Foundation (5% of the value of the fund) and the expenses of operating the prize. In recent years the monetary reward has been USD 50,000, given as a check made out in US dollars.
