= Night Train (2007 film) =

2007 film by Diao Yinan

- Film poster
- Traditional Chinese: 夜車
- Simplified Chinese: 夜车
- Hanyu Pinyin: Yè chē
- Directed by: Diao Yinan
- Written by: Diao Yinan
- Produced by: Vivian Qu; Steve Chow
- Starring: Liu Dan; Qi Dao
- Cinematography: Dong Jingsong
- Edited by: Kong Jinglei
- Music by: Wen Zi
- Production companies: Fonds Sud Cinema; DViant Films
- Distributed by: MK2 Diffusion
- Release date: May 25, 2007 (Cannes)
- Running time: 94 minutes
- Country: China
- Language: Mandarin

Night Train is writer-director Diao Yinan's second feature film. Like his previous film, Uniform, Night Train takes place in Diao's home province of Shaanxi and was shot in and around Baoji.

Night Train premiered in the 2007 Cannes Film Festival as part of the Un Certain Regard competition and was one of only two Asian films (the other being Li Yang's Blind Mountain) in competition for an award. The film was produced by Diao's Beijing-based Ho-Hi Pictures with funding from French (Fonds Sud Cinema) and American (DViant Films) companies.

== Plot ==
The film follows a young woman, Wu Hongyan (Liu Dan), and works as a prison guard who aids in the execution of female prisoners. Lonely and widowed, Wu finds herself taking the night train to a dating service in a neighboring city.

After a series of unsuccessful dates, she meets Li Jun (Qi Dao), with whom she begins a relationship. It soon becomes clear that Li Jun is hiding a secret: that he is the widower of one of Wu's executed prisoners. Li Jun is torn both by his attraction to Wu, but also his desire to exact some sort of vengeance. Wu, meanwhile, must consider her own safety in this new volatile relationship.

== Cast ==
- Liu Dan as Wu Hongyan, a widow, now working on the execution
- Qi Dao as Li Jun, the husband to one of Wu's executed inmates, Li Jun and Wu embark on an unstable sexual relationship
- Xu Wei as Wu's first date
- Wu Yuxi as Wu's second date
- Wang Zhenjia as Wu's girlfriend
- Meng Haiyan as a new prisoner

== Reception ==
=== Awards and nominations ===
- 2007 Warsaw International Film Festival
  - Nescafe Grand Prix
- 2008 Buenos Aires International Festival of Independent Cinema
  - Best Actress — Liu Dan
  - Jury Special Prize
