= DViant Films =

- Company type: Production Company
- Industry: Movie, Film
- Founded: 2005
- Founder: Julien Favre; Luca Matrundola; Pascal Vaguelsy
- Headquarters: Los Angeles, United States
- Number of locations: 3

DViant Films is an independent film production company founded in 2005 by Julien Favre, Luca Matrundola and Pascal Vaguelsy.

== History ==
DViant Films is an independent film production company founded by Julien Favre, Luca Matrundola and Pascal Vaguelsy. The company was started in California in 2005. DViant Films set up a sister company in Toronto in 2009, followed in 2012 by an Asian office in Bangkok, Thailand.

DViant Films kickstarted their activities in with three short films, Damn the past! directed by Juli Kang, Winter Sea directed by Erika Tasini, and West Bank Story directed by Ari Sandel, which won the Academy Award.

In 2007, DViant Films co-produced their first feature film Night Train, written and directed by Chinese filmmaker Diao Yinan. The film premiered at the Cannes Film Festival in the Un Certain Regard section.

In 2009, DViant Films produced Martin Donovan's first feature Collaborator, in association with indie producing legend Ted Hope. Collaborator stars Donovan, David Morse and Olivia Williams. The film premiered at the Karlovy Vary Film Festival, where it won the International Critics Prize (FIPRESCI) and a Best Actor award for David Morse. In 2010, Favre became one of the six producers across the United States selected for the first Sundance Institute's Creative Producing Lab.

In 2011, DViant Films produced Arcadia, starring Ryan Simpkins and Academy Award nominee John Hawkes. The film premiered at the Berlinale 2012 and won the Crystal Bear. Also in 2011, DViant Films produced The Story of Luke, in association with Fluid Film and Fred Roos. The film, starring Lou Pucci and Seth Green, premiered at the San Diego Film Festival where it won Best Film.

== Filmography ==
=== Short films ===
- Winter Sea (2005)
- West Bank Story (2005)
- Damn the past! (2006)

=== Feature films ===
- Night Train (2007)
- Collaborator (2010)
- Arcadia (2012)
- The Story Of Luke (2012)
