= Judith M. LeBlanc =

American psychologist

- Born: January 3, 1936 (age 90); Beaumont, Texas, U.S.
- Education: University of Kansas, Pittsburg State University; Southern Methodist University
- Occupation: Psychologist
- Employer(s): Centro Ann Sullivan del Perú; University of Kansas
- Known for: Functional natural curriculum

Judith M. LeBlanc (born January 3, 1936) is an American psychologist, teacher and special education researcher.

== Biography ==
Judith M. LeBlanc is head consultant of the Centro Ann Sullivan del Perú. She is the main architect of the center's Functional natural curriculum methodology and along with Liliana Mayo developed the center's distance education program. LeBlanc is professor emeritus of the University of Kansas departments of Applied Behavioral Science and Special Education. She is the coordinator of international programs at the Schiefelbusch Institute for Research in Life Span Studies.

LeBlanc received her B.S. degree in psychology from Southern Methodist University, her M.A. from Pittsburg State University and her Ph.D. in developmental and child psychology from the University of Kansas.

== Recognition ==
In 1991, LeBlanc was awarded an Outstanding Contribution Award for International Development by the Association for Behavior Analysis. She is an honorary distinguished professor of the Universidad Peruana Cayetano Heredia and of the Universidad Inca Garcilaso de la Vega. LeBlanc has been inducted to the University of Kansas Women's Hall of Fame.

== Publications ==
=== Selected books and chapters ===
- LeBlanc, J.M., Reuter, K.E., Miller, D.N., & Schilmoeller, G.L. (1977). Laboratory investigations of applied behavior analysis techniques: Procedures designed to decrease or eliminate responding. In B.C. Etzel, J.M. LeBlanc, & D.M. Baer (Eds.). New Developments in behavioral research: Theory, method and application. In honor of Sidney W. Bijou. New Jersey: Lawrence Erlbaum Associates, Inc.
- LeBlanc, J.M., Etzel, B.C., & Domash, M.A. (1978). A functional curriculum for intervention. In K.E. Allen, V.A. Holm, & R.L. Schiefelbusch (Eds.). Early intervention....a team approach. Baltimore: University Park Press.
- Etzel, B.C., LeBlanc, J.M., Schilmoeller, K.J., & Stella, M.E. (1981). Stimulus control procedures in the education of young children. In S.W. Bijou and R. Ruez (Eds.). Contributions of Behavior Modification to Education. Hillsdale, N.J.: Lawrence Erlbaum Associates.
- LeBlanc, J.M. (1982). Enhancing the instructional environment for optimal teaching. In Elizabeth M. Goetz and K. Eileen Allen (Eds.) Problems in Early Childhood Education, Aspen Publishing Company.
- Ruggles, T.R. & LeBlanc, J.M. (1982). Behavior analysis procedures in classroom teaching. In Bellach, A., Hersen, M., and Kazdin, A. (Eds.). International handbook of behavior modification, Plenum Press.
- LeBlanc, J.M., Schroeder, S.R., Mayo, Y.L. (1996) A Life Span Approach in the Education and Treatment of Persons with Autism. In Cohen, D. & Volkmar, F.R. (Eds). Handbook of Autism and Pervasive Developmental Disorders, Second Edition. New York: Wiley Publishing
- McCartney, L.L.A. & LeBlanc, J.M. (1997) Errorless learning in educational environments: Using criterion-related cues to reduce errors. In Baer, D.M. & Pinkston, E.M. (Eds). Environment and Behavior, Boulder: Westview Press.

=== Selected journal articles ===
- Pinkston, E.M., Reese, N., LeBlanc, J.M., & Baer, D.M. (1973). Independent control of aggression and peer interaction by contingent teacher attention. Journal of Applied Behavior Analysis, 6, 115-124.
- Hardiman, S.A., Goetz, E.M., Reuter, K.E., & LeBlanc, J.M. (1975). Contingent attention, primes, and training: A comparison of the effects on a child's motor behavior. Journal of Applied Behavior Analysis, 8, 399–409.
- LeBlanc, Judith M. & Ruggles, Ted R. (1982). Instructional Strategies for individual and group teaching. Analysis and Intervention of Developmental Disabilities, 2, #2/3, pp. 129–137.
- LeBlanc, J.M., Hoko, J.A., Aangeenbrug, M.A., & Etzel, B.C. (1985). Microcomputer and stimulus control: From the laboratory to the classroom. Journal of Special Education Technology, 6, No. 7, 23–30.
- MacDonald, R.P.F., Dixon, L.S., & LeBlanc, J.M. (1986). Stimulus equivalence: Effects on observational learning. Analysis and Intervention of Developmental Disabilities, 6, No. 1/2, 73–87.
- Hoko, J.A. & LeBlanc, J.M. (1988). Error analysis and stimulus equalization: Procedures to facilitate visual discriminations of children with learning problems. Research in Developmental Disabilities. 9, #3, 255–275.
- Sweeney, H.M. & LeBlanc, J.M. (1995) Effects of task size on work-related and aberrant behaviors of youths with autism and mental retardation. Research in Developmental Disabilities, 16, #2, pp. 97–115.
- Schroeder, S.R., LeBlanc, J.M., & Mayo, L. (1996) A life span perspective on the development of individuals with autism. Journal of Autism and Developmental Disabilities.
