= Miss Perú 1994 =

- Date: April 10th, 1994
- Presenters: Antonio Vodanovic, Jessica Newton
- Venue: Laguna de Huacachina, Ica
- Broadcaster: Andina de Televisión
- Entrants: 24
- Withdrawals: Áncash
- Winner: Karina Calmet; Callao

The Miss Perú 1994 pageant was held on April 10, 1994. That year, 24 candidates were competing for the national crown. The chosen winner represented Peru at the Miss Universe 1994. The rest of the finalists would enter in different pageants.

== Placements ==
Final Results	Contestant
Miss Peru Universe 1994	Callao - Karina Calmet
Miss Peru Asia-Pacific 1994	Madre de Dios - Jessica Tapia
Miss International Peru 1994	Amazonas - Lidia Ferrari
1st Runner-Up	Cuzco - Viviana Cisneros
2nd Runner-Up	Ayacucho - Natalia Ruiz
Top 10	Pasco - Wendy Wunder; Cajamarca - Cecilia Brozovich; Distrito Capital - Karoline Haffner; La Libertad - Sandra Otoya; Ica - Sandra Delgado

== Special awards ==
- Best Regional Costume - Lambayeque - Claudia Muñiz
- Miss Photogenic - Amazonas - Lidia Ferrari
- Miss Elegance - Loreto - Patricia Cabanillas
- Miss Body - Ica - Sandra Delgado
- Best Hair - Cajamarca - Cecilia Brozovich
- Miss Congeniality - Callao - Karina Calmet
- Most Beautiful Face - Amazonas - Lidia Ferrari

.

== Delegates ==
- Amazonas - Lidia Ferrari
- Apurímac - Celia Alvarado
- Arequipa - Claudia Fernández
- Ayacucho - Natalia Ruiz
- Cajamarca - Cecilia Brozovich
- Callao - Karina Calmet
- Cuzco - Viviana Cisneros
- Distrito Capital - Karoline Haffner
- Huancavelica - Mónica Cabanillas
- Huánuco - Giuliana Malpartida
- Ica - Sandra Delgado
- Junín - Maripili Barreda
- La Libertad - Sandra Otoya
- Lambayeque - Claudia Muñiz
- Loreto - Patricia Cabanillas
- Madre de Dios - Jessica Tapia
- Moquegua - Claudia Rivera
- Pasco - Wendy Wunder
- Piura - Claudia Torrejón
- Puno - Luz María Chang
- San Martín - Ivette Alba
- Tacna - Katherine Zugby
- Tumbes - Ruber Ferrer Vitola
- Ucayali - Flor de María Rivera

== Trivia ==
- Cecilia Brozovich celebrated her 18th birthday during the Miss Peru 1994 finals.
- Jessica Tapia became the first Latin American woman to win the Miss Asia-Pacific title.
- Lidia Ferrari was not being able to travel to participate in the Miss International pageant for undisclosed reasons.
- Viviana Cisneros was replaced by Karina Calmet, for Miss Hispanidad pageant because she had to withdraw due to a leg injury. Karina Won the pageant that year.
- The outgoing titleholder Deborah D'Souza Peixoto sported the same Evening Gown (when she crowned her successor) that Miss Amazonas 1989, Ana Rosa Vick, wore during Miss Peru 1989.

== Judges ==
- Madeline Hartog-Bel - Miss World 1967
- Juan Giha - Peruvian shooter & Olympic medalist
- Javier Blanco - Regional Manager of San Antonio (Mineral water)
- Norka Peralta - Peruvian Designer
- Renata Reiche Neuman - President of the foundation to preserve the Nazca Lines
- Francesca Zaza - Miss Peru 1982
- Guillermo Arguedas - General Manager of Mossone Hotel
- Dr. Max Álvarez - Plastic Surgeon
- Nelly Silva - Peruvian Painter
- Jean Paul Strauss - Peruvian Singer

== Background Music ==
- Opening Show – Miss Peru Anthem (composed by Coco Tafur)
- Parade of Regions – Strunz & Farah - "El Jaguar"
- Swimsuit Competition – Samir Giha - "25 Boleros Medley"
- Evening Gown Competition – Raul Di Blasio - "Amarraditos" & "La Flor De La Canela"

== Special Guests Singers ==
- Elsa Maria Elejalde - "El Dia Que Te Vuelva A Besar" & "Europa"
- Guillermo Dávila - "Barco A La Deriva" & "Cuando Se Acaba El Amor"
- Francesc Picas - "Amor Por Bandera" & "Locos Por Amor"
