= The Story of Luke =

- Theatrical release poster
- Directed by: Alonso Mayo
- Written by: Alonso Mayo
- Produced by: Julien Favre; Nina Leidersdorff; Fred Roos
- Starring: Lou Taylor Pucci; Seth Green; Cary Elwes; Kristin Bauer
- Cinematography: David Klein
- Edited by: Vikash Patel
- Music by: Mateo Messina
- Production companies: DViant Films; Fluid Film
- Distributed by: Gravitas Ventures
- Release dates: September 29, 2012 (San Diego Film Festival); April 5, 2013 (United States)
- Running time: 95 minutes
- Country: United States
- Language: English

The Story of Luke is a 2012 American comedy drama film written and directed by Alonso Mayo. It is Mayo's first feature-length film and tells the story of Luke, a young man with autism who embarks on a quest for a job and a girlfriend. It stars Lou Taylor Pucci, Seth Green, Cary Elwes and Kristin Bauer.

== Cast ==
- Lou Taylor Pucci as Luke
- Seth Green as Zack
- Cary Elwes as Paul
- Kristin Bauer as Cindy
- Kenneth Welsh as Jonas
- Tyler Stentiford as Brad
- Mackenzie Munro as Megan
- Sabryn Rock as Maria
- Lisa Ryder as Sara
- Zoë Belkin as Charlene
- Dewshane Williams as Sam
- Art Hindle as Mr. Nichols
- Michael Kinney as Counselor Bobby
- John Boylan as Mr. Harrison

== Production ==
=== Development ===
The film was inspired by director Alonso Mayo's experiences at Centro Ann Sullivan del Perú. While finishing his undergrad studies in film and journalism in Peru, Mayo helped produce a series of training videos for creating supported employment programs and met many men and women with autism and other developmental disabilities. Later, while writing the screenplay for The Story of Luke, Mayo returned to Centro Ann Sullivan del Perú on a research trip and shot the documentary Just Like Anyone.

=== Filming ===
The Story of Luke was produced by DViant Films and Fluid Film. Filming took place in Sault Ste. Marie, Ontario, Canada in 23 days in August and September 2011. To prepare for the role of Luke, Lou Taylor Pucci spent time with young men with autism spectrum disorders in Sault Ste. Marie.

== Release ==
The Story of Luke premiered at the 2012 San Diego Film Festival, where it won Best Film. It has gone on to win over 20 film festival awards including Best Film at San Antonio Film Festival, Garden State Film Festival and San Luis Obispo International Film Festival. It was released theatrically and on demand in the United States and Canada on April 5, 2013 by Gravitas Ventures. It was released on DVD on August 6, 2013.

== Reception ==
=== Autism community reception ===
The Story of Luke received positive reviews from the autism community, especially for Lou Taylor Pucci's portrayal of a man with autism. Psychology Today columnist and autism advocate Chantal Sicile-Kira wrote, "Most parents of youths with autism will find this movie uplifting and encouraging—we all hope and wish our youths will be successful in finding employment and someone to love… Lou Taylor Pucci's portrayal of Luke is spot on. His manners, gestures and tone of voice feel authentic."

The film also received the endorsement of advocacy organization Autism Speaks. Leslie Long, Director of Housing and Adult Services wrote, "Luke transforms the people around him that were under the assumption they would be caring for him. This is not unique but not often discussed either. Most people have not had the pleasure of really knowing someone with autism in all facets of their lives so they miss the nuances of their humor or the effortless ways they tell the whole truth."

=== Critical reception ===
The Story of Luke garnered mostly positive reviews from film critics. Review aggregator Rotten Tomatoes gives the film an 80% approval rating based on 5 reviews.

Mark Olsen of the Los Angeles Times wrote, "Mayo's script avoids turning Luke into some wise holy fool, allowing him to make missteps along the way... "The Story of Luke" is not a saga of epic proportions, but with a huge assist from Pucci's layered performance, takes a premise that could easily be movie-of-the-week sappy and finds a humanizing lightness."

Daniel M. Gold of The New York Times wrote, "Mr. Pucci (“Thumbsucker,” “The Music Never Stopped”) gives a thoughtful and nuanced performance but gets few favors from the script, which puts him front and center in almost every scene... the film serves as a modest reminder that the challenges of autism may sometimes be no more daunting or fearsome than those that face anyone in search of an independent life."

In a more mixed review, Chuck Wilson of The Village Voice called it "a charming little film in need of a bit more grit… Luke faces challenges, to be sure, both within himself and out in the world, but even the meanies at the office are only sitcom-mean. In the end, Luke's path to self-empowerment is funny and sweet and a little too easy."

=== Accolades ===
List of awards and nominations
Award	Date of ceremony	Category	Recipients and nominees	Result
San Diego Film Festival	September 29, 2012	Best Film	The Story of Luke	Won
Fort Lauderdale International Film Festival	November 14, 2012	Audience Award for Best American Indie	The Story of Luke	Won
Bahamas International Film Festival	December 9, 2012	Audience Award for Best Narrative	The Story of Luke	Won
Irvine International Film Festival	January 21, 2013	Best Feature Narrative	The Story of Luke	Won
Irvine International Film Festival	January 21, 2013	Best 1st Time Director	Alonso Mayo	Won
Irvine International Film Festival	January 21, 2013	Best Actor	Lou Taylor Pucci	Won
Irvine International Film Festival	January 21, 2013	Best Trailer	The Story of Luke	Won
The Saint Augustine Film Festival	January 25, 2013	People's Choice Award for Best Film	The Story of Luke	Won
San Francisco IndieFest	February 22, 2013	Audience Award for Best Narrative Feature	The Story of Luke	Won
Festivus film festival	February 23, 2013	Best Narrative Feature	The Story of Luke	Won
San Luis Obispo International Film Festival	March 9, 2013	Best Narrative Feature	The Story of Luke	Won
San Luis Obispo International Film Festival	March 9, 2013	Audience Award for Best Narrative Film	The Story of Luke	Won
Omaha Film Festival	March 12, 2013	Audience Choice Award for Best Feature Film	The Story of Luke	Won
Green Bay Film Festival	March 14, 2013	Film Lovers Choice Award	The Story of Luke	Won
Green Bay Film Festival	March 14, 2013	Best Screenplay	Alonso Mayo	Won
Phoenix Film Festival	April 8, 2013	Special Jury Prize	Lou Taylor Pucci	Won
Garden State Film Festival	April 8, 2013	Best Narrative Feature	The Story of Luke	Won
Sunscreen Film Festival	April 23, 2013	Best Film	The Story of Luke	Won
Arizona International Film Festival	April 28, 2013	Special Jury Award for Best Performance	Lou Taylor Pucci	Won
San Antonio Film Festival	June 24, 2013	Grand Prize for Best Film	The Story of Luke	Won
Cinéfest Sudbury International Film Festival	September 23, 2013	Best Northern Ontario Feature Film	The Story of Luke	Won
