= Ann Sullivan =

Ann or Anne Sullivan may refer to:

- Ann Sullivan (animator) (1929–2020), American animator
- Anne Sullivan (1866–1936), American teacher
- Anne Grosvenor, Duchess of Westminster (1915–2003), Irish-born peeress
- Anne Sullivan (Pretty Little Liars), character from the television show Pretty Little Liars

== See also ==
- Centro Ann Sullivan del Perú, NGO in Peru
