= B6 (musician) =

Chinese musician

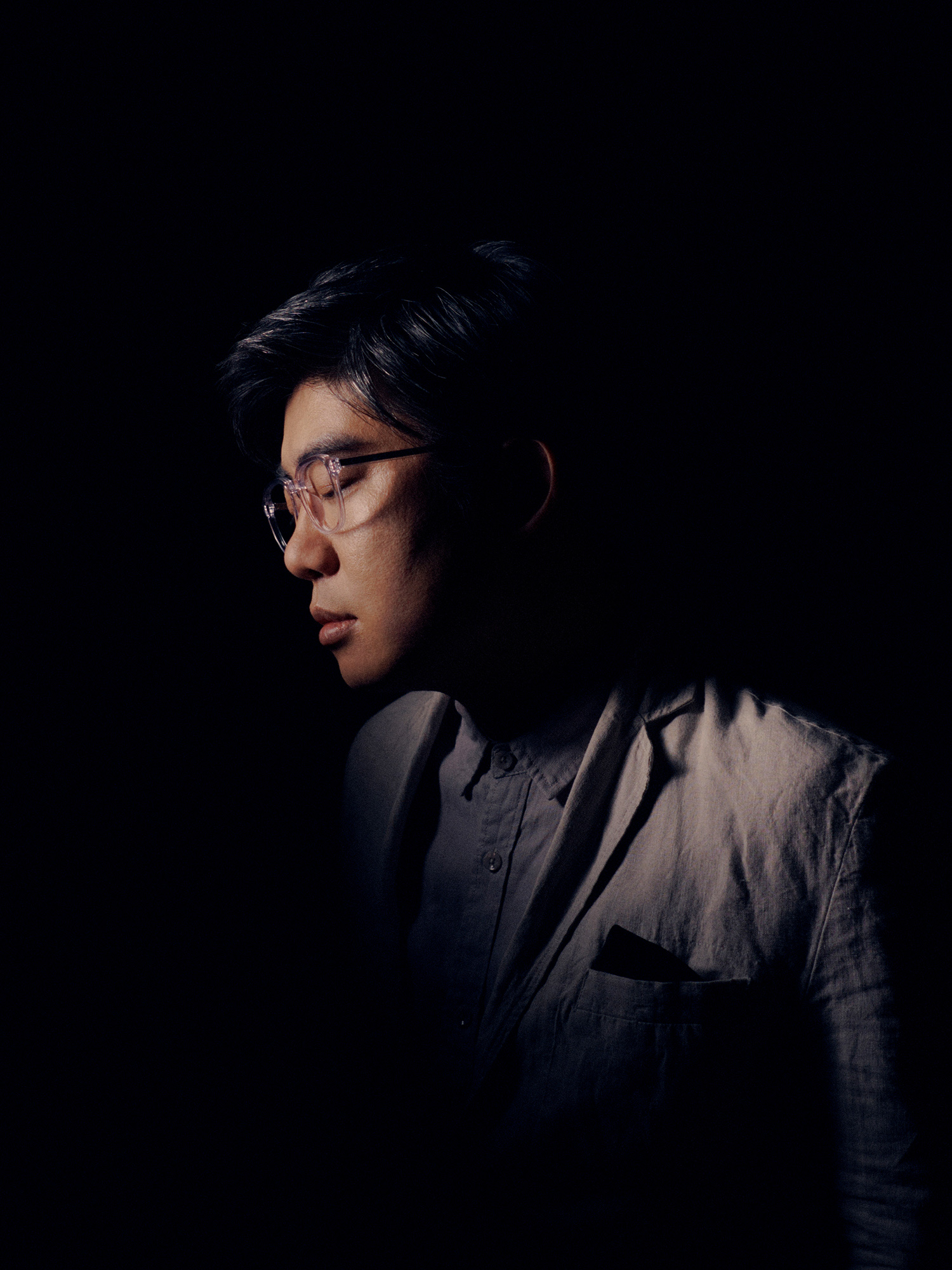
- B6 in 2021

Background information
- Origin: Shanghai, China
- Genres: Film score, Electronic music
- Years active: 1999-present

B6 (formerly known as Lou Nanli), was born and raised in Shanghai, China. He began creating electronic music in 1999 and is renowned as an electronic musician, composer, sound artist, and visual installation artist.

== Biography ==
=== 1999–2007: experimental music and label founding ===
In 1999, B6 founded the experimental music label "Isolation Music", which released avant-garde music in various genres, including experimental electronic, sound art, ambient, and industrial noise. B6 also designed album covers for independent music releases in China, created concert posters, and contributed to art installations and video art scores. His visual and installation art, created under the name Lou Nanli, has been exhibited in galleries and museums both in China and abroad.

From 2003 to 2006, B6 produced and released several IDM and ambient music works. In 2006, he compiled and released "B6 Box", a 6-CD box set containing previously published and unpublished works, which was distributed overseas by Rough Trade and sold out within a month. The same year, B6 formed the synth-pop duo IGO with singer J Jay and released the album "Synth Love" under Modern Sky Beijing and Universal Music Hong Kong.

=== 2008–2012: minimal techno and pop music production ===
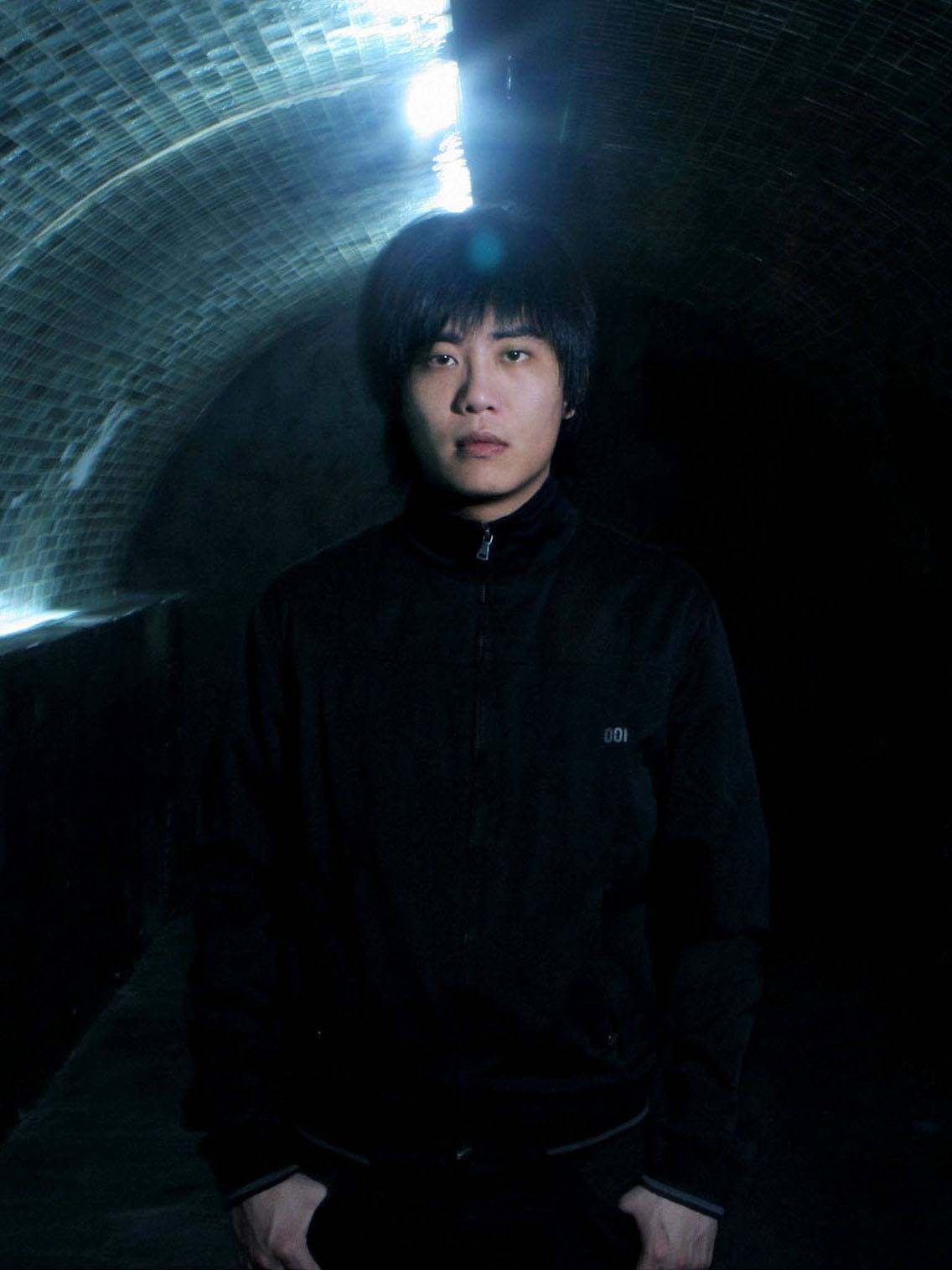
B6 in 2008

In 2008, B6 released the album "Post Haze" under Modern Sky, featuring a minimal techno style. The album was reissued by Swedish label Sub-Stream in 2009, along with a remix album titled "Post Haze Remixes", featuring collaborations with international producers and DJs.

In 2009, B6 gained recognition in the European electronic music scene through singles and remixes. He participated in artist residencies at institutions in France, Germany, Switzerland, and Scandinavian countries, dividing his time between Europe and China. During this period, B6 completed electronic music and multimedia art projects and performed at venues and festivals worldwide, including Tresor (Berlin), Total Confusion Party (Cologne), Distortion and Spot Festival (Denmark), Cité de la Musique (Paris), Volt Festival (Sweden), Vooruit (Belgium), Museum of Contemporary Art Australia, Asia Force (Japan), Esplanade – Theatres on the Bay (Singapore), and the Shanghai World Expo.

Concurrently, B6 collaborated as a producer with Chinese musicians and singers, including Li Quan, Wang Xiaokun, and Tan Weiwei, resulting in chart-topping singles and awards. B6's early single "My Post-Rock Yard" was featured in the UN's official promotional video for China in 2012.

=== 2012–2017: multimedia art and silent films ===
From 2012 to 2017, under his real name Lou Nanli, B6 worked on multimedia installations, video art, and conceptual art. His works often combined multi-screen imagery with surround sound and were exhibited in collaboration with art institutions and projects in China and abroad. Notable works include the video series "Sounds of the City", installations "Watching The Rain", "LUSID", "Spectrogram", and "Cube", and sound works "Shanghai Cussing" and "Unknown Pass".

In 2014, B6 composed music for the rediscovered silent film The Cave of the Silken Web (1927 film) and performed live at the Shanghai International Film Festival's closing ceremony. The film and live performances were subsequently staged in China and overseas. From 2016 to 2017, B6 collaborated with classical musicians to recompose and produce classical music pieces, combining them with the installation "Cube" for exhibitions and performances at various venues in Shanghai.

=== 2018–2023: theatre, television and film scoring ===
In 2018, B6 composed music for the stage play "Blooms", based on the work of writer Jin Yucheng. The play premiered in Shanghai and Beijing and won the Annual Best Play Award at the 2019 Yixi Drama Awards. B6 also composed music for the second season of the TV documentary series "Life Matters", which won the Best Documentary Series Award at the Magnolia Awards.

In 2019, B6 composed the score for Diao Yinan's film The Wild Goose Lake, which was nominated for the Palme d'Or at the 72nd Cannes Film Festival and grossed over $31 million worldwide. He also composed music for Tiffany & Co.'s exhibition "Vision & Virtuosity" and released a vinyl album of the same name under Modern Sky.

In 2021, B6 composed the music for the short fashion film "Salvatore Ferragamo - Campaign Spring Summer 2021" by Italian filmmaker Luca Guadagnino.

From 2020 to 2023, B6 composed music for various projects, including the Wuhan epidemic documentary "Level-1", the animated film "To The Bright Side" (winner of the Best Feature Film Award at the 2022 New York International Children's Film Festival), Wang Mu's film "Awakening Spring" (winner of three major awards at the 2022 Pingyao International Film Festival), the TV drama "Infernal Affairs", Zhang Ji's film "Fire On The Plain", the second season of the stage play "Blooms", and the documentary series "Flowing China".

B6 also scored Liang Ming's film "Carefree Days" (nominated for the New Director Section at the San Sebastián International Film Festival and winner of top awards at international festivals) and Luo Dong's film "May" (winner of the Best Director Award in Asian New Talents Section at Shanghai International Film Festival and invited to World Focus Section at Tokyo International Film Festival in 2023).

In 2023, B6 released several music projects, including a 4-CD box set, vinyl releases of soundtracks, and a five-day film score exhibition in Shanghai.

In 2024, he began composing music for Li Shaohong's television drama "Hunting" and released a retrospective vinyl anthology under Shengun Records.

== Discography ==
=== Music Score ===
- 2024 - "Blossoms - Season III", Theater play, Junfeng Ma (TBC)
- 2024 - "Hunting", TV Series, Shaohong Li
- 2023 - "Yi Lu Qian Xing", TV Documentary Series, Bo Qin
- 2023 - "Carefree Days", Feature Film, Ming Liang
- 2023 - "May", Feature Film, Dong Luo
- 2023 - "Infernal Affairs", TV Series, Dao Qi
- 2023 - "Lan Kao", Theater play, Junfeng Ma
- 2023 - "Awakening Spring", Feature Film, Mu Wang
- 2022 - "Dear Mother, I Meant To Write About Death", Documentary Film, Siyi Chen
- 2022 - "Second Life", TV Documentary Series, Bo Qin
- 2021 - "Blossoms - Season II", Theater play, Junfeng Ma
- 2021 - "Fire On The Plain", Feature Film, Ji Zhang
- 2021 - "The Storage", Documentary Film, Danyan Chen
- 2021 - "To The Bright Side", Animation Film, VA
- 2021 - "Having A Good Time", Short Film, Beier Zhong
- 2020 - "Brawl Stars", Short Film, Yinan Diao
- 2020 - "Salvatore Ferragamo - Campaign Spring Summer 2021", Short Film, Luca Guadagnino
- 2020 - "Flowing China", TV Documentary Series, Shiguang Fan
- 2020 - "Level One", TV Documentary Series, Shiguang Fan
- 2020 - "Life Matters - Special Anti-Epidemic Program", TV Documentary Series, Shiguang Fan
- 2019 - "Vision & Virtuosity", Exhibition, Tiffany & Co.
- 2019 - "Wild Goose Lake", Feature Film, Yinan Diao
- 2019 - "Life Matters - Season II", TV Documentary Series, Bo Qin & Shiguang Fan
- 2018 - "Blossoms - Season I", Theater play, Junfeng Ma
- 2018 - "Suspense", Silent Film, Lois Weber (1913), Tromsø International Film Festival
- 2014 - "The Cave of the Silken Web", Silent Film, Duyu Dan (1927), Shanghai International Film Festival
- 2012 - "2032: The Future We Want", Short Film, Jiayi Du

=== Music Release ===
- 2024 - B6 - "The Mystic Blue" (TBC)
- 2024 - B6 - "Carefree Days OST" (TBC)
- 2024 - B6 - "The Wild Goose Lake OST" (TBC)
- 2024 - B6 - "Anthology 2001-2011" (2 Vinyl)
- 2023 - B6 - "Infernal Affairs" (Digital)
- 2023 - IGO - "Synth Love" (2023 Remastered) (2 Vinyl + Digital)
- 2023 - B6 - "Music For Television Documentary Series 2018-2022" (4CD Boxset + Digital)
- 2023 - B6 - "Awakening Spring OST" (CD + Digital)
- 2023 - B6 - "Blossoms Season I & II OST" (2 Vinyl + Digital)
- 2022 - B6 - "Life Matters OST" (Vinyl + Digital)
- 2022 - B6 - "To The Bright Side OST" (CD + Digital)
- 2019 - B6 - "Vision & Virtuosity" (Vinyl)
- 2012 - B6 - "Bomb In The Shelter" (CD)
- 2009 - B6 - "Post Haze" (EU Release) (Digital)
- 2008 - B6 - "PostHaze" (CD + Digital)
- 2007 - IGO - "Synth Love" (HK Release) (CD)
- 2007 - IGO - "Synth Love" (CD + Digital)
- 2005 - B6 - "B6Box" (6 Mini CD Boxset)
- 2005 - B6 - "My Post-Rock Yard EP" (Mini CD)
- 2004 - B6 - "Electronic For Trips EP" (Mini CD)
- 2004 - B6 - "Little 9 EP" (Mini CD)
- 2004 - Dust Box - "Tuesday" (CD)

=== Art Work ===
- 2017 - "Spectrogram - 6 Elements", Digital Video
- 2016 - "Sound of the City #3", Video
- 2015 - "Le Petit Cube", Installation
- 2015 - "Cube - Gaze", Installation
- 2015 - "Cube 00/01/02/03", Installation
- 2014 - "The Interview", Video

== Associated Acts and Collaborations ==
- AITAR - Composed of B6 and Mhp (Ma Hai-Ping), AITAR is an industrial noise duo that released its self-titled album in 2001 and AITAR II, its second album, in 2004.
- Dust Box - Together with Cy, B6 released the album Tuesday in 2004 under the collaborative moniker Dust Box.
- Igo - In 2007, B6 and J Jay released the album Synth Love as Igo.
- ISMU - ISMU, or Intelligent Shanghai Mono University, is an electronic music collective featuring B6, Cy, Susuxx, and Zoojoo. The album 7.9 was released in 2003.
- Junkyard - B6 was also a former member of the group Junkyard.
