= Arcadia (2012 film) =

- Directed by: Olivia Silver
- Written by: Olivia Silver
- Produced by: Julien Favre; Jai Stefan; Silenn Thomas
- Starring: John Hawkes; Ryan Simpkins; Ty Simpkins; Kendall Toole
- Cinematography: Eric Lin
- Edited by: Jennifer Lee
- Music by: The Low Anthem
- Production companies: DViant Films; Madrose Productions; Poisson Rouge Pictures; Shrink Media
- Release dates: February 13, 2012 (DE); October 13, 2012 (US)
- Running time: 90 minutes
- Country: United States
- Language: English

Arcadia is a 2012 American drama film written and directed by Olivia Silver, produced by A Poisson Rouge Pictures and DViant Films. It won the Crystal Bears, Generation Kplus at 2012 Berlinale and the Grand Prize at the Cine Junior Festival.

== Premise ==
Twelve-year-old Greta's dad Tom is moving the kids cross-country, promising a California paradise and packing half the household into a dented station wagon. Mom is supposed to join them later. But as they travel through forests, plains and deserts, stopping at fast food joints, shoddy motels, and a poor substitute for the Grand Canyon, Greta gradually realizes that her family is falling apart.

== Cast ==
- John Hawkes as Tom
- Ryan Simpkins as Greta
- Ty Simpkins as Nat
- Kendall Toole as Caroline

== Critical reception ==
Arcadia scored highly with critics, and played to sold out theaters at the Berlin Film Festival. Manohla Dargis of The New York Times wrote: "Ms. Silver’s ability to translate the liminal into cinematic terms, to catch those moments between innocence and knowing, childhood and adulthood, unforgiving and forgiving, makes her someone to watch".

== Awards and nominations ==
- 62nd Berlin International Film Festival
  - Crystal Bear, Generation Kplus
- 23rd Cine Junior Festival
  - Grand Prize at the Cine Junior Festival
  - "Grain à Démoudre" Prize (from young people aged 10–25 years)
- 13th Woodstock Film Festival
  - Official selection
