= Collaborator (film) =

- Directed by: Martin Donovan
- Written by: Martin Donovan
- Produced by: Julien Favre; Luca Matrundola; Pascal Vaguelsy; Ted Hope
- Starring: Martin Donovan; David Morse; Olivia Williams; Melissa Auf der Maur; Katherine Helmond; Eileen Ryan
- Cinematography: Julie Kirkwood
- Edited by: Karen Porter
- Music by: Manels Favre
- Production companies: DViant Films; This is that
- Distributed by: Tribeca Film (United States); Entertainment One (International)
- Release dates: July 4, 2011 (Karlovy Vary Film Festival); June 18, 2012 (United States)
- Running time: 87 minutes
- Country: United States
- Language: English

Collaborator is a 2011 American drama film written and directed by Martin Donovan. The film had its world premiere on July 4, 2011, at the Karlovy Vary International Film Festival. The film stars Donovan and the two-time Emmy-nominee David Morse, with Olivia Williams, Melissa Auf der Maur, Katherine Helmond and Eileen Ryan in supporting roles

== Plot ==
Robert Longfellow, a once-successful playwright, is taken hostage at gunpoint by an ex-con neighbor, Gus, while on a routine visit to his childhood home. Longfellow has avoided Gus since he was a boy. As the drama unfolds, social status, celebrity, politics, and the threat of violence converge, leaving the playwright simultaneously shattered and inspired.

== Cast ==
- Martin Donovan as Robert Longfellow
- David Morse as Gus
- Olivia Williams as Emma Stiles
- Melissa Auf der Maur as Alice Longfellow
- Katherine Helmond as Irene Longfellow
- Eileen Ryan as Betty
- Julian Richings as Maurice LeFont

== Awards and nominations ==
- 46th Karlovy Vary International Film Festival (2011)
  - Best Actor — David Morse
  - Award of International Film Critics (FIPRESCI)
- 1st Canadian Screen Awards (2013)
  - Nominated: Best Performance by an Actor in a Leading Role — David Morse

== Production ==
DViant Films and This Is That Productions produced Collaborator. The film's score was composed by Manels Favre. The soundtrack also includes a Brahms cover performed by PJ Harvey. Filming took place in Los Angeles and Sault Ste. Marie, Ontario, Canada.

== Reception ==
As of January 2023, the film has a 73% rating on Rotten Tomatoes from 26 reviews.

The New York Times found it "earnest" and "wooden", like a one-act play "in which any visceral tension is secondary to topical debates by a captor and his prisoner". The Los Angeles Times found it "disappointing" and "somber", failing to generate any tension from its thriller elements.

The Globe and Mail awarded it 2.5/5 and Adam Litovitz criticised some stagy elements but praised the film as a study of character. The New York Post praised the performances, saying "both characters are riveting".
