= National Institute of Neoplastic Diseases =

Hospital in Lima, Peru

- Ministry of Health (MINSA)
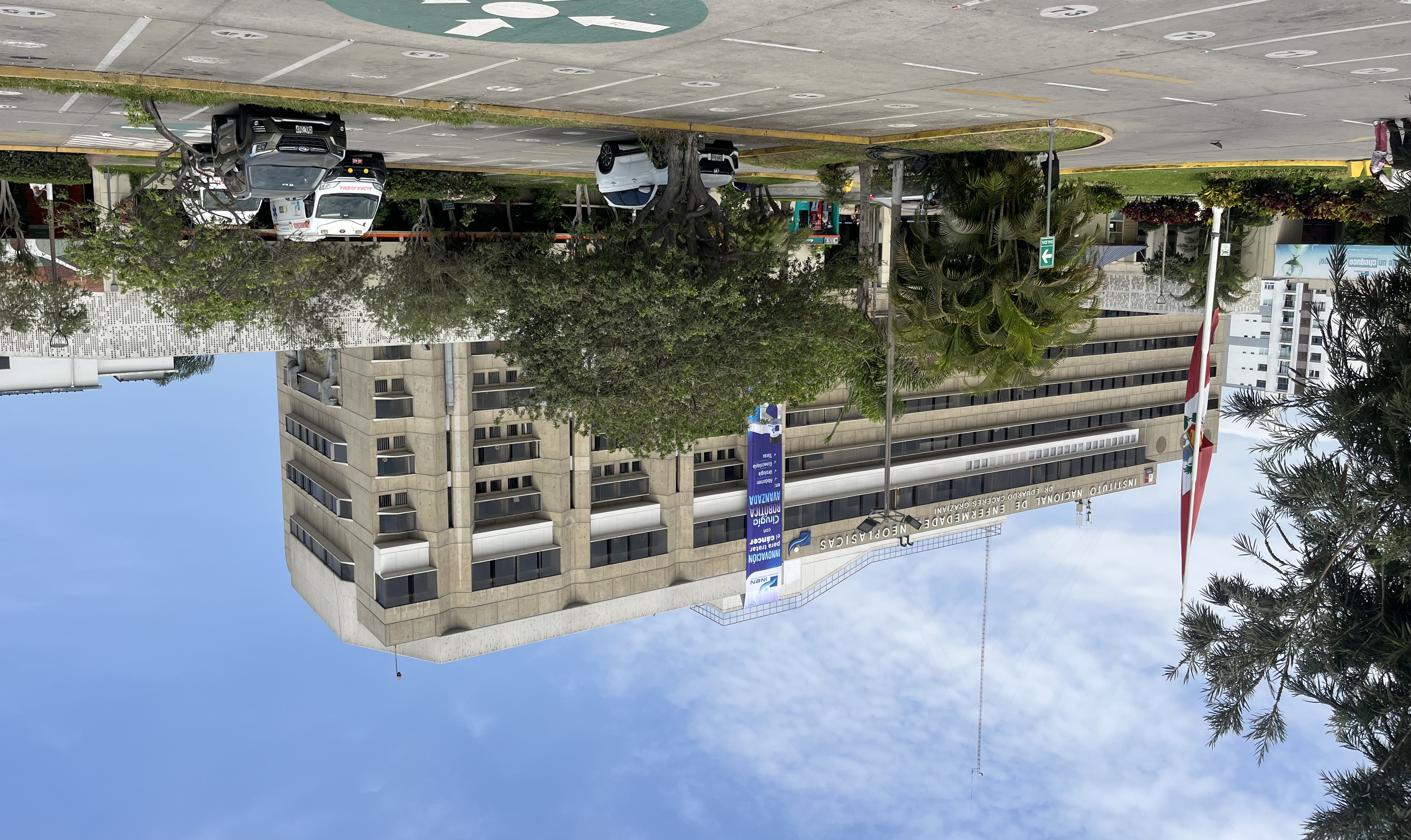

Geography
- Location: Angamos Este 2520, Surquillo, Lima, Peru

Organisation
- Religious affiliation: Catholicism

History
- Opened: December 4, 1939

Links
- Website: portal.inen.sld.pe

The National Institute of Neoplastic Diseases (Spanish: Instituto Nacional de Enfermedades Neoplásicas; INEN) is a public specialised healthcare centre in Surquillo, Lima, Peru. The institute is administered by the Ministry of Health (MINSA) and named after Peruvian oncologist Eduardo Cáceres Graziani (1913–2010), considered the "Father of Peruvian Oncology."

== History ==
The National Cancer Institute (Instituto Nacional del Cáncer; INC) was established through law No. 8892 of May 11, 1939. On May 13, the first stone for its destined hospital building was laid. The hospital, located at No. 825 of Alfonso Ugarte Avenue, was inaugurated on December 4 by president Óscar R. Benavides and Minister of Health Guillermo Almenara. On January 1, 1952, the INC was renamed to the National Radiotherapy Institute (Instituto Nacional de Radioterapia; INR), taking its final name on May 19.

Due to the insufficient size of its original location in the 1980s, efforts were made by then director Eduardo Cáceres Graziani and the Peruvian Cancer Foundation, which concluded with the donation of a terrain at the intersection of Angamos and Aviación avenues. The limited budget made it necessary to request funds from the government, which was approved by then president Fernando Belaúnde. A volunteer programme to treat cancer patients was established in 1987.

The hospital has a chapel. A new building, called the Tower of Hope (Torre de la Esperanza) was announced in 2016, and projected to conclude in 2019. Due to the COVID-19 pandemic in Peru, the building was inaugurated in 2021.

== Organisation ==
The institute operates three regional headquarters (IREN) in the country:

- The Northern Regional Institute of Neoplastic Diseases is located in Trujillo, Peru.
- The Central Regional Institute of Neoplastic Diseases is located in Arequipa
- The Southern Regional Institute of Neoplastic Diseases is located in Concepción District, Concepción.

=== List of directors ===
The INEN is headed by a director-general.

- Constantino J. Carvallo (1939 – August 1945)
- Oscar Soto Ahanno (August 1945 – May 1952)
- Eduardo Cáceres Graziani (May 1952 – June 1985)
- Andrés Solidoro Santisteban (June 1985 – September 1985)
- Luis Pinillos Ashton (September 1985 – May 1988)
- Adolfo Puente Arnao Pezet (May 1988 – May 1989)
- Luís Salem Abugattas (June 1989 – November 1993)
- Rodrigo Travezán Carvo (November 1993 – January 2001)
- Edgar Amorín Kajatt (January 2001 – September 2001)
- Félix Cisneros Guerrero (September 2001 – January 2002)
- Carlos Vallejos Sologuren (January 2002 – July 2006)
- Carlos Vigil Rojas (August 2006 – February 2008)
- Carlos Vallejos Sologuren (February 2008 – January 2012)
- Gustavo Sarria Bardales (January 2012 – March 2012; interim)
- Tatiana Vidaurre Rojas (March 2012 – January 2017)
- Iván Chávez Passiuri (January 2017 – April 2018)
- Eduardo Payet Meza (April 2018 – August 2022)
- Francisco Berrospi Espinoza (August 2022 – present)

== See also ==
- Peruvian Cancer Foundation
- San Bartolomé National Hospital
