= Disability in Peru =

Peruvians with disabilities constitute 5.2% of the population. 52.1% of disabled people are women. 40.5% of disabled Peruvians have a primary or better education. 76.8% are not economically active they have an unemployment rate of 12.1%. Of those Peruvians with disabilities who do work, 58.3% are self-employed.

== Demographics ==
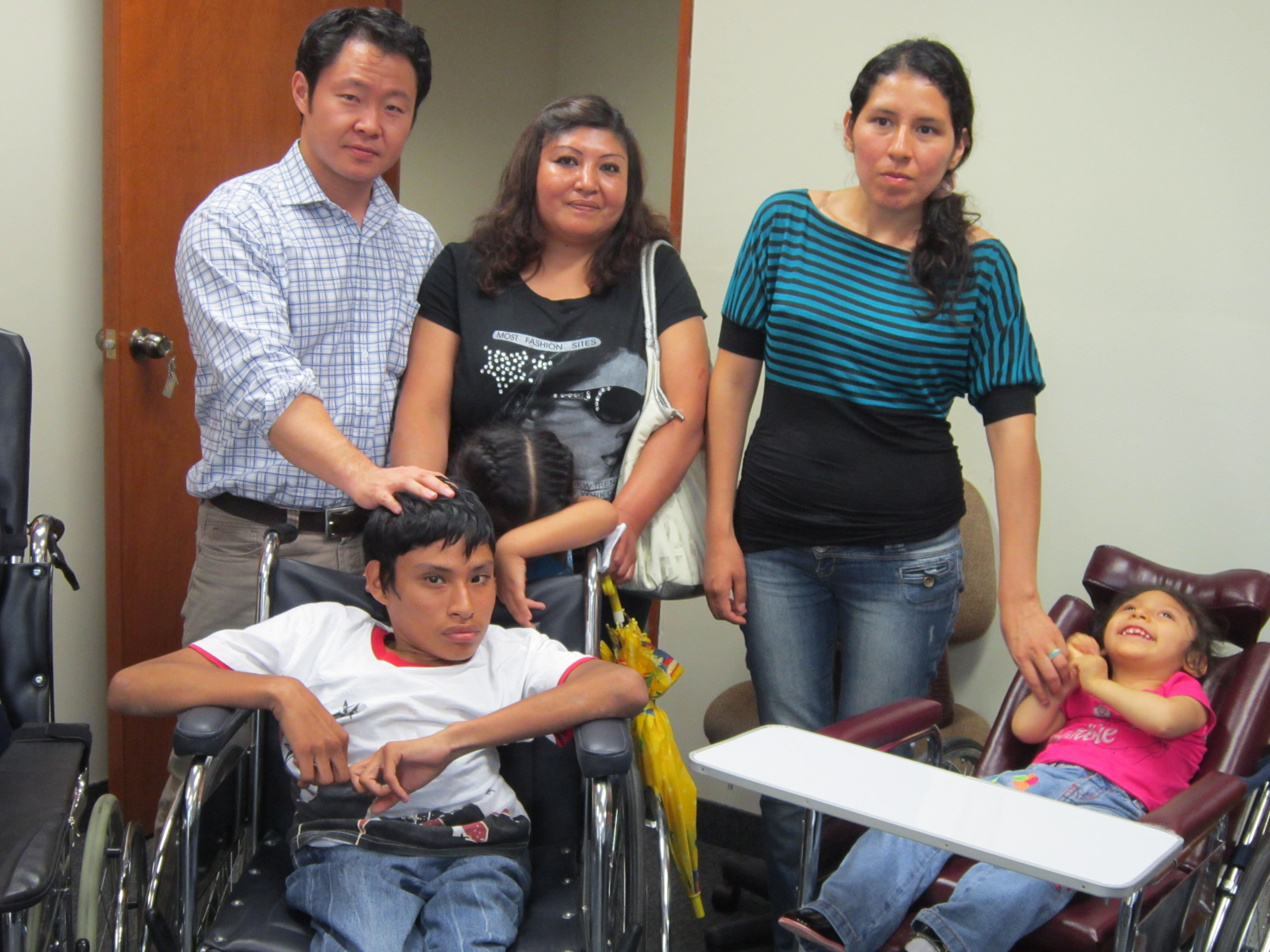
Congress member, Kenji Fujimori, donates wheelchairs to children with disabilities.

In 2012, the largest group of people with disabilities in Peru had were those with physical issues, such as an inability to walk or use their arms or legs and who made up 59.2% of all disabled Peruvians. The second largest group (50.9%) experienced some type of visual impairment. Around 88% of those with disabilities in Peru do not receive treatment or therapy for their disabilities. In addition, more than 81% of disabled people in Peru did not know there were organizations that were able to help them with their disability. As reported by The Guardian in 2016, Peru has one of the highest employment gaps for people with disabilities in the world.

In areas such as the Sacred Valley, 89% of children with disabilities do not attend school.

== Law and policy ==
Articles 7, 16 and 23 of the Constitution of Peru address disability. Article 7 states that individuals have the right to health protections and if they are unable to care for themselves, has rights for care, rehabilitation, security and respect. Articles 16 and 23 address the rights of disabled people to have access to education and employment respectively.

The general law that covers people with disabilities is Law No. 27050, created in 1998. This law established the National Council for the Integration of Persons with Disability (CONADIS). It also established hiring quotas for companies employing more than 50 people. CONADIS also helps disabled people find jobs by promoting them through their job board network. The Ministry of Labour and Promotion of Employment (MINTRA) helps young people find jobs. Despite quotas, some employers get around the law by counting people with glasses or frequent headaches as "disabled."

Law no. 29392, signed into law on September 9, 2009, by President Alan Garcia Perez, expands on Law No. 27050. The authority for applying the law is the Ministry of Women and Vulnerable Populations and it provides ways to sanction individuals and corporations who violate the law.

In 2004, Peru's Ministry of Health published "Guidelines for Action in Mental Health," moving towards better support for those with mental disabilities.

Between 2001 and October 2011, a policy of the National Registry of Identification and Civil Status (RENIEC) prevented people with mental and intellectual disabilities from obtaining national identity cards or if they were issued a card, it listed their disability on the ID. Because of this, around 23,000 disabled people were unable to vote, cash checks, distribute property to their children and faced other types of social discrimination.

=== Social security ===
Article 21 of the Constitution of Peru is concerned with who may be included in Social Security in coordination with CONADIS for disabled people.

== Politics ==
=== Advocacy ===
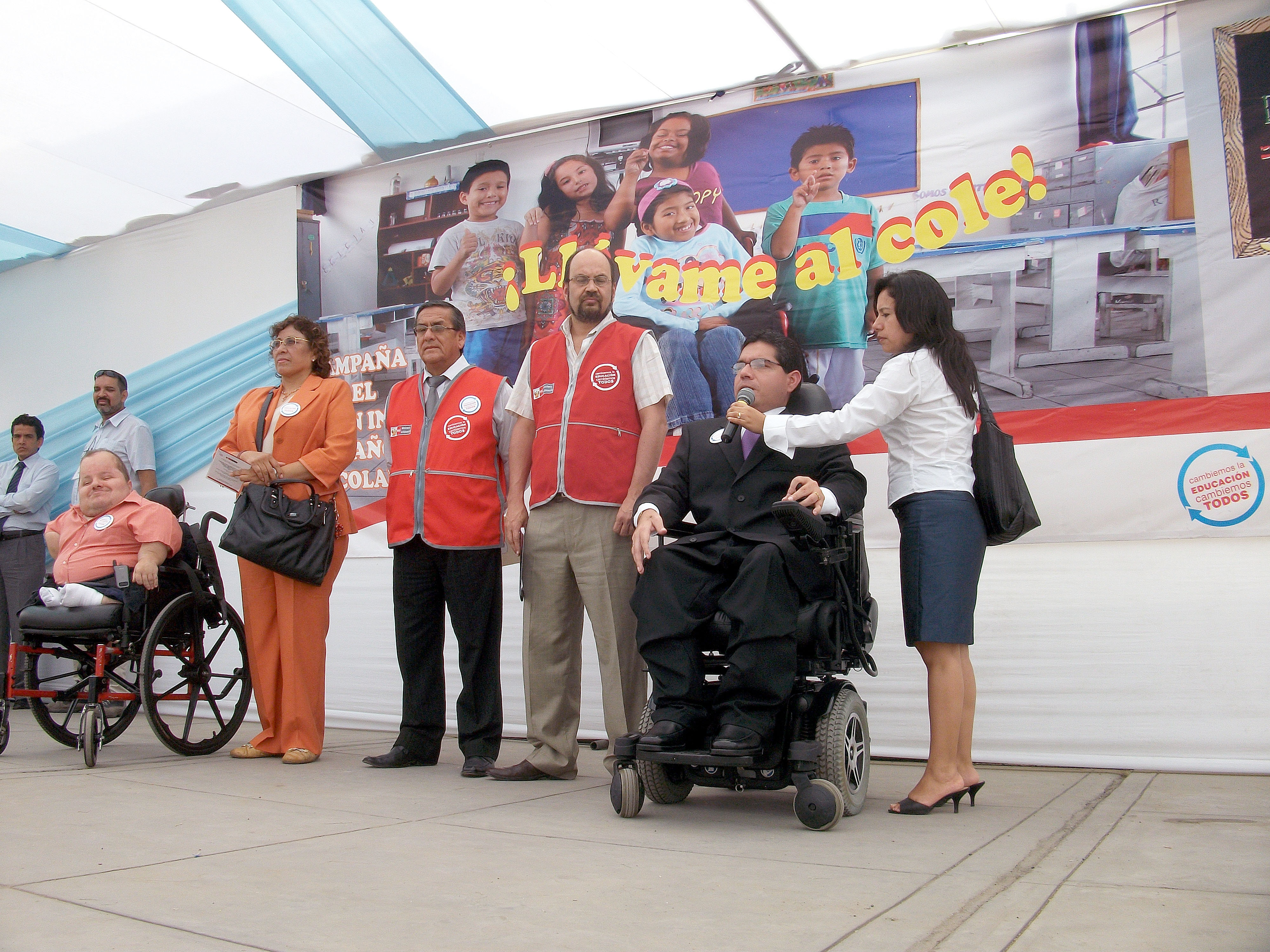
Third Congress Vice President Michael Urtecho and Congressmen Gian Carlo Vacchelli and John Reynaga participated in the launch of the school enrollment campaign for children, adolescents and young people with some form of disability.

A new program to help low income women and people with disabilities in Peru obtain technology-related jobs was initiated in 2017. The program created an online platform where employers could identify job candidates.

Mental Disability Rights International in 2004 found that human rights abuses were taking place in mental institutions in Peru.

In areas of Peru where people are living in poverty, individuals with intellectual disabilities have less access to education.

== Sport ==
Peru made its Paralympic Games début at the 1972 Summer Paralympics in Heidelberg, with a single representative to compete in swimming. It sent two competitors to the 1976 Games, then was absent for two decades, before returning in 1996 with a three-man delegation. It has participated in every subsequent edition of the Summer Paralympics, but has never taken part in the Winter Paralympics.

== See also ==
- Centro Ann Sullivan del Perú
