= The Wild Goose Lake =

2019 film

- Theatrical release poster
- Traditional Chinese: 南方車站的聚會
- Simplified Chinese: 南方车站的聚会
- Hanyu Pinyin: Nánfāng Chēzhàn de Jùhuì
- Jyutping: Naam^{4}fong^{1} ce^{1}zaam^{6} dik^{1} zeoi^{6}wui^{6}
- Directed by: Diao Yinan
- Written by: Diao Yinan
- Produced by: Li Li
- Starring: Hu Ge; Gwei Lun-mei; Liao Fan; Wan Qian
- Cinematography: Dong Jinsong
- Edited by: Kong Jinlei; Matthieu Laclau
- Music by: B6
- Production companies: Green Ray Films; Maisong Entertainment Investment
- Distributed by: Memento Films (France)
- Release dates: 18 May 2019 (Cannes Film Festival); 6 December 2019 (China); 25 December 2019 (France)
- Countries: China; France
- Language: Wuhan dialect
- Box office: US$31.1 million

The Wild Goose Lake (Chinese: 南方車站的聚會; pinyin: Nánfāng Chēzhàn de Jùhuì; lit. 'Meeting at South Train Station') is a 2019 Chinese neo-noir crime thriller film written and directed by Diao Yinan and starring Hu Ge, Gwei Lun-mei, Liao Fan, and Wan Qian. It garnered $31 million at the box office and was selected to compete for the Palme d'Or at the 2019 edition of Cannes Film Festival.

== Plot ==
The film opens with Zhou Zenong meeting with Liu Aiai at a train station. Zhou is expecting to meet with his wife, Shujun but Liu Aiai has been sent instead by Huahua an associate of Zhou's. Zhou recounts that he is the leader of a small gang who steals motorbikes. One of his subordinates, Red Hair, shot a rival in the leg during an argument about territory. The rival gang wanted revenge on Red Hair and Zhou and set a trap for them. Red Hair is killed by the trap, decapitating him, and Zhou is shot twice in the torso. While trying to escape in the rain, Zhou accidentally shoots and kills a policeman, mistaking him for a member of the rival gang.

Meanwhile, the police deduce he will hide at Wild Goose Lake; a lawless area of Wuhan, and set a dragnet there for him. The leader of the police is Captain Liu. The police have Shujun under surveillance.

Zhou had sought out Huahua, an associate he trusts, to get his wife Shujin so that they can leave together. Huahua is a pimp at Wild Goose Lake and Liu Aiai is one of his "bathing beauties" who service customers at the lake. Liu Aiai who is not known to the police is used as a middle person by Huahua.

The police offer a 300,000 yuan, dead or alive, reward for Zhou. When Zhou learns of the reward he wants Liu to arrange for his wife to turn him in so that his wife can collect the reward. Huahua is interested in collecting the reward for himself. Meanwhile the rival gang is also looking to collect the reward and kill Zhou in the process. Zhou is eventually trapped by the rival gang in an apartment and stabbed by the rival gang members who shot him earlier, however Zhou is able to kill them and escape. The police hear the gunshots from the rival gang (who kill a passerby in the process) and start actively searching the streets for Zhou. Liu believes that Zhou suspects her of betraying him and tries to run away from him. In trying to escape Liu runs into Yan who recognizes her as one of Huahua's prostitutes. Yan forces Liu into having sex and Zhou saves her by killing him.

Zhou and Liu Aiai walk to the noodle shop and she orders two bowls of noodles. While settling the bill with the noodle shop owner, the police arrive and trap Zhou in the shop. Zhou is able to shoot his way out but becomes cornered by the lake where he is shot several times before succumbing to his injuries.

Liu Aiai later collects the reward and is driven by the Captain Liu to the bank with the cash. While getting cigarettes the Captain sees her leave the bank with the money. He follows her and sees her meeting up with Zhou's wife Shujun.

== Cast ==
- Hu Ge as Zhou Zenong
- Gwei Lun-mei as Liu Aiai
- Liao Fan as Captain Liu
- Wan Qian as Yang Shujun
- Qi Dao as Hua Hua
- Huang Jue as Yan Ge
- Chloe Maayan as Ping Ping
- Zhang Yicong as Xiao Dongbei
- Chen Yongzhong as client

== Soundtrack ==
The ending theme song of The Wild Goose Lake is a cover of the Mandarin lyrical version of the famous Indonesian song, Bengawan Solo.

The Wild Goose Lake Soundtrack
Name	Mandarin	Singer	Length
Beautiful Solo River	美丽的梭罗河	Hu Ge	3:50

== Release ==
The film had its premiere at the 2019 Cannes Film Festival on 18 May 2019. It was released in China on 6 December 2019 and in France on 25 December 2019. Its release for Blu-ray and DVD sales took place on 7 July 2020.

== Reception ==
=== Box office ===
The Wild Goose Lake grossed $12,573 in the United States and Canada and $31 million in other territories.

=== Critical response ===
On review aggregator Rotten Tomatoes, the film holds an approval rating of 91% based on 80 reviews, with an average rating of 7.5/10. The website's critical consensus reads, "Smart and stylish, The Wild Goose Lake blends B-movie thrills with bold filmmaking choices and thought-provoking social commentary." On Metacritic, the film has a weighted average score of 76 out of 100, based on 17 critic reviews, indicating "generally favorable reviews".

Glenn Kenny of the New York Times praises The Wild Goose Lake, writing that, "This movie doesn’t recycle film noir conventions so much as contrive — with a genuine sense of discovery" and applauds Diao's directing skill, stating "Diao can rev up the octane in chase and action sequences, but the movie almost always stays grounded in the physically plausible."
