= Marino Morikawa =

Peruvian-Japanese scientist

Marino Morikawa (born 1977) is a Peruvian-Japanese environmental scientist. He is known for environmental work in Peru.

== Early life and education ==
Born in Chancay in Peru, Morikawa has a master's degree in Interdisciplinary Biodiplomacy and a doctorate in Environmental Sciences from Tsukuba University in Japan.

== Career ==
His work became well-known when featured in a National Geographic news report. The report covered his work on the restoration of Lake El Cascajo in Chancay, Peru, his home town.

Morikawa also founded his own company, Nanoplus 7, which is dedicated to the decontamination of bodies of water. Morikawa has worked on up to 30 habitats around the world. Currently, Morikawa is working on the decontamination effort of Chira River in the Ecuadorian Andes, and lakes Titicaca, Huacachina and Alalay in Peru.

== Honors and awards ==
- In 2014, Morikawa's work was recognized by the Commission of Science, Innovation and Technology of the Congress of the Republic of Peru with the Medal of the Order of Merit Santiago Antúnez de Mayolo Gomero for Research in Technological Innovation.
- At the Seedstars World Lima event in Peru in 2016, Morikawa won with his air-cleaning drones.
- In 2019, Morikawa won the Esteban Campodónico Prize in the area of outstanding professional activity in service to Peruvian society.
- In 2019, Morikawa was awarded the "Nikkei Pride Prize — Social Action Merit Award" through the Kasuga Foundation.
- In 2019, the Carlos Ponce del Prado Prize for Conservation was awarded to Morikawa.
- In 2021, Morikawa won the Tumi USA Global Change Award.
