= Huacachina =

- Village
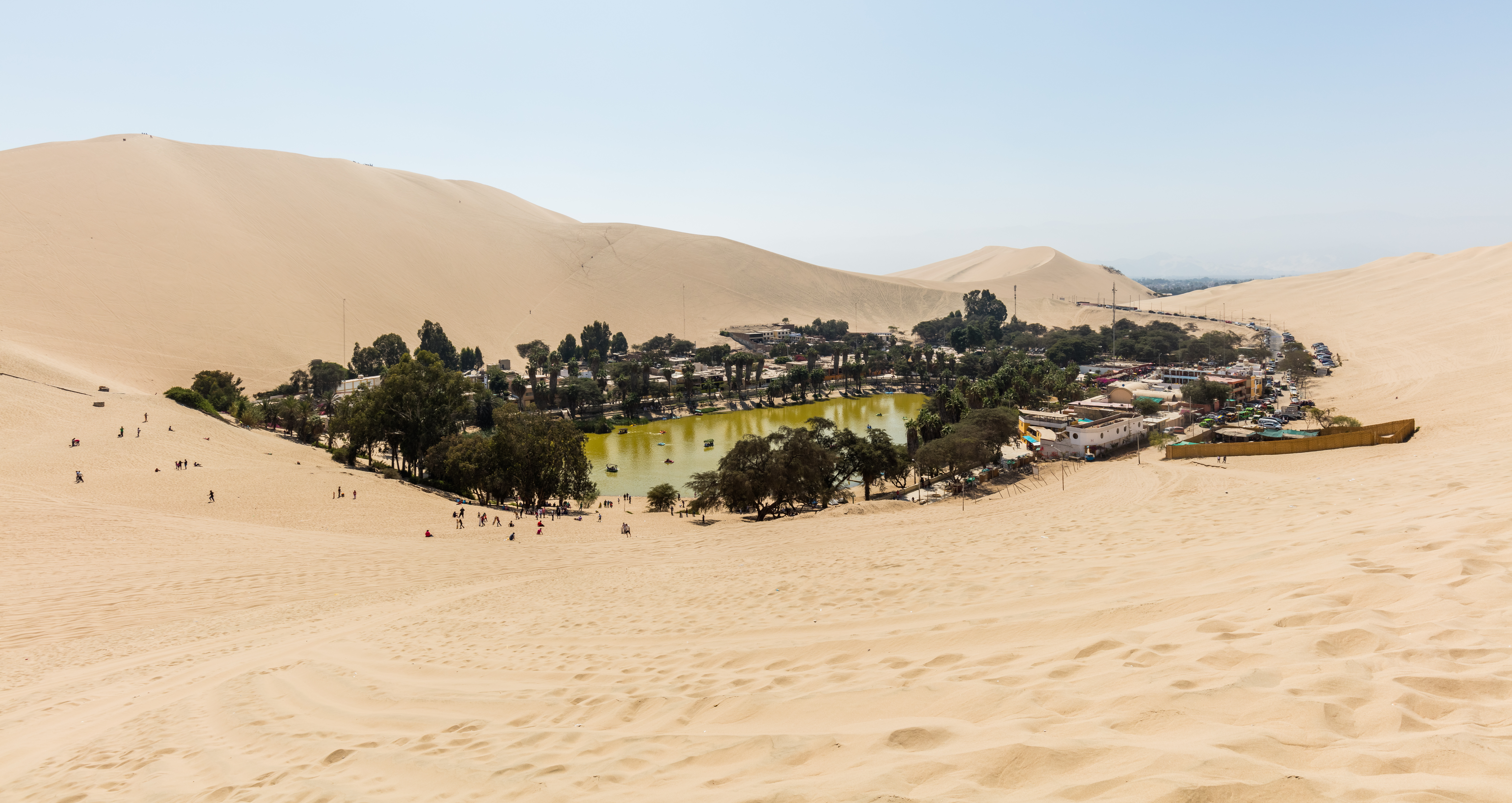
- Huacachina from a nearby sand dune
- Interactive map of Huacachina
- Coordinates: 14°5′15″S 75°45′48″W
- Country: Peru

Population
  - Total: 100

Huacachina is a village built in a small oasis about five kilometers from the city of Ica in southwestern Peru. The oasis was introduced as a feature on the back of the 50 nuevo sol note in 1991. Huacachina has a permanent population of around 100 people, although it hosts many tourists each year.

The name comes from Quechua: wakachina, lit. 'guard, conceal', possibly shortened from wakachina qucha lit. 'hidden lagoon'.

== Oasis and lake ==
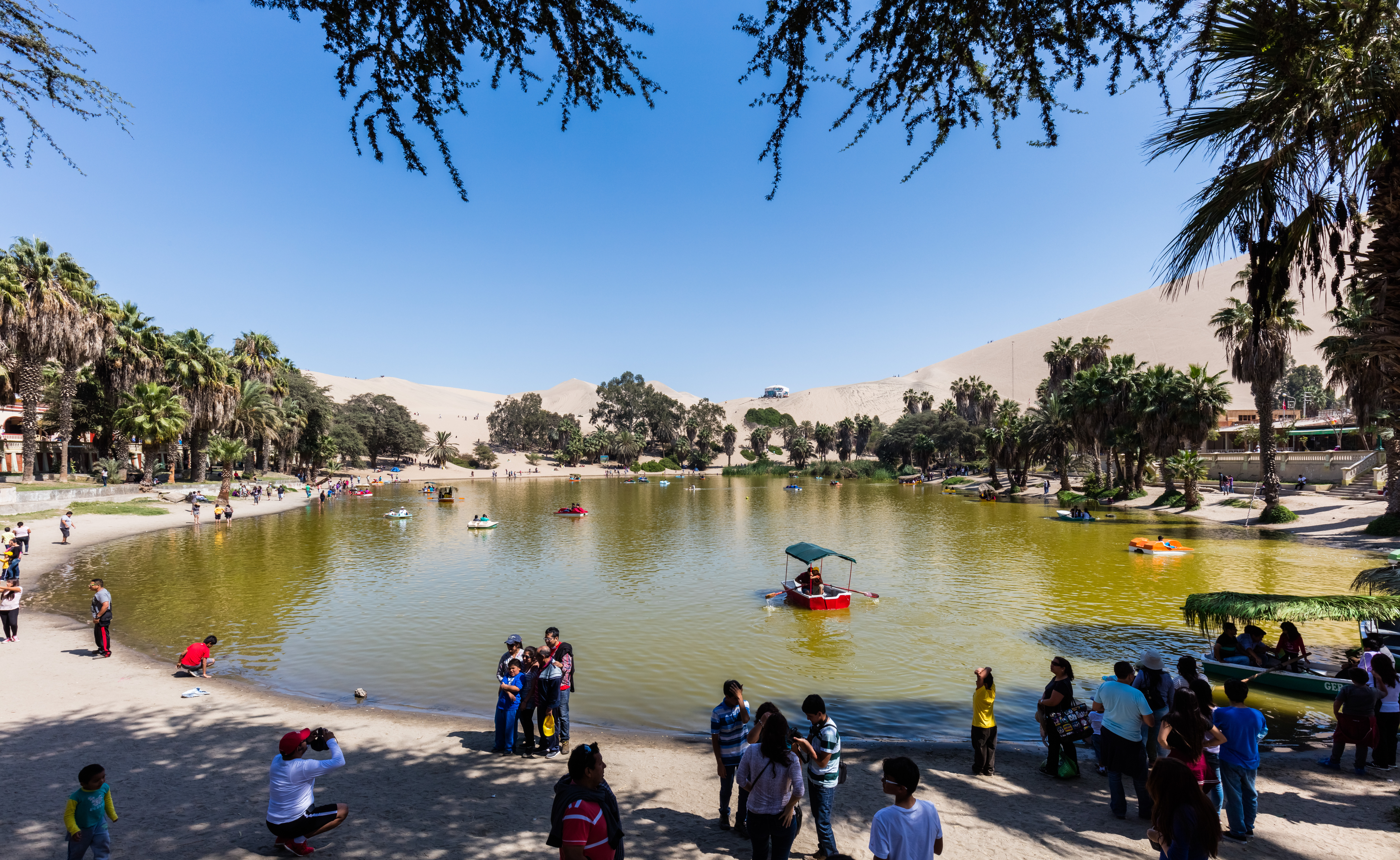
The lagoon at the oasis

Huacachina is built around a small natural desert lake, commonly referred to as the "oasis of America". According to local legends, the water and mud of the area are therapeutic. Both locals and tourists often bathe in the waters or cover themselves with the mud in an attempt to cure ailments such as arthritis, rheumatism, asthma, and bronchitis.

Legend holds that the lagoon was created by a beautiful native princess, she removed her clothes to bathe, but after looking in a mirror she saw a male hunter approaching her from behind, startled at the intrusion, she fled the area, leaving behind her mirror, which turned into a lake. Other versions hold that she fled, leaving the pool of water she had been bathing in to become the lagoon. The folds of her mantle, streaming behind her as she ran, became the surrounding sand dunes. The woman herself is rumoured to still live in the oasis as a mermaid.

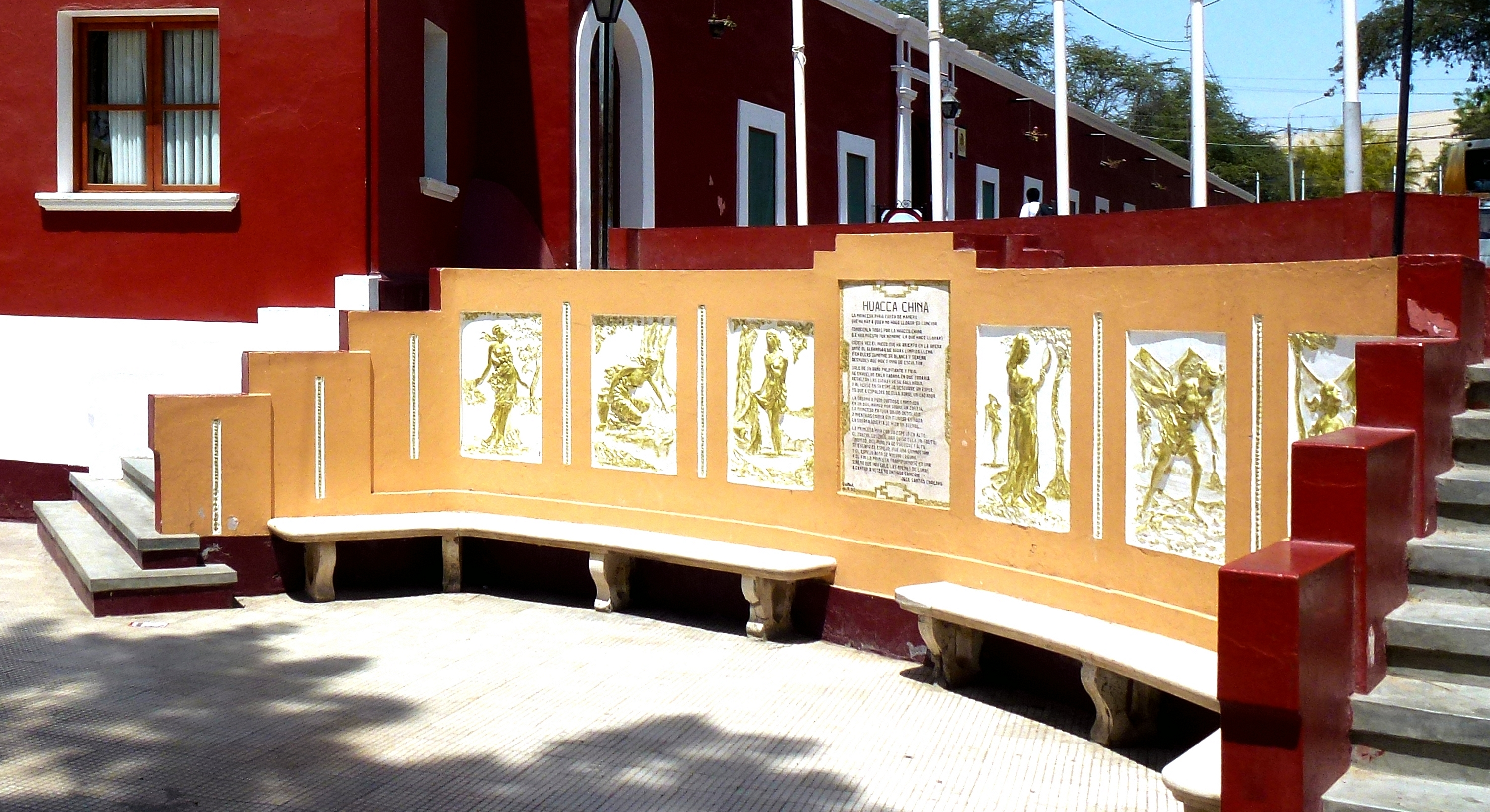
Relief in homage Huacachina's Legend

The lake was created by natural seepage from underground aquifers, but the increase in well-drilling started to threaten that supply in the early 2000s. To compensate for the loss, and preserve the oasis as a destination for tourists, local business groups began pumping water into the lake in 2015.

It was announced in 2016 that the Peruvian scientist Marino Morikawa, who created a nanobubble system to decontaminate lake El Cascajo, would lead a project to restore the Huacachina lagoon. As of 2020, no further news of the proposal has been forthcoming.

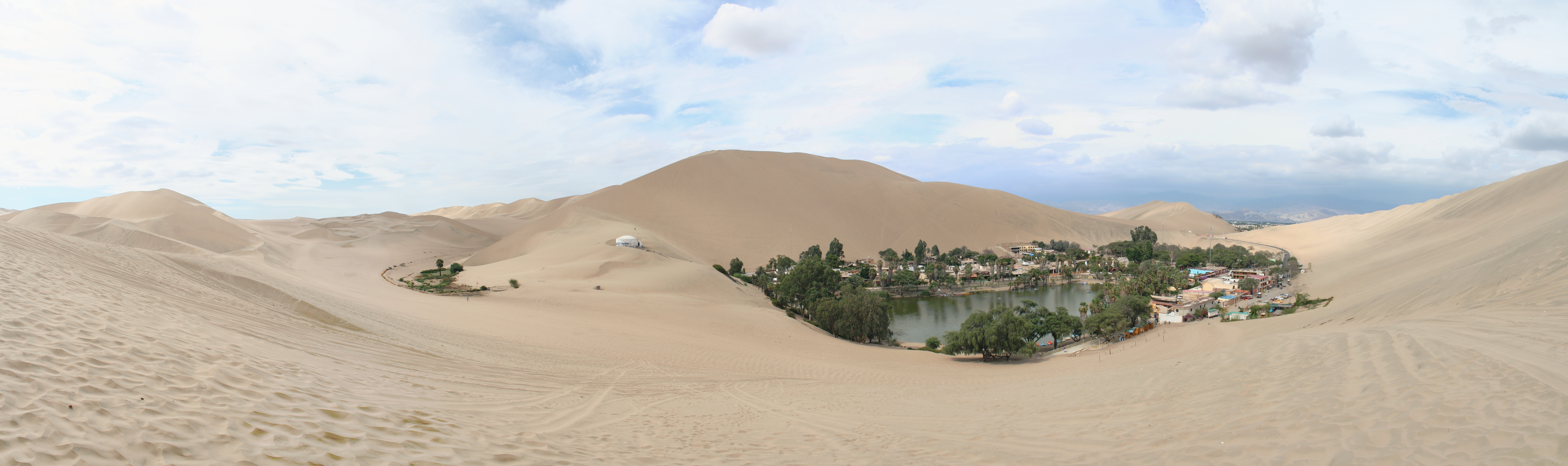
Huacachina and surrounding dunes

== Activities ==
Huacachina is a resort geared to local families from the nearby city of Ica, but is increasingly an attraction for tourists drawn by the sports of sandboarding on the sand dunes that reach heights of up to 500 metres (1,600 ft). Another popular activity is dune buggy rides on vehicles known locally as areneros. Huacachina has been a favourite family destination for decades, and in the 60s was a popular summer resort for tourists around the world.
