= Peruvian Cancer Foundation =

Peruvian charity

- Peruvian Cancer Foundation
- Formation: November 22, 1960
- Founder: Frieda Heller and Eduardo Cáceres Graziani
- Type: Non-Profit
- Headquarters: Av Primavera 939 of 402 B San Borja, Peru
- Website: fpc.pe

Peruvian Cancer Foundation is a Peruvian cancer charity founded on November 22, 1960. It carries out different activities in the fields of education, prevention, research, diagnosis and social support.

== History ==
The Peruvian Cancer Foundation was founded on November 22, 1960, by Frieda Heller and Eduardo Cáceres Graziani. They also run a hostel called Frieda Heller Hostel, where the majority of the collected donations go to.

In 2013, the prisoners of the infamous Castro Castro Penitentiary donated money and handmade gifts, which was made into a two-minute film and raised awareness for the foundation to collect more donations.

In 2014, their TV commercials won several awards, including Cannes Lions, El Sole, Clio Awards and The EACA Care Awards.

In September 2018, the workers of Petorperu made a donation of S/ 90,970.00 (equivalent of US$25,000).

In October 2023, the organization was awarded the Esteban Campodónico Prize for services to Peruvian society.

== Governing bodies ==
The organisation's boards of governors are the Board of Patrons, the Board of Directors and the General Management. The Peruvian Cancer Foundation is also supervised by an agency of the Peruvian Ministry of Justice of Peru called the Supervisory.
