= Uniform (film) =

- DVD cover
- Traditional Chinese: 制服
- Simplified Chinese: 制服
- Hanyu Pinyin: Zhìfú
- Directed by: Diao Yi'nan
- Written by: Diao Yi'nan
- Produced by: Li Kit Min; Iku Ishikawa
- Starring: Liang Hongli; Zeng Shuoqiong
- Cinematography: Dong Jingsong
- Edited by: Chow Keung
- Music by: Wan Zi
- Distributed by: Hu Tong Communications
- Release date: September 30, 2003 (Vancouver)
- Running time: 94 minutes
- Language: Mandarin

Uniform is the 2003 feature film debut of director Diao Yi'nan, who had previously worked as an established screenwriter for directors such as Zhang Yang and Shi Runjiu. The film, produced by Hu Tong Communications, was distributed via DVD in the United States by First Run Features as part of the Global Film Initiative.

Uniform follows a young man, Wang Xiaojian, who, down on his luck, comes upon a seemingly abandoned policeman's uniform. Putting it on, Wang discovers he can have influence and control not only on others but himself as well.

The film premiered at the 2003 Vancouver International Film Festival where it won the Dragons and Tigers award. It also screened at a handful of other international film festivals, notably Rotterdam, where it was the only Chinese film in competition for the Tiger Award.

== Production ==
Uniform was filmed primarily in Diao's home province of Shaanxi on digital video and on a shoe-string budget in September 2002. The film is Diao's first behind the camera, he had previously worked with the Beijing independent production house, Imar Film Company as a screenwriter, and as an occasional actor, most notably with Yu Lik-wai in the film All Tomorrow's Parties.

Both Yu Lik-wai and director Jia Zhangke served as artistic advisers to Diao during Uniform's production. The film's crew also included several Jia and Yu collaborators, including editor Chow Keung (see e.g., Unknown Pleasures) and producer Li Kit Ming (see e.g., Xiao Wu).

== Plot ==
Wang Xiaojian (Liang Hongli) is a down-and-out slacker in a small town in China's industrial Shaanxi province. His father, a factory worker, has fallen ill, and prospects for both Xiaojian and his family look dim. Stuck working in his family's tailoring and laundry shop, one day, Xiaojian comes across the freshly laundered uniform of a police officer. Attempting to deliver it, he discovers that the police office who the uniform was intended had been injured and would not be back on the job for a few weeks. Wandering home, Xiaojian decides to try the uniform on.

Suddenly, Xiaojian's life begins to turn around as people mistake him for a police officer, a mistake he quickly capitalizes on. Using the uniform, Xiaojian begins stopping motorists and bus drivers in order to shake them down for bribes in order to pay for his father's medical expenses. Less noble, he uses the uniform to begin wooing a pretty clerk, Zheng Shasha (Zeng Xueqiong). As they begin seeing each other more regularly, however, it becomes clear that Xiaojian is not the only one living a double life.

== Reception ==
=== Awards and nominations ===
- 2003 Vancouver International Film Festival
  - Dragons And Tigers Award For Young Cinema
- 2004 International Film Festival Rotterdam
  - Amnesty International - DOEN Award - Special Mention
  - NETPAC Award - Special Mention
