= Liliana Mayo =

Peruvian psychologist

- Born: Yolanda Liliana Mayo Ortega; March 30, 1952 (age 74); Lima, Perú
- Education: Universidad Nacional Mayor de San Marcos; University of Kansas
- Occupation: Psychologist
- Employer: Centro Ann Sullivan del Perú

Liliana Mayo (born March 30, 1952) is a Peruvian psychologist and special education teacher.

== Biography ==
Liliana Mayo is the founder and general director of Centro Ann Sullivan del Perú, an organization that serves people with developmental disabilities and their families. She is a frequent key speaker on parent and sibling training, supported employment opportunities for people with developmental disabilities, inclusion and distance education. She is a professor of special education at the Pontificia Universidad Católica del Perú and Universidad Peruana Cayetano Heredia, and adjunct faculty member of the Applied Behavioral Science Department at the University of Kansas. She received her B.S. degree in psychology from the Universidad Nacional Mayor de San Marcos, and her M.A. and Ph.D. degrees in Human Development and Family Life from the University of Kansas.

== Recognition ==
In 1996, Mayo won the Esteban Campodónico Prize in the area of outstanding professional activity in service to Peruvian society.

In 2005, Mayo received an Ashoka Fellowship for her work in developing Centro Ann Sullivan del Perú's distance education program. Previous distinctions include ABA International's Dissemination of Behavior Analysis Award, a Distinguished Service Citation award from the University of Kansas, Spain's Queen Sofia Award for Rehabilitation and Integration and Rotary International's Paul P. Harris Award for Teamwork.

In 2007, she received the highest honor from the Government of Peru for a civilian's service, the Orden El Sol.

== Publications ==
- Mayo, Liliana (1986) Continuous Access of Reinforcers and Protective Equipment: Reducing aberrant behaviors of retarded and autistic children. Thesis Archives: Library of Congress, U.S.A.
- Schroeder, S.R., LeBlanc, J.M., & Mayo, Liliana (1996) A life span perspective on the development of individuals with autism. Journal of Autism and Developmental Disabilities.
- LeBlanc, J.M., Schroeder, S.R., Mayo, Liliana (1996) A Life Span Approach in the Education and Treatment of Persons with Autism. In Cohen, D. & Volkmar, F.R. (Eds). Handbook of Autism and Pervasive Developmental Disorders, Second Edition. New York: Wiley Publishing. U.S.A.
- Schroeder, S.R., LeBlanc, J.M., & Mayo, L. (1996) A life span perspective on the development of individuals with autism. Journal of Autism and Developmental Disabilities.
- Mayo L. (1996) Long term follow-up in parent training: A low cost alternative for parents in developing countries. Dissertation Archives: Library of Congress, U.S.A.
