= Diao Yinan =

Chinese director, screenwriter, and actor

- 刁亦男
- Born: 30 November 1969 (age 56); Xi'an, Shaanxi, China
- Education: Central Academy of Drama
- Occupations: Film director, Screenwriter
- Years active: 1992-Present
- Notable work: Black Coal, Thin Ice; The Wild Goose Lake; Night Train
- Style: Crime, Chinese Neo-noir
- Movement: Sixth Generation (See: Cinema of China)
- Awards: Dragons and Tigers Award; 2003 Uniform; Warsaw International Film Festival Grand Prix; 2007 Night Train

Diao Yinan (Chinese: 刁亦男; pinyin: Diāo Yìnán; born 1969 in Xi'an, Shaanxi) is a Chinese director, screenwriter and occasional actor. He won the Golden Bear for Best Film at the 2014 Berlin International Film Festival for the widely acclaimed Chinese neo-noir film Black Coal, Thin Ice. Diao is considered a member of the sixth generation of Chinese film makers whose subject matter is focused on realism and stories of urban crime.

== Biography ==
A graduate of the Central Academy of Drama in 1992, Diao has worked as a screenwriter with directors Shi Runjiu (in All the Way) and Zhang Yang (in Spicy Love Soup and Shower). Additionally, Diao has directed four films of his own, including 2003's Uniform and 2007's Night Train, which premiered in the Un Certain Regard competition at the Cannes Film Festival. Diao is a well known producer of neo noir films.

Diao most recently directed Wild Goose Lake (2019), which received its world premiere at Cannes. Wild Goose Lake tells the story of an ostracized gangster and a woman on the run, drawing on actual events (such as the "congress of the thieves", a summit of criminals that took place in Wuhan in 2012) and screened at the 57th New York Film Festival.

== Filmography ==
=== As screenwriter ===
| Year | English Title | Chinese Title | Director |
|---|---|---|---|
| 1997 | Spicy Love Soup | 爱情麻辣烫 | Zhang Yang |
| 1999 | Shower | 洗澡 | Zhang Yang |
| 2001 | All the Way | 走到底 | Shi Runjiu |
| 2003 | Uniform | 制服 | Diao Yinan |
| 2007 | Night Train | 夜行列车 | Diao Yinan |
| 2014 | Black Coal, Thin Ice | 白日焰火 | Diao Yinan |
| 2019 | The Wild Goose Lake | 南方车站的聚会 | Diao Yinan |

=== As director ===
| Year | English Title | Chinese Title | Notes |
|---|---|---|---|
| 2003 | Uniform | 制服 | Dragons & Tigers Award for Young Cinema at the 2003 Vancouver International Film Festival |
| 2007 | Night Train | 夜行列车 | Premiered in the Un certain regard competition at the 2007 Cannes Film Festival |
| 2014 | Black Coal, Thin Ice | 白日焰火 | Winner of the Golden Bear for Best Film at the 64th Berlin International Film Festival |
| 2019 | The Wild Goose Lake | 南方车站的聚会 | Was selected to compete for the Palme d'Or at the 2019 Cannes Film Festival. |

=== As actor ===
| Year | English Title | Chinese Title | Role | Director |
|---|---|---|---|---|
| 2003 | All Tomorrow's Parties | 明日天涯 | Xiao Zhuai | Nelson Yu Lik-wai |
