= Centro Ann Sullivan del Perú =

Disability organization in Peru

Coordinates: 12.08139°S 77.08132°W

- Founded: 1979
- Type: Special Education School, International Research & Training Center
- Purpose: Autism, Down syndrome & developmental disabilities
- Location: Lima, Peru
- Key people: Liliana Mayo; Judith M. LeBlanc
- Website: www.annsullivanperu.org

Centro Ann Sullivan del Perú (CASP) is a non-profit organization based in Lima, Peru that provides services to individuals with a wide range of developmental disabilities including autism and Down syndrome, as well as their families.

== History ==
Centro Ann Sullivan del Perú was founded in 1979 by Liliana Mayo and named after Helen Keller's teacher, Anne Sullivan. The Center follows the general guidelines of Applied behavior analysis through their own methodology, the Functional natural curriculum, which was developed along with consultant Judith M. LeBlanc. The center currently serves 400 students in its campus in the San Miguel District of Lima.

== Programs ==
Centro Ann Sullivan del Perú's student programs include early childhood intervention, preschool, school, vocational instruction, supported employment and inclusion. All programs put heavy emphasis on family training and participation, and include activities like school of parents, in-house training and sibling education.

The center also serves as an international research and training site for professionals. It currently has formal cooperation agreements and study-abroad programs with the University of Kansas and the University of Georgia. There are special education schools that have fully implemented its methodology in Brazil and Spain.

Since 1997, the center has conducted a program of distance education aimed at training professionals and families in rural areas of Peru through educational videos and teleconferencing.

== Philosophy ==
Centro Ann Sullivan del Perú refers to its students as "people with different abilities" instead of "disabled".

The center's goal for its students is not only to be integrated in schools and jobs, but to achieve a full integration into family and social activities, an "integration into life"

The educational approach of the center is based on their motto "Treat me like a Person".

== See also ==
- Disability in Peru
