= Cinema of Kazakhstan =

Cinema of Kazakhstan (KAZAKHWOOD)
- No. of screens: 213 (2014)
  - Per capita: 1.2 per 100,000 (2006)

Produced feature films (2009)
- Fictional: 12 (100%)
- Animated: -
- Documentary: -

Number of admissions (2013)
- Total: 10,900,000
  - Per capita: 0.64
- National films: 700,000 (6.4%)

Gross box office (2013)
- Total: $63.6 million

Cinema of Kazakhstan refers to the film industry based in Kazakhstan. Cinema in Kazakhstan can be traced back to the early 20th century. Today, Kazakhstan produces approximately fifteen full-length films each year.

== History ==
=== 1930s-1980s: the Soviet period ===
The film industry in Kazakhstan has its origins in the production of documentaries in Alma-Ata (now Almaty) in the 1930s, developed to use as instruments for Soviet propaganda. The first Kazakh feature film, Amangeldy (1939), about the leader of the 1916 revolution, Amankeldı İmanov, was however the work of Lenfilm in Leningrad. Filmmaking in Kazakhstan was given a boost by the dislocations caused by World War II, as the main Soviet film studios, Mosfilm and Lenfilm, were both evacuated to Alma-Ata, where they combined with the Alma-Ata Film Studios to produce the Central United Film Studio. As a result, the Central United Film Studio, which continued working in Alma-Ata until 1944, produced 80 percent of all Soviet domestic feature films made during the war. Much of the great Soviet director Sergei Eisenstein's two part epic Ivan the Terrible was filmed in the Kazakh SSR. One of the major Soviet film schools, the Gerasimov Institute of Cinematography (VGIK), was also temporarily relocated to Alma-Ata during the war. This film school became an alma-mater for the most notable Kazakh filmmakers of the 1980s, known as "the new wave". On January 6, 1961, the major Kazakh film company Alma-Ata Film Studios had its name changed to Kazakhfilm by the Ministry of the Culture of the Kazakh SSR.

In the post-war Soviet period, the major figure of Kazakh SSR's film industry was director Shaken Aimanov, in whose honor the Kazakhfilm film studios were renamed in 1984. Notable films of this period include a number of historical epics, such as the love tragic story Kyz-Zhibek (1970), and a trio of action films involving a secret agent, played by Asanali Ashimov, who uses all manner of derring-do to defeat the enemies of communism. The first in the trilogy, The End of the Ataman (1970), was set in 1921 and was directed by Shaken Aimanov. The second, The Trans-Siberian Express (1977), directed by Yeldar Orazbayev and set in 1927, featured a complicated plot involving the defeat of counter-revolutionaries planning to kill a Japanese businessman on a train bound for Moscow, on which our hero was masquerading as a cabaret manager. The third, The Manchurian Variant (1989), was set in 1945 Manchuria. The films, with their central hero played by a Kazakh actor, were, as well as entertainment, part of the efforts of the Soviet establishment to demonstrate that the Kazakh people fully supported communism.

=== Late 1980s-early 1990s: Kazakh New Wave ===
During the perestroika in the Soviet Union in the 1980s, a new wave of young Kazakh filmmakers emerged, ready to challenge the cinematic establishment. Released in 1988, The Needle provided a catalyst for this new movement in Kazakh film. The film, directed by Rashid Nugmanov, cast Viktor Tsoi as the central figure. Tsoi was the frontman of the popular Soviet rock group Kino, and considered by many to be a hero to the disaffected Soviet youth. Kino also composed the film's original soundtrack. Tsoi's character, Moro, returns to Alma-Ata to collect a debt from a lowly criminal, only to find out that his former girlfriend has become a drug addict. Another important founding work of the movement is Ermek Shinarbaev's 1989 film Revenge (Месть), which tackles on film for the first time the tragedies experienced by the Korean population in Kazakhstan and Central Asia.

=== 1990s-2000s: post-independence Kazakhstan ===
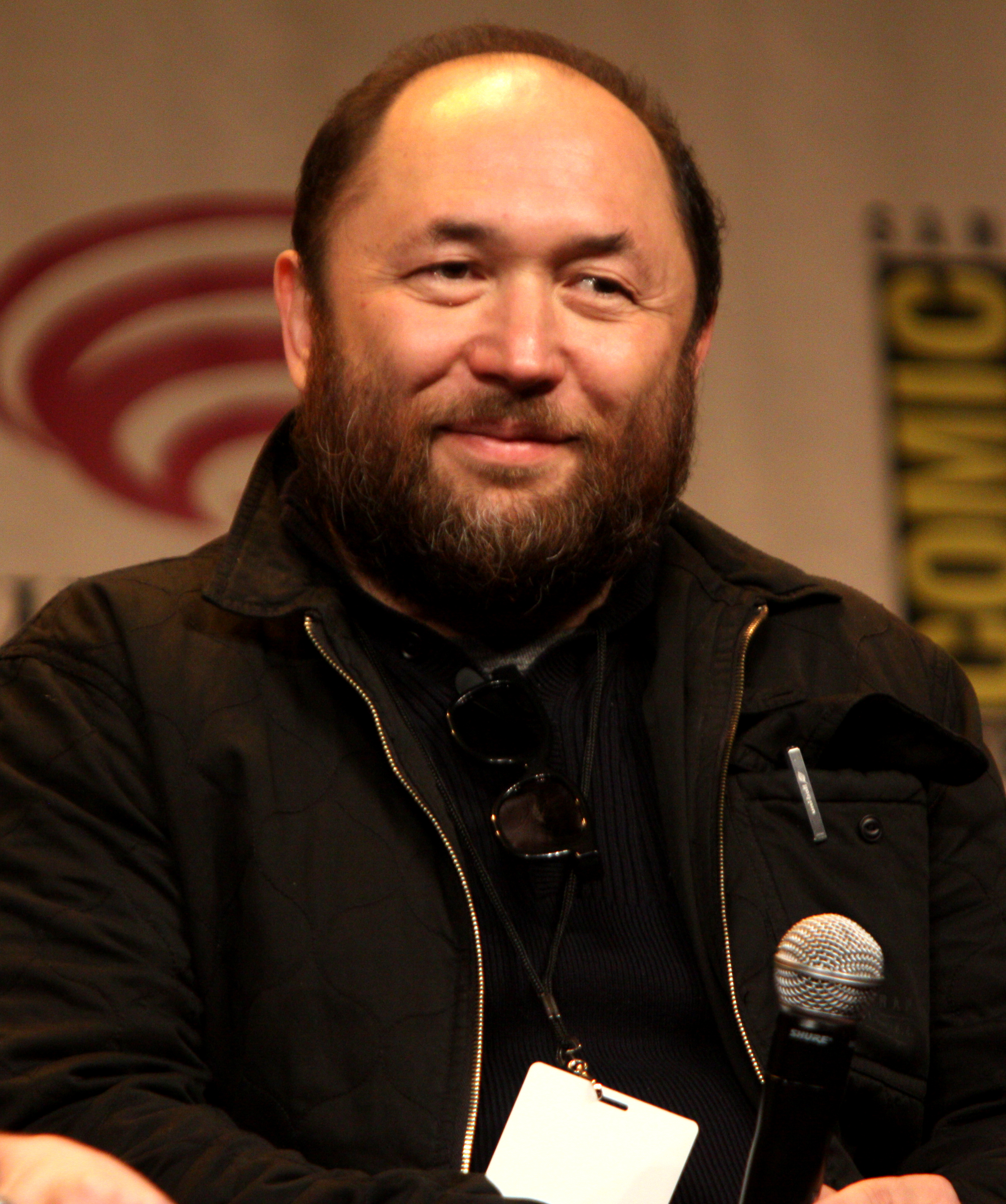
Timur Bekmambetov is the first Kazakh director who had success in Hollywood.

In 1993, Nugmanov directed The Wild East, loosely based on Akira Kurosawa's Seven Samurai, involves a group of dwarves, runaways from the circus, who brings the magnificent seven to protects them from the predations of motorbike-riding Mongolian hoodlums. Nugmanov moved to Paris in 1993, where he has been associated with Kazakh political opposition groups. Other filmmakers of the post-independence Kazakhstan to have achieved success at international festivals include Satybaldy Narimbetov. His Biography of a Young Accordion Player (1994) is a tale of a small boy growing up in a Kazakh village during World War II. Leila's Prayer (2002) focuses on girl from a village close to the Semipalatinsk nuclear test site, whose mother prayer is that her baby son should live to old age. Darezhan Omirbaev's Killer (1998), a Kazakh-French co-production, is a tragic tale highlighting the economic difficulties by Kazakhstanis in the 1990s. A young driver from Almaty causes a minor motor accident when taking his wife and newborn baby back home from the hospital. Unable to pay for the damage, he gets sucked into crime. Amir Karakulov has garnered critical praise for a number of films, including Homewrecker (1991), a tale of two brothers in love with the same girl. Again, it all ends badly. A newer arrival on the scene is Rustem Abdrashev. His directorial debut was Renaissance Island (2004), a tale of the first love of an aspiring poet set against the historical backdrop of the desiccation of the Aral Sea.

One problem is that very few of these films have been widely seen by audiences in Kazakhstan. Domestic distributors have preferred to rely a diet of dubbed Hollywood blockbusters and big-budget Russian movies, with the result that post-independence Kazakh cinema has developed something of a reputation a being more likely to be found in Western art houses and international competitions than on screens in Kazakhstan. However, the big-budget Kazakhstan film has arrived. Nomad: The Warriors (2005), with its international crew and cast, was an officially supported attempt to bring a film based on an exploits of Kazakh warriors of the 18th century onto international screens. Racketeer (2007), directed by Akan Satayev, about as a young Almaty in the tough economic climate of the 1990s, was billed as the first purely commercially oriented film made in the post-independence Kazakhstan, and proved a considerable box-office draw. One Kazakh director, Timur Bekmambetov, has also had success internationally in commercials cinema projects, particularly with the Russian fantasy features Night Watch (2004) and Day Watch (2006). Bekmambetov is now directing and producing movies in Hollywood. His notable works made in Hollywood includes Wanted (2008), The Darkest Hour (2011) and Abraham Lincoln: Vampire Hunter (2012).

A guerrilla filmmaking movement called Partisan Cinema (Partizanskoe kino) was initiated in the 2010s. Participating directors aim to work without any interference from the Kazakh government. The movement's manifesto has three pillars: no budget, social realism and finding new ways. Films and directors in the movement include:

- Toll Bar (Shlagbaum, 2015) by Zhassulan Poshanov
- The Plague at the Karatas Village (Chuma v aule Karatas, 2016) by Adilkhan Yerzhanov
- Witness of Case No 6 (Svidetel' dela No 6, 2016) by Serik Abishev

=== 2010s-present: contemporary Kazakhstan ===
Among the most prominent actors of modern day Kazakh cinema is Yerkebulan Daiyrov, who is in many films and won Best Asian Actor in 2021 at Cannes Film Festival for his role in Sunflower.

Kazakh director Marzhan Bekmaganbetova won an Honorary Mention at the 2021 Cannes Short Film Festival for the film “Maryam.”

In November 2021, Kazakh actor Tolepbergen Baissakalov won the Best Actor award for his role in the film titled “Fire” directed by Aizhan Kassymbek at the 2021 Asian World Film Festival.

== Cinemas ==
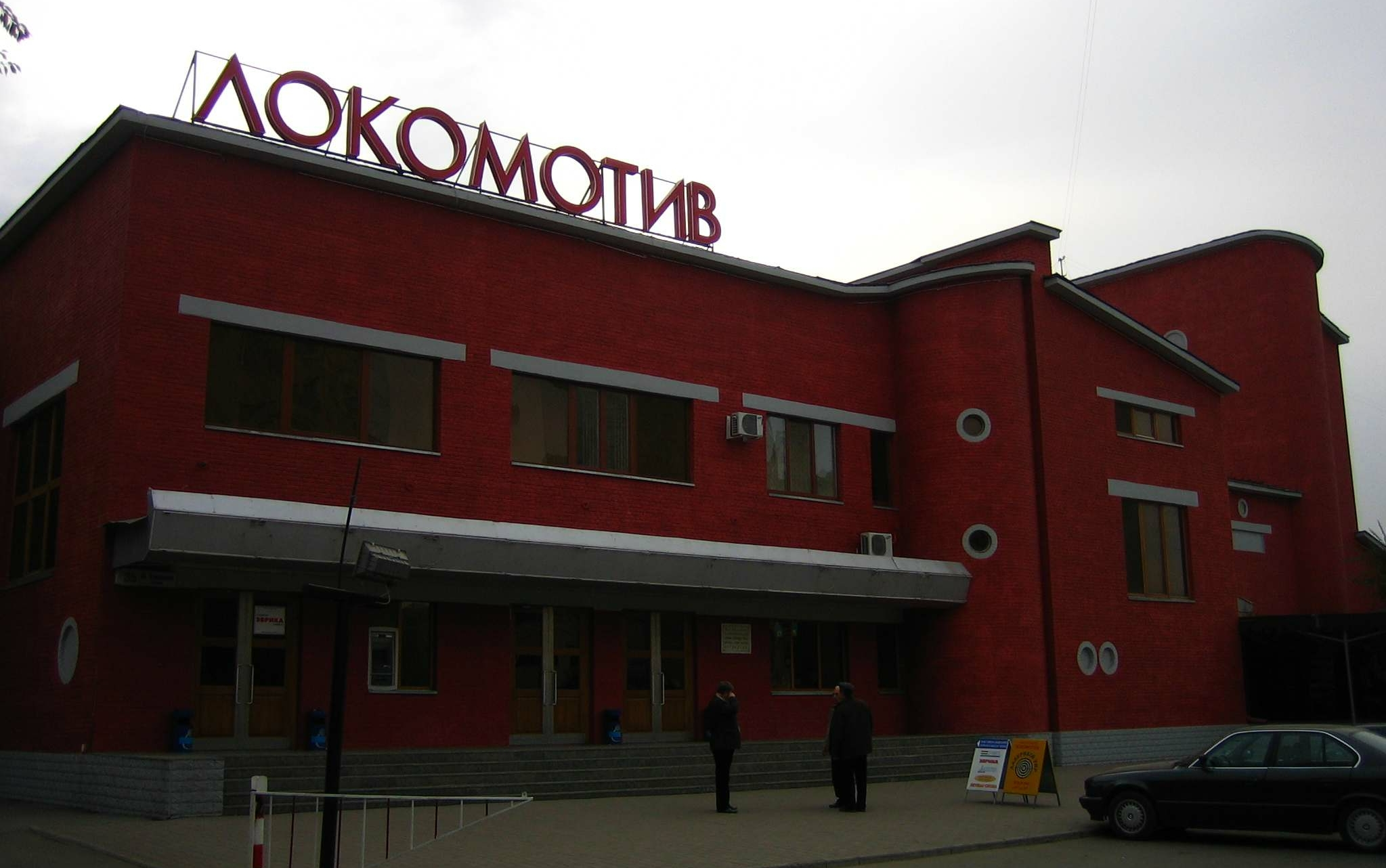
Lokomotiv Cinema in Aktobe was built in 1928 during the Soviet period.

Cinemas in Kazakhstan range from draughty Soviet survivals to modern multiplex complexes. The market of cinemas is divided between the KinoPark Multiplex Cinemas, StarCinema, Arman and smaller players. Kazakhstan's new cinemas are usually located in shopping malls and entertainment centers. Ticket prices are lower than those in Western Europe and North America. In 2012, IMAX Corp. opened those two cinemas in Kazakhstan, as the result of the deal signed with KinoPark Multiplex Cinemas in 2010. Films originally made in English are almost invariably dubbed, not subtitled, but there is a little shown in English.

== Festivals ==
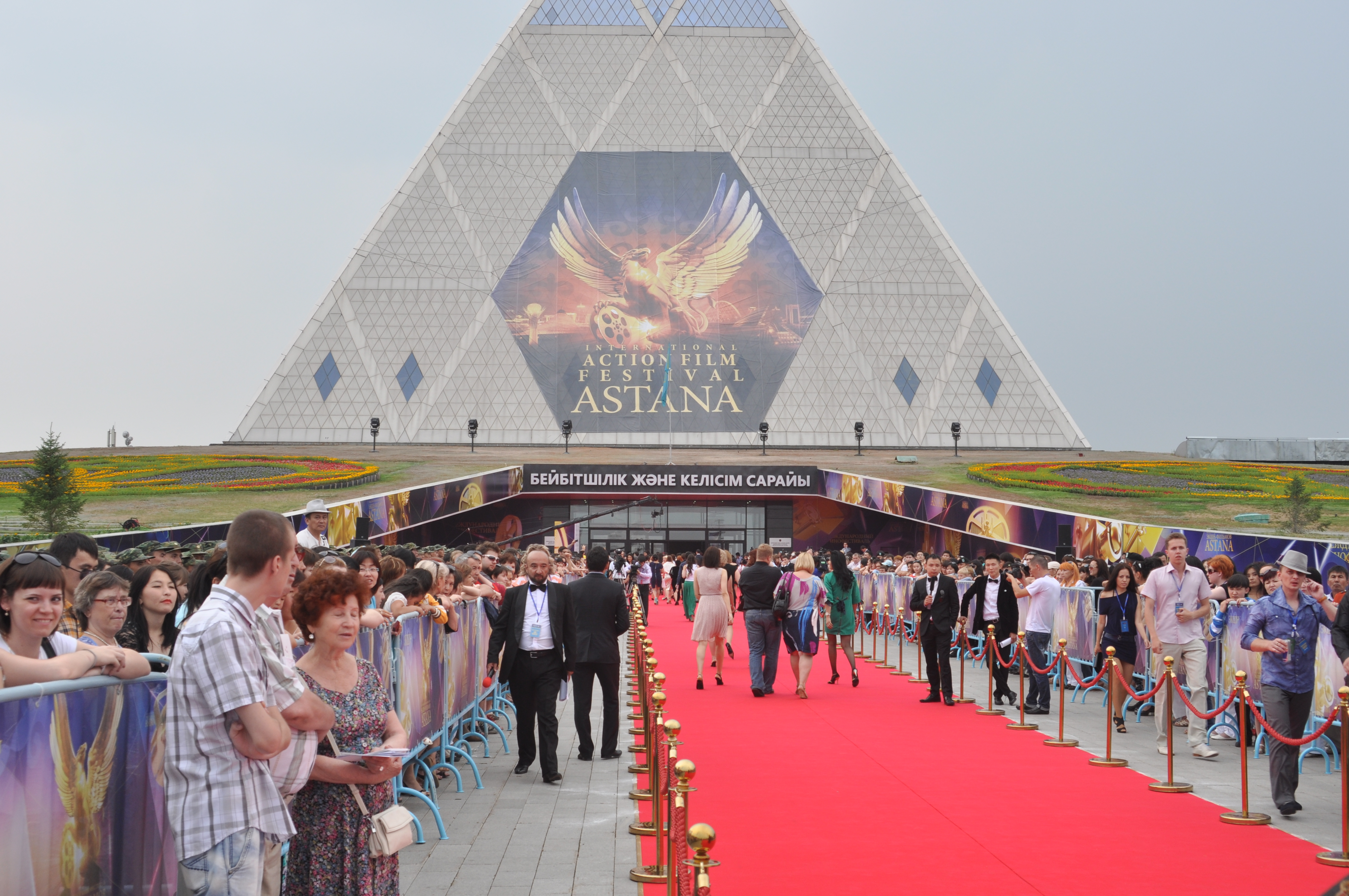
Red Carpet at the International Astana Action Film Festival in 2012.

- International Astana Action Film Festival
- Shaken's Stars
- Eurasia International Film Festival
- The Kazakhstan National Film Support State Center hosted the 2021 ShortAnimaDoc festival in November 2021. This film festival featured short feature, animated, and documentary films directed by Kazakh filmmakers.

== Film schools ==
- Kazakh National Academy of Arts
- Kazakh National University of Arts

== Film production ==
=== Film studios ===
Kazakhfilm Studio is a state-owned company, financed by the Ministry of Culture, which has been in Kazakhstan since Soviet Union times.

Eurasia Film Production is the leading private film production company in Kazakhstan. Film "Mongol," produced by Eurasia Film Production was nominated for the best foreign-language film Oscar in 2008, and in the same year “Tulpan” received the Grand Prix in Cannes’ Un Certain Regard.

Satai Film is another leading film production company in Almaty, launched and run by Akan Satayev, one of the top film directors in Kazakhstan, and president of Almaty Film Festival.

== See also ==
- World cinema
- History of cinema
- Cinema of the world
