= Amanat =

Amanat or Amaanat may refer to:

== Film ==
- Amanat (1955 film), a Bollywood film directed by Aravind Sen
- Amaanat (1977 film), an Indian Hindi-language film directed by Shatrujiit Paul
- Amanat (1981 film), a Pakistani film directed by Rangeela
- Amaanat (1994 film), an Indian Hindi-language action film directed by Raj N. Sippy
- Amanat (2016 film), a Kazakhstani drama film directed by Satybaldy Narymbetov
- Amanat (2022 film), a Russian film

== Television ==
- Amanat (Indian TV series), a 1997–2002 Indian soap opera television series that aired on Zee TV
- Amanat (2017 TV series), a Pakistani drama television series that aired on Urdu 1
- Amanat (2021 TV series), a Pakistani drama television series that aired on ARY Digital

== People ==
- Amanat Ali (disambiguation)
- Amanat (surname)

== Other uses ==
- Amanat (political party), the ruling party of Kazakhstan
- "Amanat" Commonwealth of Trade Unions, trade union federation in Kazakhstan
- Amanat River, a river in Jharkhand, India
- Partai Amanat Nasional, a political party in Indonesia
