= List of Kazakhstani submissions for the Academy Award for Best International Feature Film =

Best International Feature Film submissions from Kazakhstan

Highlights
- Debut: 1992
- Submissions: 20
- Nominations: 1
- Oscar winners: none

Kazakhstan has been submitting film for the Academy Award for Best International Feature Film (Note: The category was previously named the Academy Award for Best Foreign Language Film, but this was changed to the Academy Award for Best International Feature Film in April 2019, after the Academy deemed the word "Foreign" to be outdated.) category since 1992, following its independence from the Soviet Union.

As of 2026, Kazakhstan was nominated only once, for Mongol (2007). The country is so far the only in the Central Asian region to be nominated in the category.

== Submissions ==
The Academy of Motion Picture Arts and Sciences has invited the film industries of various countries to submit their best film for the Academy Award for Best International Feature Film since 1956.

Among the 24 films submitted by the Soviet Union, only one production was produced by a Kazakh film studio: The Ferocious One (1974). While Prisoner of the Mountains (1996), nominated representing Russia, was directed by Sergei Bodrov, and was a Kazakh co-production.

After its first submission in 1992, although the Kazakh film industry continued to produce a number of small, independent films that achieved success at international film festivals (including Killer, Shiza and Little Men), Kazakhstan did not submit any other films for consideration until 2006.

Kazakhstan's first three submissions were epic historical dramas, showcasing key moments in pre-Soviet Central Asian history. The Fall of Otrar (1991) and Mongol (2007) take place in the 13th century, while Nomad (2006) is set in the 17th century. The Fall of Otrar was produced by Kazakhfilm studio while Kazakhstan was still a part of the Soviet Union. Nomad, the most expensive film ever made in Kazakhstan, was bankrolled by the Kazakh government and told the story of the young Ablai Khan, who would eventually unite a number of Kazakh tribes on the steppes of 18th century Kazakhstan. Mongol is a biography of the famed Mongolian leader Genghis Khan, from his childhood as a slave until the beginning of his conquest of much of the known world.

Kelin (2009) and Ayka (2018) advanced to December shortlists, but were not nominated.

Below is a list of the films that have been submitted by Kazakhstan for review by the Academy, by year and the respective ceremony.

Year (Ceremony)	English title	Original title (Note: In October 2017, Kazakh President Nursultan Nazarbayev issued a decree to use Latin script, instead of Cyrillic script.)	Director	Result
1992 (65th)	The Fall of Otrar	Отырардың күйреуі	Ardak Amirkulov	Not nominated
2006 (79th)	Nomad	Көшпенділер	Sergei Bodrov, Talgat Temenov and Ivan Passer	Not nominated
2007 (80th)	Mongol	Моңғол	Sergei Bodrov	Nominated
2008 (81st)	Tulpan	Қызғалдақ	Sergey Dvortsevoy	Not nominated
2009 (82nd)	Kelin	Келін	Ermek Tursunov	Made shortlist
2010 (83rd)	Strayed	Заблудившийся	Akan Satayev	Not nominated
2011 (84th)	Returning to the 'A'	Возвращение в «А»	Egor Konchalovsky	Not nominated
2012 (85th)	Myn Bala	Жаужүрек мың бала	Akan Satayev	Not nominated
2013 (86th)	The Old Man	Шал	Ermek Tursunov	Not nominated
2015 (88th)	Stranger	Жат	Ermek Tursunov	Not nominated
2016 (89th)	Amanat	Аманат	Satybaldy Narymbetov	Not nominated
2017 (90th)	The Road to Mother	Анаға апарар жол	Akan Satayev	Not nominated
2018 (91st)	Ayka	Айка	Sergey Dvortsevoy	Made shortlist
2019 (92nd)	Kazakh Khanate – Golden Throne	қазақ хандығының алтын тесігі	Rustem Abdrashev	Not nominated
2020 (93rd)	The Crying Steppe	Ұлы дала зары	Marina Kunarova	Not nominated
2021 (94th)	Yellow Cat	Сары мысық	Adilkhan Yerzhanov	Not nominated
2022 (95th)	Life	Жизнь	Emir Baigazin	Not nominated
2024 (97th)	Bauryna Salu	Баурына салу	Askhat Kuchencherekov	Not nominated
2025 (98th)	Cadet	Кадет	Adilkhan Yerzhanov	Not on the final list
2026 (99th)	Abel	Әбіл	Elzat Eskendir	Pending

== See also ==
- List of Soviet submissions for the Academy Award for Best Foreign Language Film
- List of Russian submissions for the Academy Award for Best International Feature Film
