= The Voice Qazaqstan =

Kazakh television series

- Also known as: The Voice of Kazakhstan; Қазақстан Дауысы (Seasons 1–3); Голос Казахстана (Season 4); Qazaqstan дауысы (Seasons 5–6); The Voice Қазақстан (Season 7-present)
- Genre: Reality television
- Created by: John de Mol; Roel van Velzen
- Presented by: Azamat Satybaldy; Chingiz Kapin; Galym Kenshilik; Taukel Musilim; Jubanish Jeksenuly; Irina Ten; Turshinbek Kabatov
- Judges: Almas Kishkenbaev; Madina Saduakasova; Medeu Arynbaev; Nurlan Alban; Rustem Zacafraty; Ali Okapov; Eva Becher; Nurlan Abdullin; Zhanna Orynbasarova; Alem; Arapbayeva Marzhan; Saken Maigaziyev; Mayra Muhammad; Zhanar Dugalova; Kuandyk Rakhim; Tolegen Muhammedzhanov; Turar; Baigali Serkebayev; Bayan Alaguzova; Meirambek Besbaev; Bagym Mukhitdenova
- Country of origin: Kazakhstan
- Original languages: Kazakh (Seasons 1–3, 5–); Russian (Season 4, 7–)
- No. of seasons: 7

Production
- Producers: Talpa Media Group (2013-2017); ITV Studios (2021-present)
- Running time: 120 minutes

Original release
- Network: Qazaqstan TV
- Release: 27 October 2013 – 15 February 2015
- Network: Perviy Kanal Evraziya
- Release: 1 October 2016 – 13 January 2017
- Network: Qazaqstan TV
- Release: 4 September 2021 – 30 December 2023
- Network: Khabar Television
- Release: 12 October 2025 – present

Related
- The Voice (franchise)

The Voice of Kazakhstan (Kazakh: The Voicе Қазақстан, formerly Qazaqstan дауысы / Russian: Голос Казахстана) is the Kazakh format of the popular television series The Voice. It was created by the executive producer of Fear Factor, John De Mol. The first three seasons were broadcast on Qazaqstan TV in Kazakh language. However, due to the loss of the series to Channel One Eurasia, a subsidiary of Channel One Russia, Season 4 was broadcast in Russian. The judges of seasons 1-3 were Malina Saduaqsova, Almas Kishenbaev, Nurlan Alban and Medeu Arynbaev. They were all replaced in Season 4 by Ali Okapov, Eva Becher, Nurlan Abdullin and Zhanna Orynbasarova. The host of the series was Azamat Satybaldy.

The revival of the show was commissioned again by Qazaqstan TV . The fifth season was aired on September 4, 2021. The show was renewed for a sixth season which premiered on September 9, 2023.

In 2025, the showed moved to Khabar Television, and renamed as "The Voicе Қазақстан" starting with Season 7.

== Series overview ==
Warning: the following table presents a significant amount of different colors.

Season	Aired	Winner	Runner-up	Third place	Fourth place	Winning coach	Presenters	Coaches (chairs' order)				Network
Season	Aired	Winner	Runner-up	Third place	Fourth place	Winning coach	Presenters	1	2	3	4	Network
1	2013	Shaharizat Seidakhmet	Timur Omarov	Roza Mukataeva	Zhangali Abishev	Nurlan Alban	Azamat Satybaldy	Almas	Alban	Madina	Medeu	Qazaqstan TV
2	2014	Bauyrzhan Retbaev	Daniyar Ismailov	Indira Edilbayeva	Maksat Makulbekov	Almas Kishkenbayev	Azamat Satybaldy	Almas	Alban	Madina	Medeu	Qazaqstan TV
3	2015	Murat Xayrolda	Zhannat Adilkhanovna	Yerbol Tazhibayev	Diana Ismailova	Nurlan Alban	Azamat Satybaldy	Almas	Rustem	Madina	Alban	Qazaqstan TV
4	2016–2017	Dinmuhammed Dauletov	Alibek Almadiev	Orynbasar Abu	Kena Donya	Eva Becher	Chingiz Kapin	Ali	Abdullin	Zhanna	Eva	Perviy Kanal Evraziya
5	2021	Quralay Meyrambek	Erik Tulenov	Ernar Armandiq	Arujan Aydarbek	Saken Maigaziyev	G. Kenshilik, T. Musilim	Alem	Mayra	Saken	Marzhan	Qazaqstan TV
6	2023	Musa Marat	Azamat Torekhan	Narqyz Zhanuzakova	Mukhamedali Zhugunusov	Rakhym Kuandyk	J. Jeksenuly, Irina Ten	Zhanar	Kuandyk	Marzhan	Tolegen	Qazaqstan TV
7	2025	Nurai Mykty	Beksultan Kenishkaliyev	Dias Zhorabek	Dana Maksimova	Baigali Serkebayev	Turshinbek Kabatov	Turar	Baigali	Bagym & Bayan	Meirambek	Khabar Television

== Kids' Version ==
The Voice Qazaqstan
- Also known as: The Voice of Kazakhstan Kids
- Genre: Reality television
- Created by: John de Mol; Roel van Velzen
- Presented by: Chingiz Kapin (1); Galym Kenshilik (2–); Gulnur Orazymbetova (2–)
- Judges: Ali Okapov; Eva Becher; Zhanna Orynbasarova; Dastan Orazbekov; Arapbayeva Marzhan; Jubanish Jeksen; Zhanar Dugalova; Tolkyn Zabirova; Alem; Marhaba Sabi
- Country of origin: Kazakhstan
- Original languages: Russian, Kazakh
- No. of seasons: 3

Production
- Producers: Talpa Media Group (2017); ITV Studios (2022-present)
- Running time: 120 minutes

Original release
- Network: Perviy Kanal Evraziya
- Release: 2 February – 10 April 2017
- Network: Qazaqstan TV
- Release: 26 March 2022 – present

Related
- The Voice (franchise)

After the regular version was acquired by the Perviy Kanal Evraziya, it was announced to have a Kid's Version of the show, with the name "Голос Дети Kазахстана". The first had three judges, named Ali Okapov, Eva Becher and Zhanna Orynbasarova. It was won by Daniil Yun from team Ali. Participation is only for contestants between the ages of 8 and 14.

The revival of the series was announced by Qazaqstan TV, under the name "Qazaqstan дауысы. Балалар" after the airing of the fifth season of regular version. Contrary to the previous, this season will have four coaches named, Jubanish Jeksenuly, Dastan Orazbekov, Zhanar Dugalova and the regular version coach, Arapbayeva Marzhan.

Airing of the new season began on March 26, 2022.

Warning: the following table presents a significant amount of different colors.

Season	Aired	Winner	Other finalists			Winning coach	Hosts	Coaches (chairs' order)			
Season	Aired	Winner	Other finalists			Winning coach	Hosts	1	2	3	4
1	2017	Daniil Yun	Vladislav Pampurov	Dilnura Birzhanova	–	Ali Okapov	Chingiz Kapin	Ali	Zhanna	Eva	–
2	2022	Ersultan Omar	Azat Sündetbek	Ayzat Aydosulı	Şerxan Arıstan	Zhanar Dugalova	Galym Kenshilik, Gulnur Orazymbetova	Zhanar	Dastan	Marzhan	Jubanish
3	2023	Nurshat Kusanova	Jasmin Tuzelova	Nurislam Tilyeukhan	Moldir Bazarbay	Jubanish Jeksenuly	Galym Kenshilik, Gulnur Orazymbetova	Alem	Marhaba	Tolkyn	Jubanish
