= The Road to Mother =

2016 film

- Film poster
- Directed by: Akan Satayev
- Written by: Timur Zhaksylykov
- Produced by: Svetlana Korotenko; Anna Chakirtova; Aliya Mendygozhina
- Starring: Bolat Abdilmanov
- Cinematography: Khassan Kydyraliev
- Music by: Alim Zairov; Roman Vishnevskiy
- Production companies: Kazakhfilm, Sataifilm
- Release date: 29 September 2016 (Kazakhstan)
- Running time: 130 minutes
- Languages: Kazakh, Russian

The Road to Mother (Kazakh: Анаға апарар жол, Anaǵa aparar jol) is a 2016 Kazakhstani war drama film directed by Akan Satayev. It was selected as the Kazakhstani entry for the Best Foreign Language Film at the 90th Academy Awards, but it was not nominated.

== Plot ==
Ilyas, born in Kazakhstan in 1922, grows up during the period of Soviet domination. Separated from his home village, sent to fight during World War II, and afterwards consigned to a forced labor camp, Ilyas continually strives to return home to his mother.

== Cast ==
- Bolat Abdilmanov
- Berik Aitzhanov
- Adil Akhmetov as Ilias
- Aruzhan Jazilbekova as Umit
- Altynai Nogherbek
- Azamat Satybaldy as Khamit

== Production ==
Aliya Nazarbayeva, daughter of then-president Nursultan Nazarbayev, served as executive producer. The film was commissioned by Kazakstan's Ministry of Culture.

Filming took place in Kazakhstan, Belarus and Azerbaijan, with more than 2,000 cast and crew, 500 extras, 300 weapons, as well as professional stuntment and pyrotechnics used to film the Battle of the Dnieper near Minsk. The film's final scene was shot in Ushkonyr. The film was shot over a period of approximately four months.

Satayev stated that the film was inspired by a story he heard of a Kazakh mother waiting thirty years for her son to return home from war.

== Release ==
President Nazarbayev attended a private screening of the film on 1 March 2016 and praised the film's themes. The film's world premiere took place at the 38th Moscow International Film Festival. The film was released in Kazakhstan on 29 September 2016. In July 2018, World Wide Motion Pictures Corporation acquired the film's American distribution rights. The Road to Mother received a limited release in the United States on 24 May 2019 and was also made available to stream on Netflix.

== Reception ==
Sheri Linden at The Hollywood Reporter gave the film a mixed review, writing that "the two-dimensionality of most of the characters, however well played, limits the film’s dramatic impact", but praising the cinematography and concluding that "[h]owever overlong this Road may be, it manages to connect its proud contemporary glimpses of a cosmopolitan, multicultural nation with the suffering and losses of devastating past decades." Kimber Myers at the Los Angeles Times called the film "pedagogic and overlong in its approach to Kazakhstan’s past" but "effective in communicating the country’s history" and praised the cinematography for striking landscape shots and battle scenes.

Apart from its selection to represent Kazakhstan at the Academy Awards, as well as for the equivalent award at the Golden Globes, The Road to Mother was well-received on the international film festival circuit. It was awarded Best Foreign Film at the New York Eurasian Film Festival, Best Film at the Marco Polo International Film Festival in Croatia, and Best Feature Film at the WeLink International Film Festival hosted by the United Nations.

== See also ==
- List of submissions to the 90th Academy Awards for Best Foreign Language Film
- List of Kazakhstani submissions for the Academy Award for Best Foreign Language Film
