= The Needle (1988 film) =

- English theatrical release poster
- Directed by: Rashid Nugmanov
- Written by: Aleksandr Baranov; Bakhyt Kilibayev
- Starring: Viktor Tsoi; Marina Smirnova; Pyotr Mamonov; Aleksandr Bashirov
- Music by: Viktor Tsoi
- Production company: Kazakhfilm
- Release date: September 16, 1988
- Running time: 81 min.
- Country: Soviet Union
- Language: Russian

The Needle (Russian: Игла, romanized: Igla) is a 1988 Soviet thriller film. It stars rock musicians Viktor Tsoi (of Kino) and Pyotr Mamonov (of Zvuki Mu). The film premiered on 16 September 1988 in Almaty and in February 1989 in Moscow.

The Needle is known for being one of the first Kazakh new wave films, and was one of the most watched films in the Soviet Union in 1989.

== Plot ==
An enigmatic drifter known as Moro (who remains unnamed throughout the movie) arrives in Alma-Ata to extract a debt from a lowly criminal known as Spartak. He tracks down his ex-girlfriend, Dina, who lets him stay in her apartment. Meeting his debtor in a cafe called "Parliament", Moro learns that Spartak also owes money to a lot of other people. Later, he finds out that Dina's employer, the surgeon Artur Yusupovich, is supplying her with drugs and using her apartment to store morphine. In an attempt to help Dina, Moro takes her away to the Aral Sea (more specifically, to a location near the town of Aralsk), which they had visited together years before. The sea is by this time a barren wasteland. Moro conceals the ampules of morphine to which Dina is addicted, and after a few weeks in withdrawal she appears to be cured, but her habit returns when they return to the city. Almost desperate, Moro confronts the drug dealers, sees Spartak go into a state of hysteria, and turns Artur's people against him. The film ends as Moro is stabbed by one of Artur's thugs in a snowy street as he walks home to Dina. The ending is ambiguous, with Moro's ultimate fate unknown. As 'Gruppa Krovi' plays, the "aftermath" of several earlier scenes is shown in a montage.

== Main cast ==
- Viktor Tsoi as Moro
- Marina Smirnova as Dina
- Aleksandr Bashirov as Spartak
- Pyotr Mamonov as Artur Yusupovich
- Archimedes Iskakov as Archimedes

== Production ==
The film was commissioned by state-backed studio Kazakhfilm, following the political and social reforms of Perestroika. Nugmanov agreed to direct the film on the condition that he could choose the cast and edit the script at his will. Nugamov cast close friend Viktor Tsoi as the protagonist Moro, a character they had both been developing over their studies at the Gerasimov Institute of Cinematography in Moscow. Tsoi had previously played himself in the epilogue of 1987 crime film Assa. On directing The Needle, Nugamov said:

"I tried to free the film (scenes, dialogues, plot) as much as possible from any symbolism, to make it like an empty vessel that each viewer could fill with their own interpretation."

Principal photography took place across the Kazakh SSR. The ship that Moro and Dina find in the Aral Sea is a research vessel named Гидролог, or Hydrolog.

Tsoi was apparently dissatisfied with the rudeness of his character in the hospital scene. He objected to the phrase "Он тебя трахает?" ("He fucks you?") and suggested removing it.

The final scene where Moro was stabbed was filmed on a street named Tulebaev (Тулебаева) in Almaty. Nugmanov claimed in an interview on Closed Screening that Moro survived the final scene, claiming a series of films about Moro were being planned.

== Legacy ==
Alongside Assa in 1987, The Needle, released in the age of Perestroika, helped to bring Viktor Tsoi and Kino into mainstream popularity across the USSR, as well as attracting international attention. The band would go on to play before a crowd of 70,000 at a concert in Moscow's Luzhniki Stadium on 24 June 1990, shortly before Tsoi was killed in a car accident in Latvia.

The Needle helped to bring about the era of Kazakh new wave cinema, with films produced in Kazakhstan during this period including Nugamov's 1993 film The Wild East. Originally, this was planned to feature Tsoi again as Moro, with a Japanese studio offering to help fund the production, however Tsoi's death in 1990 forced Nugamov to heavily rewrite the script.

The site of the final scene along Tulebaev street in Almaty has become one of many memorials for Viktor Tsoi. In 2017, an avenue dedicated to the film was opened and metal plaques with lyrics from Tsoi's songs were laid on a stone-tiled walkway. A statue of Tsoi was later unveiled on the avenue on June 21, 2018.

=== The Needle: Remix (2010) ===
In 2009, Rashid Nugmanov began work a new edit of The Needle that expanded on the plot of the original, entitled The Needle: Remix (Russian: Игла: Ремикс, romanized: Igla: Remiks). This edit was released on 16 September 2010. According to Nugmanov this was done in part to acknowledge the 20th anniversary of Tsoi's passing and to also ensure that the film was available at the highest possible quality. The rough cut of the original film was over two hours long, but the unused footage had already been destroyed at Kazakhfilm. CGI studio Doping-Pong created new scenes starring Tsoi, as Nugmanov disliked the idea of filming the scenes with a stand-in actor. Nugmanov also convinced the former members of Kino to create new pieces of music for the film.

Unlike the original, where it is not clear whether Tsoi's character survived after being wounded at the end of the film, in the "Needle Remix" he is shown to survive. Of this change, Nugmanov commented:

[When making the original film] I set a condition for the studio: I will be free to handle the script, because non-professional actors will not be able to play it as written. In return, they gave me a condition: in the final, Moro dies unambiguously. And yet, Victor and I were not satisfied with such a finale, and we decided that, having been stabbed, Moro would rise from his knees and move on. Whether he survives or not is up to the audience. By the way, there is a hospital nearby, in which Moro could well have been pumped out. And if now I kill the hero in the remix, then I will indirectly come to terms with the fact that Tsoi is gone."

== See also ==
- A star called the Sun
- The Needle: Remix
