= Amanat (2016 film) =

2016 film

- Directed by: Satybaldy Narymbetov
- Written by: Satybaldy Narymbetov
- Starring: Berik Aitzhanov
- Production company: Kazakhfilm
- Release date: 19 May 2016
- Country: Kazakhstan
- Languages: Kazakh, Russian

Amanat (Kazakh: Аманат, Amanat) is a 2016 Kazakhstani drama film directed by Satybaldy Narymbetov. The film was selected as the Kazakhstani entry for the Best Foreign Language Film at the 89th Academy Awards but it was not nominated.

== Cast ==
- Berik Aitzhanov as Ermukhan

== See also ==
- List of submissions to the 89th Academy Awards for Best Foreign Language Film
- List of Kazakhstani submissions for the Academy Award for Best Foreign Language Film
