= Strayed =

Strayed can refer to:

- Cheryl Strayed, American author who adopted the surname Strayed before events depicted in her book Wild: From Lost to Found on the Pacific Crest Trail
- Strayed (2003 film), a 2003 French film directed by André Téchiné
- Strayed (2009 film), a 2009 Kazakhstani film directed by Akan Satayev
- "Strayed", a 2000 song by the band Smog
