= Tomiris (film) =

Historical film about Massagetae queen Tomyris

- Turkish film poster
- Directed by: Akan Satayev
- Produced by: Aliya Nazarbayeva; Svetlana Nam; Erkebulan Dayirov
- Starring: Almira Tursyn; Adil Akhmetov; Aizhan LighG; Erkebulan Dayirov
- Production companies: Kazakhfilm; Sataifilm
- Release date: 2019
- Running time: 195 minutes
- Country: Kazakhstan
- Languages: Kazakh; Russian
- Budget: US$6.5 million

Tomiris is a 2019 Kazakhstani feature film directed by Akan Satayev, which tells the story of the queen of the Massagetae, Tomyris, and the Persian king, Cyrus the Great. The film co-stars Almira Tursyn, Aizhan Lighg, and Ghassan Massoud.

The film was commissioned by the Ministry of Culture and Sports of Kazakhstan. The idea to create a film about Tomyris was brought by Aliya Nazarbayeva, the youngest daughter of the first president of Kazakhstan Nursultan Nazarbayev. She was later employed as a general producer of the film.

The premiere of the film took place in Astana, Kazakhstan on September 25, 2019. The film received mixed reviews from critics and, as of July 2020, grossed $1.3 million against a production budget of $6.5 million.

== Background ==
Tomyris was the queen of the Massagetae, people from a Scythian pastoral-nomadic confederation of Central Asia east of the Caspian Sea, in parts of modern-day Turkmenistan, Afghanistan, western Uzbekistan, and southern Kazakhstan. She reigned in the 6th century BC. Tomyris led her armies to defend against an attack by Cyrus the Great of the Achaemenid Empire, and, according to Herodotus, defeated and killed him in 530 BC.

Tomyris's archenemy Cyrus I was the founder of the Achaemenid Empire, the first Persian empire. Under his rule the empire embraced all the previous civilized states of the ancient Near East, expanded vastly and eventually conquered most of Western Asia and much of Central Asia. From the Mediterranean Sea and Hellespont in the west to the Indus River in the east, Cyrus created the largest empire the world had yet seen.

== Plot ==
The film is based on the story of Herodotus about the death of the Persian king Cyrus the Great during the war with the Massagetae, which was commanded by the queen Tomyris.

The story begins with a short biography of Tomyris's father, king Spargap, who is involved in the war between the clans of the Saka-Massagetae. His daughter, Tomyris, is born, but her mother, Bopay, dies in childbirth. Spargap raises his daughter and teaches her how to use a sword and ride a horse, as well as other nomadic skills. Tomyris also learns the hardships of camp life.

Sometime later, Kavaz and Kurtun agree to a compact with the neighboring Khwarazmians, whom Spargap has been raiding. After he ridicules them for their attempts, they assassinate him and kill the royal household, with only Tomyris surviving the massacre. She takes refuge in the forest and vows to avenge the death of her father. After several years she succeeds with her revenge, returns to her homeland where she is proclaimed a queen, and marries the son of a neighboring tribal chief, who is her ally.

Years later, Persian king Cyrus the Great tricks Tomyris's husband and one of her sons into his capital city, inviting them to discuss political issues that arose between his Achaemenid Empire and the Massagetae. Cyrus wanted to subdue the Massagetae and turn them into his vassals. Tomyris's husband and son are killed in Cyrus's palace by the latter's order. Tomyris learns this through her adopted son, who secretly followed the Massagetae to the Persian capital.

Persians offer the Massagetae a treaty of peace via the marriage of Cyrus to Tomyris. Tomyris turns down the offer, and warns Cyrus against any intrusion, but Cyrus marches towards Jaxartes at the head of his army. In the ensuing war the Massagetae defeat the Persians, inflicting heavy losses, with Cyrus also killed in the final battle.

== Cast ==
- Almira Tursyn – Tomiris
- Aizhan Lighg – Sardana
- Ghassan Massoud – Cyrus
- Berik Aitzhanov – Kurtun
- Adil Akhmetov – Argun
- Zarina Yeva - Tana
- Erkebulan Dayirov – Kharasp
- Azamat Satybaldy – Kavaz

== Production ==
The film was ordered by the Ministry of Culture and Sports of Kazakhstan. The idea of a film about Tomyris was brought to creation by Aliya Nazarbayeva, the daughter of the first president of Kazakhstan. Filming began in December 2017, and scenes were shot in different parts of Kazakhstan. The Massagetae heroes speak the ancient Turkic language, while the Persian heroes speak new Persian in the film, despite the fact that modern historians consider the Massagetae to have been a nomadic Iranian people. The film's budget was 6,5 million USD. The armour of the queen in the film based on the Saka "Golden man".

The plot of the film is built on the story of Herodotus, who called his version one of the many stories about the death of Cyrus the Great. The filmmakers took into account many features of the culture and life of the Massagetae, in particular, their pointed hats and tribal meetings, at which the most important issues were resolved. However, the language spoken by the Saka nomads, which is an artificially created proto-Turkic language, is controversial. The clothes worn by the Massagetae in the film are also disputable, as they are probably too heavy for the Central Asian region. The vicinity of the Amu Darya River has a very hot climate, so the summer clothes were lighter and of a different style.

Almira Tursyn, a psychologist, was chosen from 15 thousand people to play the role of Tomyris. She took professional lessons of horseriding and archery and learned to use swords and knives.

== Release and critical response ==
The film was theatrically released in Kazakhstan on October 1, 2019. The distribution rights of the film were sold to Blue Swan for Italy, SND Films for France, Art Mood for Spain, AT Entertainment for Japan, Gulf Film for the Middle East, Challan for South Korea, Paradise/MGN for CIS, Shaw for Singapore, Program 4 Media for Romania, Siyah Bayez Movies for Turkey, and Well Go USA for the United States. Distribution in the United States and Canada was picked up by Amazon Prime Video.

The film received mixed reviews, largely because Herodotus's version of events is not generally accepted by historians and researchers, and unlike in the film, Massagetae are Scythian people speaking an Iranian language, while in the movie all characters are speaking a Turkic language. Criticism came from both the Kazakh and Iranian public mainly for considering the film as a feminist approach to the history of both countries. The Iranian public also criticized the film for using Herodotus's description of King Cyrus's death.

Some observers believe that the film was aimed to make Dariga Nazarbayeva's potential presidential bid in the future, the daughter of Kazakhstan's former leader Nursultan Nazarbayev, more acceptable among ordinary Kazakhstanis.

The film won the Nouveau Genre Great Prize at France's 2020 L'Étrange Festival.

As of July 2020, it had grossed $1.3 million against a production budget of $6.5 million.
