= The Old Man (2012 film) =

2012 film

- Film poster
- Kazakh: Шал
- Directed by: Ermek Tursunov
- Written by: Ermek Tursunov
- Starring: Erbulat Toguzakov
- Production company: Kazakhfilm
- Release dates: October 2012 (Moscow Film Festival); 10 October 2012
- Running time: 102 minutes
- Country: Kazakhstan
- Languages: Kazakh, Russian

The Old Man (Kazakh: Шал, translit. Shal) is a 2012 Kazakhstani drama film written and directed by Ermek Tursunov. The film was selected as the Kazakhstani entry for the Best Foreign Language Film at the 86th Academy Awards, but it was not nominated.

== Cast ==
- Erbulat Toguzakov as Old Man

== See also ==
- List of submissions to the 86th Academy Awards for Best Foreign Language Film
- List of Kazakhstani submissions for the Academy Award for Best Foreign Language Film
