= List of submissions to the 82nd Academy Awards for Best Foreign Language Film =

2009 Best Foreign Language Film submissions
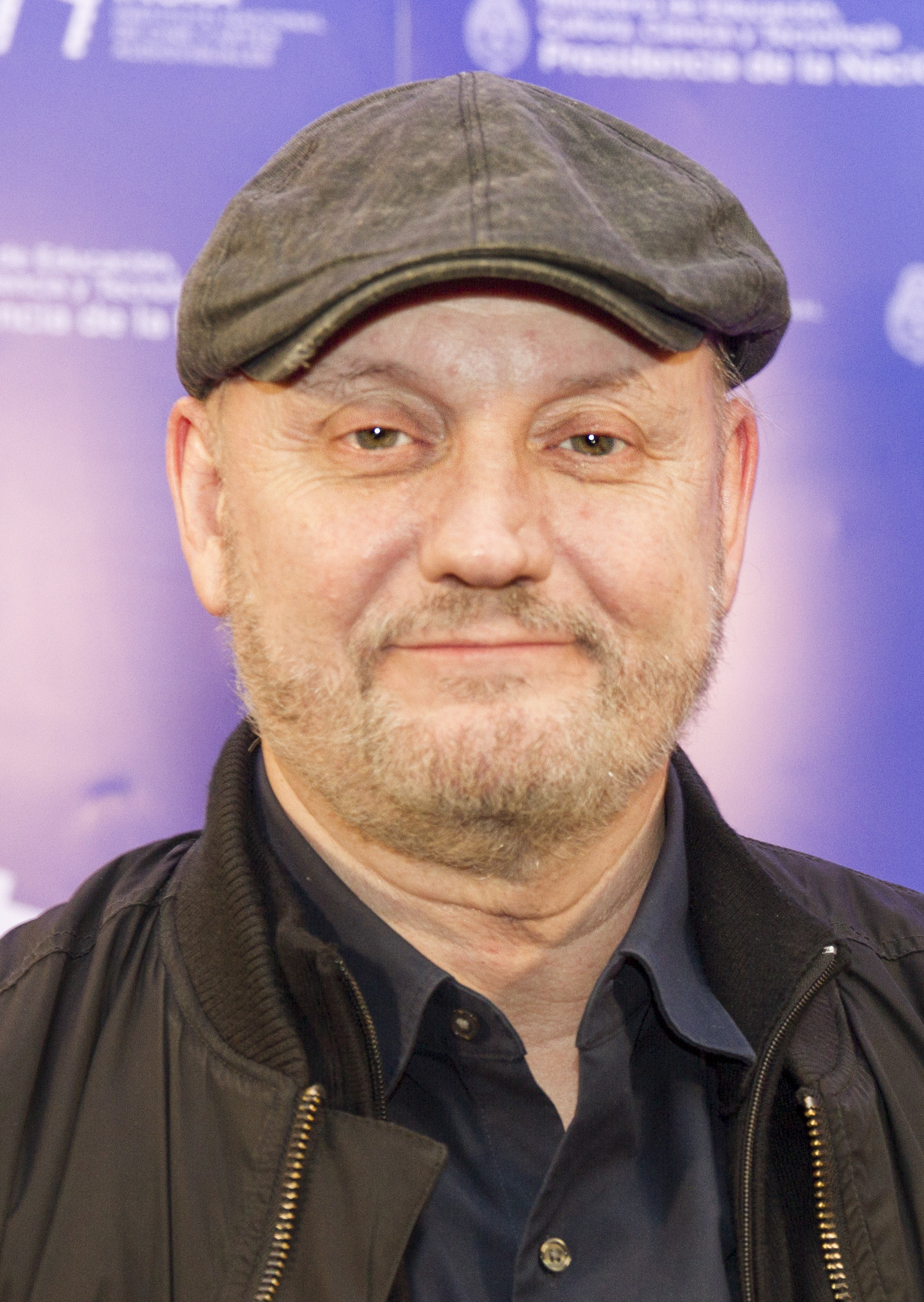
- Juan José Campanella directed A The Secret in Their Eyes, which won the year's award.

Highlights
- Oscar winner: (Argentina) The Secret in Their Eyes
- Submissions: 67
- Debuts: none
- Total eligible: 65

This is a list of submissions to the 82nd Academy Awards for the Best Foreign Language Film. The Academy of Motion Picture Arts and Sciences (AMPAS) has invited the film industries of various countries to submit their best film for the Academy Award for Best Foreign Language Film every year since the award was created in 1956. The award is presented annually by the Academy to a feature-length motion picture produced outside the United States that contains primarily non-English dialogue. The Foreign Language Film Award Committee oversees the process and reviews all the submitted films.

For the 82nd Academy Awards, the submitted motion pictures must have first been released theatrically in their respective countries between 1 October 2008 and 30 September 2009. The deadline for submissions to the Academy was 1 October 2009. 67 countries submitted films, and 65 were found to be eligible by AMPAS and screened for voters. After the 9-film shortlist was announced on 20 January 2010, the five nominees were announced on 2 February 2010.

Argentina won the award for the second time with The Secret in Their Eyes by Juan José Campanella.

== Submissions ==
Submitting country	Film title used in nomination	Original title	Language(s)	Director(s)	Result
Albania	Alive!	Gjallë!	Albanian	Artan Minarolli	Not nominated
Algeria	London River		English, French, Arabic	Rachid Bouchareb	Disqualified
Argentina	The Secret in Their Eyes	El secreto de sus ojos	Spanish	Juan José Campanella	Won Academy Award
Armenia	Autumn of the Magician	Հրաշագործի աշունը	Armenian, English, Italian, Russian	Ruben and Vahe Gevorkyants	Not nominated
Australia	Samson and Delilah		Warlpiri, English	Warwick Thornton	Made shortlist
Austria	For a Moment, Freedom	Ein Augenblick Freiheit	English, Persian, Turkish, Central Kurdish	Arash T. Riahi	Not nominated
Bangladesh	Beyond the Circle	বৃত্তের বাইরে	Bengali	Golam Rabbany Biplob	Not nominated
Belgium	The Misfortunates	De helaasheid der dingen	Dutch, Aalsters Brabantian	Felix Van Groeningen	Not nominated
Bolivia	Southern District	Zona sur	Spanish, Aymara	Juan Carlos Valdivia	Not nominated
Bosnia and Herzegovina	Nightguards	Čuvari noći	Bosnian	Namik Kabil	Not nominated
Brazil	Time of Fear	Salve Geral	Brazilian Portuguese	Sergio Rezende	Not nominated
Bulgaria	The World Is Big and Salvation Lurks Around the Corner	Светът е голям и спасение дебне отвсякъде	Bulgarian, German, Italian, Slovene, English, Hungarian	Stephan Komandarev	Made shortlist
Canada	I Killed My Mother	J'ai tué ma mère	French, English, Latin	Xavier Dolan	Not nominated
Chile	Dawson, Island 10	Dawson, Isla 10	Spanish	Miguel Littin	Not nominated
China	Forever Enthralled	梅兰芳	Mandarin, Japanese	Chen Kaige	Not nominated
Colombia	The Wind Journeys	Los viajes del viento	Spanish, Palenquero, Wayuu, Arhuaco	Ciro Guerra	Not nominated
Croatia	Donkey	Kenjac	Croatian	Antonio Nuić	Not nominated
Cuba	Fallen Gods	Los dioses rotos	Spanish, Yoruba, Lucumí	Ernesto Daranas	Not nominated
Czech Republic	Protector	Protektor	Czech, German	Marek Najbrt	Not nominated
Denmark	Terribly Happy	Frygtelig lykkelig	Danish, South Jutlandic	Henrik Ruben Genz	Not nominated
Estonia	December Heat	Detsembrikuumus	Estonian, Russian, English	Asko Kase	Not nominated
Finland	Letters to Father Jacob	Postia pappi Jaakobille	Finnish	Klaus Härö	Not nominated
France	A Prophet	Un prophète	French, Arabic, Corsican	Jacques Audiard	Nominated
Georgia	The Other Bank	გაღმა ნაპირი	Abkhaz, Georgian, Russian	Giorgi Ovashvili	Not nominated
Germany	The White Ribbon	Das weiße Band	German, Italian, Polish, Latin	Michael Haneke	Nominated
Greece	Slaves in Their Bonds	Οι Σκλάβοι στα Δεσμά τους	Greek	Adonis Lykouresis	Not nominated
Hong Kong	Prince of Tears	淚王子	Mandarin	Yonfan	Not nominated
Hungary	Chameleon	Kaméleon	Hungarian	Krisztina Goda	Not nominated
Iceland	Reykjavík-Rotterdam		Icelandic, Dutch, English	Óskar Jónasson	Not nominated
India	Harishchandrachi Factory	हरिश्चंद्राची फॅक्टरी	Marathi	Paresh Mokashi	Not nominated
Indonesia	Jamila and the President	Jamila dan Sang Presiden	Indonesian	Ratna Sarumpaet	Not nominated
Iran	About Elly	درباره الی	Persian, German	Asghar Farhadi	Not nominated
Israel	Ajami	عجمي / עג'מי	Arabic, Hebrew	Yaron Shani and Scandar Copti	Nominated
Italy	Baarìa		Bagherese Sicilian, Italian	Giuseppe Tornatore	Not nominated
Japan	Nobody to Watch Over Me	誰も守ってくれない	Japanese	Ryoichi Kimizuka	Not nominated
Kazakhstan	Kelin	Келін / Невестка	No dialogue	Ermek Tursunov	Made shortlist
Lithuania	Vortex	Duburys	Lithuanian, Russian	Gytis Lukšas	Not nominated
Luxembourg	Draft Dodgers	Réfractaire	French	Nicolas Steil	Not nominated
(North Macedonia) Macedonia	Wingless	Ocas ještěrky / Созерцание	Czech	Ivo Trajkov	Not nominated
Mexico	Backyard	El traspatio	Spanish, Tzotzil, English	Carlos Carrera	Not nominated
Mongolia	By the Will of Genghis Khan	Тайна Чингис Хаана	Yakut, Russian	Andrey Borisov	Disqualified
Morocco	Casanegra	كازانيݣرا	Arabic	Nour-Eddine Lakhmari	Not nominated
Netherlands	Winter in Wartime	Oorlogswinter	Dutch, German, English, Flemish	Martin Koolhoven	Made shortlist
Norway	Max Manus		Norwegian, German, English, Russian, Finnish	Joachim Rønning and Espen Sandberg	Not nominated
Peru	The Milk of Sorrow	La teta asustada	Spanish, Ayacucho Quechua	Claudia Llosa	Nominated
Philippines	Grandpa Is Dead	Ded na si Lolo	Filipino	Soxie Topacio	Not nominated
Poland	Reverse	Rewers	Polish	Borys Lankosz	Not nominated
Portugal	Doomed Love	Um Amor de Perdição	Portuguese	Mário Barroso	Not nominated
Puerto Rico	Kabo and Platon	Kabo y Platón	Spanish	Edmundo H. Rodríguez	Not nominated
Romania	Police, Adjective	Politist, adj.	Romanian	Corneliu Porumboiu	Not nominated
Russia	Ward No. 6	Палата №6	Russian	Aleksandr Gornovskiy and Karen Shakhnazarov	Not nominated
Serbia	St. George Shoots the Dragon	Свети Георгије убива аждаху	Serbian	Srđan Dragojević	Not nominated
Slovakia	Broken Promise	Nedodržaný sľub	Slovak, Russian	Jiří Chlumský	Not nominated
Slovenia	Landscape No. 2	Pokrajina Št. 2	Slovene	Vinko Moderndorfer	Not nominated
South Africa	White Wedding		Afrikaans, Xhosa, Setswana, Zulu, English	Jann Turner	Not nominated
South Korea	Mother	마더	Korean	Bong Joon-ho	Not nominated
Spain	The Dancer and the Thief	El baile de la victoria	Spanish	Fernando Trueba	Not nominated
Sri Lanka	The Road from Elephant Pass	අලිමාන්කාඩා	Sinhala, Tamil	Chandran Rutnam	Not nominated
Sweden	Involuntary	De ofrivilliga	Swedish, English	Ruben Östlund	Not nominated
Switzerland	Home		French	Ursula Meier	Not nominated
Taiwan	Cannot Live Without You	不能沒有你	Hakka, Taiwanese Hokkien, Mandarin	Leon Dai	Not nominated
Thailand	Best of Times	ความจำสั้น แต่รักฉันยาว	Thai	Yongyoot Thongkongtoon	Not nominated
Turkey	I Saw the Sun	Güneşi Gördüm	Turkish, Northern Kurdish, Norwegian	Mahsun Kırmızıgül	Not nominated
United Kingdom	Afghan Star		Dari, Pashto, English	Havana Marking	Not nominated
Uruguay	Bad Day to Go Fishing	Mal día para pescar	Spanish, English	Álvaro Brechner	Not nominated
Venezuela	Libertador Morales, the Vigilante	Libertador Morales, el justiciero	Spanish	Efterpi Charalambidis	Not nominated
Vietnam	Don't Burn It	Đừng đốt	Vietnamese, English	Đặng Nhật Minh	Not nominated

== Notes ==
- Algeria submitted London River by Rachid Bouchareb, but it was disqualified for having more than half of its dialogue in English.
- Mongolia submitted By the Will of Genghis Khan by Andrey Borisov. The film was a Russian production and the Ministry of Culture of the Russian Federation funded its festival promotion at the 2009 Montreal World Film Festival. Mongolian filmmakers approached AMPAS about submitting the film on Mongolia's behalf shortly before the deadline. The film was disqualified, but the Academy did not publicly state its reason for disqualifying the film.
- The Netherlands originally submitted The Silent Army by Jean van de Velde on September 2, but the decision was appealed. Many Netherlands-based producers argued that the submitted film did not meet the AMPAS criteria for eligibility because it was a re-montage. The Netherlands reconvened the Oscar committee on September 21. AMPAS concluded that the entry was ineligible after which Winter in Wartime by Martin Koolhoven was submitted. In the Dutch press Winter in Wartime producer San Fu Malta lamented that the mistake made his film appear to be second choice. Voicing the sentiment of large sections of the filmsector, he argued that the committee falling under the Ministry of Education, Culture and Science should not have decided upon the Oscar nomination. That should have been done by, for instance, the jury of the Netherlands Film Festival which had the requisite expertise and was free of any conflict of interest.
- Serbia originally submitted Here and There by Darko Lungulov. After consulting with the Academy, it was found that the film contained more than half of its dialogue in English. Serbia's selection committee submitted a second film, St. George Shoots the Dragon by Srdjan Dragojevic.
- Sri Lanka submission was originally reported as being Flowers of the Sky by Prasanna Vithanage but this was changed to The Road from Elephant Pass by Chandran Rutnam.
