= Zarina Yeva =

Actress and model from Kazakhstan

- Зарина Ева
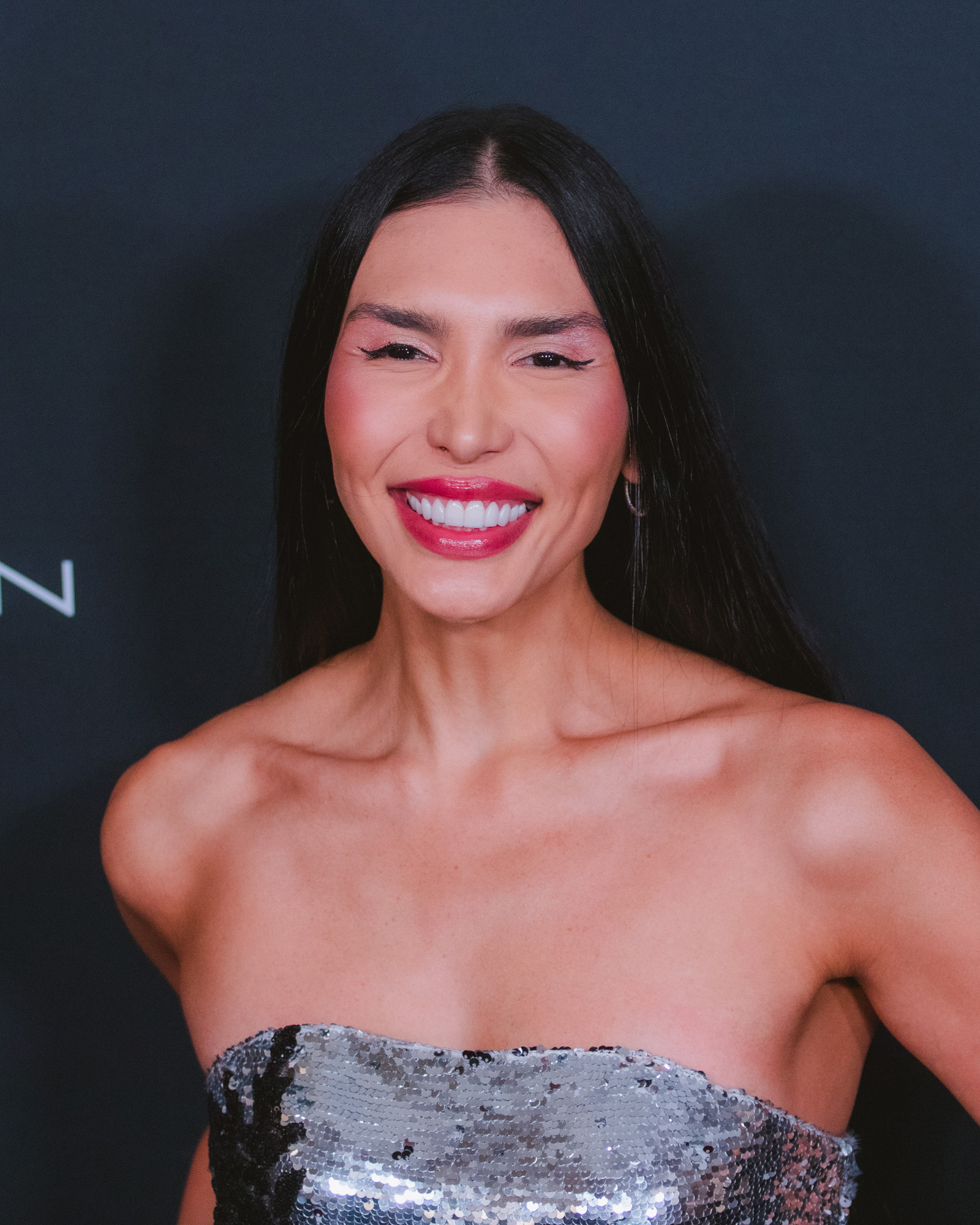
- Yeva in 2026
- Born: Taraz
- Education: New York Film Academy
- Occupations: Actor, model
- Years active: 2014–present
- Website: zarinayeva.com

Zarina Yeva (Kazakh: Зарина Ева) is a Kazakh actress and model based in the United States.

== Biography ==
=== Early years and modeling ===
Zarina Yeva began her modeling career after finishing her secondary education. After signing a contract with a Kazakh modeling agency, she participated in advertising campaigns for different brands and represented her country in the World Beauty Queen international contest held in South Korea, advancing to the final rounds. She has appeared on the covers and pages of magazines such as L'Officiel, Vogue (sharing the cover with the Kazakh model and singer Kristina Menissov), Maxim, Harper's Bazaar, Glamour and Elle; and has walked the runway at events such as the Miami Swim Week.

=== Acting ===
After obtaining a master's degree in acting in the Kazakh National Academy of Arts, she moved to Moscow to start a career in acting. There she participated in films like Vremennye trudnosti by Mikhail Raskhodnikov (2018) and Cosmoball by Dzhanik Fayziev (2020). Other film productions where she has appeared include Rustem Abdrashev's Kazakh Khanate – Golden Throne —a film submitted by Kazakhstan to compete for the Academy Award for Best International Feature Film—, and Akan Satayev's Tomiris, among others. She is currently based in Los Angeles, California and New York City.

== Filmography ==
Year	Title	Role	Notes
2015	Village Escape. Love Affair	Woman	
2018	Vremennye trudnosti	Aygerim	
2018	Biznesmeny	Anar	
2019	Kazakh Khanate – Golden Throne	Aytolgan	
2019	Tomiris	Tana	
2019	Uroki Kazahskogo	Sabina	
2020	Cosmoball	Amazonka	

== Dubbing roles ==
Year	Title	Role	Notes
2002	ChalkZone	Rudy Tabootie	Episodes 40
