= Stranger (2015 film) =

2015 film

- Film poster
- Directed by: Ermek Tursunov
- Written by: Ermek Tursunov
- Produced by: Kanat Torebay
- Starring: Roza Hairullina
- Cinematography: Marat Aliyev
- Edited by: Galimzhan Sanbayev
- Music by: Kuat Shildebayev
- Release date: 7 September 2015
- Running time: 105 minutes
- Country: Kazakhstan
- Language: Kazakh

Stranger (Kazakh: Жат, translit. Jat) is a 2015 Kazakhstani drama film written and directed by Ermek Tursunov. The film was selected as the Kazakhstani entry for the Best Foreign Language Film at the 88th Academy Awards but it was not nominated. It was screened in the Contemporary World Cinema section of the 2015 Toronto International Film Festival.

== Cast ==
- Roza Hairullina as Zina
- Mikhail Karpov as Ibrai
- Erzhan Nurymbet as Iliyas

== See also ==
- List of submissions to the 88th Academy Awards for Best Foreign Language Film
- List of Kazakhstani submissions for the Academy Award for Best Foreign Language Film
