= Kristina Menissov =

Model and singer from Kazakhstan

- Born: Almaty, Kazakhstan
- Education: Almaty Conservatory
- Occupations: Model, singer
- Years active: 2013–present
- Modeling information
- Height: 5 ft 9 in (175 cm)
- Hair color: Black
- Eye color: Brown

Kristina Menissov is a Kazakhstani Ethiopian model and singer based in the United States. During her career she has appeared on the pages or covers of magazines like Vogue, Glamour, Harper's Bazaar and Elle, and has worked with brands and designers such as Cartier, Chopard, Yves Saint Laurent, Balmain and Michael Costello. In the early 2020s she began a career as a solo singer in the electronic and pop genres.

== Biography ==
=== As a model ===
Menissov was born in Almaty, Kazakhstan. Based in the United States since the mid-2010s, she began her career as a professional model in 2017, and has since appeared on the pages or covers of magazines such as Elle, Glamour, Harper's Bazaar and Vogue, in the latter sharing the cover with the Kazakh model and actress Zarina Yeva. She has participated in campaigns for brands and designers like Chopard, Cartier, Michael Costello, Balmain, Roberto Cavalli, Yves Saint Laurent, Michael Ngo, Nia Lynn and Jovani Dresses, in addition to walking the runways at the Miami and Los Angeles fashion weeks.

In 2018 Menissov appeared as a guest on the talk show Models Talk, and two years later she starred in the music video for the song "Ibiza" by American rapper Tyga.

In 2023, Menissov partnered with fellow model Joanna Borov in a campaign supporting the Judith A. Bassett Canid Education & Conservation Center, an NGO that cares for rescued wolves and foxes. The campaign was featured on billboards throughout Los Angeles to promote animal welfare and ethical practices in the fashion industry.

=== As a singer ===
A graduate of the Almaty Conservatory and musically trained in Italy, Menissov began her career as a solo singer in the early 2020s. With the collaboration of producer Andrew Lane, known for his work with artists such as Irene Cara and Backstreet Boys, she released her first pop single, titled "Taking Over L.A." in July 2020. In April 2021 she recorded with Italian singer and DJ Marzia Dorlando the electronic song "Breakout", and later that year Glamour magazine announced that she was working on a new single with model and singer Darian Dali, under Lane's production. Menissov has also recorded other musical collaborations with artists such as DJ Umberto and Gipsy Kings.
