= Rashid Nugmanov =

Kazakh film director and activist (born 1954)

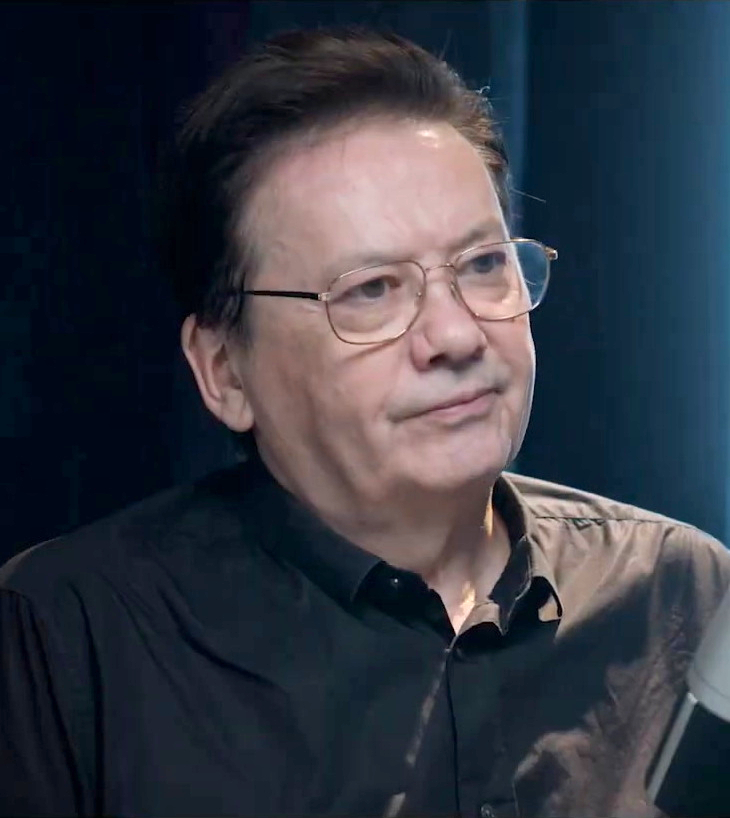
- Nugmanov in 2022
- Born: Рашид Нугманов; March 19, 1954 (age 72); Alma-Ata, Kazakhstan
- Other name: Rachid Nougmanov
- Occupations: Architect, film director, screenwriter, producer, human rights activist
- Years active: 1971–present
- Awards

Rashid Nugmanov, also written as French: Rachid Nougmanov; Russian: Рашид Мусаевич Нугманов; born March 19, 1954, in Alma-Ata, Kazakhstan) is a Kazakh film director, dissident, political activist and founder of the Kazakh New Wave cinema movement.

Rashid Nugmanov is a Chevalier of the Ordre des Arts et des Lettres of France since 21 April 2017.

== Film career ==
Rashid Nugmanov was born into a Kazakh family on March 19, 1954. After graduating in 1977 from the Architectural Institute in Alma-Ata, Nugmanov enrolled at the prestigious Moscow State Film Institute (VGIK), the world's first institute of cinematography in 1984. His directorial debut, The Needle, premiered in September 1988 at the "Golden Duke" Festival in Odesa, where it won the Un Certain Regard prize. Starring popular Soviet rock musician Viktor Tsoi, it was one of the first films to break the taboo against talking about drug addiction in the Soviet Union. The film was released in the USSR in February 1989 with 1,000 prints in circulation and became a box office hit viewed by over 30 million cinemagoers. The film was also a critical success, winning First Prize at the Nuremberg Film Festival and initiating the "Kazakh New Wave". He declared, in 1990, the motto of the New Wave of Kazakh cinema: "We demand no unified philosophy nor uniform artistic views on art. We are unified, instead, in our freedom and love of art". Nugmanov served as President of the Union of Kazakh Filmmakers from 1989 until 1992, when he wrote, directed and produced The Wild East, a post-apocalyptic punk samurai Ostern which attracted international acclaim at film festivals in Venice, Los Angeles, and Tokyo, and was awarded the Prix Special du Jury in Valenciennes, France. The film marked the end of both the Kazakh New Wave and Nugmanov's active directorial career, although he continued to write screenplays and provide script doctoring throughout the 1990s. In 2008, Nougmanov returned to filmmaking by writing, directing, and producing the feature film "The Needle: Remix" (in Russian: Игла Remix). In 2021, he wrote, directed, and produced the feature documentary "Batu: Historical Detective".

== Activism ==
Nugmanov moved to Paris, France, in 1993. From 1998 through 2006, Nugmanov became involved in active promotion of human rights and served as the General Director of the International Freedom Network, a London-based think tank created to foster democracy in the former Soviet Union. A harsh critic of the political regime of Nursultan Nazarbaev, which he has decried as "virtual democracy", Nugmanov has been responsible for the international relations of dissident organisations including the Forum for Democratic Forces of Kazakhstan and Central Asia, Republican People's Party of Kazakhstan, Democratic Choice of Kazakhstan, and For a Just Kazakhstan.

== Filmography ==
- Batu: Historical Detective (2021)
- The Needle Remix (2010)
- The Wild East (1993)
- The Needle (1988)
- Iskusstvo byt smirnym (1987)
- Yahha (1986)
- Zgga (1977)
- The Snow Band (1971)
