= The Voice of Kazakhstan season 5 =

The Voice of Kazakhstan
- Season 5
- Presented by: Galym Kenshilik; Taukel Musilim
- Coaches: Alem; Mayra Muhammad; Saken Maigaziyev; Arapbayeva Marzhan
- Winner: Quralay Meyrambek
- Winning coach: Saken Maigaziyev
- Runner-up: Erik Tölenov

Release
- Original network: Qazaqstan TV
- Original release: September 4 – December 25, 2021

The fifth season of musical reality show The Voice of Kazakhstan (Kazakh : Qazaqstan дауысы / Qazaqstan Dauisi) premiered on September 4, 2021. This is the revival of the show after the four year absence to the country's television and the airing of the program once again commissioned by Qazaqstan TV after the airing of its season four to Perviy Kanal Evraziya.

With the new season, new coaches and presenters are in line. Alem, Arapbayeva Marzhan, Mayra Muhammad and Saken Maigaziyev are the new coaches of the show. Galym Kenshilik and Taukel Musilim are the new presenters.

Quralay Meryambek from Team Saken was proclaimed as the winner of the "Voice of Kazakhstan 2021". With Meryambek's victory, this marks Saken's first win of the show.

== Teams ==
- Winner
- Runner-up
- Third place
- Fourth place
- Eliminated in the Live Shows
- Eliminated in the Knockouts
- Eliminated in the Battle rounds

Coaches	Top 64 artists					
Alem						
Alem	Erik Tölenov	Beksultan Kenishkaliev	Ayan Bayjigit	Nurjigit Subanqulov	Alima Turarbek	Rimma Akhmetova
Alem	Inzhu Bolat	Nurbolat Qanay	Danïyar Meyram	Almat Turlıqoja	Rïza Mağzom	Ruslan Azhigaliev
Alem	Azïz Äbdirasul	Äygerim Zhangïldïnova	Alwa Nurlıbaeva	Tomïrïs Nurqoja		
Mayra Muhammad						
Mayra Muhammad	Ernar Amandıq	Raxman Sätïev	Murat Dälelxan	Ardaq Tölepbergen	Aynur Nurpeyisova	Äygerim Temirbekova
Mayra Muhammad	Muxammedäli Sultanov	Nuray Seyitqalïev	Nurqanat Tapïev	Serik Jubatqan	Aizhan Zharkynbek	Güldana Muratbay
Mayra Muhammad	Ajar Järdenbekqızı	Nurasıl Satıbaldı	Äset Köşerbay	Viktoriya Buleeva		
Saken Maigaziyev						
Saken Maigaziyev	Quralay Meyrambek	Danïyar Kärim	Anna Uvarova	Jayna Tarğınova	Madïna Jumabaeva	Ädil Axmetjanov
Saken Maigaziyev	Ernazar Juban	Janïya Qarabatır	Altınbek Aqnïet	Küläyim Qayırbaeva	Nurbolat Qosanov	Balawsa Sansızbay
Saken Maigaziyev	Diana Altayevna	Janerke Qabataeva	Birzhan Nazarov	Älïya Namïyalïeva		
Arapbayeva Marzhan						
Arapbayeva Marzhan	Aruzhan Aydarbek	Venera Ismagilova	Tatia Kobaladze	Aydana Nawkeeva	Medet Orynbaev	Madï Syzdiqov
Arapbayeva Marzhan	Diana Bekmurzaeva	Arsen Narkhanov	Janerke Qabdrashitova	Baqtiyar Aqylbek	Ayawlım Qusayın	Dwman Raxım
Arapbayeva Marzhan	Lana Sapïna	Dana Mazhitova	Talğat Manas	Alwa Serikqazy		

== Blind Auditions ==
Blind Auditions premiered on September 4, 2021. Coaches must have 16 members on its team at the end of the blind Auditions

Blind auditions colour key
✔	Coach pressed "I WANT YOU" button
	Artist defaulted to a coach's team
	Artist picked a coach's team
	Artist eliminated as no coach pressing their button
	Four-chair turner artist

Blind auditions results
Episode	Order	Artist	Age	Song	Coach's and artist's choices			
Episode	Order	Artist	Age	Song	Alem	Mayra	Saken	Marzhan
Episode 1 (September 4, 2021)	1	Beksultan Kenishkaliev	25	"It's a Man's Man's World"	✔	—	✔	✔
Episode 1 (September 4, 2021)	2	Alima Turarbek	18	"Bir suraq"	✔	—	—	—
Episode 1 (September 4, 2021)	3	Bakhtiyar Aqylbek	24	"Qayda"	—	—	—	✔
Episode 1 (September 4, 2021)	4	Bekbolat Saghadiev	28	"Sen qasımda bolmasañ"	—	—	—	—
Episode 1 (September 4, 2021)	5	Alua Serikqazy	17	"Can't Be Love"	✔	✔	✔	✔
Episode 1 (September 4, 2021)	6	Birzhan Nazarov	29	"Qoş, maxabbat"	—	—	✔	—
Episode 1 (September 4, 2021)	7	Ruslan Azhigaliev	27	"There's Nothing Holding Me Back"	✔	—	—	—
Episode 1 (September 4, 2021)	8	Güldana Muratbay	28	"Samaltau"	✔	✔	✔	✔
Episode 1 (September 4, 2021)	9	Dilnaz Musazhanova	19	"Ayıptama"	—	—	—	—
Episode 1 (September 4, 2021)	10	Mïras Äbdikärim	—	"Asıl zhanım-ay"	—	—	—	—
Episode 1 (September 4, 2021)	11	Inzhu Bolat	19	"Isn't She Lovely"	✔	✔	✔	✔
Episode 1 (September 4, 2021)	12	Medet Orynbaev	—	"Bulbul qus"	✔	✔	✔	✔
Episode 2 (September 11, 2021)	1	Aruzhan Aydarbek	20	"Fallin'"	✔	✔	✔	✔
Episode 2 (September 11, 2021)	2	Azïz Äbdirasul	34	"Kök aspan"	✔	—	—	—
Episode 2 (September 11, 2021)	3	Almagul Nabïeva	31	"Aytarım joq"	—	—	—	—
Episode 2 (September 11, 2021)	4	Anna Uvarova	22	"Sen"	✔	✔	✔	✔
Episode 2 (September 11, 2021)	5	Ernazar Juban	22	"Don`t You Worry `bout a Thing"	✔	✔	✔	✔
Episode 2 (September 11, 2021)	6	Madï Syzdiqov	32	"Tañğı qala"	✔	✔	✔	✔
Episode 2 (September 11, 2021)	7	Janerke Qabdrashitova	27	"Qazaq eli osınday"	✔	✔	✔	✔
Episode 2 (September 11, 2021)	8	Araylım Bayarlïna	37	"Armanıma asığamın"	—	—	—	—
Episode 2 (September 11, 2021)	9	Venera Ismagilova	27	"Tamşılar"	✔	✔	✔	✔
Episode 2 (September 11, 2021)	10	Muxamedäli Sultanov	29	"This Masquerade"	✔	✔	—	—
Episode 2 (September 11, 2021)	11	Khalid Orynkul	24	"Gülstan - Qazaqstanım"	—	—	—	—
Episode 2 (September 11, 2021)	12	Diana Bekmurzaeva	26	"If Ain't Got You"	✔	✔	✔	✔
Episode 3 (September 18, 2021)	1	Aysha Umbet	22	"Ayşa bïbi"	—	—	—	—
Episode 3 (September 18, 2021)	2	Alwa Nurlıbaeva	19	"Qoy, kürsinbe"	✔	—	—	—
Episode 3 (September 18, 2021)	3	Anar Berliqulova	49	"I don`t Lose You"	—	—	—	—
Episode 3 (September 18, 2021)	4	Victoria Buleeva	22	"Bring Me To Life"	✔	✔	✔	—
Episode 3 (September 18, 2021)	5	Diana Altayevna	22	"Qısmet"	—	—	✔	—
Episode 3 (September 18, 2021)	6	Äygerim Temirbekova	19	"Bulbul"	—	✔	—	—
Episode 3 (September 18, 2021)	7	Quralay Meyrambek	18	"Qorqıt-qobız"	✔	✔	✔	✔
Episode 3 (September 18, 2021)	8	Mïrjan Jïdebay	16	"Sağan ğaşıq"	—	—	—	—
Episode 3 (September 18, 2021)	9	Nurjigit Swbanqwlov	34	"Stand by Me"	✔	—	✔	—
Episode 3 (September 18, 2021)	10	Rïza Mağzom	21	"Неге?"	✔	—	—	—
Episode 3 (September 18, 2021)	11	Serik Jubatqan	25	"Moldabaydıñ äni"	—	✔	—	—
Episode 3 (September 18, 2021)	12	Tatia Kobaladze	28	"Sulika"	✔	✔	—	✔
Episode 4 (September 25, 2021)	1	Arsen Narkhanov	21	"Telefon"	—	—	✔	✔
Episode 4 (September 25, 2021)	2	Allahverdi Karimov	27	"Bul ömirde"	—	—	—	—
Episode 4 (September 25, 2021)	3	Raxman Sätïev	18	"SOS d'un terrien en détresse"	—	✔	✔	✔
Episode 4 (September 25, 2021)	4	Dana Mazhitova	18	"Samaltaw"	—	✔	—	✔
Episode 4 (September 25, 2021)	5	Danïyar Meyram	24	"Maxabbatım"	✔	✔	—	—
Episode 4 (September 25, 2021)	6	Äset Köşerbay	23	"Ulıtaw"	—	✔	—	—
Episode 4 (September 25, 2021)	7	Madïna Jumabaeva	19	"Ain't nobody"	✔	✔	✔	—
Episode 4 (September 25, 2021)	8	Qïyaş Baqıtjan	19	"Ökinbe sen"	—	—	—	—
Episode 4 (September 25, 2021)	9	Talğat Manas	20	"When a Man Loves a Woman"	✔	✔	—	✔
Episode 4 (September 25, 2021)	10	Aida Baigelova	31	"Jelkildek"	—	—	—	—
Episode 4 (September 25, 2021)	11	Murat Dälelxan	52	"Tıñnan bastaw"	—	✔	—	✔
Episode 4 (September 25, 2021)	12	Altınbek Aqnïet	26	"Allağa şükir"	—	—	✔	✔
Episode 4 (September 25, 2021)	13	Ädil Axmetjanov	30	"Köñil şirkin"	✔	✔	✔	✔
Episode 5 (October 2, 2021)	1	Ardaq Tölepbergen	24	"Sağındım seni"	—	✔	—	—
Episode 5 (October 2, 2021)	2	Äygerim Jangïldïnova	25	"Burnin up"	✔	—	—	—
Episode 5 (October 2, 2021)	3	Nuray Seyitqalïev	19	"If I Were a Boy"	—	✔	—	—
Episode 5 (October 2, 2021)	4	Janerke Qabataeva	24	"Sen ediñ"	—	—	✔	—
Episode 5 (October 2, 2021)	5	Danïyar Kärim	24	"Tonight again"	✔	—	✔	✔
Episode 5 (October 2, 2021)	6	Farïda Süyewbaeva	46	"Bew, ayday"	—	—	—	—
Episode 5 (October 2, 2021)	7	Ayawlım Qusayın	18	"Ala ketpediñ"	—	—	✔	✔
Episode 5 (October 2, 2021)	8	Ädilxan Jeksenbaev	30	"Xat jazıp tur"	—	—	—	—
Episode 5 (October 2, 2021)	9	Küläyim Qayırbaeva	29	"Men jaylı"	—	—	✔	✔
Episode 5 (October 2, 2021)	10	Nurbolat Qanay	28	"Tağdır"	✔	✔	—	—
Episode 5 (October 2, 2021)	11	Rimma Akhmetova	17	"Hit the Road Jack"	✔	✔	✔	✔
Episode 5 (October 2, 2021)	12	Nurdana Arğın	22	"Sarjaylaw"	—	—	—	—
Episode 6 (October 9, 2021)	1	Ajar Järdenbekqızı	18	"Qazağımsıñ"	—	✔	—	—
Episode 6 (October 9, 2021)	2	Nurasıl Satıbaldı	21	"O, maxabbat"	✔	✔	—	—
Episode 6 (October 9, 2021)	3	Nurbolat Qosanov	29	"Joldar"	—	—	✔	—
Episode 6 (October 9, 2021)	4	Sangina Sharipova	19	"Queen Of The Night"	—	—	—	—
Episode 6 (October 9, 2021)	5	Oljas Ospan	27	"Djaz älemi"	—	—	—	—
Episode 6 (October 9, 2021)	6	Ayan Bayjigit	22	"Smile"	✔	✔	✔	✔
Episode 6 (October 9, 2021)	7	Lana Sapïna	19	"Qazağım-ay"	—	—	✔	✔
Episode 6 (October 9, 2021)	8	Balawsa Sansızbay	16	"Stand up"	—	—	✔	✔
Episode 6 (October 9, 2021)	9	Ernar Amandıq	22	"Sandwğaş"	—	✔	—	—
Episode 6 (October 9, 2021)	10	Dwman Raxım	26	"Someone You Loved"	—	—	—	✔
Episode 6 (October 9, 2021)	11	Janïya Qarabatır	21	"Bang Bang"	—	—	✔	—
Episode 6 (October 9, 2021)	12	Aqerke Amalyat	19	"Ğaşıq jürek"	—	—	—	—
Episode 7 (October 16, 2021)	1	Mırzaxmet Dïas	26	"I Feel Good"	—	—	—	—
Episode 7 (October 16, 2021)	2	Erik Tölenov	28	"Jan ana"	✔	—	—	✔
Episode 7 (October 16, 2021)	3	Farïza Dosbolova	16	"Jibek sezim"	—	—	—	—
Episode 7 (October 16, 2021)	4	Tomïrïs Nurqoja	19	"Bang Bang"	✔	✔	✔	✔
Episode 7 (October 16, 2021)	5	Jayna Tarğınova	18	"Zawreş"	—	—	✔	—
Episode 7 (October 16, 2021)	6	Aydana Nawkeeva	29	"Sıy"	✔	✔	✔	✔
Episode 7 (October 16, 2021)	7	Aynur Nurpeyisova	30	"Still love you"	—	✔	—	Team Full
Episode 7 (October 16, 2021)	8	Nurqanat Tapïev	21	"Tıñda"	✔	✔	✔	Team Full
Episode 7 (October 16, 2021)	9	Almat Turlıqoja	26	"Jarq etpes qara köñilim ne qılsa da"	✔	—	—	Team Full
Episode 7 (October 16, 2021)	10	Aizhan Zharkynbek	19	"Survivor"	Team Full	✔	—	Team Full
Episode 7 (October 16, 2021)	11	Medet Slamğazı	24	"Bomba"	Team Full	Team Full	—	Team Full
Episode 7 (October 16, 2021)	12	Älïya Namïyalïeva	20	"Qazağım-ay"	Team Full	Team Full	✔	Team Full

== The Battles ==
The battle rounds began on October 23. Each coach has sixteen artists on their team, narrowing down into pair to sing a song together. No "Steal" were available at this round. Artist who win their respective battle will go through to the next round.

Battles colour key
Artist won the Battle and advanced to the Knockouts
Artist lost the Battle and was eliminated

Episode	Coach	Order	Winner	Song	Loser
Episode 8 (October 23, 2021)	Alem	1	Beksultan Kenişqalïev	"Qosıla şırqayıq"	Aigerim Zhangildinova
Episode 8 (October 23, 2021)	Saken	2	Jayna Tarğınova	"Aynamköz"	Dïana Altayqızı
Episode 8 (October 23, 2021)	Marzhan	3	Medet Orınbaev	"Almatınıñ tünderi-ay"	Dana Majitova
Episode 8 (October 23, 2021)	Mayra	4	Ernar Amandıq	"Gül Almatı"	Nurqanat Tapïev
Episode 8 (October 23, 2021)	Alem	5	Alïma Turarbek	"Boyı bulğañ"	Alwa Nurlıbaeva
Episode 8 (October 23, 2021)	Mayra	6	Ardaq Tölepbergen	"The Phantom of the Opera"	Viktoriya Buleeva
Episode 8 (October 23, 2021)	Marzhan	7	Diana Bekmurzaeva	"I Wanna be Loved by You"	Talgat Manas
Episode 8 (October 23, 2021)	Saken	8	Ernazar Juban	"Senen basqa"	Balawsa Sansızbay
Episode 9 (October 30, 2021)	Marzhan	1	Aydana Nawkeeva	"Ömir - öze"	Lana Sapïna
Episode 9 (October 30, 2021)	Alem	2	Nurjigit Subanqulov	"20, 21 Sholy"	Azïz Äbdirasul
Episode 9 (October 30, 2021)	Saken	3	Danïyar Kärim	"How come, How long"	Birjan Nazarov
Episode 9 (October 30, 2021)	Mayra	4	Murat Dälelxan	"Sulw boyjetken"	Äset Köşerbay
Episode 9 (October 30, 2021)	Marzhan	5	Venera Ïsmagïlova	"I'm Your Baby Tonight"	Alwa Serikqızı
Episode 9 (October 30, 2021)	Alem	6	Rïmma Axmetova	"Unaydı mağan"	Tomïrïs Nurqoja
Episode 9 (October 30, 2021)	Mayra	7	Äygerim Temirbekova	"Men senimen kezdestim"	Nurasıl Satıbaldı
Episode 9 (October 30, 2021)	Saken	8	Anna Uvarova	"Sway"	Janerke Qabataeva
Episode 10 (November 6, 2021)	Saken	1	Janïya Qarabatır	"Sen kelersiñ"	Nurbolat Qosan
Episode 10 (November 6, 2021)	Marzhan	2	Arsen Narxanov	"Latte"	Ayawlım Qusayın
Episode 10 (November 6, 2021)	Saken	3	Madïna Jumabaeva	"Munı nege bilmeysiñ?"	Küläyim Qayırbaeva
Episode 10 (November 6, 2021)	Mayra	4	Nuray Seyitqalïeva	"Ayla"	Ajar Jardenbekqızı
Episode 10 (November 6, 2021)	Marzhan	5	Arujan Aydarbek	"Arıs jağasında"	Dwman Raxım
Episode 10 (November 6, 2021)	Alem	6	Erik Tulenov	"Leave the Door Open"	Ruslan Azhigaliev
Episode 10 (November 6, 2021)	Alem	7	Nurbolat Qanay	"Juldızım"	Rïza Mağzom
Episode 10 (November 6, 2021)	Mayra	8	Muxammedäli Sultanov	"Time To Say Goodbye"	Güldana Muratbay
Episode 11 (November 13, 2021)	Mayra	1	Raxman Sätïev	"Prince Igor"	Aizhan Zharkynbek
Episode 11 (November 13, 2021)	Alem	2	Ayan Bayjigit	"Sağındım seni"	Almat Turlıqoja
Episode 11 (November 13, 2021)	Saken	3	Ädil Axmetjanov	"Asıl ana"	Altınbek Aqnïet
Episode 11 (November 13, 2021)	Marzhan	4	Madï Sızdıqov	"Maxabbat muñı"	Baqtïyar Aqılbek
Episode 11 (November 13, 2021)	Alem	5	Inzhu Bolat	"Can't help falling in love"	Danïyar Meyram
Episode 11 (November 13, 2021)	Saken	6	Quralay Meyrambek	"Qay zaman"	Älïya Namïyalïeva
Episode 11 (November 13, 2021)	Mayra	7	Aynur Nurpeyisova	"Sügirdiñ termesi"	Serik Jubatqan
Episode 11 (November 13, 2021)	Marzhan	8	Tatïya Kobaladze	"Qusnï-Qorlan"	Janerke Qabdraşïtova

== Knockouts ==
Knockout Rounds began on November 20. The remaining eight contestant is divided into two batch per episode (quartets). In this round, instead of grouping them into trio or quartets, there will be two seats available in the backstage. After a contestant performs a song of his or her choice, he or she will sit in one of these seats; this will occur for the first two artists performing on a team.

However, after these first contestants perform, the fate of the third artist will be decided based on whether his or her coach would like to switch out an artist already seated in favor of this performer. In the case of a switch-out, the artist that was switched out will be eliminated, and this performer will sit down. If the coach would instead like to keep the performers already seated and thus not give a seat to this performer, he or she will be immediately eliminated. After all artists in the batch have performed, those who end up seated will advance to the next round. At the end of the round, four artists will be remaining on the team.

Knockouts colour key
Artist was given a chair and advanced to the Live shows
Artist was eliminated after being switched in favor of another artist
Artist was eliminated automatically

Episode	Coach	Order	Artist	Song	Chair given	Switched with	Final result
Episode 12 (November 20)	Marzhan	1	Aydana Nawkeeva	"Keşir meni"	✔	N/A	Advanced
Episode 12 (November 20)	Marzhan	2	Diana Bekmurzaeva	"Arman joldar"	✔	N/A	Eliminated
Episode 12 (November 20)	Marzhan	3	Arsen Narxanov	"Jılaydı jürek"	Not Given	N/A	Eliminated
Episode 12 (November 20)	Marzhan	4	Tatïya Kobaladze	"I Will Always Love You"	✔	Diana Bekmurzaeva	Advanced
Episode 12 (November 20)	Mayra	5	Muxammedäli Sultanov	"Jayaw"	✔	N/A	Eliminated
Episode 12 (November 20)	Mayra	6	Murat Dälelxan	"Atameken"	✔	N/A	Advanced
Episode 12 (November 20)	Mayra	7	Ernar Amandıq	"Atameken"	✔	Murat Dälelxan	Advanced
Episode 12 (November 20)	Mayra	8	Nuray Seyitqalïeva	"I'm Outta Love"	Not Given	N/A	Eliminated
Episode 12 (November 20)	Saken	9	Janïya Qarabatır	"DOP"	✔	N/A	Eliminated
Episode 12 (November 20)	Saken	10	Ernazar Juban	"Armandaymın adam bop jaralğan soñ"	✔	N/A	Eliminated
Episode 12 (November 20)	Saken	11	Janïya Qarabatır	"Qız däwren-än däwren"	✔	Janïya Qarabatır	Advanced
Episode 12 (November 20)	Saken	12	Quralay Meyrambek	"Listen"	✔	Ernazar Juban	Advanced
Episode 12 (November 20)	Alem	13	Inzhu Bolat	"Men seni süyemin"	✔	N/A	Eliminated
Episode 12 (November 20)	Alem	14	Nurjigit Subanqulov	"Way Down We Go"	✔	N/A	Advanced
Episode 12 (November 20)	Alem	15	Ayan Bayjigit	"Mooz"	✔	Inzhu Bolat	Advanced
Episode 12 (November 20)	Alem	16	Nurbolat Qanay	"Jıltır köylek"	Not Given	N/A	Eliminated
Episode 13 (November 27)	Saken	1	Danïyar Kärim	"Suranamın"	✔	N/A	Advanced
Episode 13 (November 27)	Saken	2	Ädil Axmetjanov	"Qïyalï qız"	✔	N/A	Eliminated
Episode 13 (November 27)	Saken	3	Madïna Jumabaeva	"Ündemediñ"	✔	Ädil Axmetjanov	Eliminated
Episode 13 (November 27)	Saken	4	Anna Uvarova	"Köziñniñ möldirin-ay"	✔	Madïna Jumabaeva	Advanced
Episode 13 (November 27)	Mayra	5	Ardaq Tölepbergen	"Baqıt quşağında"	✔	N/A	Advanced
Episode 13 (November 27)	Mayra	6	Aynur Nurpeyisova	"Esiñde me?"	✔	N/A	Eliminated
Episode 13 (November 27)	Mayra	7	Raxman Sätïev	"Lovely"	✔	Aynur Nurpeyisova	Advanced
Episode 13 (November 27)	Mayra	8	Äygerim Temirbekova	"Gawhar tas"	Not Given	N/A	Eliminated
Episode 13 (November 27)	Alem	10	Rïmma Axmetova	"Shou"	✔	N/A	Eliminated
Episode 13 (November 27)	Alem	9	Erik Tulenov	"Ğasırlıq muñ"	✔	N/A	Advanced
Episode 13 (November 27)	Alem	11	Beksultan Kenişqalïev	"I have nothing"	✔	Rïmma Axmetova	Advanced
Episode 13 (November 27)	Alem	12	Alïma Turarbek	"Forever"	Not Given	N/A	Eliminated
Episode 13 (November 27)	Marzhan	13	Arujan Aydarbek	"Human"	✔	N/A	Advanced
Episode 13 (November 27)	Marzhan	14	Madï Sızdıqov	"I Don’t Want to Miss a Thing"	✔	N/A	Eliminated
Episode 13 (November 27)	Marzhan	15	Venera Ïsmagïlova	"Alğaşqı köktem"	✔	Madï Sızdıqov	Advanced
Episode 13 (November 27)	Marzhan	16	Medet Orınbaev	"Jalt etip ötken"	Not Given	N/A	Eliminated

== Live Shows ==
Live Shows aired on Saturdays at 20:40. Each week there is a one contestant would be eliminated per team. Live shows divided into four stages; the Concerts, Quarterfinals, Semi-Finals and the Grand Finale. Although it is broadcast live, three weeks of lives doesn't involve interactive real-time voting, thus, the coaches themselves would determine on who will advance to the next round.

Artist was saved and advanced to the next phase.
Artist was eliminated

=== Live Concerts Week 1 (December 4) ===
Live Shows begin at Top 16. Each contestant will perform a song for their coach whether to proceed in next phase or not. The show for the week would be concluded by eliminating one contestant out of four.

Episode	Coach	Order	Artist	Song	Results
Episode 14 (December 4)	Marzhan	1	Arujan Aydarbek	«Өткінші сезім»	Coaches' Choice
Episode 14 (December 4)	Mayra	2	Ardaq Tölepbergen	«Япурай»	Eliminated
Episode 14 (December 4)	Alem	3	Beksultan Kenişqalïev	«Қайтадан»	Coaches' Choice
Episode 14 (December 4)	Marzhan	4	Tatya Kobaladze	«Туған жер»	Coaches' Choice
Episode 14 (December 4)	Mayra	5	Ernar Armandiq	"I Just Called to Say I Love You"	Coaches' Choice
Episode 14 (December 4)	Alem	6	Erik Tolenov	"Call Out My Name"	Coaches' Choice
Episode 14 (December 4)	Mayra	7	Murat Dälelxan	«Құтты ұям»	Coaches' Choice
Episode 14 (December 4)	Saken	8	Janïya Qarabatır	«Ізін көрем»	Eliminated
Episode 14 (December 4)	Marzhan	9	Venera Ismagilova	«Жаным»	Coaches' Choice
Episode 14 (December 4)	Saken	10	Quralay Meyrambek	«Үзілмес үміт»	Coaches' Choice
Episode 14 (December 4)	Alem	11	Nurjigit Subanqulov	«Қайран көңіл-ай»	Eliminated
Episode 14 (December 4)	Mayra	12	Raxman Sätïev	"Remember"	Coaches' Choice
Episode 14 (December 4)	Saken	13	Danïyar Kärim	«Оригиналсың»	Coaches' Choice
Episode 14 (December 4)	Marzhan	14	Aydana Nawkeeva	"Roar"	Eliminated
Episode 14 (December 4)	Saken	15	Anna Uvarova	«Өмір-өмір»	Coaches' Choice
Episode 14 (December 4)	Alem	16	Ayan Bayjigit	«Куә бол»	Coaches' Choice

=== Week 2 : Quarter-finals (December 11) ===
Episode	Coach	Order	Artist	Song	Results
Episode 15 (December 11)	Mayra	1	Murat Dalexan	«Ақтамақ»	Eliminated
Episode 15 (December 11)	Alem	2	Ayan Bayjigit	«Зымыран»	Eliminated
Episode 15 (December 11)	Saken	3	Anna Uvarova	«Тағы да сүй»	Eliminated
Episode 15 (December 11)	Mayra	4	Raxman Sätïev	«Балқадиша»	Coaches' Choice
Episode 15 (December 11)	Marzhan	5	Venera Ismagilova	«Ән әлемі»	Coaches' Choice
Episode 15 (December 11)	Alem	6	Erik Tolenov	«Жүрек үні»	Coaches' Choice
Episode 15 (December 11)	Mayra	7	Ernar Armandiq	«Шәпибай-ау»	Coaches' Choice
Episode 15 (December 11)	Saken	8	Quralay Meyrambek	«Hepsi Senin Mi»	Coaches' Choice
Episode 15 (December 11)	Alem	9	Beksultan Kenişqalïev	«Ей, лапылда»	Coaches' Choice
Episode 15 (December 11)	Marzhan	10	Tatya Kobaladze	«Арго»	Eliminated
Episode 15 (December 11)	Saken	11	Danïyar Kärim	«Сағынып жүрмін»	Coaches' Choice
Episode 15 (December 11)	Marzhan	12	Arujan Aydarbek	«Домбыра туралы баллада»	Coaches' Choice

=== Week 3 : Semi-finals (December 18) ===
Episode	Coach	Order	Artist	Song	Results
Episode 16 (December 11)	Mayra	1	Raxman Sätïev	"Өмірге ғашықпын"	Eliminated
Episode 16 (December 11)	Marzhan	2	Venera Ismagilova	"Stop / Uptown Funk"	Eliminated
Episode 16 (December 11)	Alem	3	Erik Tolenov	"Қош бол"	Alem's Choice
Episode 16 (December 11)	Mayra	4	Ernar Armandiq	"Aq sisa"	Mayra's Choice
Episode 16 (December 11)	Saken	5	Quralay Meyrambek	"My Heart Will Go On"	Saken's Choice
Episode 16 (December 11)	Alem	6	Beksultan Kenişqalïev	"Алыстама менен"	Eliminated
Episode 16 (December 11)	Saken	7	Danïyar Kärim	"Жауап бер"	Eliminated
Episode 16 (December 11)	Marzhan	8	Arujan Aydarbek	"Rolling in the Deep"	Marzhan's Choice

=== Week 4 : The Grand Finale (December 25) ===
Artist was proclaimed as the winner
Artist ended as the runner-up
Artist ended as the third placer
Artist ended as the fourth placer

Coach	Artist	Round 1 : Solo Song		Round 2 : Duet with Coach		Result
Coach	Artist	Order	Song	Song	With	Result
Mayra	Ernar Armandiq	1	«Көзімнің қарасы»	"You Raised Me Up"	Mayra Muhammad	Third Place
Marzhan	Arujan Aydarbek	2	«Ана туралы баллада»	«Самға, Қазақстан»	Arapbayeva Marzhan	Fourth Place
Alem	Erik Tolenov	3	«Дударай»	"Love Me Again"	Alem	Runner-up
Saken	Quralay Meyrambek	4	«Толғау»	«Арман-ау»	Saken Maigaziyev	Winner

== Elimination Chart ==
=== Results Key ===
Winner	Saved by their coach
Runner-up	Eliminated
Third place
Fourth place

Team Alem
Team Mayra
Team Saken
Team Marzhan

=== Overall Elimination ===
Artists	Week 1 Live Concerts	Week 2 Quarterfinals	Week 3 Semi-Finals	Week 4 Finale Week
Quralay Meyrambek	Safe	Safe	Advanced	Winner
Erik Tolenov	Safe	Safe	Advanced	Runner-up
Ernar Armandiq	Safe	Safe	Advanced	Third Place
Arujan Aydarbek	Safe	Safe	Advanced	Fourth Place
Beksultan Kenişqalïev	Safe	Safe	Eliminated	Eliminated (Week 3)
Raxman Sätïev	Safe	Safe	Eliminated	Eliminated (Week 3)
Danïyar Kärim	Safe	Safe	Eliminated	Eliminated (Week 3)
Venera Ismagilova	Safe	Safe	Eliminated	Eliminated (Week 3)
Ayan Bayjigit	Safe	Eliminated	Eliminated (Week 2)	
Murat Dalexan	Safe	Eliminated	Eliminated (Week 2)	
Anna Uvarova	Safe	Eliminated	Eliminated (Week 2)	
Tatya Kobaladze	Safe	Eliminated	Eliminated (Week 2)	
Nurjigit Subanqulov	Eliminated	Eliminated (Week 1)		
Ardaq Tölepbergen	Eliminated	Eliminated (Week 1)		
Janïya Qarabatır	Eliminated	Eliminated (Week 1)		
Aydana Nawkeeva	Eliminated	Eliminated (Week 1)		
