= Kelin (film) =

Kazakhstani film

Kelin (Cyrillic: Келін, Russian: Невестка, romanized: Nevestka, lit. 'The Bride') is a Kazakh film released in 2009.

Ermek Tursunov is the director of movie. Gulsharat Zhubyeva, Turakhan Sadykova and Erzhan Nurymbet play the leading roles. It was selected as the Kazakhstani entry for the Best Foreign Language Film at the 82nd Academy Awards, making the January shortlist.

== Filming technique ==
No speech was used in the movie. No subtitles are needed to watch. Throughout the film, only the sounds of nature are heard. Human voices also appear as a natural element in only a few places (such as shouting, groaning).

== Plot ==
The movie tells the story of an anonymous bride who is married against her will to a shepherd. Her true love, Mergen, is not strong enough to take her. Mergen swears that he will win back the girl he loves. Meanwhile, the new bride migrates to her husband's dormitory, where they will live with her mother-in-law. The old woman has absolute dominance over everyone in the house. The bride begins to enjoy the sexual life with her husband over time. But things get complicated when her old love returns to pick her up after a while. Because the bride is used to her new family. Mergen watches the family from afar and begins to look for opportunities.

The story told takes place in the Altai mountains between the second century and the fourth century. In the film, there are practices related to the old Turkic shamanism.

== See also ==
- List of submissions to the 82nd Academy Awards for Best Foreign Language Film
- List of Kazakhstani submissions for the Academy Award for Best Foreign Language Film

== Bibliography ==
- Kelin (The Daughter-in-Law), Mike Goodridge, 8 October 2009, Screendaily
- Kelin — Film Review, Natasha Senjanovic (AP), 24 June 2009, The Hollywood Reporter
