= Why the Swallow Has the Tail with Little Horns =

1967 Kazakh animated film

Why the Swallow's Tail is Forked
- Directed by: Amen Khaydarov
- Written by: Galina Dusenko
- Starring: Z. Sharipova
- Cinematography: S. Artemov
- Production company: Kazakhfilm
- Release date: 1967 (USSR)
- Running time: 10 minutes
- Country: Soviet Union

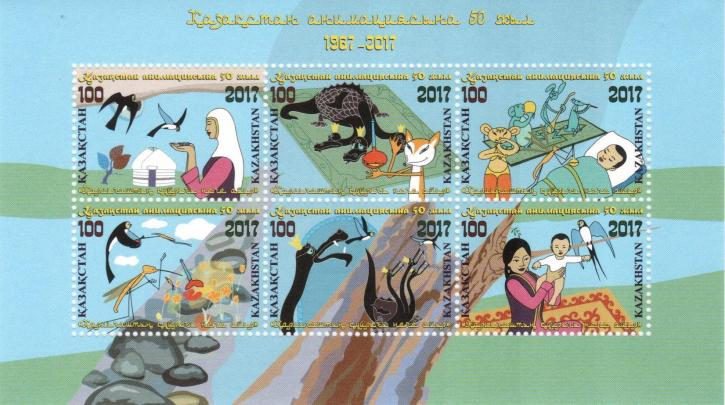
Why the Swallow has the Tail with Llttle Horns stamp collection, 2017

Why the Swallow's Tail is Forked (Kazakh: Қарлығаштың құйрығы неге айыр? Russian: Почему́ у ла́сточки хво́стик ро́жками; tr.:Pochemu u lastochki khvostik rozhkami) is the first animated short film made in the Kazakh SSR. It was directed by Amen Khaydarov and released in 1967.

== Plot ==
The film is based upon the traditional Kazakh fairy tale of the same name but with the notable addition of the villain being a dying three-headed dragon searching to regain his youth instead of a snake.

== Creators ==
	English	Russian
Director	Amen Khaydarov	Амен Хайдаров
Art Director	Amen Khaydarov	Амен Хайдаров
Artists	V. Shchukin; E. Beyseitov	В. Щукин; Э. Бейсеитов
Animators	E. Beyseitov; B. Kalistratov; Galina Dusenko; E. Sultanbekov; F. Mukanov; Viktor Chuchunov	Э. Бейсеитов; Б. Калистратов; Галина Дусенко; Е. Султанбеков; Ф. Муканов; Виктор Чугунов
Camera	S. Artemov	С. Артемов
Composer	Nurgis Tlendiyev	Нургис Тлендиев
Sound operators	U. Davletgaliyev; Yevangelina Dodonova	У. Давлетгалиев, Евангелина Додонова
Voice	Z. Sharipova	З. Шарипова
Text author	Galina Dusenko	Галина Дусенко

== Reception ==
The film was warmly received both by audiences and by professional masters of Soviet animation. It was accepted to a number of domestic and international film festivals, winning a prize at the 1968 All-Union Film Festival and the bronze medal in the children's films category at the 1974 New York Animation Festival. This success was especially noteworthy because the artistic group which worked on the film were not experienced in animation, being recent graduates of the Almaty Art College.

The artistic style of the film also received praise. In the words of Professor Baurzhan Nugerbekov: "The drawings and colours of the film are clear continuations of the smooth, flat designs of the Kazakh ornamental arts; of the clear and colourful compositions on artistic felts".

The film represents a distinct popular pastoral vision of Kazakh national identity through its culmination of visual motifs during a time of heightened national awareness within the Soviet Union. It also offers an allegorical interpretation in the dying three-headed dragon king as a stand-in for the perceived declining Soviet Union under the new leadership of Leonid Brezhnev, following Nikita Khruschev's open criticism of Joseph Stalin.

== See also ==
- History of Russian animation
