= Shaken Aimanov =

Kazakh film director (1914–1970)

Shaken Kenzhetaiuly Aimanov
- Шәкен Кенжетайұлы Айманов
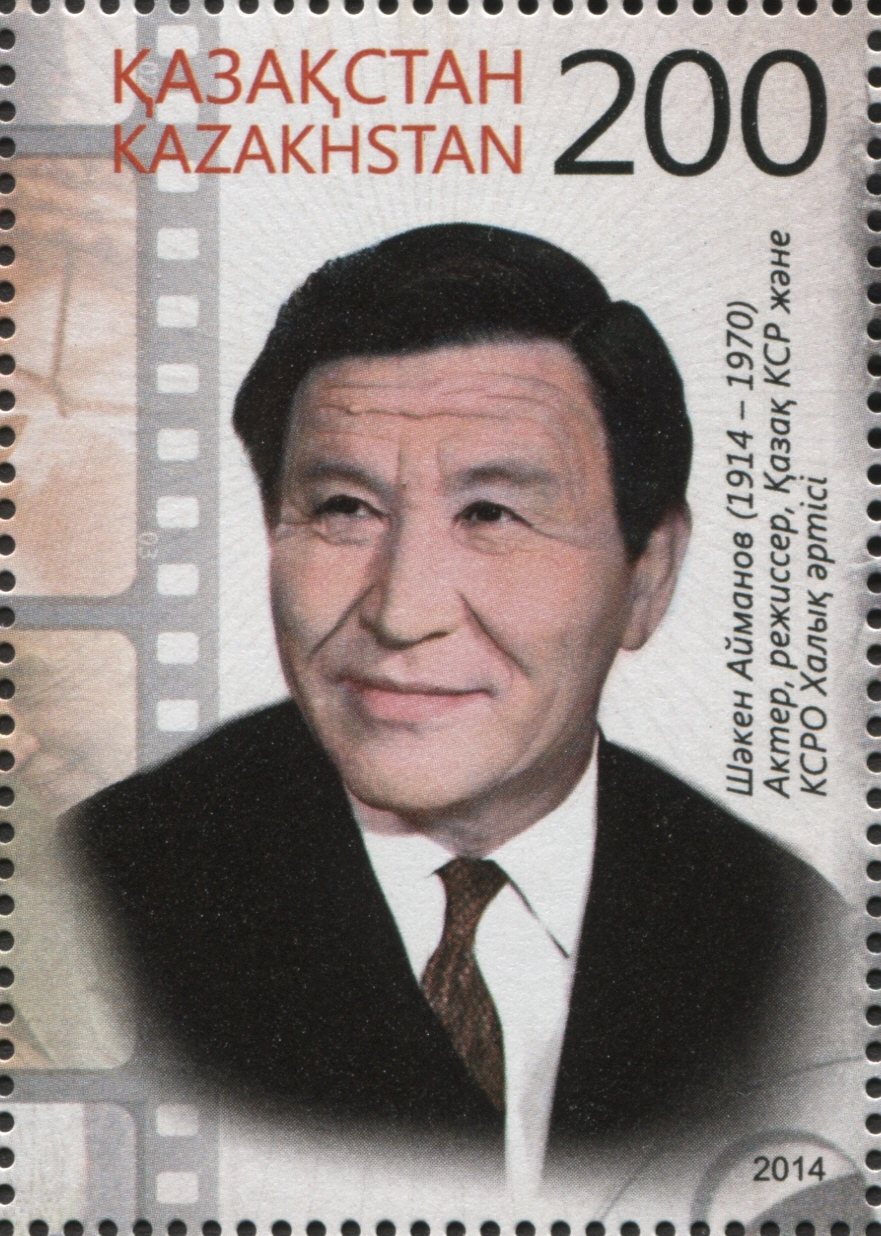
- Aimanov on a 2014 stamp of Kazakhstan
- Born: Shahkarim Kenzhetaiuly Aimanov; 15 February 1914; Bayanaul, Russian Empire (present-day Kazakhstan)
- Died: 23 December 1970 (aged 56); Moscow, Russian SFSR, Soviet Union
- Occupations: Actor, film director
- Years active: 1954 – 1970

Shahkarim Kenzhetaiuly Aimanov (Note: Kazakh: Шаһкерім Кенжетайұлы Айманов, romanized: Shahkerim Kenzhetayuly Aymanov) (15 October 1914 – 23 December 1970, known by the diminutive Shaken) (Note: Kazakh: Шәкен, romanized: Shäken) was a Kazakh Soviet actor and film director. He is considered to be the father of Kazakh cinematography, as well as an iconic film director and actor. He directed eleven films between 1954 and 1970.

== Biography ==
Aimanov was born in Bayanaul, Russian Empire (now Kazakhstan) in 1914. He studied at the Kazakh Institute of Education in Semipalatinsk (now Semey) from 1931 to 1933.

He began his acting career at the Kazakh Theater of Drama in Alma-Ata in 1933. Vivid social and psychological characteristics are inherent in his art. His best roles included Akhan Seri in Akhan Seri and Aktokty by Gabit Musirepov, Isatai in Isatai and Makhambet by Akhinzhanov, Kobylandy Batyr in Kobylandy by Mukhtar Auezov, Kodar in Kozy Korpesh and Bayan Sulu by Gabit Musirepov, Petruchio in The Taming of the Shrew by William Shakespeare, and Tikhon in The Storm by Alexander Ostrovsky. He also worked as a director and from 1947 to 1951 was chief director at the Kazakh Theater of Drama. Working in films since 1940, as both an actor and a director, Aimanov played Zhambyl in the film of the same name and directed the 1958 film Our Dear Doctor, among others. He was a deputy of the fourth and seventh convocations of the Supreme Soviet of the Kazakh SSR. In 1963, he was a member of the jury at the 3rd Moscow International Film Festival. In 1952, he received the Stalin Prize for his work in the theater, and in 1968 he received the State Prize of the Kazakh SSR. He has been awarded the Order of Lenin and the Order of the Red Banner of Labour.

The Kazakhfilm, where Aimanov worked as a film director, was named after him in 1984. The Shaken's Stars International Film Festival was held in 2013 to support and help young artists and filmmakers.

== Filmography (director) ==
- Poema o lyubvi (1954)
- Doch stepey (1954)
- My zdes zhivyom (1956)
- Nash milyy doktor (1957)
- V odnom rayone (1960)
- Pesnya zovet (1961)
- Perekrestok (1962)
- Bezborodyi obmanshchik (1964)
- Zemlya ottsov (1966)
- Angel v tyubeteyke (1968)
- Konets atamana (1970)
