= The Plague at the Karatas Village =

- Directed by: Adilkhan Yerzhanov
- Written by: Adilkhan Yerzhanov
- Produced by: Serik Abishev; Olga Khlasheva
- Starring: Aibek Kudabayev; Tolganay Talgat
- Release date: January 31, 2016 (International Film Festival Rotterdam)
- Running time: 86 min.
- Country: Kazakhstan
- Languages: Russian, Kazakh

The Plague at the Karatas Village (Russian: Чума в ауле Каратас) is a 2016 Kazakh film directed by Adilkhan Yerzhanov. The film is part of the Kazakh Partisan Cinema, a guerrilla filmmaking movement that aims to work without any governmental interference.

== Plot ==
A new mayor arrives in a small Kazakh village and finds out there is a mysterious plague infecting the villagers, while locals insist it's only a flu.

== Cast ==
- Aibek Kudabayev
- Tolganay Talgat
- Nurbek Mukushev
- Konstantin Kozlov
- Baimurat Zhumanov
- Yerbolat Yerzhanov
- Ademoka

== See also ==
- Cinema of Kazakhstan
- Guerrilla filmmaking
