= Kazakh Khanate – Golden Throne =

2019 film

- Film poster
- Directed by: Rustem Abdrashev
- Starring: Yerkebulan Daiyrov
- Release date: 21 March 2019
- Country: Kazakhstan
- Language: Kazakh

Kazakh Khanate – Golden Throne is a 2019 Kazakhstani drama film directed by Rustem Abdrashev. It was selected as the Kazakhstani entry for the Best International Feature Film at the 92nd Academy Awards, but it was not nominated. The film is the second in a series, which was launched with Diamond Sword in 2017.

== Plot ==
The film is set in the fifteenth century and depicts the events surrounding the establishment of the Kazakh Khanate. It follows the struggle of Kerei and Zhanibek, descendants of Genghis Khan, against Abulkhair Khan and his descendants for control of the steppe territories.

After leaving the rule of Abulkhair, Kerei Khan and Janibek Khan lead a group of nomadic tribes from the Dasht-i Qipchaq to Moghulistan, where they seek to establish an independent state. Their efforts lead to the formation of the Kazakh Khanate, while their enemies attempt to prevent the new state from consolidating its power.

== Cast ==
- Yerkebulan Daiyrov
- Khulan Chuluun
- Igilik Naryn
- Zarina Yeva
- Yerlan Amina

== See also ==
- List of submissions to the 92nd Academy Awards for Best International Feature Film
- List of Kazakhstani submissions for the Academy Award for Best International Feature Film
