= Ermek Tursunov =

Kazakh screenwriter and film director

- Ермек Тұрсынов
- Born: 20 July 1961 (age 65); Narynkol, Raiymbek District, Almaty Region, Kazakh SSR, Soviet Union
- Occupations: Film director; screenwriter; writer
- Awards: Honored worker of Kazakhstan

Ermek Kärımjanūly Tūrsynov (Kazakh: Ермек Кәрімжанұлы Тұрсынов, born 20 July 1961) is a Kazakh writer and screenwriter, one of the best Asian Film director according to Asia Pacific Screen Awards, master of sport, international class in futsal.

== Biography ==
Tursunov was born in the settlement of Narynkol, Almaty Region, on 20 July 1961. He joined a sports school at the age of 5. Ermek continued his sports career at university playing professional futsal. As a member of Kazakhstan's national futsal team, Ermek took part in the 2000 World Cup in Guatemala.

He is a graduate Al-Farabi Kazakh National University (Dept. Of Journalism, 1984) and All-Russian State Institute of Cinematography (Screenwriting and Film Studies Dept., 1990).

In 1991, Ermek participated in Nevada-Semey movement Anti-nuclear movement in Kazakhstan, and as an NGO member spent 4 years studying in the USA. Later he worked as the CEO of the national broadcasting corporation Qazaqstan and Executive Producer of Channel 31 TV and radio broadcasting company.

Kelin was Ermek's debut as a director in 2008. This work was shortlisted for Oscar as the Best Foreign Language Film.

2012 saw his movie The Old Man (Shal), inspired by Hemingway's The Old Man and the Sea. It collected numerous rewards, including Kulager, Kazakhstani national movie award, as the best movie of the year (2012); it was nominated for the Nika Award for the Best CIS and Baltic Movie in 2014.

Stranger (Zhat) became another major movie in Tursunov's career as a screen director. Kazakhstan nominated it for an Oscar and Asia Pacific Screen Awards (Achievement in Directing); it received NETPAC award in the 19th Black Nights Festival in Tallinn.

Ermek Tursunov was elected Chairman of the Kazakhstani Union of Filmmakers in 2018.

== Filmography ==
| Year | Title | Original title | | | |
| Year | Title | Original title | Director | Screenwriter | Notes |
|---|---|---|---|---|---|
| 2008 | Kelin | Келін | ✓ | ✓ | |
| 2011 | Seven Days in May | Мамырдың жеті күні | ✓ | ✓ | |
| 2012 | The Old Man | Шал | ✓ | ✓ | |
| 2014 | Old Woman | Кемпір | ✓ | ✓ | |
| 2015 | Little Brother | Кенже | ✓ | | |
| 2015 | Stranger | Жат | ✓ | ✓ | |
| 2018 | The Guardian of the Light | Шырақшы | ✓ | ✓ | |

== Bibliography ==
Tursunov wrote Mameluke, Seven Days in May, The Little Things in Life, Once Upon a Time.

== Awards ==
He was awarded the title of Honored Worker of Kazakhstan in 2016, on the 25th anniversary of the country's independence.
