= Strayed (2009 film) =

- Directed by: Akan Satayev
- Written by: Timur Zhaxylykov
- Produced by: Akan Satayev
- Starring: Andrey Merzlikin
- Cinematography: Khasan Kydyraliev
- Edited by: Sergey Berdyugin
- Music by: Renat Gaissin
- Release date: 1 September 2009 (WFF)
- Running time: 94 minutes
- Country: Kazakhstan
- Language: Russian

Strayed (Russian: Заблудившийся) is a 2009 Kazakhstani thriller directed by Akan Satayev. The film was selected as the Kazakhstani entry for the Best Foreign Language Film at the 83rd Academy Awards, but it didn't make the final shortlist.

== Plot ==
A man (Andrey Merzlikin) traveling with his wife (Almagul Rulas) and son (Ilyas Sadyrov) to town takes a short cut across the steppes. The car breaks down in the middle of nowhere and in the morning he finds that his wife and son are gone. While looking for them he discovers a strange shack where an older man and his daughter live. This strange pair seem to have plans for him, but it is unclear what those plans might entail. As he discovers there is no escape from this place, he also gets closer to solving the mystery of what happened to his family, and who this strange man and woman really are.

== Cast ==
- Andrey Merzlikin – Man
- Tungishbay Al-Tarazi – Old man
- Aiganym Sadykova – Girl
- Almagul Rulas – Wife
- Ilyas Sadyrov – Son

== See also ==
- List of submissions to the 83rd Academy Awards for Best Foreign Language Film
- List of Kazakhstani submissions for the Academy Award for Best Foreign Language Film
