= Berik Aitzhanov =

Kazakh actor

- Берік Айтжанов
- Born: 11 March 1979 (age 46); Kyzyl-Orda Region, Kazakh SSR, Soviet Union
- Occupation: Actor
- Years active: 2000–present
- Honours: Honored Worker of Kazakhstan

Berik Aitzhanov (Kazakh: Берік Бөшенұлы Айтжанов, romanized: Berık Böşenūly Aitjanov) is a Kazakh actor and film producer. He was named Best Actor in 2011 for his performance in The Liquidator and Returning to the A, which was selected as Kazakhstan's entry for Best Foreign Language Film at the 84th Academy Awards.

== Background ==
Aitzhanov was born in Kzyl-Orda, and raised in Alamin. His father is a police officer and mother is an educator in kindergarten.

== Career ==
Aitzhanov's career began with theater roles. His debut role was a production of William Shakespeare's Hamlet, in which he played Laertes, the son of Polonius. Aitzhanov made his big screen breakthrough in 2005, when he took a part in Rymbek Alpiyev's Wolf Hour. Later in 2005, Aitzhanov starred in Zastava and Mahambet followed by Mustafa Shokai, which was filmed in Prague. In 2008, Aitzhanov starred in Brothers, a TV series created and directed by Akan Satayev. Aitzhanov continued his collaboration with Satayev in 2010 action-drama film The Liquidator, co-starring Vinnie Jones and Karlygash Muhammedzhanova.
