= Azamat Satybaldy =

Kazakh actor

- Азамат Сатыбалды
- Born: 2 November 1977 (age 48); Jambyl Region, Kazakh SSR, USSR
- Occupations: Cinema actor; theater actor; television presenter; producer
- Years active: 2001–present
- Spouse: Nazgul Karabalina
- Children: 1
- Awards: Order of Kurmet

Azamat Satybaldy (Kazakh: Азамат Сатыбалды; born 2 November 1977) is a Kazakh actor of drama theater, cinema, producer, and television presenter. He is an Honored Artist of Kazakhstan (2014). He is also the Dean of Zhurgenov Kazakh National Academy of Arts (since 14 February 2022).

== Biography ==
Satybaldy was born in the settlement of Lugovoye, Jambyl Region, on 2 November 1977.

In 1997, Azamat moved to Almaty to study at Zhurgenov Academy of Arts, and in 2000 he was sent to Kostanay Regional Drama Theater named after Omarov to finish his thesis. Having received his diploma in 2001, he joined Kazakh State Academic Drama Theater named after M.O. Auezov.

Nearly 20 years after his debut at the main stage, Azamat was appointed Director of Musrepov Kazakh State Academic Theater for Children and Young Adults. In 2017, Azamat established his own theater company and filmmaking studio named "28 Theatre" and "Cinema 28" respectively. Mr. Satybaldy was appointed Dean of Zhurgenov Kazakh National Academy of Arts in February 2022.

From July 2023 to July 2024, he was the President of Kazakhfilm JSC.

== Filmography ==
Year	Title	Role	Notes
2001—2003	Locust (TV series, Kazakhstan)	Erlan	
2011	Doctor Akhmetova is coming to you	doctor Rinat	
2012	Bir Kem Dunie	Kairat	
2012	Odnoklassniki (TV series, Kazakhstan)	Daulet Egorov (main role)	
2012	Counter Check	Daulet	
2012	Paryz (series, Kazakhstan)	Narthai (main role)	
2014	Kara Shanyrak (TV series, Kazakhstan)	Alisher (main role)	
2015	Racketeer 2	Kasym	
2016	The Road to Mother	Hamite	
2017	For you	Askar	
2019	Tomiris	Kavaz	

== Personal life ==
Azamat's wife, Nazgul Adietovna Karabalina (born 1977) is a Kazakh stage actress and producer, and a laureate of the Daryn State Award. They have a son named Sultan.

== Awards ==
- 2014 – Honored Artist of Kazakhstan
- 2016 – 25 Years of Independence of the Republic of Kazakhstan Medal
- 2021— Order of Kurmet
