= Tolkyn Zabirova =

Kazakhstani singer

Tolkyn Zabirova (Kazakh: Толқын Қалиқызы Забирова, Tolqyn Qaliqyzy Zabirova; born 17 October 1970 in Ayagoz) is a singer from Ayagoz, Kazakhstan. Most of her songs are in Kazakh or Russian, though several exist in other languages.
