= Amanat Ali =

Amanat Ali may refer to the following people:

- Amanat Ali Khan (1922–1974), Pakistani classical vocalist and ghazal singer, from the Patiala gharana
- Asad Amanat Ali Khan (1955–2007), Pakistani classical, semi-classical and ghazal singer, from the Patiala gharana
- Shafqat Amanat Ali (born 1965), Pakistani classical vocalist and playback singer, from the Patiala gharana
- Amanat Ali (singer) (born 1987), Pakistani singer
