= Amanat (surname) =

Amanat is a surname. Notable people with the surname include:

- Abbas Amanat (born 1947), Iranian-American historian
- Agha Hasan Amanat (1815–1858), Urdu poet, writer and playwright
- Hossein Amanat (born 1942), Iranian-Canadian architect
- Omar Amanat (born 1972), American businessman
- Shafqat Amanat Ali (born 1965), Pakistani classical singer
- Sana Amanat, American comic book creator and editor
