= The Wild East =

1993 film

Dikiy vostok
- Directed by: Rashid Nugmanov
- Written by: Rashid Nugmanov
- Produced by: Murat Nugmanov; Rashid Nugmanov
- Starring: Aleksandr Aksyonov; Farkhad Amankulov; Konstantin Fyodorov; Zhanna Isina; Viacheslav Knizel; Konstantin Shamshurin; Gennadi Shatunov; Pavel Shpakovsky; Aleksandr Sporykhin
- Cinematography: Murat Nugmanov
- Edited by: Khadisha Urmurzina
- Music by: Aleksandr Aksyonov
- Release date: 1993 (Kazakhstan)
- Running time: 98 min
- Country: Kazakhstan
- Language: Russian

The Wild East (Russian: Дикий восток, Dikiy vostok, Dikij vostok) is a Russian-language film created in Kazakhstan shortly after the dissolution of the Soviet Union released in 1993. It was written and directed by Rashid Nugmanov and was inspired by The Magnificent Seven, an American remake of Akira Kurosawa's film Seven Samurai.

== Plot ==
In this version of the famous plot a group of midget circus runaways decide to form their own community to flee the chaos out come under attack from motorcycling ruffians. In response, of course, midgets hire seven tough people to defend them. One of them is a woman driving a car, another a stunt man, another a Mongolian eagle hunter, and a beatnik. The bandits have an easy victory and allow the hired fighters to leave with their weapons. However, they come back, teach the midgets to fight and entrap the bandits. In a final fight, the chief of the fighters confronts the main bandit at their lair and wins. The bandits return the stolen car to the fighter. The midgets exchange the car for a tractor following the final wish of the driver.

The film was shown in many international film festivals as both a fun movie and an oddity. It was billed as "The Last Soviet Film."

== Cast ==
- Aleksandr Aksyonov, Beatnik, a drunkard.
- Farkhad Amankulov, Mongol, a hunter.
- Konstantin Fyodorov, Strannik.
- Zhanna Isina, Marilyn, a car driver.
- Viacheslav Knizel, Skull, bandit chief.
- Konstantin Shamshurin, Godfather
- Gennadi Shatunov, Iona, a midget unhappy with his sort.
- Pavel Shpakovsky, Old Man, midget chief.
- Aleksandr Sporykhin, Ivan Taiga, a former soldier.

== Quotes ==
A notable quote is when the midget patriarch says "remember there is no sex in our country." The phrase is a hint to the catch phrase "There is no sex in the USSR" from a famous episode from the perestroika-era TV show US-Soviet Space Bridge.
