= Honored Worker of Kazakhstan =

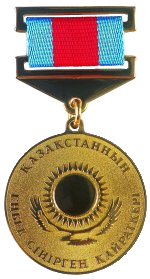
- Type: Badge of honor
- Awarded for: To prominent state and public figures, representatives of science, culture, art, industry and social sphere for great services to the republic
- Presented by: Kazakhstan
- Eligibility: Kazakh and foreign citizens
- Status: active
- Established: December 12, 1995
- Ribbon of the order

Honorary title of the Republic of Kazakhstan The Honored Worker of Kazakhstan (Kazakh: Қазақстанның еңбек сіңірген қайраткері, romanized: Qazaqstannyñ eñbek sıñırgen qairatkerı) was established pursuant to Law No.2676 On National Awards of the Republic of Kazakhstan dated Dec 12, 1995.

The honorary title is awarded for great service to the republic to prominent state and public figures, academics, artists and representatives of industry, cultural and social spheres.

The decoration set consists of a badge and a standardized ID card.

== Decoration description ==
The badge is a circular ridged brass medal. Soaring sunlit eagle, an element of Kazakhstani national flag, adorns the center of the obverse. Words along the rim read "ҚАЗАҚСТАННЫҢ" at the top and "ЕҢБЕК СІҢІРГЕН ҚАЙРАТКЕРІ" at the bottom.

The reverse side is smooth and matte.

The badge is connected to a grooved pentagonal top bar with a suspension and an oval suspension ring. Slits run along the bottom of the top bar, its center is adorned with a blue and red silk moire ribbon. The top bar has a brooch to attach the medal.
