= Akan Satayev =

Kazakh filmmaker and actor

- Ақан Сатаев
- Born: December 23, 1971 (age 54); Karaganda, Karaganda Region, Kazakh SSR, Soviet Union
- Occupations: film director; film producer; actor
- Awards: Honored Worker of Kazakhstan

Aqan Qarğambaiūly Sataev (Kazakh: Ақан Қарғамбайұлы Сатаев, born December 23, 1971) is a Kazakh film director, actor, screenwriter and producer. Satayev is named Honored Worker of Kazakhstan and is the laureate of State Award of Kazakhstan.

== Biography ==
Satayev was born to a family of actors, both his parents were recognized as People's Artistes of the Kazakh SSR and performed leading roles at Karaganda Drama Theater where he spent a lot of time. That theater became his first drama school, and in 1994 Satayev graduated from Kazakh National Academy of Arts, Department of Cinema and Television.

While at university, Satayev played student Azat, the main character in Allazhar, a movie by Kaldybay Abenov about tragic events in Alma-Ata in December 1986. After graduation, Satayev took part in various feature films and went into directing and producing advertising clips. Sataifilm, the company he founded in 2003, presented Racketeer, a crime drama and his debut movie, in 2007.

In 2016, Satayev founded the Astana Film Fund to support young Kazakh directors and low-budget indie productions en masse. In the same year he shot 2 feature-length movies, Districts, a teenage crime drama set in the USSR, and The Road to Mother, a period drama about the Soviet collectivization period, the Eastern Front, and the Kazakh post-war years.

Satayev led Kazakhfilm, the largest movie studio in Kazakhstan from 2020 to 2022.

== Filmography ==
Year	Title	Original title					
Year	Title	Original title	Director	Producer	Screenwriter	Actor	Notes
2008	Allazhar	Аллажар				✓	Student Azat (main role)
2007	Racketeer	Рэкетир	✓	✓		✓	Referee
2009	Strayed	Адасқан	✓	✓			
2009	Brothers	Ағайынды	✓				
2011	Liquidator	Ликвидатор	✓				
2011	My Darling (series)	Айналайын		✓			
2012	Myn Bala	Жаужүрек мың бала	✓				
2013	Bauyrzhan Momyshuly (TV series)	Бауыржан Момышұлы	✓				
2015	Racketeer 2	Рэкетир 2	✓				
2015	Hacker	Хакер	✓		✓		
2016	The Road to Mother	Анаға апарар жол	✓				
2016	Districts	Районы	✓				
2018	Businessmen	Бизнесменыдер	✓				
2019	Tomiris	Томирис	✓				
2021	Boxer	Боксер	✓				
2022	Dawn of the Great Steppe	Ұлы Дала Таңы	✓				

== Awards ==
- Honored Worker of Kazakhstan title conferred by a Presidential decree
- Laureate of the State Award of the Republic of Kazakhstan for Literature and Arts
