= Kazakhfilm =

Kazakh film studio

- Type: Joint-stock company
- Industry: Film
- Founded: 1934 (studio of a newsreel); September 12, 1941 (films studio)
- Founder: Council of Ministers of the Kazakh SSR
- Headquarters: Al-Farabi ave., 176, Almaty, Kazakhstan
- Key people: Azamat Satybaldy - President
- Products: Motion pictures, television films, animated films
- Website: kazakhfilmstudios.kz

Kazakhfilm (Kazakh: Қазақфильм, Qazaqfilm, pronounced [qɑzɑqfilm]) is a Kazakh film studio located in Almaty, Kazakhstan. It is one of the oldest film studios in Kazakhstan.

== History ==
The film studio was founded in 1934 as the Alma-Ata newsreel studio, in 1936 the first documentaries were released. On November 15, 1941, the Alma-Ata film studio merged with the Mosfilm and Lenfilm film studios evacuated to Kazakhstan to the Central United Film Studio - TsOKS, which worked in Alma-Ata until 1944 and produced 80% of all domestic feature films during the war. On January 9, 1960, from the Alma-Ata film studio of feature and newsreel films, it was renamed into the Kazakhfilm film studio. In 1984 the film studio was named after the outstanding figure of national cinematography Shaken Kenzhetayevich Aimanov.

In 2005, Kazakhfilm launched its first big production, Nomad, which involved investments in technology and talent amounting to $37 million. This boosted the domestic film industry. Nomad was followed by Mongol, (2007) another big-budget epic.

In 2020, the film studio appeared on the seventh episode of The Amazing Race 32 as the site of a Detour task.

The newest project of Kazakhfilm is the film named Томирис (Tomiris) based on the life of the Scythian Queen Tomyris directed by Akan Satayev in 2019. This movie received international attention.

In April 2021 JSC Kazakhfilm named after I. Sh. Aimanova, together with Almaty Management University AlmaU, established the Media & Film School, a new format for media and cinema. The goal of the new school is to train professionals who meet the modern requirements of the media and film market and the development of the creative industry in the country. The training of the first students began in the 2021-2022 academic year.

== Structure ==
The Kazakhfilm film studio consists of:

=== Territory ===
On an area of 16.5 hectares there are pavilions for filming, decorative and technical buildings, studios, production and laboratory building. All the workshops and technological areas necessary for film production are located in three specialized buildings.

=== Filming pavilions ===
The building of the two-pavilion block has two film pavilions with an area of 735 m² each; the pavilions are 8.2 m high and 5.2 m usable height. It is possible to shoot without using camera rails. Full soundproofing for synchronous recording of "clean sound". Capability to use lighting equipment on the 4th floor. Availability of a filming pit (for the pool, basement and more). The possibility of filming live props (sheep, horses, etc.), game vehicles.

=== Production and laboratory building ===
The production and laboratory building has a total area of 9113.2 m², built in 1984. It contains a film processing laboratory and a copying department for developing and printing materials and copies of films.

=== Thonestudio ===
The tonstudio has an area of 5967.4 m² and was built in 1978. The big hall of the tonatelier is built according to the "box-in-a-box" principle with an independent foundation. The hall has variable acoustics. The building also includes a music recording studio, a big recording studio for big bands (up to 50 instruments at a time) and phonograms re-recording, a mastering room, rooms for phonograms editing, screening rooms, rooms for films editing, a video editing complex. The building also houses the administration of the Kazakhfilm studio. The studio is equipped with Dolby Stereo sound recording equipment on the set.

=== Filming preparation workshop ===
The studio has a workshop for the preparation of filming, which has areas for the production of various game props, sewing costumes, and texturing materials. A large number of various props and costumes are stored in the warehouses of this shop (more than 25 thousand storage units). Making scenery is engaged in the department of decorative and technical facilities, which consists of a props area, woodworking, locksmith's area.

In addition to the main buildings there are the following facilities:

- A film repository with a total area of 413.7 square meters was built in 1989. This building in special rooms stores the following: sets of source materials of films, collection of feature and documentary films made by the "Kazakhfilm" studio, as well as newsreels and newsreels.
- Motor transport shop
- Airplane-based wind generator

== Owners and cost of the studio ==
Since its inception, the studio has been under the control of the central government authorities. In 1963, the studio was owned and managed by the Kazakh SSR's State Committee on Cinematography under the Council of Ministers (Goskino Kazakh SSR). In 1996, due to the liquidation of Goskino Kazakh SSR, the State Company Kazakhkino under the Cabinet of Ministers (since 1997 under the Ministry of Culture of the Republic of Kazakhstan) became the owner and manager of the film studio. In 2000, the "Kazakh film factory named after Shaken Aimanov", the National Production Center of Kazakhstan, Kazkino-Production (Kazakhkino) and Gosfilmofond were reorganized by merging into the Republican State Enterprise - the Republican State Enterprise National Company "Kazakhfilm" named after Shaken Aimanov under the Ministry of Culture of the Republic of Kazakhstan.

As of May 2021, 100% of the shares are owned by the state in the person of the Ministry of Culture of the Republic of Kazakhstan. In accordance with a comprehensive privatization plan in 2014-2015, 49% of the shares were going to be sold into private hands through direct targeted sales. The total value of the Kazakhfilm film studio was estimated at 3,398,529,000 tenge ($18,370,427), the share of 49 percent put up for sale was estimated at 1,665,279,210 tenge ($9,001,509). As a result of public and cultural protests, the government refused to privatize the film studio.

== Productions ==
=== Filmography ===
See Category:Kazakhfilm films

The company has made films since 1961.

1. Tomiris (2019)
2. Mongol (2007)
3. Nomad (2005)
4. Ironiya lyubvi (2010)
5. Rebirth Island (2004)
6. Ompa (1998)
7. The Asian (1991)
8. Gibel Otrara (1991)
9. The Last Stop (1990)
10. Vlyublyonnaya rybka (1990) (TV)
11. Ainalaiyn (1990)
12. Gamlet iz Suzaka, ili Mamaya Kero (1990)
13. Revenge (1989)
14. Manchzhurskiy variant (1989)
15. Prikosnoveniye (1989)
16. Woman of the Day (1989)
17. The Needle (1988)
18. Balkon (1988)
19. Desant (1988)
20. Troye (1988)
21. Voin (1988)
22. Vyshe gor (1988)
23. Neprofessionaly (1987)
24. Snaypery (1987)
25. Iskusstvo byt smirnym (1987)
26. Kto ty, vsadnik? (1987)
27. Skazka o prekrasnoy Aysulu (1987)
28. Vyyti iz lesa na polyanu (1987)
29. My Home on the Green Hills (1986)
30. Wild Pigeon (1986)
31. Boysya, vrag, devyatogo syna (1986)
32. The Victims Have No Grievance (1986)
33. Tayny madam Vong (1986)
34. Troynoy pryzhok Pantery (1986)
35. Turksib (1986)
36. The Cheetah Comes Back (1985) (TV)
37. Leti, zhuravlik (1985)
38. Sestra moya, Lyusya (1985) (TV)
39. Znay nashikh! (1985)
40. Chelovecheskiy faktor (1984)
41. Primite Adama! (1984)
42. Sladkiy sok vnutri travy (1984)
43. Voskresnye progulki (1984)
44. God drakona (1983)
45. Sultan Beybars (1982)
46. Trizna (1982)
47. Falconer (1980) (TV)
48. Gontsy speshat (1980)
49. Kogda tebe dvenadzat let (1979)
50. Pogonya v stepi (1979) Vkus khleba (1979)
51. Transsibirskiy ekspress (1978) (TV)
52. Leto v zooparke (1977)
53. Moya lyubov na tretyem kurse (1976)
54. Pritcha o lyubvi (1976)
55. Gaukhartas (Hrani Svoyu Zvezdu) (1975)
56. The Fierce One (1974)
57. Pesn o Manshuk (1974)
58. Konets atamana (1973)
59. Shok and Sher (1972)
60. Kyz-Zhibek (1970)
61. Doroga v tysyachu verst (1968)
62. Za nami Moskva (1968)
63. Zvuchi tam-tam! (1968)
64. Tam, gde tsvetut edelveysy (1966)
65. Zemlya ottsov (1966)
66. My Name is Qoja (1964)
67. Perekrestok (1963)
68. Pesnya zovet (1961)

=== Cartoons ===
A list of cartoons made by the studio.

1. Pochemu u Lastochki Hvostik Rozhkami (Why the Swallow Has the Tail with Little Horns) - 1967
2. Aksak-Kulan - 1968
3. Hvostik (The Little Tail) - 1969
4. Medved' i Zayac (The Bear and the Hare) - 1969
5. Prevraschenie (The Transmutation) - 1969
6. Kausar-Bulak (Klad) (Kausar-Bulak) - 1970
7. Sbornik Mikromul'fil'mov N 1 (The Collection Of Micro Cartoons) - 1970
8. Shramy Starogo Erkena (The Scars of Old Erken) - 1970
9. Zhavoronok (The Skylark) - 1970
10. Golubaya Planeta (The Blue Planet) - 1971
11. Hodzha-Nasyr - Stroitel' (Hodga-Nasir - The Builder) - 1971
12. Lyubitel' Odinochestva (Solitude-Lover) - 1971
13. Svyatoj Osel (The Saint Donkey) - 1971
14. Tri Zhelaniya (Three Wishes) - 1971
15. Tri Tankista (Soldatskaya Skazka) (Three Tankmen) - 1972
16. Goluboj Kon' (The Blue Horse) - 1973
17. Hodzha-Nasyr - Bogohul'nik (Prozrenie) (Hodga-Nasir - The Blasphemer) - 1973
18. Mal'chik-Oduvanchik (Boy-Dandelion) - 1973
19. Volshebnaya Svirel' (Auen) (The Big Reed-Pipe) - 1973
20. Derzhis', Rebyata! (Steady, Boys) - 1974
21. Muzbalak - 2018

== Management ==
- 1953-1970 - Shaken Aimanov, art director, head of "Kazakhfilm" film studio.
- From 1978 - Azerbazhan Mambetov, director of "Kazakhfilm" film studio.
- From 1992 - Ardak Amirkulov, director of "Kazakhfilm" film studio.
- From May 12, 2002 - Sergey Azimov, general director of "Kazakhfilm" film studio.
- From June 27, 2006 - Sergey Azimov, President of JSC "Kazakhfilm" named after Sh. Aimanov.
- From November 21, 2007 - Anar Kashaganova, President of JSC "Kazakhfilm" named after Sh. Aimanov.
- From May 30, 2008 - Ermek Amanshaev, President of JSC "Kazakhfilm" named after Sh. Aimanov.
- From January 30, 2015 - Bakhyt Kairbekov, President of JSC "Kazakhfilm" named after Sh. Aimanov.
- From August 12, 2019 - Asenov Arman, President of JSC "Kazakhfilm" named after Sh. Aimanov.
- From July 2020 – September 2022 — Akan Satayev, President of JSC "Kazakhfilm" named after Sh. Aimanov.
- From July 28, 2023 – Azamat Satybaldy, President of JSC "Kazakhfilm" named after Sh. Aimanov.
