= List of historical films set in Asia =

Historical or period drama is a film genre in which stories are based on historical events and famous persons. Some historical dramas attempt to accurately portray a historical event or biography, to the degree that the available historical research will allow. Other historical dramas are fictionalised tales that are based on an actual person and their deeds.

Due to the sheer volume of films included in this genre and in the interest of continuity, this list is primarily focused on films pertaining to the history of East Asia, Central Asia, and India. For films pertaining to the history of Near Eastern and Western civilisation, please refer to list of historical period drama films and series set in Near Eastern and Western civilization.

The films on this page are divided into regions, and within each region the films are listed chronologically.

== Central Asia ==
Sortable table
Title	Release date	Time period	Setting	Notes
The Beast	1988	1981	Afghanistan	during the Soviet–Afghan War
The Orphanage	2019	1989–1990	Afghanistan	The story of children living in an orphanage in Kabul in Soviet Afghanistan and during the outbreak of the Afghan Civil War
Kandahar	2001	1996–2001	Afghanistan	Afghanistan during the Taliban regime
Tomiris	2019	6th century	Kazakhstan	Kazakhstani historical drama about Tomyris, the 6th century queen of the Massagetae
Myn Bala	2011	18th century	Kazakhstan	Kazakhstani historical dramatic film depicting the eighteenth century war fought between the Kazakhs and the Dzungar Khanate
Nomad	2006	18th century	Kazakhstan	about the early years of Ablai Khan (early 18th century), a Kazakh khan in part of what is now Kazakhstan.
Genghis Khan	1950	1158–1227	Mongolia	Life of the Mongol emperor Genghis Khan focusing on the succession of his throne.
Genghis Khan	1965	1158–1227	Mongolia	The life and conquests of the Mongol emperor Genghis Khan
Genghis Khan: To the Ends of the Earth and Sea	2007	1158–1227	Mongolia	Japanese-Mongolian film about the life of Genghis Khan
Mongol	2007	1172–1192	Mongolia	Mongolian language film depicting the early life of Genghis Khan, focusing on the years 1172–1192
The Conqueror	1956	1178–1203	Mongolia	English-language film starring John Wayne as Genghis Khan
Queen Mandukhai the Wise	1988	1449–1510	Mongolia	Mongolian language film about the life of Queen Mandukhai (1449–1510) who reunited the Mongols.
Tsogt Taij	1945	1581–1637	Mongolia	Mongolian language film about the patriotic struggle of Prince Tsogt Taij (1581–1637).
Kundun	1997	1950	Tibet	an American film depicting the early life of the 14th Dalai Lama and the 1950 invasion of Tibet and subsequent events
The Golden Horde	1951	1220	Uzbekistan	English-language film about an English knight who leads the defense of Samarkand against Genghis Khan

== South Asia ==
=== Indian History ===
Sortable table
Title	Release	Period	Note on setting
Mohenjo Daro	2016	2016 BC	Fictional story set in Mohenjo-daro, a city of the Bronze Age Indus Valley Civilization.
Siddhartha	1972	563/480–483/400 BC	About the life of a boy and his search for a meaningful way of life
Gautama Buddha	2007	563/480–483/400 BC	About the life of Gautama Buddha
Amrapali	1966	500 – ? BC	Based on the life of Ambapali in India
Sikandar	1941	326 BC	Set after Alexander the Great's conquest of Persia and as he pertains to his conquest of the kingdoms of Pauravas.
Chanakya Chandragupta	1977	3rd century BC	Based on the lives of Maurya Emperor Chandragupta Maurya and his mentor Chanakya
Asoka	2001	268–232 BC	fictionalized account of the reign of Ashoka (r. ), of the Mauryan Empire in India
Gautamiputra Satakarni	2017	2nd century	about the achievements of Satavahana dynasty ruler Gautamiputra Satakarni who defeated Indo-Sythians, Alcon-Hunns etc.
Mayura	1975	345–365	Based on the Kadamba dynasty's King Mayurasharma set in India
Rajaraja Cholan	1973	947–1014	About the life history of great king Raja Raja Chola
Maharaj	2024	1862	About the famous Maharaj Libel Case and Saurabh Shah's novel about the case.
Ponniyin Selvan	2022	947–1014	About the life history of great king Raja Raja Chola
Ambikapathy	1937	1083	Tamil, a love story set in India in 1083
Samrat Prithviraj	2022	1178–1192	Based on Prithviraj Raso by Chand Bardai narrating the life of Prithviraj Chauhan
Rudhramadevi	2015	1262–1289	Based on the life of Rudrama Devi and her achievements during her ruling period
Padmaavat	2018	1303	Based on Padmavat by Malik Muhammad Jayasi about Padmavati, a legendary Rajput queen, and her kingdom's war with the Sultan of Delhi, Alauddin Khilji
Urumi	2011	1500	Historical fiction on Portuguese colonial rule in Malabar
Marakkar: Lion of the Arabian Sea	2021	1505–1601	Based on the battle exploits and resistance of Kunjali Marakkar IV, the naval commander of the Samoothiri of Calicut, against Portuguese invasion along the Malabar Coast for establishing monopoly of trade in the Indian subcontinent.
Tenali Ramakrishna	1956	1509–1529	Based on the life of Telugu poet Tenali Ramakrishna
Jodha-Akbar	2008	1560s	Set during the reign of Mughal Emperor Akbar, and his marriage to a Hindu Rajput princess Jodhaa
Mughal-e-Azam	1960	1570/1580	Set during the Mughal Empire, depicting fictional conflict between King Akbar and his son Crown Prince Salim over semi fictional courtesan Anarkali whose historical existence is very unlikely.
Bhakta Tukaram	1973	1600s	Based on the life of Marathi poet and saint Tukaram
Taj Mahal: An Eternal Love Story	2005	1627–1658	Story of Shah Jahan and his Queen Mumtaz Mahal and history of the monument Taj Mahal built to honour Mumtaz Mahal after her death.
Pawankhind	2022	1660	Based on the last stand battle of Pavan khind fought between the forces of Chatrapati Shivaji Maharaj under Baji Prabhu Deshpande and Adilshahi forces under Siddi Jauhar.
Tanhaji: The Unsung Warrior	2020	1670	Biopic of Tanaji Malusare and centered around Maratha expedition of Kondhana also called Battle of Singhad.
Chhava	2025	1657–1689	Story of Chhatrapati Sambhaji Maharaj, his military expendition.
Hari Hara Veera Mallu	2025	17th century	Telugu film; based on the life of legendary outlaw Veera Mallu
Bajirao Mastani	2015	1720–1740	Based loosely on the life of Bajirao I and his controversial marriage to his Muslim wife Mastani albeit with lot of inaccuracies.
Veerapandiya Kattabomman	1959	1760–1799	About the resistance of Veerapandiya Kattabomman to the Company rule in India, rule of the East India Company
Panipat: The Great Betrayal	2019	1761	Based on the Third Battle of Panipat.
Laal Kaptaan	2019	1764–1789	A revenge drama set after the events of the Battle of Buxar
Thugs of Hindostan	2018	1795–1800s	Based on a band of Thugs resisting the East India Company's rule in India.
Kayamkulam Kochunni	2018	1830	Life of Kayamkulam Kochunni – a highwayman who became a legendary folk hero of Kerala, famous for his bravery, intelligence, and for stealing from the rich to help the poor
Sye Raa Narasimha Reddy	2019	1806–1847	Based on the life of Uyyalawada Narasimha Reddy
The Deceivers	1988	1825	About Thugees in India in 1825
Veer	2010	1825	Set during the 1825 Pindari movement of Rajasthan, when India was ruled by the East India Company
Shatranj Ke Khiladi	1977	1856	Entailing the East India Company's annexation of the kingdom of Oudh (Awadh) from Wajid Ali Shah in 1856 on the eve of the Sepoy Mutiny.
Junoon	1978	1857	About a love story between one of the Rebels of 1857 in Rohilkhand and an Anglo-Indian woman that he has held hostage (along with her mother and grandmother).
Mangal Pandey: The Rising	2005	1857	About Mangal Pandey and the Sepoy Mutiny of 1857.
Gandhi	1982	1869–1948	About the life of Mohandas K. Gandhi
Sardar	1993	1875–1950	Life of India's first Deputy Prime Minister and Home Minister, Sardar Vallabhbhai Patel.
Jinnah	1998	1876–1948	Film follows the life of the founder of Pakistan, Muhammad Ali Jinnah
Kappalottiya Tamizhan	1961	1870s–1930s	Film about freedom fighter V. O. Chidambaram Pillai who starts his fleet of ship by selling his property to protest against non usage of British ships for goods transport
Veer Savarkar	2001	1883–1966	About life and times of great revolutionary Swatantryaveer Vinayak Damodar Savarkar
Lagaan	2001	1893	A fictional account of a cricket game between the villagers of Champaner and the local British cantonment played in an effort to cancel the "lagaan" (a grain tax levied by the colonial authorities in India).
Netaji Subhas Chandra Bose: The Forgotten Hero	2005	1897–1945	About Indian freedom fighter Subhas Chandra Bose
Alluri Seetarama Raju	1974	1898–1924	Based on the life of Indian freedom fighter Alluri Sita Rama Raju.
Komaram Bheem	1990	1900–1940	Based on the life of Indian freedom fighter Komaram Bheem
RRR	2022	1910–1920s	Fictional story about India's freedom fighters, Alluri Sitarama Raju and Komaram Bheem; set in Delhi of 1920s
Sardar Udham	2021	1919–1940	About life and times of great revolutionary Sardar Udham
A Passage To India	1984	1920s	Based on E. M. Forster's novel about two British woman who visit India during the British Raj and their adventures there.
Paradesi	2013	1930s	Based on the lives affected by plantation.
Sam Bahadur	2023	1934–1973	Biographical war drama film based on the life of India's first field marshal, Sam Manekshaw.
Madrasapattinam	2010	1940s	A fictional account about the love story between a British woman and an Indian man during the Raj
Zubeidaa	2001	1940s/1950s	a semi-biographical account of writer Khalid Mohamed's mother, the actress Zubeida Begum that is set in the late 1940s and the 1950s.
Dharmputra	1961	1947	This picture is concerned with the communal violence that marked the Partition of India in 1947. Set in Delhi, the movie focuses on the complex relationships between two families, namely a Hindu one and a Muslim one.
1947 Earth	1998	1947	A partition film, directed by Deepa Mehta
Gadar: Ek Prem Katha	2001	1947	Another movie featuring the 1947 partition starring Sunny Deol and Amisha Patel in a Sikh-Muslim love story.
Pinjar	2003	1947	with regards to the partition of Punjab. This film is based on the Amrita Pritam story of the same name.
Partition	2007	1947	one of the more recent films on the Indian partition.
Hey Ram	2000	1948	Tamil, A period drama told in flashback, the semi-fictional plot centres on India's Partition and the assassination of Mahatma Gandhi
Gangubai Kathiawadi	2022	1952–1968	based on the life of social activist and prostitute Gangubai Kothewali
Rocket Boys	2022	1961–1967	the establishment of the Indian Space Program
Thalaivii	2021	1965–1983	based on the life of politician and actress J. Jayalalithaa
Khamosh Pani	2003	1970s	about a widowed mother and her young son set in a late 1970s village in Punjab, Pakistan which is coming under radical influence
1971	2007	1971	based on the plight of Indian prisoners of war in the aftermath of 1971 war between India and Pakistan
Border	1997	1971	based on the Battle of Longewala fought during the India–Pakistan war of 1971
Raazi	2018	1971	set during the Indo-Pakistani War
Shershaah	2021	1974–1999	about the life of Vikram Batra, an officer in the Indian Army who served in the Kargil War
Sanju	2018	1981–2016	about the life of Bollywood actor Sanjay Dutt
Karnan	2021	1995	about the 1995 Kodiyankulam violence in Tamil Nadu
Yatra	2019	2004–2009	about the padayatra done by Y. S. Rajasekhara Reddy
Manto	2018	1940–1947	based on the life of the prominent Urdu author Saadat Hasan Manto
Vikramaditya	1945	375 – c. 415	about King Vikramaditya, who promises to save the princess of Kashmir, appoints Kalidas as court-poet, and his fight against the Shakas (Scythians).
Tukaram	2012	1598/1608–1649/1650	about life of Saint Tukaram
Soorma	2018	1986–2010	about life of hockey player Sandeep Singh
The Sky Is Pink	2019	1996–2015	about life of Aisha Chaudhary, who suffered from severe combined immunodeficiency and pulmonary fibrosis
Gunjan Saxena: The Kargil Girl	2020	1984–2000	about the life of Indian Air Force pilot Gunjan Saxena, one of the first Indian female air-force pilots in combat
Veeram	2016	1600	about the life of Chandu Chekavar, warrior of the Chekavar family
Udaykal	1930	1630–1680	about the "military expeditions" of the young 17th century Maratha Emperor Shivaji.
Thomasleeha	1975	52–72	about the life of St. Thomas the Apostle and his missionary work in India
Sher Shivraj	2022	1630–1680	about the life of Maratha king, Shivaji where he defeated Afzal Khan
Santha Shishunala Sharifa	1990	1819–1889	about the life of acclaimed saint poet Shishunala Sharif
Raj Nartaki	1941	1900	set in the early 19th century in the Manipur Kingdom and is about social barriers and a court dancer.
Raag Desh	2017	1945	about the historic 1945 Indian National Army Red Fort Trials.
Pathonpatham Noottandu	2022	1825–1874	based on the life of Arattupuzha Velayudha Panicker, a warrior who fought against social injustices suffered by the lower caste
Parmanu: The Story of Pokhran	2018	1995–1998	based on the nuclear bomb test explosions conducted by the Indian Army at Pokhran in 1998
Pardesi	1957	1466–1472	based on the travelogues of Russian traveller Afanasy Nikitin, called A Journey Beyond the Three Seas
Nayika Devi: The Warrior Queen	2022	1178	based on Battle of Kasahrada
Mirza Ghalib	1954	1797–1869	Based on the life of well-known poet Mirza Ghalib
Manikarnika: The Queen of Jhansi	2019	1828–1858	Based on life of Rani Lakshmi Bai
Mamangam	2019	1800	about the Mamankam festival of the 18th century in the banks of the Bharathappuzha at Tirunavaya, in the Malabar region
Kerala Varma Pazhassi Raja	2009	1800	based on the life of Pazhassi Raja, a king who fought against the East India Company in the 18th century.
Jhansi Ki Rani	1953	1828–1858	about the bravery of queen Lakshmibai, Rani of Jhansi, who took up arms and led her army against the British
Kesari	2019	1897	Story of the Battle of Saragarhi
Hirkani	2019	1674	based on 'Hirkani', a brave woman and an amazing mother who lived near the Raigad Fort in Maharashtra during the regime Chhatrapati Shivaji Maharaj
Har Har Mahadev	2022	1660	based on Battle of Pavan Khind
Guru Da Banda	2018	1670–1716	about the life of Banda Singh Bahadur, Sikh warrior
Fatteshikast	2019	1663	Depicts the historical encounter between Chatrapati Shivaji Maharaj and the subahdar and general of the Mughal army, Shaista Khan at Lal Mahal in Pune
Farzand	2018	1673	about the story of warrior Kondaji Farzand, who along with 60 warriors defeated 2500 soldiers of the enemy to win the Panhala fort in just three and half hours in 1673
Escape from Taliban	2003	1989–1995	based on the story A Kabuliwala's Bengali Wife by Sushmita Banerjee, who fled Afghanistan in 1995 after six years of living there with her Afghan husband
Chaar Sahibzaad	2014	1526–1704	based on the sacrifices of the sons of the 10th Sikh guru Guru Gobind Singh—Sahibzada Ajit Singh, Jujhar Singh, Zorawar Singh, and Fateh Singh
Bilhanane	1948	1100	based on the story of the Kashmiri poet Bilhana
8/12	2022	1930	based on the historical attack on Writers' Building by three Bengal Volunteers in 1930.
83	2021	1983	Based on the India national cricket team led by Kapil Dev, which won the 1983 Cricket World Cup
The Accidental Prime Minister	2019	2004–2014	Based on the memoir by Indian policy analyst Sanjaya Baru, The Accidental Prime Minister explores the tenure of Manmohan Singh as the Prime Minister of India
Airlift	2016	1990	based on real life story of a Kuwait-based Malayali businessman Mathunny Mathews
The Attacks of 26/11	2013	2008	based on the book Kasab: The Face of 26/11 by Rommel Rodrigues about Ajmal Kasab perpetrator of the 2008 Mumbai attacks
Azhar	2016	1990–2012	about the life of Indian cricketer and former national team captain Mohammad Azharuddin
Batla House	2019	2008	based on the Batla House encounter case that took place on 19 September 2008
Bawandar	2000	1971–1992	based on the true story of Bhanwari Devi, a rape victim from Rajasthan, India.
Bell Bottom	2021	1980–1990	Inspired from real life hijacking events in India by Khalistani terrorists during the 1980s, such as the Indian Airlines Flight 423, 405 and 421 hijackings
Bhaag Milkha Bhaag	2013	1947–1964	Based on the life of Milkha Singh, an Indian athlete and Olympian who was a champion of the Commonwealth Games and two-times 400m champion of the Asian Games
Haseena Parkar	2017	1993–2007	Based on Dawood Ibrahim's sister Haseena Parkar
Aligarh	2015	2010	about the true story of Ramchandra Siras
Aami	2018	1934–2009	Based on the life of poet-author Kamala Das
Anna	2016	1937–2015	Based on the life of Indian social activist Anna Hazare
Daddy	2017	1955–2016	about gangster-turned-politician Arun Gawli

=== Bangladeshi History ===
Sortable Table
Title	Release date	Time period	Notes on setting
Nawab Siraj-ud-Daulah	1967	1734-1757	Based Nawab Siraj-ud-Daulah
Jibon Theke Neya	1970	1952	Based on 1952 Bengali language movement
Let Their Be Light	1970	1952	Based on 1952 Bengali language movement
Fagun Haway	2019	1952	Based on 1952 Bengali language movement
Stop Genocide	1971	1971	Based on 1971 Bangladesh Liberation War
Ora Egaro Jon	1972	1971	Based on 1971 Bangladesh Liberation War
Roktakto Bangla	1972	1971	Based on 1971 Bangladesh Liberation War
Bagha Bangali	1972	1971	Based on 1971 Bangladesh Liberation War
Arunodoyer Ogni Sakkhi	1972	1971	Based on 1971 Bangladesh Liberation War
Abar Tora Manush Ho	1973	1971	Based on 1971 Bangladesh Liberation War
Songram	1974	1971	Based on 1971 Bangladesh Liberation War
Jesus of Seventy One	1993	1971	Based on 1971 Bangladesh Liberation War
Aguner Poroshmoni	1994	1971	Based on 1971 Bangladesh Liberation War
The Song of Freedom	1995	1971	Based on 1971 Bangladesh Liberation War
Nodir Nam Modhumoti	1996	1971	Based on 1971 Bangladesh Liberation War
Muktir Kotha	1999	1971	Based on 1971 Bangladesh Liberation War
My Friend Rashed	2011	1971	Based on 1971 Bangladesh Liberation War
Shongram	2014	1971	Based on 1971 Bangladesh Liberation War
Eito Prem	2015	1971	Based on 1971 Bangladesh Liberation War
Sphulingo	2021	1971	Based on 1971 Bangladesh Liberation War
Ora 7 Jon	2023	1971	Based on 1971 Bangladesh Liberation War
Hangor Nodi Grenade	1997	1971	Based on the book of the same name by Selina Hossain: the book is based on true events
JK 1971	2023	1971	PIA flight PK712 hijacking
Ostittey Amar Desh	2007	1971	Based on the biopic of Birshreshtho Matiur Rahman
Jaago	2010	1971	Based on the Shadhin Bangla Football team
Damal	2022	1971	Based on the Shadhin Bangla Football team
Gopal Bhar	1974	1701-1767	Based on Gopal Bhar
Tungiparar Miya Bhai	2021	1920–1975	Based on the biopic of Bangabandhu Sheikh Mujibur Rahman
Mujib: The Making of a Nation	2023	1920–1975	Based on the biopic of Bangabandhu Sheikh Mujibur Rahman
Mujib Amar Pita	2021	1920–1975	Based on the novel 'Sheikh Mujib Amar Pita'
Chironjeeb Mujib	2021	1920–1975	Based on the novel 'Unfinished Memoirs'
August 1975	2021	1975	Based on the Assassination of Sheikh Mujibur Rahman
570	2024	1975	Based on the Assassination of Sheikh Mujibur Rahman
Chhutir Ghonta	1980	1980	Based on the death of a student who was locked in school washroom of a school in Narayanganj
Bikkhov	2022	2018	Based on 2018 Bangladesh road-safety protests
Poran	2022	2019	Based on the murder of Rifat Sharif

=== Pakistani history ===
Title	Language	Release date	Time period	Notes on setting
Mah e Mir	Urdu	2016	1723–1810	Based on the life of the famous poet Mir Taqi Mir
Ghalib	Urdu	1961	1797–1869	Based on the life of famous Urdu poet, Mirza Asadullah Khan Ghalib.
Jinnah	Urdu	1998	1900s–1948	Biopic based on the life of Mohammad Ali Jinnah (1876–1948), founder of Pakistan
Ghazi Ilmuddin Shaheed	Punjabi	1978	1920s	Biopic based on Ilmuddin (1908–1929), a man hanged for the murder of Mahashay Rajpal.
Ghazi Ilmuddin Shaheed	Urdu	2002	1920s	Biopic based on Ilmuddin (1908–1929), a man hanged for the murder of Mahashay Rajpal.
Manto	Urdu	2015	1940s–1950s	Biopic based on the life of writer, Saadat Hasan Manto (1912–1955).
Kartar Singh	Punjabi	1959	1940s	Based on the Partition of India.
Lakhon mein aik		1967	1947	Based on the Partition of India.
Jannat ke Talaash	Urdu	1999	1947	Based on the Partition of India.
Shah	Urdu	2015	1964–2014	Biopic based on the life of Pakistan's only boxing Olympic medallist, Hussain Shah (born 1964)
Aik Hai Nigar	Urdu	2021	1975–2021	Based on three-star general of Pakistan Army, Nigar Johar
Motorcycle Girl	Urdu	2018	2010s	Based on the life of motorcyclist Zenith Irfa

=== Sri Lankan history ===
Sortable table
Title	Release date	Time period	Notes on setting
Vijaya Kuweni	2012	543–505 BC	based on the historical tale of Wijaya-Kuveni
Aba	2008	437–367 BC	Based on the historical legend of King Pandukabhaya, the first monarch of Anuradhapura kingdom
Mahindagamanaya	2011	250 BC	based on arrival of Buddhism to Sri Lanka
Maharaja Gemunu	2015	161–137 BC	based on the odyssey of King Dutugamunu
Aloko Udapadi	2017	103 BC and c. 89–77 BC	based on the odyssey of King King Valagamba
Siri Daladagamanaya	2012	300s	based on venerated of Tooth relic to Sri Lanka
The God King	1974	473	based on the historical clash between brothers Kashyapa I and Moggalana on Sigiriya Rock
Sri Siddha	2024	1039–1110	Based on the Panakaduwa copper plate – Life story of Vijayabahu I who ruled Polonnaruwa
Siri Parakum	2013	1153–1186	based on the historical legend of King Parakramabahu the Great
Vijayaba Kollaya	2019	1521	Based on the Vijayabā Kollaya – the assassination of Vijayabahu VI by his three sons and plundering the kingdom
Devi Kusumasana	2025	1594–1604	Life story Kusumasana Devi, also known as Dona Catherina, was ruling Queen of Kandy in 1581.
Sri Wickrama	2023	1798–1815	Life story of Sri Vikrama Rajasinha who was the last king of Sri Lanka.
Ahelepola Kumarihami	2014	1814	Based on the slaughtering of the family of Ehelepola Nilame by Sri Vikrama Rajasinha
Kivulegedara Mohottala	1987	1817–1818	based on freedom fighter Kivulegedara Mohottala and Great Rebellion of 1817–1818
Vera Puran Appu	1979	1812–1848	based on freedom fighter Puran Appu
Anagarika Dharmapala Srimathano	2015	1864–1933	Life story of prominent Buddhist revivalist and writer Anagarika Dharmapala
Nidahase Piya DS	2018	1884–1952	Life story of Don Stephen Senanayake, the first Prime Minister of Sri Lanka
Ginnen Upan Seethala	2019	1943–1989	Life story of a Marxist revolutionary and the founder of Janatha Vimukthi Peramuna, Rohana Wijeweera
Rani	2025	1958–1990's	Story of the murder of Richard de Zoysa in 1990's and his mother Dr. Manohari Saravanamuttu's fight for justice.
Tsunami	2020	2004	Based on the tsunami disaster that affected Sri Lanka in 2004

== East Asia ==
=== Chinese and Taiwanese history ===
Sortable table
Title	Release date	Time period	Notes on setting
Xuan Yuan: The Great Emperor	2016	2698 BC	a Chinese drama film about the story of the Yellow Emperor
The Last Woman of Shang	1964	1075–1046 BC	a Hong Kong film about Daji, a concubine of King Zhou of Shang
The Grand Substitution	1965	607-581 BC	a Hong Kong film based on the play The Orphan of Zhao, set in the Jin state during the Spring and Autumn period
Sacrifice	2010	607–581 BC	based on the play The Orphan of Zhao, set in the Jin state during the Spring and Autumn period
Confucius	1940	551–479 BC	thought to be a lost film, but was rediscovered in 2001 and restored
Confucius	2010	505–479 BC	starring Chow Yun-fat as Confucius
An Empress and the Warriors	2008	c. 475–221 BC	set in the Yan kingdom during the Warring states period
Little Big Soldier	2010	475–221 BC	an action-comedy film set in the Warring States period, about a war between the Liang and Wey states
A Battle of Wits	2006	375–369 BC	set in the reign of King Lie of Zhou
Qu Yuan	1977	c. 339−278 BC	about the tragedy of the great Chinese ancient poet Qu Yuan during the Warring States period
The Warring States	2011	c. 316 BC	set in the Warring States period (475–221 BC), loosely based on the rivalry between Sun Bin (d. 316 BC) and Pang Juan (d. 342 BC)
The Emperor's Shadow	1996	259–210 BC	about a troubled friendship between Qin Shi Huang and the musician Gao Jianli
Wheat	2009	260 BC	the story of women left behind when their husbands went to war during the Battle of Changping
First Emperor: The Man Who Made China	2006	247–210 BC	documentary with reenactments of events in the life of Qin Shi Huang
The Emperor and the Assassin	1998	227 BC	based on the assassination attempt by Jing Ke on Qin Shi Huang
Hero	2002	227 BC	based on the assassination attempt by Jing Ke on Qin Shi Huang
The Great Conqueror's Concubine	1994	206–202 BC	a Hong Kong film set in the Chu–Han Contention
White Vengeance	2011	206–202 BC	loosely based on the Feast at Hong Gate and events in the Chu–Han Contention
The Last Supper	2012	206–202 BC	based on events in the Chu–Han Contention
Dragon Blade	2005	48 BC	about a fictional elite fighting force created by the Han dynasty to preserve peace in Northwestern China
Red Cliff	2008	208–209	epic war film based on the Battle of Red Cliffs
The Assassins	2012	210	set in China in the late 210s – the years preceding the end of the Han dynasty
The Lost Bladesman	2011	219	a Hong Kong film loosely based on the story of Guan Yu (d. 219) in the novel Romance of the Three Kingdoms
Shadow	2018	220−280	set during the Three Kingdoms period
Three Kingdoms: Resurrection of the Dragon	2008	229	a Hong Kong film about Zhao Yun, loosely based on parts of the novel Romance of the Three Kingdoms
Mulan	2009	c. 386–534	based on the legend of Hua Mulan
Mulan Joins the Army	1939	c. 567–571	based on the legend of Hua Mulan
Xuanzang	2016	602−664	about the life of Xuanzang, a Buddhist monk and scholar during the Tang dynasty
Shaolin Temple	1982	619–621	starring Jet Li, based on the story of Shaolin Temple help Li Shimin
The Empress Wu Tse-tien	1939	650–705	based on the story of Wu Zetian
Detective Dee and the Mystery of the Phantom Flame	2010	684–690	a Hong Kong film based on a fictional account of Di Renjie, set in the reign of Wu Zetian
Warriors of Heaven and Earth	2003	700	an action-adventure film set in Xinjiang
Lady of the Dynasty	2015	719−756	about the life of Yang Guifei, one of the Four Beauties of China
The Promise	2005	766–780	set during the end of the Tang dynasty
Avalokitesvara	2013	840−846	set during the end of the Tang dynasty
House of Flying Daggers	2004	859	set during the end of the Tang dynasty
Trilogy of Swordsmanship (Part 2: The Tigress)	1972	860s	a Hong Kong film (only Part 2) set during Pang Xun's rebellion
The Heroic Ones	1970	880s	a Hong Kong film about Li Keyong's generals
General Stone	1976	880s	a Hong Kong film about Li Cunxiao
The Banquet	2006	907−979	set during the Five Dynasties and Ten Kingdoms period
Curse of the Golden Flower	2006	928	set during the Later Tang dynasty
All the King's Men	1983	950s	a Taiwanese film about Chai Rong's last days
Great Liao's Empress Dowager	1995	969–982	a Chinese film about Empress Xiao Yanyan
Saving General Yang	2013	980s	a Hong Kong film about the Generals of the Yang Family legends
The Eight Diagram Pole Fighter	1983	980s	a Hong Kong film about the Generals of the Yang Family legends
The Eight Diagram Cudgel Fighter	1985	980s	a Hong Kong film about the Generals of the Yang Family legends
Generals of the Yang Family	1984	980s	a Chinese film about the Generals of the Yang Family legends
The Silk Road	1988	1026	a Japanese film about Western Xia
The 14 Amazons	1972	1030s	a Hong Kong film about the Genearals of the Yang Family legends
Legendary Amazons	2011	1030s	a Chinese film about the Genearals of the Yang Family legends
The Journey to Xixia Empire	1997	1087	a Chinese film about Western Xia (Xixia)
Full River Red	2023	1146	about a mystery case set in the beginning era of Southern Song dynasty
An End to Killing	2013	1200s	about the conquest of China by Genghis Khan
Marco Polo	1982	1254–1324	an American-Italian television miniseries about the Venetian explorer who traveled to China and served in the court of Kublai Khan
The Black Rose	1950	1272–1279	English-language film about an English Saxon who travels China and meet a Mongol warlord
Reign of Assassins	2010	1368–1644	an assassin transforms herself to escape her past in Ming China
Brotherhood of Blades	2014	1627	set during the end of the Ming dynasty, under the reign of Chongzhen Emperor
Brotherhood of Blades II: The Infernal Battlefield	2017	1627	set during the end of the Ming dynasty, under the reign of Chongzhen Emperor
Fall of Ming	2013	1642	about the fall of the Ming dynasty
The Sino-Dutch War 1661	2000	1645–62	based on the story of Koxinga (1624–1662), with the focus on the Siege of Fort Zeelandia
The Palace	2013	1661–1722	set during the reign of Kangxi Emperor
The Opium War	1997	1839–42	historical epic film about the First Opium War, told through the eyes of Lin Zexu and Charles Elliot
The Empress Dowager	1975	1835–1908	a Hong Kong film about Empress Dowager Cixi
Li Lianying: The Imperial Eunuch	1991	1848–1911	the Qing dynasty eunuch Li Lianying
The Warlords	2007	1850–64	set in the Qing dynasty during the Taiping Rebellion
Fearless	2006	1868–1910	a biographical film about late Qing dynasty martial artist Huo Yuanjia
The Last Tempest	1976	1875−1908	a Hong Kong film about the life of Guangxu Emperor
The Woman Knight of Mirror Lake	2011	1875–1907	a biographical film about revolutionary Qiu Jin
The Sino-Japanese War at Sea 1894	2012	1877−1895	based on the events of the First Sino-Japanese War
Forever Enthralled	2008	1894–1961	biographical film about Peking opera artist Mei Lanfang
1895	2008	1895	a Taiwanese film about the Japanese invasion of Taiwan and the Hakka resistance
Blade of Fury	1993	1898	set during the Hundred Days' Reform
Empire of Silver	2009	1899–1901	a Hong Kong film set in the Qing dynasty during the Boxer Rebellion
55 Days at Peking	1963	1900	an American film starring Charlton Heston, Ava Gardner and David Niven and set during the Boxer Rebellion
Red River Valley	1997	1903–1904	about the British expedition to Tibet
The Tokyo Trial	2006	1904–1973	presenting the Tokyo War Crimes Tribunal from the point of view of Mei Ju-ao
The Last Emperor	1987	1906–1967	an Academy Award winning film about China's last emperor Puyi
Kawashima Yoshiko	1990	1907−1948	a Hong Kong film based on the life of Yoshiko Kawashima, a Manchu princess who was brought up as a Japanese and served as a spy in the service of the Japanese Kwantung Army and Manchukuo during the Second World War
Road to Dawn	2007	1910	about Sun Yat-sen's life in Penang from July to December 1910
Magnificent 72	1980	1911	about Lin Juemin and the Second Guangzhou Uprising, with a brief scene of Qiu Jin's arrest in 1907
Bodyguards and Assassins	2009	1911	a Hong Kong film set in colonial Hong Kong near the end of the Qing dynasty. The events in the film led to the Wuchang Uprising
The Battle for the Republic of China	1981	1911	a Taiwanese film about the Xinhai Revolution
1911	2011	1911	about the Xinhai Revolution
The Soong Sisters	1997	1911–1949	about the Soong sisters
The Founding of a Party	2011	1921	about the formation of the Chinese Communist Party in 1921
1921	2012	1921	about the formation of the Chinese Communist Party in 1921
Lai Shi, China's Last Eunuch	1988	1924	a Hong Kong film about the Last Eunuch in China
The Founding of an Army	2017	1927	about the founding of the People's Liberation Army
Night in Jinling	1985	1927−1931	about the Kuomintang turn against the Chinese Communist Party and the Shanghai massacre
Bridge	1949	1927–1950	the Chinese Civil War
Yangtse Incident	1957	1927–1950	a British film about the Royal Navy frigate HMS Amethyst getting caught up in the Chinese Civil War
Assembly	2007	1927–1950	epic war film set in the Chinese Civil War
The Bugle from Gutian	2019	1929	based on the 1929 Gutian Congress
Seediq Bale	2011	1930	film depicting the plight of Taiwanese aborigines of the Seediq tribe during the period of Taiwan under Japanese rule, and their role in the Wushe Incident
Cliff Walkers	2021	1930s	set in the Imperial Japanese puppet state of Manchukuo in the 1930s before World War II erupts
Red Sorghum	1987	1930s	set during the eastern province of Shandong during the Second Sino-Japanese War
A Murder Beside Yanhe River	2014	1933–1937	based on the murder case of Huang Kegong, who was a general of the Chinese Workers' and Peasants' Red Army
7-Man Army	1976	1933	a Hong Kong film depicting the Defense of the Great Wall
The National Anthem	1999	1935	about the composition of "The March of the Volunteers"
The Secret of China	2019	1936	about the communist journalist Edgar Snow meets Mao Zedong
The Xi'an Incident	1981	1936	about the Xi'an Incident
Eight Hundred Heroes	1976	1937	a Taiwanese film depicting the Defense of Sihang Warehouse
The Eight Hundred	2020	1937	the Defense of Sihang Warehouse
Black Sun: The Nanking Massacre	1994	1937	a Hong Kong film about the Nanking Massacre
Don't Cry, Nanking	1995	1937	the Nanking Massacre
City of Life and Death	2009	1937	dealing with the Battle of Nanjing and its aftermath, the Nanking Massacre
John Rabe	2009	1937	a biographical film about John Rabe and his experiences in the Nanking Massacre
The Flowers of War	2011	1937	about a group of escapees caught up in the 1937 Battle of Nanking
Heroes of the Eastern Skies	1977	1937–1938	a Taiwanese film based on the true story of a small group of Chinese flying aces in 1937 at the beginning of the Second Sino-Japanese War
The Spring River Flows East	1947	1937–1945	the trials and tribulations of a Chinese family through the Second Sino-Japanese War
Tunnel War	1965	1937–1945	about a small town defending itself by use of a network of tunnels during the Second Sino-Japanese War
Men Behind the Sun	1988	1937–1945	a Hong Kong film depicting war atrocities committed by the Japanese Unit 731 during World War II
On the Mountain of Tai Hang	2005	1937–1945	about the Eighth Route Army, set in the Second Sino-Japanese War
The Children of Huang Shi	2008	1938	about George Hogg leading 60 orphans across China in an effort to save them from conscription during the Second Sino-Japanese War
Hong Kong 1941	1983	1941–1945	a Hong Kong film set in Japanese-occupied Hong Kong during World War II
Phurbu & Tenzin	2014	1944–1980	about the two monks in Tibet
Hundred Regiments Offensive	2015	1945	about the end of the Second Sino-Japanese war
The Crossing	2014	1945–1949	about the Second Sino-Japanese war and the siking of Taiping.
A City of Sadness	1989	1947	Taiwanese historical drama film sets immediately after WWII in the late 1940s. The film was the first to depict the February 28 Incident of 1947, an anti-government uprising that was quelled.
Decisive Engagement: The Liaoxi-Shenyang Campaign	1991	1948	about the Chinese Civil War (Liaoshen Campaign, Huaihai Campaign and Pingjin Campaign)
Fight for Nanjing, Shanghai and Hangzhou	1999	1949	about the war between the Communist troops and the Kuomintang troops in east China during the Chinese Civil War
The Great Military March Forward: Engulf the Southwest	1998	1949	about the war between the Communist troops and the KMT troops in southwest China during the Chinese Civil War
The Founding of a Republic	2009	1949	about the founding of the People's Republic of China
Mao Zedong 1949	2019	1949	about the founding of the People's Republic of China
Where the Wind Settles	2015	1949−2010	a Taiwanese film about the lives of several mainland Chinese people who resettled in Taiwan near the end of the Chinese Civil War
Septet: The Story of Hong Kong	2020	1950−2020	a Hong Kong film divided into seven stories, each corresponding to a decade in Hong Kong's history, told from the view of ordinary people
Sniper	2022	1950−1953	based on a fictionalized account of the real life story of Zhang Taofang, a Chinese sniper fighting American soldiers in the Korean War
The Battle at Lake Changjin	2021	1950	about the Chinese People's Volunteer Army during the Battle of the Chosin Reservoir in the Korean War
The Battle at Lake Changjin II	2022	1950	about the Chinese People's Volunteer Army during the Battle of the Chosin Reservoir in the Korean War
The Sacrifice	2020	1953	about the Chinese People's Volunteer Army launching its last large-scale campaign during the Korean War, the Jincheng Campaign
24 City	2008	1958–1980	A docudrama film about the generations of people who worked in state factories during the industrialization and were demolished during the modernization of China.
Coming Home	2014	1966–1976	set during the Cultural Revolution in China.
Aftershock	2010	1976–2010	the aftermath of the 1976 Tangshan earthquake
Deng Xiaoping	2003	1978	about Deng Xiaoping and the 3rd plenary session of the 11th Central Committee of the Chinese Communist Party

=== Japanese history ===
==== Samurai cinema and Jidai-geki films ====
Jidai-geki 時代劇 is a genre of film, television, and theatre in Japan. Literally "period dramas", they are most often set during the Edo period of Japanese history, from 1603 to 1868. Some, however, are set much earlier—Portrait of Hell, for example, is set during the late Heian period—and the early Meiji era is also a popular setting. Jidaigeki show the lives of the samurai, farmers, craftsmen, and merchants of their time. Jidaigeki films are sometimes referred to as chambara movies, a word meaning "sword fight", though chambara is more accurately a subgenre of jidaigeki, which equates to historical period drama. In Japan, the term chanbara (チャンバラ), also commonly spelled "chambara", meaning "sword fighting" movies, denotes the genre called samurai cinema in English, and is roughly equivalent to western cowboy and swashbuckler films. Jidaigeki may refer to a story set in a historical period, though not necessarily dealing with a samurai character or depicting swordplay. Jidaigeki rely on an established set of dramatic conventions including the use of makeup, language, catchphrases, and plotlines.

Title	Director	Notable cast	Release date	Time period	Notes
Kōchiyama to Nao-zamurai		Ichitarō Kataoka, Matsunosuke Onoe, Kijaku Ōtani	1916		Based on the play of the same name.
Nao-zamurai	Jiro Yoshino	Shirogoro Sawamura	1922		Based on the play of the same name.
A Diary of Chuji's Travels	Daisuke Itō	Denjirō Ōkōchi	1927		Awards: 1 Kinema Junpo Award
Sword of Penitence	Yasujirō Ozu	Saburo Azuma, Kunimatsu Ogawa, Kanji Kawahara, Shoichi Nodera	1927		
Jobless Samurai	Masahiro Makino	Kōmei Minami, Tōichirō Negishi, Tsuyako Okajima	1928		Awards: 1 Kinema Junpo Award
Nao-zamurai	Kintarō Inoue	Chōjirō Hayashi, Ryūnosuke Tsukigata, Kōkichi Takada, Kinuko Wakamizu	1930		Based on the play of the same name.
Jirokichi the Rat	Daisuke Itō	Denjirō Ōkōchi, Naoe Fushimi, Nobuko Fushimi	1931		
Chūshingura Zenpen: Akōkyō no maki	Teinosuke Kinugasa	Tomio Aoki, Juzaburo Bando, Kōtarō Bandō	1932		
Chūshingura – Ninjō-hen, Fukushū-hen	Daisuke Itō	Shinpachirō Asaka, Satoko Date, Sannosuke Fujikawa	1934		
The Million Ryo Pot	Sadao Yamanaka	Denjirō Ōkōchi, Kiyozo, Kunitarō Sawamura	1935		
The Avenging Ghost of Yukinojo, Part 1	Teinosuke Kinugasa	Kazuo Hasegawa, Tokusaburo Arashi, Akiko Chihaya	1935		
The Avenging Ghost of Yukinojo, Part 2	Teinosuke Kinugasa	Kazuo Hasegawa, Tokusaburo Arashi, Akiko Chihaya	1935		
Daibosatsu tōge: dai-ippen – Kōgen itto-ryū no maki	Hiroshi Inagaki	Fujiko Fukamizu, Ranko Hanai, Takako Irie	1935		
The Avenging Ghost of Yukinojo, Part 3	Teinosuke Kinugasa	Kazuo Hasegawa, Tokusaburo Arashi, Akiko Chihaya	1936		
Daibosatsu tōge: Suzuka-yama no maki – Mibu Shimabara no maki	Hiroshi Inagaki	Fujiko Fukamizu, Kobunji Ichikawa, Momonosuke Ichikawa	1936		
Humanity and Paper Balloons	Sadao Yamanaka	Chojuro Kawarazaki, Kanemon Nakamura, Shizue Yamagishi	1937	18th century	
Chikemuri Takadanobaba	Hiroshi Inagaki, Masahiro Makino	Tsumasaburō Bandō, Tokuma Dan, Komako Hara	1937		
Chushingura, Part One	Kajirō Yamamoto	Denjirō Ōkōchi, Kazuo Hasegawa, Yatarō Kurokawa	1939	1701	
Chushingura, Part Two	Kajirō Yamamoto	Denjirō Ōkōchi, Kazuo Hasegawa, Yatarō Kurokawa	1939	1701	
Singing Lovebirds	Masahiro Makino	Chiezō Kataoka, Takashi Shimura	1939		
A Color Print of Edo	Kazuo Mori	Shinpachirō Asaka, Utaemon Ichikawa, Yaeko Kumoi	1939		
The 47 Ronin	Kenji Mizoguchi	Chojuro Kawarasaki, Kanemon Nakamura, Kunitaro Kawarazaki, Yoshizaburo Arashi, Daisuke Katō	1941	1701–1703	Two-part film depicting the famous actions of the Forty-seven rōnin in 1701–1703. Part 2 was released on 1942.02.11.
Kikuchi sembon-yari: Shidonî tokubetsu kōgeki-tai	Tomiyasu Ikeda, Sentarō Shirai	Kanzo Yoshii, Utaemon Ichikawa, Kusuo Abe	1944		
A Tale of Archery at the Sanjusangendo	Mikio Naruse	Kazuo Hasegawa, Kinuyo Tanaka, Sensho Ichikawa	1945		
Utamaro and His Five Women	Kenji Mizoguchi	Minosuke Bandō, Kinuyo Tanaka, Kōtarō Bandō	1946	1800s	
Surōnin makaritōru	Daisuke Itō	Tsumasaburō Bandō, Ryūtarō Ōtomo, Kusuo Abe	1947		
Ore wa yojinbo	Hiroshi Inagaki	Chiezō Kataoka, Ryūnosuke Tsukigata, Achako Hanabishi	1950		
Senritsu	Hideo Sekigawa	Utaemon Ichikawa, Haruyo Ichikawa	1950		
Wakasama zamurai torimonochō: nazo no nōmen yashiki	Nobuo Nakagawa	Yatarō Kurokawa, Denjirō Ōkōchi, Seizaburō Kawazu	1950		
Rashomon	Akira Kurosawa	Toshirō Mifune, Masayuki Mori, Machiko Kyō, Takashi Shimura	1950	12th century	
Kanketsu Sasaki Kojirō: Ganryū-jima kettō	Hiroshi Inagaki	Tomoemon Otani, Toshirō Mifune, Hisako Yamane	1951		
Five Men of Edo	Daisuke Itō	Tsumasaburō Bandō, Utaemon Ichikawa, Isuzu Yamada	1951		
Vendetta of a Samurai	Kazuo Mori	Toshirō Mifune, Yuriko Hamada, Takashi Shimura	1952	early 17th century	Awards: 1 Blue Ribbon Award, 1 Mainichi Film Concours
The Life of Oharu	Kenji Mizoguchi	Kinuyo Tanaka, Tsukie Matsuura, Ichirō Sugai, Toshirō Mifune, Takashi Shimura	1952	17th century	
The Men Who Tread on the Tiger's Tail	Akira Kurosawa	Denjirō Ōkōchi, Susumu Fujita, Kenichi Enomoto	1952	1185	
Sword for Hire	Hiroshi Inagaki	Rentarō Mikuni, Danshirō Ichikawa, Shirley Yamaguchi	1952		
Tsukigata Hanpeita	Kokichi Uchide	Hiroshi Aoyama, Masao Aoyama, Michiyo Azuma	1952		
Ugetsu Monogatari	Kenji Mizoguchi	Masayuki Mori, Machiko Kyō, Kinuyo Tanaka	1953	c. 1598–1600	Based on the novel of the same name, set in the Ōmi Province during the Azuchi-Momoyama period
Gate of Hell	Teinosuke Kinugasa	Kazuo Hasegawa, Machiko Kyō	1953	1159	Awards: 2 Academy Awards, 1 Golden Leopard, 1 New York Film Critics Circle Award, Palme d'Or,
Sansho the Bailiff	Kenji Mizoguchi	Kinuyo Tanaka, Yoshiaki Hanayagi, Kyōko Kagawa, Eitarō Shindō	1954	794–1185	Awards: 1 Silver Lion
Seven Samurai	Akira Kurosawa	Takashi Shimura, Toshirō Mifune	1954	1586	Awards: 2 Jussi Awards, 1 Mainichi Film Award, 1 Silver Lion
Akō gishi	Ryohei Arai	Yatarō Kurokawa	1954		
Samurai I: Musashi Miyamoto	Hiroshi Inagaki	Toshirō Mifune, Rentarō Mikuni	1954	1600	Awards: 1 Academy Award
The Crucified Lovers	Kenji Mizoguchi	Kazuo Hasegawa, Kyōko Kagawa, Eitarō Shindō	1954		Awards: 1 Blue Ribbon Award
The Playful Fox and the Thousand Cherry Trees	Torajiro Saito	Takashi Wada, Yumiko Hasegawa	1954		
Bloody Spear at Mount Fuji	Tomu Uchida	Chiezo Kataoka, Ryūnosuke Tsukigata, Chizuru Kitagawa	1955	1603–1868	Awards: 1 Blue Ribbon Award
Samurai II: Duel at Ichijoji Temple	Hiroshi Inagaki	Toshirō Mifune, Kōji Tsuruta	1955		
The Lone Journey	Hiroshi Inagaki	Ryō Ikebe, Mariko Okada, Akihiko Hirata	1955		
Tales of the Taira Clan	Kenji Mizoguchi	Narutoshi Hayashi, Raizō Ichikawa, Tatsuya Ishiguro	1955		Awards: 1 Mainichi Film Concours
Samurai III: Duel at Ganryu Island	Hiroshi Inagaki	Toshirō Mifune, Kōji Tsuruta	1956		
Akō Rōshi: Ten no Maki, Chi no Maki	Sadatsugu Matsuda	Harue Akagi, Ryūtarō Aoyagi, Ushio Akashi	1956	1701	
Yagyū Ren'yasai: Hidentsuki Kageshō	Katsuhiko Tasaka	Raizo Ichikawa, Shintaro Katsu, Yataro Kurokawa, Ryosuke Kagawa	1956	1603–1868	
Ghost of Hanging in Utusunomiya	Nobuo Nakagawa	Hiroshi Ogasawara, Akemi Tsukushi, Tetsurō Tamba	1956		
Dandy Sashichi Detective Story: Six Famous Beauties	Nobuo Nakagawa	Tomisaburō Wakayama, Keiko Hibino, Misako Uji	1956		
Throne of Blood	Akira Kurosawa	Toshirō Mifune, Isuzu Yamada, Takashi Shimura	1957	16th century	
The Lord Takes a Bride	Sadatsugu Matsuda	Harue Akagi, Ushio Akashi	1957		
Yagyu Secret Scrolls	Hiroshi Inagaki	Toshirō Mifune, Kōji Tsuruta, Yoshiko Kuga, Mariko Okada, Denjiro Okochi, Kyoko Kagawa	1957		
Akadō Suzunosuke: Tsukiyo no kaijin	Bin Kado	Masaji Umeiwa, Narutoshi Hayashi, Tamao Nakamura	1957		
Adauchi sōzenji baba	Masahiro Makino	Ryūtarō Ōtomo	1957		
Souls in the Moonlight	Tomu Uchida	Chiezo Kataoka, Kinnosuke Nakamura, Yumiko Hasegawa	1957		Awards: 1 Mainichi Film Concours
Sun in the Last Days of the Shogunate	Yuzo Kawashima	Frankie Sakai, Yōko Minamida, Sachiko Hidari, Yujiro Ishihara	1957	1853–1867	Awards: 1 Blue Ribbon Award, 1 Kinema Junpo Award, 1 Mainichi Film Concours
A Matter of Valor	Tatsuo Osone	Ennosuke Ichikawa, Danko Ichikawa, Yaeko Mizutani, Kōkichi Takada	1957		
Akadō Suzunosuke: Shingetsu-to no yōki	Bin Kado	Masaji Umeiwa, Narutoshi Hayashi, Tamao Nakamura	1957		
The Prodigal Son	Hiromichi Horikawa	Nakamura Senjaku II, Nakamura Ganjirō II, Eiko Miyoshi	1957		
Demon Crusader	Kenji Misumi	Raizō Ichikawa, Yōko Uraji, Seizaburō Kawazu	1957		Based on the novel of the same name.
The Idle Vassal: House of the Snake Princess	Yasushi Sasaki	Utaemon Ichikawa	1957		
Yagyu Secret Scrolls, Part II	Hiroshi Inagaki	Toshirō Mifune, Kōji Tsuruta, Yoshiko Kuga, Mariko Okada, Nobuko Otowa, Eijirō Tōno	1958		
Chushingura	Kunio Watanabe	Kazuo Hasegawa, Shintaro Katsu, Kōji Tsuruta, Raizō Ichikawa, Machiko Kyō	1958		
Suzunosuke Akado: The Birdman with Three Eyes	Kazuo Mori	Masaji Umeiwa, Narutoshi Hayashi, Yatarō Kurokawa	1958		
Detective Hibari: Case of the Golden Hairpins	Tadashi Sawashima	Hibari Misora, Kōtarō Satomi, Chiyonosuke Azuma	1958		
The Ballad of Narayama	Keisuke Kinoshita	Kinuyo Tanaka, Teiji Takahashi, Yuuko Mochizuki	1958		Awards: 3 Kinema Junpo Awards, 3 Mainichi Film Concours
The 7th Secret Courier for Edo	Kazuo Mori	Raizo Ichikawa, Michiko Ai, Tokiko Mita	1958		
The Barbarian and the Geisha	John Huston	John Wayne, Eiko Ando, Sam Jaffe, Sō Yamamura	1958	1856	
The Hidden Fortress	Akira Kurosawa	Toshirō Mifune, Misa Uehara, Minoru Chiaki, Kamatari Fujiwara	1958	16th century	Awards: 1 Silver Bear Award
Life of an Expert Swordsman	Hiroshi Inagaki	Toshirō Mifune, Yoko Tsukasa	1959		
Hawk of the North	Toshikazu Kōno	Kinnosuke Nakamura, Keiko Ogawa, Yoshiko Sakuma	1959		
The Ghost of Yotsuya	Nobuo Nakagawa	Shigeru Amachi, Noriko Kitazawa, Katsuko Wakasugi	1959		
Kagerō Ezu	Teinosuke Kinugasa	Raizō Ichikawa, Fujiko Yamamoto, Osamu Takizawa	1959		
Shinsengumi: Last Days of the Shogunate	Ko Sasaki	Chiezo Kataoka, Tomisaburō Wakayama, Yatarō Kurokawa	1960		
The Story of Osaka Castle	Hiroshi Inagaki	Toshirō Mifune, Kyōko Kagawa, Akihiko Hirata	1961	c. 1610	Set about a decade after the battle of Sekigahara
Samurai Hawk	Nobuo Nakagawa	Utaemon Ichikawa, Ryūji Shinagawa, Atsushi Watanabe	1961		
Akō Rōshi	Sadatsugu Matsuda	Kusuo Abe, Kyōko Aoyama, Chiyonosuke Azuma	1961		
Yojimbo	Akira Kurosawa	Toshirō Mifune, Tatsuya Nakadai, Yoko Tsukasa, Isuzu Yamada	1961	1860	
Miyamoto Musashi	Tomu Uchida	Kinnosuke Nakamura, Akiko Kazami, Wakaba Irie	1961		
Hangyakuji	Daisuke Itō	Kinnosuke Nakamura, Haruko Sugimura, Chiyonosuke Azuma	1961		Awards: 1 Blue Ribbon Award, 1 Mainichi Film Concours
Sanjuro	Akira Kurosawa	Toshirō Mifune, Tatsuya Nakadai, Keiju Kobayashi, Yūzō Kayama	1962		Sequel to the 1961 film Yojimbo.
In Search of Mother	Tai Katō	Kinnosuke Nakamura, Hiroki Matsukata, Michiyo Kogure	1962		
Shiro Amakusa, the Christian Rebel	Nagisa Oshima	Hashizō Ōkawa, Ryūtarō Ōtomo, Satomi Oka	1962		
Princess Sen and Hideyori	Masahiro Makino	Hibari Misora, Kinnosuke Nakamura, Ken Takakura, Jūshirō Konoe	1962	1615–1616	
The Tale of Zatoichi	Kenji Misumi	Shintaro Katsu, Masayo Banri, Ryuzo Shimada, Hajime Mitamura, Shigeru Amachi	1962		
Harakiri	Masaki Kobayashi	Tatsuya Nakadai, Rentarō Mikuni, Shima Iwashita, Akira Ishihama	1962	1619–1630	
The Tale of Zatoichi Continues	Kazuo Mori	Shintarō Katsu, Yoshie Mizutani, Masayo Banri, Tomisaburō Wakayama	1962		
Chushingura	Hiroshi Inagaki	Matsumoto Hakuō I, Yūzō Kayama, Toshirō Mifune, Chūsha Ichikawa, Akira Kubo	1962	1701–1703	Another film about the Forty-seven rōnin.
Miyamoto Musashi: Showdown at Hannyazaka Heights	Tomu Uchida	Kinnosuke Nakamura, Wakaba Irie, Isao Kimura	1962		
Shinobi no Mono	Satsuo Yamamoto	Raizō Ichikawa, Yūnosuke Itō, Shiho Fujimura	1962	1575–1581	Based on the novel of the same name.
Shinsengumi Chronicles	Kenji Misumi	Shigeru Amachi, San'emon Arashi, Saburō Date	1963		
An Actor's Revenge	Kon Ichikawa	Kazuo Hasegawa, Fujiko Yamamoto	1963		Remake of the 1935 film An Actor's Revenge.
Escape from Hell	Kazuo Inoue	Keiji Sada, Mariko Okada, Takahiro Tamura	1963		
The New Tale of Zatoichi	Tokuzo Tanaka	Shintaro Katsu, Mikiko Tsubouchi	1963		
Sengoku Yaro	Kihachi Okamoto	Yūzō Kayama, Yuriko Hoshi, Makoto Satō	1963		
Castle of Owls	Eiichi Kudō	Ryūtarō Ōtomo, Minoru Ōki, Hizuru Takachiho	1963		
Cruel Tales of Bushido	Tadashi Imai	Kinnosuke Nakamura, Eijirō Tōno, Kyōko Kishida	1963		
Bloody Record of the Shinsengumi	Shigehiro Ozawa	Utaemon Ichikawa, Takeshi Katō, Kei Satō	1963		
Brave Records of the Sanada Clan	Tai Kato	Kinnosuke Nakamura, Misako Watanabe	1963		
Seventeen Ninja	Yasuto Hasegawa	Kōtarō Satomi, Jūshirō Konoe, Yuriko Mishima	1963		
Zatoichi the Fugitive	Tokuzo Tanaka	Shintaro Katsu, Miwa Takada, Sachiko Murase	1963		
Shinobi no Mono 2: Vengeance	Satsuo Yamamoto	Raizō Ichikawa, Shiho Fujimura	1963	1582–1594	Based on the novel of the same name.
Miyamoto Musashi: The Duel Against Yagyu	Tomu Uchida	Kinnosuke Nakamura, Wakaba Irie, Isao Kimura	1963		
The Great Bandit	Senkichi Taniguchi	Toshirō Mifune, Tadao Nakamaru, Mie Hama	1963		
Sleepy Eyes of Death: The Chinese Jade	Tokuzō Tanaka	Raizō Ichikawa, Tamao Nakamura, Shinobu Araki	1963		
Zatoichi on the Road	Kimiyoshi Yasuda	Shintarō Katsu, Shiho Fujimura, Ryūzō Shimada	1963		
Thirteen Assassins	Eiichi Kudo	Chiezo Kataoka, Kō Nishimura, Ryōhei Uchida	1963		
Shinobi no Mono 3: Resurrection	Kazuo Mori	Raizō Ichikawa, Ayako Wakao, Saburō Date	1963	1595–1600	Based on the novel of the same name.
Miyamoto Musashi: The Duel at Ichijoji	Tomu Uchida	Kinnosuke Nakamura, Wakaba Irie, Isao Kimura	1964		
Sleepy Eyes of Death: Sword of Adventure	Kenji Misumi	Raizō Ichikawa, Kōichi Aihara, San'emon Arashi	1964		
Warrior of the Wind	Tai Katō	Hashizō Ōkawa, Hiroko Sakuramachi, Naoko Kubo	1964		
The Third Ninja	Toshikazu Kōno	Kōtarō Satomi, Kōji Nanbara, Kei Satō, Kikuko Hōjō, Misako Watanabe	1964	1572	
Zatoichi and the Chest of Gold	Kazuo Ikehiro	Shintarō Katsu, Shōgo Shimada, Mikiko Tsubouchi	1964		
Three Outlaw Samurai	Hideo Gosha	Tetsurō Tamba, Isamu Nagato, Mikijirō Hira, Yoshiko Kayama	1964		
Sleepy Eyes of Death: Full Circle Killing	Kimiyoshi Yasuda	Raizō Ichikawa, Kyooko Azuma, Ryonosuke Azuma	1964		
Assassination	Masahiro Shinoda	Tetsurō Tamba, Shima Iwashita	1964		
Shinobi no Mono 4: Siege	Tokuzo Tanaka	Raizō Ichikawa, Saburō Date, Midori Isomura	1964	1614–1615	
Sleepy Eyes of Death: Sword of Seduction	Kazuo Ikehiro	Raizō Ichikawa, Michiko Ai, Akira Amemiya	1964		
Fight, Zatoichi, Fight	Kenji Misumi	Shintarō Katsu, Nobuo Kaneko, Gen Kimura	1964		
Adauchi	Tadashi Imai	Kinnosuke Nakamura, Takahiro Tamura, Tetsurō Tamba	1964		
Onibaba	Kaneto Shindo	Nobuko Otowa, Jitsuko Yoshimura, Kei Satō	1964		
The Scarlet Camellia	Yoshitarō Nomura	Shima Iwashita, Yoshi Katō, Sachiko Hidari	1964		Awards: 1 Blue Ribbon Award
Adventures of Zatoichi	Kimiyoshi Yasuda	Shintarō Katsu, Miwa Takada, Eiko Taki	1964		
Bakumatsu zankoku monogatari	Tai Katō	Sumiko Fuji, Chōichirō Kawarasaki, Isao Kimura	1964		Awards: 1 Blue Ribbon Award
Shinobi no Mono 5: Mist Saizo Returns	Kazuo Ikehiro	Raizō Ichikawa, Yukiko Fuji, Shiho Fujimura	1964	1616	
Samurai Assassin	Kihachi Okamoto	Toshirō Mifune, Koshiro Matsumoto, Yunosuke Ito, Michiyo Aratama	1965		
Kwaidan	Masaki Kobayashi	Rentarō Mikuni, Keiko Kishi, Michiyo Aratama, Misako Watanabe, Tatsuya Nakadai	1965		
Sleepy Eyes of Death: Sword of Fire	Kenji Misumi	Raizō Ichikawa, Tamao Nakamura, Sanae Nakahara	1965		
Red Beard	Akira Kurosawa	Toshirō Mifune, Yūzō Kayama	1965		
Zatoichi's Revenge	Akira Inoue	Shintarō Katsu, Norihei Miki, Mikiko Tsubouchi	1965		
Sleepy Eyes of Death: Sword of Satan	Kimiyoshi Yasuda	Raizō Ichikawa, Michiko Saga, Machiko Hasegawa	1965		
Shinobi no Mono 6: Iga Mansion	Kazuo Mori	Raizō Ichikawa, Kaoru Yachigusa, Isao Yamagata	1965	1637–1651	
Samurai Spy	Masahiro Shinoda	Kōji Takahashi	1965		
Muhōmatsu no isshō	Kenji Misumi	Shintarō Katsu, Ineko Arima, Ken Utsui	1965		
Yotsuya Kaidan	Shirō Toyoda	Tatsuya Nakadai, Mariko Okada, Junko Ikeuchi	1965		
Miyamoto Musashi: Musashi vs. Kojiro	Tomu Uchida	Kinnosuke Nakamura, Ken Takakura, Wakaba Irie	1965		
Zatoichi and the Doomed Man	Kazuo Mori	Shintarō Katsu, Kanbi Fujiyama, Eiko Taki	1965		
Sword of the Beast	Hideo Gosha	Mikijirō Hira, Go Kato	1965		
Akuto	Kaneto Shindō	Eitarō Ozawa, Kyoko Kishida	1965		
Zatoichi and the Chess Expert	Kenji Misumi	Shintarō Katsu, Mikio Narita, Chizu Hayashi	1965		
Shinobi no Mono 7: Mist Saizo Strikes Back	Kazuo Mori	Raizō Ichikawa, Shiho Fujimura, Yūko Kusunoki	1966	1616	
The Sword of Doom	Kihachi Okamoto	Tatsuya Nakadai, Yūzō Kayama, Michiyo Aratama, Toshirō Mifune	1966		Based on the novel of the same name.
Sleepy Eyes of Death: The Mask of the Princess	Akira Inoue	Raizō Ichikawa, Yaeko Mizutani, Ichirō Nakatani	1966		
Kutsukake Tokijiro: Yukyo Ippiki	Tai Katō	Kinnosuke Nakamura, Kiyoshi Atsumi, Junko Ikeuchi	1966		
Daimajin	Kimiyoshi Yasuda	Miwa Takada, Yoshihiko Aoyama, Jun Fujimaki	1966		
Zatoichi's Vengeance	Tokuzō Tanaka	Shintarō Katsu, Shigeru Amachi, Jun Hamamura	1966		
Zatoichi's Pilgrimage	Kazuo Ikehiro	Shintarō Katsu, Michiyo Ōkusu, Kunie Tanaka	1966		
Sleepy Eyes of Death: Sword of Villainy	Kenji Misumi	Raizō Ichikawa, Shigeru Amachi, Shiho Fujimura	1966		
Samurai Wolf	Hideo Gosha	Isao Natsuyagi, Ryōhei Uchida, Junko Miyazono	1966		
The Blazing Sword	Hirokazu Ichimura	Tetsuko Kobayashi, Asahi Kurizuka, Shun'ya Wazaki	1966		
Shinobi no Mono 8: Three Enemies	Kazuo Ikehiro	Raizō Ichikawa, Manami Fuji, Michiyo Ōkusu	1966	1570–1573	
The Magic Serpent	Tetsuya Yamauchi	Hiroki Matsukata, Tomoko Ogawa, Ryūtarō Ōtomo	1966		
Band of Ninja	Nagisa Oshima	Yoshiyuki Fukuda, Toshirō Hayano, Hikaru Hayashi	1967		
Bakumatsu: Tenamonya daizōdō	Kengo Furusawa	Makoto Fujita, Minoru Shiraki, Kei Tani	1967		
Samurai Wolf II	Hideo Gosha	Isao Natsuyagi, Ichirō Nakatani, Bin Amatsu	1967		
Samurai Rebellion	Masaki Kobayashi	Toshirō Mifune, Yoko Tsukasa	1967		
Sleepy Eyes of Death: A Trail of Traps	Kazuo Ikehiro	Raizō Ichikawa, Nobuo Kaneko	1967		
Zatoichi the Outlaw	Satsuo Yamamoto	Shintarō Katsu, Rentarō Mikuni, Kō Nishimura	1967		
Zenigata Heiji	Tetsuya Yamauchi	Kazuo Funaki, Asao Koike, Akitake Kōno	1967		
The Wife of Seishu Hanaoka	Yasuzō Masumura	Raizō Ichikawa, Ayako Wakao, Hideko Takamine	1967		Based on the novel of the same name.
Eleven Samurai	Eiichi Kudo	Isao Natsuyagi, Kōtarō Satomi, Kōji Nanbara	1967		
Zatoichi Challenged	Kenji Misumi	Shintarō Katsu, Jūshirō Konoe, Miwa Takada	1967		
Sleepy Eyes of Death: Hell Is a Woman	Tokuzō Tanaka	Raizō Ichikawa, Miwa Takada, Yaeko Mizutani	1968		
Kuroneko	Kaneto Shindō	Kichiemon Nakamura, Nobuko Otowa, Kei Satō	1968		Awards: 2 Mainichi Film Concours
Sleepy Eyes of Death: In the Spider's Lair	Kimiyoshi Yasuda	Raizō Ichikawa, Mako Midori, Maka Sarijo	1968		
The Saga of Tanegashima	Kazuo Mori	Rick Jason, Ayako Wakao, Eijirō Tōno, Shiho Fujimura, Jun Fujimaki	1968	1543	
Botan Dōrō	Satsuo Yamamoto	Miyoko Akaza, Kōjirō Hongō, Hajime Koshikawa	1968		Based on the short story of the same name.
Kill!	Kihachi Okamoto	Tatsuya Nakadai, Etsushi Takahashi, Naoko Kubo, Shigeru Kōyama	1968		
The Silent Stranger	Luigi Vanzi	Tony Anthony, Kenji Ohara, Rita Mura, Lloyd Battista	1968	1865	
Sleepy Eyes of Death: Castle Menagerie	Kazuo Ikehiro	Raizō Ichikawa, Naoko Kubo, Shiho Fujimura	1969		
Samurai Banners	Hiroshi Inagaki	Toshirō Mifune, Kinnosuke Yorozuya, Akihiko Hirata	1969		
Crimson Bat, the Blind Swordswoman	Sadatsugu Matsuda	Yōko Matsuyama, Chizuko Arai, Jun Tatara	1969		
Goyokin	Hideo Gosha	Tatsuya Nakadai, Kinnosuke Nakamura, Tetsurō Tamba	1969		Awards: 2 Mainichi Film Concours
Double Suicide	Masahiro Shinoda	Kichiemon Nakamura, Shima Iwashita	1969		Based on the play of the same name.
The Devil's Temple	Kenji Misumi	Shintarō Katsu, Hideko Takamine, Michiyo Aratama	1969		
Hitokiri	Hideo Gosha	Shintaro Katsu, Tatsuya Nakadai, Yukio Mishima	1969		
Portrait of Hell	Shirō Toyoda	Hideyo Amamoto, Yōko Naitō, Tatsuya Nakadai	1969		
Red Lion	Kihachi Okamoto	Toshirō Mifune, Shima Iwashita	1969	1867–1868	
Tengu-to	Satsuo Yamamoto	Tatsuya Nakadai, Ayako Wakao, Gō Katō	1969		
Shinsengumi	Tadashi Sawashima	Toshirō Mifune, Keiju Kobayashi, Kinya Kitaoji, Rentarō Mikuni, Yoko Tsukasa	1969		
The Fort of Death	Eiichi Kudō	Kanjūrō Arashi, Hideo Fujimoto, Teruo Fujinaga	1969		
Zatoichi meets Yojimbo	Kihachi Okamoto	Toshirō Mifune, Shintarō Katsu, Ayako Wakao	1970		
Mission: Iron Castle	Kazuo Mori	Hiroki Matsukata, Ryūnosuke Minegishi, Kōjirō Hongō, Michiyo Yasuda, Yōko Namikawa, Shiho Fujimura	1970	1582	
Bakumatsu	Daisuke Itō	Kinnosuke Nakamura, Toshirō Mifune, Keiju Kobayashi	1970		
The Ambush: Incident at Blood Pass	Hiroshi Inagaki	Toshirō Mifune, Yūjirō Ishihara, Ruriko Asaoka	1970		
Zatoichi Goes to the Fire Festival	Kenji Misumi	Shintarō Katsu, Reiko Ōhara, Pîtâ	1970		
Zatoichi Meets the One-Armed Swordsman	Kimiyoshi Yasuda	Shintarō Katsu, Yu Wang, Watako Hamaki	1971		Awards: 1 Mainichi Film Concours
Miyamoto Musashi: Swords of Death	Tomu Uchida	Kinnosuke Nakamura, Rentarō Mikuni, Teruo Matsuyama	1971		Awards: 1 Golden Charybdis
En toiu onna	Tadashi Imai	Shinjirō Ehara, Shima Iwashita, Yoshi Katō	1971		
Inochi bō ni furō (Inn of Evil)	Masaki Kobayashi	Tatsuya Nakadai, Komaki Kurihara, Wakako Sakai	1971		Awards: 5 Mainichi Film Concours, 1 Taormina International Film Festival Award
Silence	Masahiro Shinoda	David Lampson, Mako Iwamatsu, Tetsurō Tanba, Shima Iwashita, Yoshiko Mita, Eiji Okada, Rokkō Toura, Noboru Matsuhashi	1971	1638	Based on the novel of the same name.
Zatoichi at Large	Kazuo Mori	Shintarō Katsu, Rentarō Mikuni, Hisaya Morishige	1972		Awards: 1 Mainichi Film Concours
Lone Wolf and Cub: Sword of Vengeance	Kenji Misumi	Tomisaburō Wakayama, Fumio Watanabe, Tomoko Mayama	1972	1655	
Lone Wolf and Cub: Baby Cart at the River Styx	Kenji Misumi	Tomisaburō Wakayama, Kayo Matsuo, Akiji Kobayashi	1972		
Lone Wolf and Cub: Baby Cart to Hades	Kenji Misumi	Tomisaburō Wakayama, Gō Katō, Yūko Hama	1972		
Shadow Hunters	Toshio Masuda	Yūjirō Ishihara, Ruriko Asaoka, Ryōhei Uchida	1972		Based on the manga series of the same name.
Kogarashi Monjirō	Sadao Nakajima	Bunta Sugawara, Gorō Ibuki, Takayuki Akutagawa	1972		
Zatoichi in Desperation	Shintarō Katsu	Shintarō Katsu, Kiwako Taichi, Kyoko Yoshizawa	1972		
Kogarashi Monjirō: kakawari gozansen	Sadao Nakajima	Bunta Sugawara, Etsuko Ichihara, Kunie Tanaka	1972		
Shadow Hunters 2: Echo of Destiny	Toshio Masuda	Yūjirō Ishihara, Ryōhei Uchida, Mikio Narita	1972		Based on the manga series of the same name.
Lone Wolf and Cub: Baby Cart in Peril	Takeichi Saitō	Tomisaburō Wakayama, Yoichi Hayashi, Michi Azuma	1972		
Hanzo the Razor: Sword of Justice	Kenji Misumi	Shintaro Katsu	1972		
Hanzo the Razor: The Snare	Yasuzo Masumura	Shintaro Katsu	1973		
Lone Wolf and Cub: Baby Cart in the Land of Demons	Kenji Misumi	Tomisaburō Wakayama, Michiyo Ōkusu, Akihiro Tomikawa	1973		
Hanzo the Razor: Who's Got the Gold?	Yoshio Inoue	Shintaro Katsu	1974		
Lone Wolf and Cub: White Heaven in Hell	Yoshiyuki Kuroda	Tomisaburō Wakayama, Akihiro Tomikawa, Junko Hitomi	1974		
Ryoma Ansatsu	Kazuo Kuroki	Yoshio Harada, Yūsaku Matsuda, Renji Ishibashi, Kaori Momoi	1974		
Himiko (卑弥呼)	Masahiro Shinoda	Shima Iwashita, Masao Kusakari, Rie Yokoyama	1974	3rd century	Experimental film about the ancient queen, Himiko
Shogun's Samurai	Kinji Fukasaku	Kinnosuke Yorozuya, Shinichi Chiba, Hiroki Matsukata	1978	1623–1624	
The Love Suicides at Sonezaki	Yasuzo Masumura	Ryudo Uzaki, Meiko Kaji	1978		Based on the play of the same name.
Bandits vs. Samurai Squadron	Hideo Gosha	Tatsuya Nakadai, Junko Miyashita	1978		
Swords of Vengeance: The Fall of Ako Castle	Kinji Fukasaku	Kinnosuke Yorozuya, Shinichi Chiba, Hiroki Matsukata, Tetsurō Tamba, Toshirō Mifune	1978		
Hunter in the Dark	Hideo Gosha	Tatsuya Nakadai, Tetsurō Tamba, Yoshio Harada	1979		Awards: 1 Japanese Academy Award
The Shogun Assassins	Sadao Nakajima	Hiroki Matsukata, Kinnosuke Nakamura, Ichirō Ogura	1979		Awards: 1 Japanese Academy Award
G.I. Samurai	Kōsei Saitō	Shinichi Chiba	1979		Time Travel film.
Kagemusha	Akira Kurosawa	Tatsuya Nakadai	1980		Awards: 2 BAFTA Awards, 1 César Award, 2 David di Donatello Awards, 1 Palme d'Or
Tokugawa ichizoku no hōkai	Kōsaku Yamashita	Kinnosuke Nakamura, Hiroki Matsukata, Mikijirō Hira	1980		
Shōgun	Jerry London	Richard Chamberlain, Toshirō Mifune, Yoko Shimada	1980	1600	American TV mini-series based on the novel by James Clavell, loosely based on William Adams, the English navigator who served as a key advisor to Tokugawa Ieyasu beginning in 1600.
Shogun Assassin	Robert Houston	Tomisaburo Wakayama	1980		English dubbed edit/compilation of the first two 1972 Lone Wolf and Cub films.
Shogun's Ninja	Noribumi Suzuki	Hiroyuki Sanada, Shinichi Chiba, Etsuko Shihomi	1980		
Sekigahara	Shin'ichi Kamoshita, Ichiro Takahashi	Hisaya Morishige, Gō Katō, Rentarō Mikuni, Toshirō Mifune	1981		Japanese TV mini-series that aired over 3 consecutive nights.
Kazunomiya-sama otome	Kenji Sawai	Shinobu Ōtake, Mitsuko Mori, Kimiko Ikegami	1981		Television film
Eijanaika	Shohei Imamura	Kaori Momoi, Shigeru Izumiya, Ken Ogata	1981		
Shikake-nin Baian	Yasuo Furuhata	Katsuo Nakamura	1981		
Samurai Reincarnation	Kinji Fukasaku	Shinichi Chiba, Kenji Sawada	1981	1637–1638	
Edo Porn	Kaneto Shindō	Ken Ogata, Toshiyuki Nishida, Yūko Tanaka	1981		Awards: 1 Blue Ribbon Award, 1 Hochi Film Award, 2 Japanese Academy Awards, 1 Yokohama Film Festival Award
The Bushido Blade	Tom Kotani	Shinichi Chiba, Frank Converse, Mako Iwamatsu, Laura Gemser James Earl Jones, Toshirō Mifune	1981	1854	About the forced Opening of Japan in 1854.
Ninja Wars	Kōsei Saitō	Hiroyuki Sanada, Noriko Watanabe, Jun Miho	1982		Awards: 3 Japanese Academy Awards
The Ballad of Narayama	Shōhei Imamura	Ken Ogata, Sumiko Sakamoto, Tonpei Hidari	1983		Awards: 1 Blue Ribbon Award, 1 Hochi Film Award, 3 Japanese Academy Awards, 2 Mainichi Film Concours, 1 Palme d'Or
Legend of the Eight Samurai	Kinji Fukasaku	Hiroko Yakushimaru, Hiroyuki Sanada, Shinichi Chiba	1983		
Hissatsu!	Masahisa Sadanaga	Makoto Fujita, Kunihiko Mitamura, Izumi Ayukawa	1984		
Onna goroshi abura no jigoku	Ben Wada	Yūsaku Matsuda, Tomoko Ogawa, Jiro Sakagami	1984		Television film
Ran	Akira Kurosawa	Tatsuya Nakadai, Akira Terao, Jinpachi Nezu, Daisuke Ryu, Mieko Harada	1985	16th century	Awards: 2 BAFTA Awards
Gonza the Spearman	Masahiro Shinoda	Hiromi Go, Shohei Hino, Shima Iwashita	1986		Awards: 1 Silver Bear
Bakumatsu seishun graffiti: Ronin Sakamoto Ryoma	Yoshitaka Kawai	Tetsuya Takeda, Toshio Shiba, Takuro Yoshida	1986		Awards: 1 Hochi Film Award
Shogun's Shadow	Yasuo Furuhata	Ken Ogata, Norihito Arai, Toshihiro Asari	1989		
Rikyu	Hiroshi Teshigahara	Rentarō Mikuni, Tsutomu Yamazaki	1989		
Death of a Tea Master	Kei Kumai	Eiji Okuda, Toshirō Mifune, Kinnosuke Nakamura	1989		Awards: 1 Japanese Academy Award, 1 Kinema Junpo Award, 1 Nikkan Sports Film Award, 1 Silver Hugo, 1 Silver Lion
Heaven and Earth	Haruki Kadokawa	Enoki Takaaki, Tsugawa Masahiko, Asano Atsuko, Zaizen Naomi, Nomura Hironobu	1990		
Sengoku Ransei no Abarenbo Saito Dosan Doto no Tenka Tori	Eiichi Kudō	Kumiko Akiyoshi, Shinichi Chiba, Ken Matsudaira	1991		Television film
Journey of Honor	Gordon Hessler	Sho Kosugi, David Essex, Kane Kosugi, Toshirō Mifune	1991	1600–1602	Loosely based on the journey of samurai Hasekura Tsunenaga and his delegation to Spain in 1613.
Bakumatsu Jyunjyoden	Mitsuyuki Yakushiji	Ken Watanabe, Riho Makise, Tetta Sugimoto	1991		
Mangetsu: Mr. Moonlight	Kazuki Ohmori	Saburō Tokitō, Bin Amatsu, Leo Morimoto	1991		Time Travel film.
Gō-hime	Hiroshi Teshigahara	Rie Miyazawa, Tatsuya Nakadai, Toshiya Nagasawa	1992		Awards: 2 Japanese Academy Awards
The Oil-Hell Murder	Hideo Gosha	Kanako Higuchi, Shin'ichi Tsutsumi	1992		
Ihen kaidō	Kōsei Saitō	Ikkō Furuya, Mariko Fuji, Shōhei Hino	1993		Television film
Kaettekite Kogarashi Monjiro	Kon Ichikawa	Atsuo Nakamura, Ryōko Sakaguchi, Ittoku Kishibe	1993		
Crest of Betrayal	Kinji Fukasaku	Kōichi Satō, Saki Takaoka, Keiko Oginome, Tsunehiko Watase, Eriko Watanabe	1994		
47 Ronin	Kon Ichikawa	Ken Takakura, Kiichi Nakai	1994		
Sharaku	Masahiro Shinoda	Hiroyuki Sanada, Frankie Sakai, Shima Iwashita, Tsurutarō Kataoka	1995		
Bungo torimono ezu – Harikomi	Keiichi Ozawa	Hashinosuke Nakamura, Kinnosuke Nakamura, Sayuri Kokushō	1996		Television film
Reborn From Hell: Samurai Armageddon	Kazumasa Shirai	Hiroyuki Watanabe, Tomorowo Taguchi, Yūko Moriyama	1996		Remake of the 1981 film Samurai Reincarnation.
Legend of the Devil	Masaru Tsushima	Masaki Kyōmoto, Atsuo Nakamura, Daisuke Ryū	1996		
Samurai Fiction: Episode One	Hiroyuki Nakano	Morio Kazama, Mitsuru Fukikoshi, Tomoyasu Hotei	1998		Awards: 1 Mainichi Film Concours, 1 Puchon International Fantastic Film Festival Award, 2 Sitges Awards
Kunoichi ninpō-chō: Yagyū gaiden, Edo-bana jigoku-hen	Hitoshi Ozawa	Hitoshi Ozawa, Yūko Moriyama	1998		
After the Rain	Takashi Koizumi	Akira Terao, Yoshiko Miyazaki, Shiro Mifune, Mieko Harada, Tatsuya Nakadai	1999		
Owls' Castle	Masahiro Shinoda	Kiichi Nakai, Mayu Tsuruta, Riona Hazuki	1999		Based on the novel under the same name.
Gohatto	Nagisa Oshima	Ryuhei Matsuda, Takeshi Kitano, Tadanobu Asano	1999		
Dora-Heita	Kon Ichikawa	Kōji Yakusho, Yūko Asano, Tsurutarō Kataoka	2000		
Gojoe	Sogo Ishii	Tadanobu Asano, Masatoshi Nagase, Daisuke Ryu, Jun Kunimura	2000		Awards: 1 Hochi Film Award
Onmyoji	Yōjirō Takita	Mansai Nomura, Hideaki Ito, Hiroyuki Sanada	2001		
Chūshingura 1/47	Shunsaku Kawamo	Takuya Kimura, Kōichi Satō	2001		Television film. Remake of the 1932 film Chūshingura – Zempen: Akahokyō no maki.
Kewaishi	Mitsutoshi Tanaka	Kippei Shîna, Miho Kanno, Chizuru Ikewaki	2002		Awards: 1 Tokyo International Film Festival Award
Kumamoto Stories	Takashi Miike	Tōru Emori, Renji Ishibashi, Jinpachi Nezu, Mikijirō Hira, Mihoko Abe, Noriko Aota, Ayumi Asakura	2002		Includes 3 short films: Onna Kunishuu Ikki, Kikuchi-jo Monogatari: Sakimori-tachi no Uta, and Zuiketsu Genso: Tonkararin Yume Densetsu.
The Sea Is Watching	Kei Kumai	Misa Shimizu, Nagiko Tōno, Masatoshi Nagase	2002		
Ryoma's Wife, Her Husband and Her Lover	Jun Ichikawa	Noritake Kinashi, Kiichi Nakai, Kyōka Suzuki	2002		Awards: 1 Nikkan Sports Film Award
Sabu	Takashi Miike	Tatsuya Fujiwara, Satoshi Tsumabuki	2002		Television film
The Twilight Samurai	Yoji Yamada	Hiroyuki Sanada, Rie Miyazawa	2002		Awards: 12 Japanese Academy Awards
When the Last Sword Is Drawn	Yōjirō Takita	Kiichi Nakai, Kōichi Satō, Yui Natsukawa, Takehiro Murata	2003		
Aragami	Ryuhei Kitamura	Takao Osawa, Masaya Kato, Kanae Uotani, Tak Sakaguchi, Hideo Sakaki	2003		Awards: 1 Silver Raven
Makai Tenshō	Hideyuki Hirayama	Yōsuke Kubozuka, Kumiko Asō, Tetta Sugimoto	2003		
Azumi	Ryuhei Kitamura	Aya Ueto	2003		Based on the manga series of the same name.
Zatōichi	Takeshi Kitano	Beat Takeshi, Tadanobu Asano, Yui Natsukawa	2003		
Onmyoji 2	Yōjirō Takita	Mansai Nomura, Hideaki Itō, Eriko Imai, Kyoko Fukada, Hayato Ichihara	2003		
The Last Samurai	Edward Zwick	Tom Cruise, Timothy Spall, Ken Watanabe, Billy Connolly, Tony Goldwyn, Hiroyuki Sanada, Koyuki, Shin Koyamada	2003	1877	Fictional story based around the Satsuma Rebellion during the Meiji period.
Warau Iemon	Yukio Ninagawa	Toshiaki Karasawa, Koyuki, Teruyuki Kagawa, Hiroyuki Ikeuchi	2004		Awards: 2 Asia-Pacific Film Festival Awards, 1 Nikkan Sports Film Award
Kibakichi	Tomo'o Haraguchi	Ryūji Harada, Nozomi Andō, Tatsuo Higashida	2004		
Kibakichi 2	Tomo'o Haraguchi	Ryūji Harada, Miki Tanaka, Aimi Nakajima	2004		
Izo	Takashi Miike	Kazuya Nakayama, Takeshi Kitano, Bob Sapp	2004		
The Hidden Blade	Yoji Yamada	Masatoshi Nagase, Takako Matsu, Yukiyoshi Ozawa	2004		
Azumi 2: Death or Love	Shusuke Kaneko	Aya Ueto	2005		Based on the manga series of the same name.
Ashura	Yōjirō Takita	Somegorō Ichikawa, Rie Miyazawa, Kanako Higuchi	2005		Awards: 1 Hochi Film Award, 1 Kinema Junpo Award, 1 Nikkan Sports Film Award, 1 Yokohama Film Festival Award
Samurai Commando: Mission 1549	Masaaki Tezuka	Yōsuke Eguchi, Kyōka Suzuki, Haruka Ayase	2005		Awards: 1 Asia-Pacific Film Festival Award
Hana	Hirokazu Koreeda	Jun'ichi Okada, Rie Miyazawa, Arata Furuta	2006		Awards: 1 Nikkan Sports Film Award
Love and Honor	Yoji Yamada	Kimura Takuya, Dan Rei, Takashi Sasano	2006		
Kaidan	Hideo Nakata	Kumiko Asō, Takaaki Enoki, Reona Hirota	2007		Awards: 1 Yokohama Film Festival Award
Sukiyaki Western Django	Takashi Miike	Hideaki Ito, Kōichi Satō, Yusuke Iseya	2007		
Chacha	Hajime Hashimoto	Ryōko Gi, Mieko Harada, Takehiro Hira	2007		
Yamazakura	Tetsuo Shinohara	Rena Tanaka, Noriyuki Higashiyama, Tetsuya Chiba	2008		
Geisha Assassin	Gō Ohara	Minami Tsukui, Shigeru Kanai, Nao Nagasawa	2008		
Ichi	Fumihiko Sori	Takao Osawa, Haruka Ayase, Shido Nakamura, Yōsuke Kubozuka	2008		
Samurai Avenger: The Blind Wolf	Kurando Mitsutake	Kurando Mitsutake, Jeffrey James Lippold, Domiziano Arcangeli	2009		
Ballad: Na mo naki koi no uta	Takashi Yamazaki	Tsuyoshi Kusanagi, Yui Aragaki, Akashi Takei	2009		
Castle Under Fiery Skies	Mitsutoshi Tanaka	Toshiyuki Nishida, Shōzō Endō, Saki Fukuda	2009		
Sword of Desperation	Hideyuki Hirayama	Etsushi Toyokawa, Chizuru Ikewaki, Koji Kikkawa	2010		
13 Assassins	Takashi Miike	Kōji Yakusho, Takayuki Yamada, Yūsuke Iseya, Goro Inagaki, Masachika Ichimura, Mikijirō Hira	2010		Remake of the 1963 film 13 Assassins.
Ōoku	Fuminori Kaneko	Ko Shibasaki, Kazunari Ninomiya, Hiroshi Tamaki	2010		Based on the manga series of the same name.
The Sakurada Gate Incident	Junya Sato	Takao Ohsawa, Kyoko Hasegawa, Minosuke Bandō	2010		
Abacus and Sword	Yoshimitsu Morita	Masato Sakai, Yukie Nakama, Kimimaro Ayanokōji	2010		
Yamada: The Samurai of Ayothaya	Nopporn Watin	Seigi Ozeki, Kanokkorn Jaicheun, Sorapong Chatree	2010		Awards: 1 Thailand National Film Association Award
The Winter Butterfly	Marcus Tozini	Sam Aoyama, Ikuma Isaac Fryman, Sharon Gee, Emi Ikehata	2010		
At River's Edge	Tetsuo Shinohara	Noriyuki Higashiyama, Rinko Kikuchi	2011		
Scabbard Samurai	Hitoshi Matsumoto	Masatō Ibu, Jun Kunimura, Itsuji Itao	2011		
Hara-Kiri: Death of a Samurai	Takashi Miike	Ichikawa Ebizō XI, Eita, Kōji Yakusho	2011		Remake of the 1962 film Harakiri.
Shinobido	Toshiyuki Morioka	Aimi Satsukawa, Ryōichi Yuki, Ayaka Kikuchi	2012		
The Dry Blade	Michael Fredianelli	Michael Nosé, Henry Lee, Carl Schreiber	2012		
Rurouni Kenshin	Keishi Ōtomo	Takeru Sato, Emi Takei	2012		Based on the manga series of the same name.
The Floating Castle	Shinji Higuchi and Isshin Inudo	Mansai Nomura	2012	Late 16th century	Set in feudal Japan, the film is based on the Siege of Oshi and depicts the struggle of Oshi's villagers in defending their fortress against Toyotomi Hideyoshi's campaign against the Hojo clan.
Unforgiven	Lee Sang-il	Ken Watanabe, Kōichi Satō, Akira Emoto	2013		Based on the 1992 American western of the same name.
Mission Impossible: Samurai	Katsuhide Motoki	Kuranosuke Sasaki, Kyoko Fukada, Tsuyoshi Ihara	2014		
Zakurozaka no Adauchi	Setsurō Wakamatsu	Kiichi Nakai, Hiroshi Abe, Ryōko Hirosue	2014		
Kakekomi	Masato Harada	Yo Oizumi, Erika Toda, Hikari Mitsushima	2015		
Masterless	Craig Shimahara	Adam LaVorgna	2015		
Silence	Martin Scorsese	Andrew Garfield, Adam Driver, Tadanobu Asano, Ciarán Hinds, Liam Neeson	2016	1630s–1638	Based on the novel of the same name.
Sekigahara	Masato Harada	Junichi Okada, Kasumi Arimura, Takehiro Hira, Masahiro Higashide, Kōji Yakusho	2017	1600	Based on a novel by Ryōtarō Shiba about the Battle of Sekigahara.

==== Gendai-geki films ====
Gendai-geki (現劇) is a genre of film and television or theater play in Japan. Unlike the jidai-geki genre of period dramas, whose stories are set in the Edo period, gendaigeki stories are contemporary dramas set in the modern world.

Title	Release date	Time period	Notes on setting
Laughing Under the Clouds	2018	1868–1912	Based on a manga series, set from the Meiji period to the Taishō period, including the life of the Emperor Meiji during the Meiji Restoration.
Lady Snowblood	1973	1874–1894	Based on the manga series of the same name.
Waga Koi wa Moenu	1949	1880s	
Emperor Meiji and the Great Russo-Japanese War	1958	1904–1905	Dramatization of the Russo-Japanese War.
Fullmetal Alchemist	2017	1927	Based on a manga series, set during the Benito Mussolini's regime.
Gambler's Life: Unstoppable Bloodbath	1969	1930s	Set in the early Shōwa period.
Flower of Chivalry Torn Asunder: Gambling Heir	1969	1930s	Set in the early Shōwa period.
Onna jigoku uta: Shakuhachi benten	1970		
Tora! Tora! Tora!	1970	1941	Detailing the events leading up to and including the Attack on Pearl Harbor in 1941.
Midway	1976	1942	About the Battle of Midway between Japan and the United States in 1942.
The Bridge on the River Kwai	1957	1942–1945	About allied prisoners of war forced to work on the Burma Railway during World War II.
Letters from Iwo Jima	2006	1945	Japanese-language film directed by Clint Eastwood about the Battle of Iwo Jima in 1945.
Hiroshima	1995	1945	Docu-drama about the events leading up to the use of the first atomic weapons in 1945.
Fueled: The Man They Called Pirate	2016	1945–1960	Based on a novel, from the Occupation of Japan to the 1960 U-2 incident during the Cold War era and the Japanese economic miracle.
Kids on the Slope	2018	1966–1978	Based on a manga series, set during the foundation of the Asian Development Bank to the opening of Narita International Airport, part of the Cold War era.
Destiny: The Tale of Kamakura	2017	1976–1980	Based on the manga, set from the Lockheed bribery scandals to the 1980 Summer Olympics boycott, part of the Cold War era.
Climber's High and Shizumanu Taiyō	2008–2009	1985	Historical dramas about the Japan Airlines Flight 123 incident.
Sadako vs. Kayako	2016	2004–2009	Based on Ring Trilogy and Ju-On by Koji Suzuki and Takashi Shimizu, one of the horror franchises in Japan.

=== Korean and South Korean history ===
Sortable table
Title	Release date	Time period	Notes on setting
The Great Battle	2018	645	Set during the Siege of Ansi.
Once Upon a Time in a Battlefield	2003	660	Set during the Battle of Hwangsanbeol.
A Frozen Flower	2008	1330–1374	Set during the late Goryeo dynasty.
Empire of Lust	2015	14th century	Set during the reign of King Taejo.
Musa (film)	2001	1375	A story about diplomatic mission from the Goryeo travels to Ming China.
The Divine Weapon	2008	1418–1450	Set during the reign of Sejong the Great.
The King and the Clown	2005	1494–1506	Set during the reign of Yeonsangun of Joseon.
Blades of Blood	2010	1500s	Set during the 16th century.
The Admiral: Roaring Currents	2014	1597	Depicts the Battle of Myeongnyang, a naval battle between Japan and Korea.
Shadows in the Palace	2007	1600s	Set during the 17th century.
Sword in the Moon	2003	c. 1600	Set during the beginning of the 17th century.
War of the Arrows	2011	1636–37	Set during the second Manchu invasion of Korea.
The Fortress	2017	1636	Set during the second Manchu invasion of Korea.
The Sword with No Name	2009	1860s–1870s	Set during the 19th century, fictionalized account of the reign of Empress Myeongseong
Chi-hwa-seon	2002	1843–97	About the life of Korean painter Oh-won.
The Sound of a Flower	2015	1867–84	About the life of the Korean pansori singer Shin Jae-hyo.
The Good, the Bad, the Weird	2008	1920–1930	Loosely based on the seizure of 150,000 won in Manchuria.
The Last Princess	2016	1925–1962	About the life of Princess Deokhye.
Love, Lies	2016	1943–1945	Set during Korea under Japanese rule and World War II.
The Taebaek Mountains	1994	1948–1950	Set during the Yeosu–Suncheon rebellion and the Korean War
Taegukgi	2004	1950–1953	Set during the Korean War.
Welcome to Dongmakgol	2005	1950–1953	Set during the Korean War.
71: Into the Fire	2010	1950–1953	Set during the Korean War.
The Front Line	2011	1953	Set during the Korean Armistice Agreement.
Gangnam Blues	2014	1966–1970	Set in the late 1960s to the 1970s about the development of Gangnam during the Park Chung-hee's regime.
Silmido	2003	1970s	Based on a military uprising on Silmido island.
A Taxi Driver	2017	1980	Set during the Gwangju Uprising after the assassination of Park Chung-hee.
1987: When the Day Comes	2017	1987–1990	Set during the June Struggle to the Revolutions of 1989.

== Southeast Asia ==
=== Filipino history ===
Sortable table
Title	Release date	Time period	Setting	Notes
Banaue: Stairway to the Sky	1975	c. 500 BC	Philippines	The film depicts the Prehistory of the Philippines, and the construction of the Banaue Rice Terraces.
Lapu-Lapu	1955	1491–1542	Philippines	Chronicles the life of Lapu-Lapu and death of Ferdinand Magellan.
Lapu-Lapu	2002	1491–1542	Philippines	A remake of the 1955 film that chronicles the life of Lapu-Lapu.
José Rizal	1998	1861–1896	Philippines	A biographical film focusing on the Philippine National Hero, José Rizal.
Ganito Kami Noon, Paano Kayo Ngayon?	1970	1870–1895	Philippines	A period drama film that focuses on the Hispanicized Society of the Philippines during the colonial period.
Bonifacio: Ang Unang Pangulo	2014	1872–1897	Philippines	A biographical film chronicling the life of Andres Bonifacio from his founding of the Katipunan to his eventual execution.
El Presidente	2012	1886–1962	Philippines	A biographical film about the first Filipino president Emilio Aguinaldo.
Felix Manalo	2015	1886–1963	Philippines	A biographical film about Felix Manalo, founder and pioneer executive minister of the Iglesia ni Cristo.
Baler	2008	1898	Philippines	A romantic drama film set during the Siege of Baler.
Tiniente Rosario	1937	1898–1901	Philippines	A film about the Philippine Revolutionary Army and its female Sergeant officer.
Heneral Luna	2015	1898–1903	Philippines	An epic war film detailing General Antonio Luna's leadership of the Filipino army during the Philippine–American War.
Aguila	1980	1899–1945	Philippines	Touted at the time as "the biggest event in local movie history" and "the biggest Filipino film ever made".
Tirad Pass: The Story of Gen. Gregorio del Pilar	1997	December 2, 1899	Philippines	A movie about the Battle of Tirad Pass, a Philippine Campaign against Americans led by General Gregorio Del Pilar.
Amigo	2010	1900s	Philippines	A film set during Philippine–American War
Rosario	2010	1920s	Philippines	Depicts the life of Rosario (Manuel V. Pangilinan's grandmother), a girl during the Insular Government Period.
Santiago!	1970	1941–1945	Philippines	Depicting the Philippine campaign during World War II
Aishite Imasu 1941: Mahal Kita	2004	1941–1945	Philippines	About the Japanese Occupation of the Philippines in World War II
Tatlong Taong Walang Diyos	1972	1942–1945	Philippines	Movie set in Philippines during World War II
Alab ng Lahi	2003	1945	Philippines	The film depicts the Filipino Guerillas during the end of World War II led by Gregorio Magtangol and the friendship between a Japanese and Filipino soldier.
Manila Kingpin: The Asiong Salonga Story	2011	1951	Philippines	The criminal life of Asiong Salonga that led to his assassination on October 7, 1951.
Boy Golden: Shoot to Kill, the Arturo Porcuna Story	2013	1960s	Philippines	The life and death of Arturo "Boy Golden" Porcuna, who rose through the Manila underworld in the 1960s until his eventual murder.
Dekada '70	2002	1970s	Philippines	Based on the novel of the same name by Lualhati Bautista. The setting of the film is set during the period of Martial law.

=== Mainland Southeast Asia ===
Sortable table
Title	Release date	Time period	Setting	Notes
The Killing Fields	1984	1973–1979	Cambodia	About the Khmer Rouge regime in Cambodia. The film begins in 1973.
First They Killed My Father	2017	1975	Cambodia	Set during the takeover of Phnom Penh by Khmer Rouge and the lives of captives in the jungle.
Never Shall We Be Enslaved	1997	1885	Myanmar	A two-part film depicting the events of the Third Anglo-Burmese War and the fall of Thibaw Min and his dynasty.
The Legend of Suriyothai	2001	1520s–1548	Thailand	The film is follows the course of the life of Queen Suriyothai, who given up her life in the defense of her husband, King Maha Chakkraphat, in a battle during the Burmese–Siamese War (1547–1549).
King Naresuan	2007	1555–1592	Thailand	The film is set after event in 2001 film The Legend of Suriyothai about King Naresuan who executes the plotters and declares Ayutthaya independent from the Toungoo Empire
Blood Letter	2011	c. 1442	Vietnam	About the retaliation of Tran Nguyen Vu (Nguyen Trai's grandchild) for his grandfather's death in 1442. The movie was based on Bui Anh Tan's bestselling novel of the same name.
The Rebel	2007	1920s	Vietnam	Set in 1920s Vietnam under colonial French rule.
Indochine (film)	1992	1940s–1954	Vietnam	French film set in the twilight of colonial French Indochina during the 1930s.
The Scent of Green Papaya	1993	1950s	Vietnam	Set in 1950s Saigon.
The Quiet American	2002	1952	Vietnam	Set in Vietnam in 1952, and pertaining to emerging violent factions in the area and early CIA involvement.
The White Silk Dress	2006	1968	Vietnam	Directed by Luu Huynh. It is about a tragedy in Vietnam War.

=== Maritime Southeast Asia ===
Sortable table
Title	Release date	Time period	Setting	Notes
Krakatoa, East of Java	1969	1883	Indonesia	American film nominated for Academy Award for Best Visual Effects, featured the 1883 eruption of the volcano on the island of Krakatoa.
Paradise Road	1997	1939–1945	Indonesia	About the event of World War II on the island of Sumatra.
The Merdeka Trilogy: Merah Putih, Darah Garuda, and Hati Merdeka	2009–11	1945–1949	Indonesia	About the struggles of the Indonesians throughout the Indonesian National Revolution.
The Year of Living Dangerously	1982	1965	Indonesia	Directed by Peter Weir, about the Transition to the New Order (Indonesia–Malaysia confrontation) or vivere pericolosamente.
Mat Kilau	2022	1890s	Malaysia	Fictionalized account of Mat Kilau within the historical setting of late 19th-century Pahang.
Leftenan Adnan	2000	1940s	Malaysia	About the experiences of Adnan bin Saidi as a soldier during World War II.
Snow in Midsummer	2023	1969	Malaysia	The film deals with the 13 May Incident.
1965 (film)	2015	1963–1966	Singapore	Singapore in Malaysia, 1964 race riots in Singapore (Indonesia–Malaysia confrontation) and National Day of 1965.
Balibo	2009	1975	Timor-Leste	Australian film about the deaths of the Balibo Five, set during the Indonesian invasion of East Timor.

== See also ==
- Lists of historical films
  - List of Vietnamese historical drama films
  - List of Russian historical films
- List of films based on actual events
- List of war films and TV specials
- List of World War II films
- East Asian period drama films
  - Jidaigeki
  - Samurai cinema
