= Myn Bala =

2011 film directed by Akan Satajew

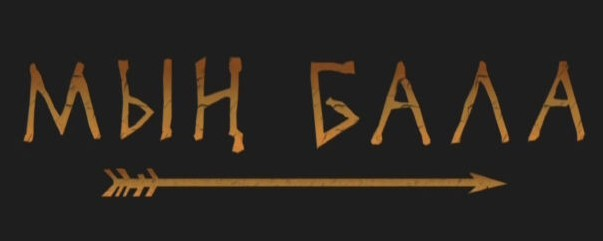
- Directed by: Akan Satayev
- Produced by: Anna Kachko; Aliya Uvalzhanova
- Music by: Renat Gaysin
- Production company: Kazakhfilm
- Release date: March 2011
- Running time: 100 minutes
- Country: Kazakhstan
- Language: Kazakh
- Budget: $7,000,000 (USD)

Myn Bala (Kazakh: Жаужүрек мың бала, Jaujürek myñ bala) is a 2011 Kazakh historical dramatic film depicting the eighteenth century war fought between the Kazakhs and the Dzungar Khanate, culminating in the Battle of Añyraqai. The film was made to commemorate the 20th anniversary of Kazakhstan's independence from the Soviet Union. Its production cost over $7 million (USD).

The film was selected as the Kazakhstani entry for the Best Foreign Language Film at the 85th Academy Awards, but it did not make the final shortlist.

== Plot ==
The film is set in the early eighteenth century during the Kazakh-Dzungar Wars. It follows Sartai, a young Kazakh warrior who gathers a group of young fighters to resist the Dzungar invasion. Alongside his companions Taimas and Korlan, Sartai takes part in the struggle to defend his homeland. The story culminates in the Battle of Añyraqai.

== Filming ==
Filming took place in several locations in Kazakhstan, including the Turgen Gorge, Kapal-Arasan and the steppe near the Kapchagay Reservoir. The production also used the landscapes of the Tian Shan mountains. More than 22,000 candidates reportedly auditioned for roles in the film.

== Cast ==
- Asylkhan Tolepov - Sartai Batyr
- Ayan Otepbergen - Taimas
- Kuralai Anarbekova - Korlan
- Tilekts Meyramov - Nazar
- Toleubek Aralbay - Rakhimzhan
- Aliya Anuarbek - Zere
- Nurlan Alimzhanov - Kasym
- Berik Aitzhanov - Abulkhair Khan

== See also ==
- List of Asian historical drama films
- List of submissions to the 85th Academy Awards for Best Foreign Language Film
- List of Kazakhstani submissions for the Academy Award for Best Foreign Language Film
