= Jungar =

Jungar may refer to:

- Dzungar people, sometimes spelled "Jungar" or "Jüün Ghar", the collective identity of several Oirat tribes
- Jungar, Nepal, Village Development Committee in Nepal
- Jungar Banner, county of Inner Mongolia, China

== See also ==
- Dzungar (disambiguation)
