= Dokuro =

Dokuro may refer to:

- Dokuro (film), a 1927 silent film
- Dokuro (video game), a 2012 video game
