= Yasushi Sasaki =

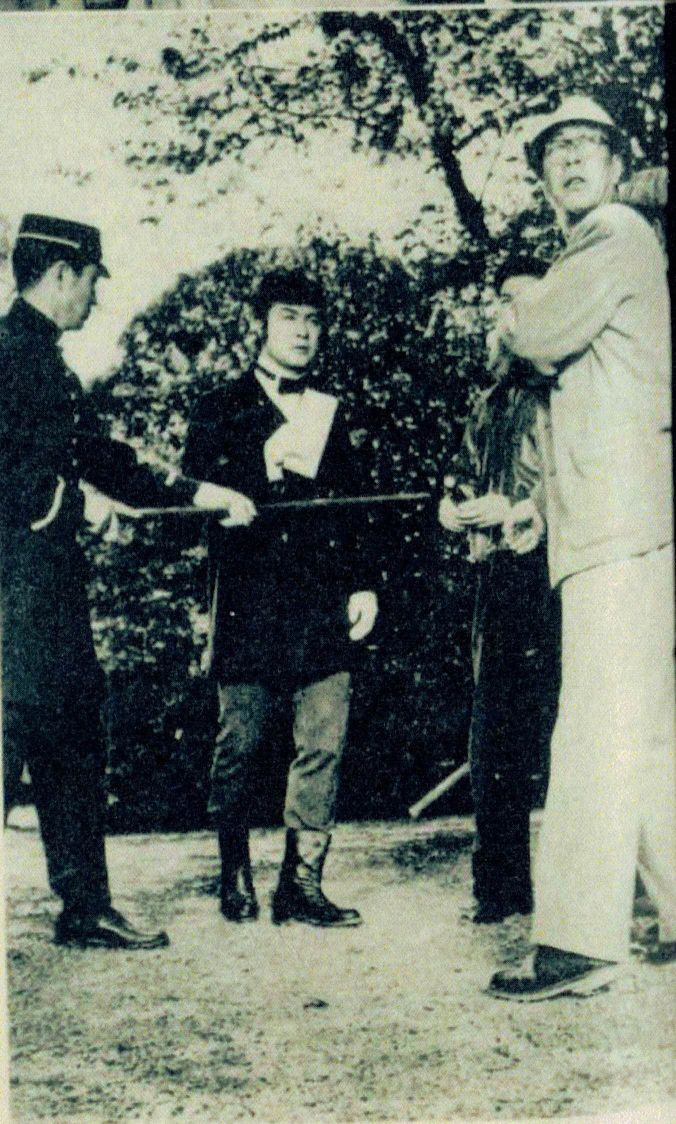
Sasaki (right) in 1957

Yasushi Sasaki (佐々木 康, 25 January 1908 – 13 September 1993), also known as Kō Sasaki, was a Japanese film director. He directed films from the 1920s to the 1960s.

== Filmography ==
=== Director ===
He directed 182 films; some of his famous works are as follows:

- Soyokaze (そよかぜ) (1945)
- Odoru ryū kyūjō (踊る龍宮城, literally "Dancing Dragon Palace") (1949)
- The Idle Vassal: House of the Snake Princess (旗本退屈男 謎の蛇姫屋敷 Hatamoto Taikutsuatoko: Nazo no Hebihime-Yoshiki) (1957)
- Shinsengum: Last Days of the Shogunate
