= Hemanta (film) =

2016 Indian Bengali film by Anjan Dutt

- Film poster
- Directed by: Anjan Dutt
- Based on: William Shakespeare's Hamlet
- Produced by: Shyam Sundar Dey, Pankaj Ludia
- Starring: Parambrata Chatterjee, Jisshu Sengupta, Payel Sarkar,
- Edited by: Arghyakamal Mitra
- Music by: Neel Dutt
- Production companies: GreenTouch Entertainment, Lundia Group
- Release date: 12 August 2016
- Running time: 146 minutes
- Country: India
- Language: Bengali

Hemanta is a 2016 Indian Bengali-language drama thriller film directed by Anjan Dutt. It stars Parambrata Chatterjee in the role of the titular protagonist, with Jisshu Sengupta, Payel Sarkar, Gargi Roychowdhury, Saswata Chatterjee and Shantilal Mukherjee in other pivotal roles. The film is a modern-day adaptation of William Shakespeare's tragedy Hamlet, from a West Bengal production house.

== Synopsis ==
Set amidst the backdrop of the entertainment world of Bengali cinema production, the film is about Hemanta Sen who goes off to the United States at a young age to study film. Trained as a filmmaker, he comes back to learn that his father had died three years ago and also about his mother's relationship with his uncle.

== Cast ==
Actor	Role	Based on
Parambrata Chatterjee	Hemanta Sen	Prince Hamlet
Payel Sarkar	Olipriya	Ophelia
Jisshu Sengupta	Hirak	Horatio (Hamlet)
Gargi Roychowdhury	Gayatri Sen	Gertrude
Saswata Chatterjee	Kalyan Sen	Claudius
Shantilal Mukherjee		
Souptik Chakraborty		Polonius
Subhra Sourav Das	Yuri	
Sagnik Chatterjee	Raju	Rosencrantz
Vivaan Ghosh		Guildenstern

== Critical reception ==
Shamayita Chakraborty of The Times of India gave 3 stars and praised the performances of Parambrata Chatterjee, Jisshu Sengupta, Saswata Chatterjee and Sagnik Chatterjee while criticized the absence of the Ghost (Hamlet) in the story.
