= Subhra Sourav Das =

Indian actor

- Born: 1 June 1988 (age 38); Kolkata, India
- Education: Vidyasagar College
- Occupation: Actor
- Years active: 2013 – present

Subhra Sourav Das (born June 1, 1988) is an Indian television and film actor based in Kolkata. He also worked with Kaushik Sen's theatre group, Swapnasandhani.

== Early life and career ==
Das wanted to be a professional footballer, but an accident took his dream off. He was instructed to take bed rest and never go back to the field again to play football. During that period, he watched many films and read several books. He became interested in acting. Later, he met Kaushik Sen and became a part of Swapnasandhani theater group. That was the start of his acting career. After that, he also acted in several movies. He frequently collaborated with director Anjan Dutt in his films like, Ganesh Talkies (his film debut), Byomkesh Phire Elo, Hemanta, Byomkesh o Chiriyakhana, and The Bongs Again. Apart from that, he acted in Srijit Mukherjee's Zulfiqar. He also acted in several T.V. series.

== Filmography ==
=== Films ===
Year	Film	Role	Director	Note
2013	Ganesh Talkies	Anthony	Anjan Dutt	
2014	Byomkesh Phire Elo	Mokorondo	Anjan Dutt	
2016	Hemanta	Yuri	Anjan Dutt	
2016	Zulfiqar	Saqlain Maqsood	Srijit Mukherji	His role is based on Sextus Pompey.
2016	Byomkesh o Chiriyakhana	Panugopal	Anjan Dutt	
2017	The Bongs Again	Hori	Anjan Dutt	
2020	Dwitiyo Purush	Jimmy/Gora	Srijit Mukherji	
2020	Rawkto Rawhoshyo	Middle-man	Soukarya Ghosal	
2023	JK 1971	Jean Eugene Paul Kay	Fakhrul Arefeen Khan	

=== Television ===
Year	Film	Role	Network	Note
2015	Tomay Amay Mile	Kunjo Behari	Star Jalsha	
2015-2016	Kiranmala	Donkar	Star Jalsha	
2016-2017	Bhakter Bhogobaan Shri Krishna	Shishupala	Star Jalsha	
2017	Aamar Durga	John Davis	Zee Bangla	
2019	Debi Choudhurani	East India Company officer	Star Jalsha	
2019	Karunamoyee Rani Rashmoni	Anmary Saheb: English Man	Zee Bangla	
2025	Raj Rajeshwari Rani Bhabani	Saheb	Star Jalsha	

=== Theatre ===
- Macbeth as Malcolm
- Antigone as Haemon
