= Xuejiawan, Jungar Banner =

Xuejiawan 薛家湾 ᠰᠢᠦᠸᠡᠢ ᠵᠢᠶᠠ ᠸᠠᠨ
- Town
- Location in China
- Coordinates: 39°51′36″N 111°14′24″E
- Country: China
- Province: Inner Mongolia
- Prefecture: Ordos
- Banner: Jungar

Area
  - Total: 1,345.097 km^{2} (519.345 sq mi)

Population
  - Total: 165,000
  - Density: 123/km^{2} (318/sq mi)
- Time zone: UTC+8 (China Standard)
- Postal code: 017100
- Area code: 0477

Xuejiawan (Chinese: 薛家湾; pinyin: Xuējiāwān) Šiovaj ž’e van (Mongolian: ᠰᠢᠦᠸᠡᠢ
ᠵᠢᠶᠠ
ᠸᠠᠨ ; Шиовай жье ван) is a town and the Banner seat of Jungar Banner, Ordos City, in the Inner Mongolia Autonomous Region, People's Republic of China. It has an area of 1345.097 square kilometers and a population of 165,000.
