= Dzungar =

Dzungar may refer to:

- Dzungar people, Oirat tribes in the Dzungar Khanate
- Dzungar Khanate, a historical empire
- Jungar Banner, an administrative division of China
- Junggar Basin, a geographical region in northwest China

== See also ==
- Jungar (disambiguation)
