= The Idle Vassal: House of the Snake Princess =

- Directed by: Yasushi Sasaki
- Written by: Hyogo Suzuki; Yasushi Sasaki
- Based on: Hatamoto Taikutsu Otoko by Mitsuzo Sasaki
- Produced by: Tatsuo Sakamaki
- Starring: Utaemon Ichikawa
- Cinematography: Takeo Itō
- Edited by: Takatoshi Suzuki
- Music by: Eiichi Yamada
- Production company: Toei
- Release date: May 22, 1957
- Running time: 94 minutes
- Country: Japan
- Language: Japanese

The Idle Vassal: House of the Snake Princess (旗本退屈男 謎の蛇姫屋敷, Hatamoto Taikutsuotoko: Nazo no Hebihime-Yashiki) is a 1957 color Japanese film directed by Yasushi Sasaki.

It is the 22nd film in the Hatamoto Taikutsuotoko (旗本退屈男) series.

== Cast ==
- Saotome Mondosuke: Utaemon Ichikawa
- Kirishima Kyōya: Kin'ya Kitaōji
- Saotome Kikuji: Akiko Santo
- Sasao Kinai: Shunji Sakai
