= Dokuro (film) =

1927 film

- Directed by: Sentaro Shirai
- Produced by: Ichikawa Utaemon Film Production
- Starring: Utaemon Ichikawa; Kokuten Takado; Daikichi Arashi; Taki Akizuki
- Narrated by: Midori Sawato
- Cinematography: Koh Matsui
- Distributed by: Digital Meme
- Release date: 1927 (Japan)
- Running time: 32 minutes
- Country: Japan
- Language: Silent (with Japanese intertitles)

Dokuro (恐苦呂) is a 1927 black and white Japanese silent film with benshi accompaniment directed by Sentaro Shirai. This is a significant and rare film in that it depicts the tragic fate of a Christian lord who fought for his faith in the Edo period. Especially noteworthy are the final scenes in which Utaemon Ichikawa takes on his enemy with a gash in his forehead and wild, unkempt hair.
