= Bear falls (Turgen gorge) =

Bear (Medvezhyi)
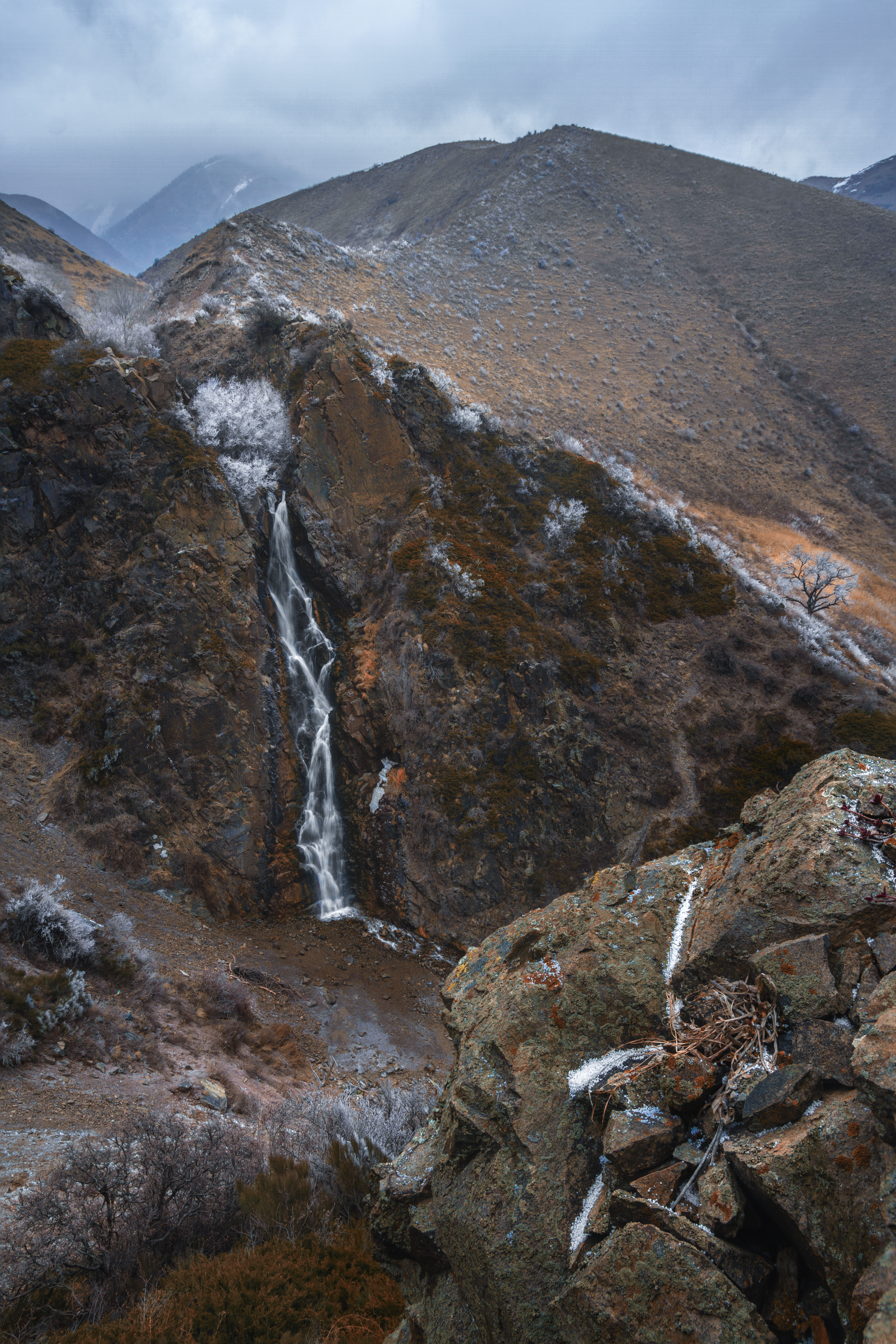
- Interactive map of Bear (Medvezhyi)
- Location: Kazakhstan, Almaty Region
- Coordinates: 43.281437°N 77.715389°E
- Total height: 28 m (92 ft)
- Watercourse: 0.4 cubic meters

Bear falls (Kazakh: Аюлы сарқырамасы, romanized: Aiuly sarqyramasy, Russian: Медвежий водопад) is a waterfall found in the Almaty Region of Kazakhstan.

== Description ==
The falls is in a deep rock niche on the southern slope of the Karash range, where Bear Creek flows from under the Zhambas Pass. It has a glacial origin. According to geologists, about a million years ago significant tectonic movements formed the streambed. The falls is at 1521 meters elevation. Its height is 28 meters, with a water flow is 0.4 cubic meters per second. The falling water forms a cloud of water vapor. The temperature of the stream does not exceed 12 degrees. The rocks at the waterfall hold fossilised imprints of plants from the pre-glacial period.

== Legend ==
Local legend has it that, at one time, an elderly couple lived in these gorges, raised their children, and lived alone. Once, the head of the family, already an old man, went to the forest for firewood. He did not return, and his wife went in search of him. On the way, she met a young Dzhigit, whom she asked if he had seen her partner. In response, the young man asked with a laugh: "do You not recognize your spouse?". The startled old woman could not utter a word. He took her to the spring, where she sipped the water and turned into a beautiful young woman. Since then, people began to call the spring Molodilny and, going to the gorge, fill containers to take water home.

== Protected status ==
Bear Falls is in a specially protected natural area with the status of a nature conservation and scientific institution. Protection of the falls is assigned to the administration of the state natural park Ile-Alatau.
