= Utaemon Ichikawa =

Japanese actor (1907–1999)

Utaemon Ichikawa 市川右太衛門
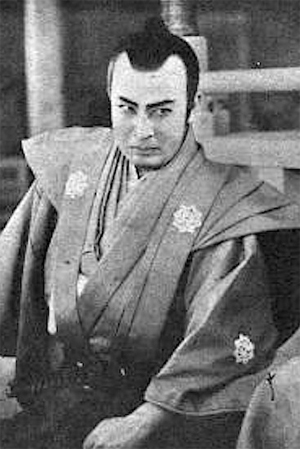
- Utaemon Ichikawa
- Born: February 25, 1907; Marugame, Kagawa, Japan
- Died: September 16, 1999 (aged 92)
- Occupation: Film actor

Utaemon Ichikawa (市川 右太衛門, Ichikawa Utaemon; 25 February 1907 – 16 September 1999) was a Japanese film actor famous for starring roles in jidaigeki from the 1920s to the 1960s. Trained in kabuki from childhood, he made his film debut in 1925 at Makino Film Productions under Shōzō Makino. Quickly gaining popularity, he followed the example of Makino stars such as Tsumasaburō Bandō in starting his own independent production company, Utaemon Ichikawa Productions, in 1927. It was there he first began the "Idle Vassal" (Hatamoto taikutsu otoko) series, which would become his signature role. When his company folded in 1936 as sound film came to the fore, he moved to Shinkō Kinema and then Daiei Studios before helping form the Toei Company after World War II. He served on the board of directors along with fellow samurai star Chiezō Kataoka. Utaemon appeared in over 300 films during his career. His son, Kin'ya Kitaōji, is also a famous actor in film and television.

== Selected filmography ==
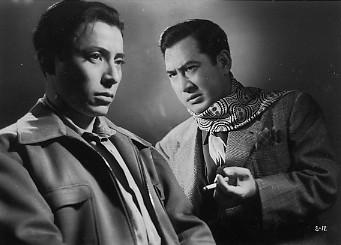
Kōkichi Takada (left) and Utaemon in 1950

- Dokuro (恐苦呂) (1927)
- Nishikie Edosugata Hatamoto to Machiyakko (錦絵江戸姿 旗本と街奴, The Color Print of Edo: Hatamoto to Machiyakko) (1939)
- The 47 Ronin (元禄忠臣蔵, Genroku chūshingura) (1941/1942)
- Kojiki Taishō (1952)
- Ninkyō Shimizu-minato (任侠清水港, Ninkyō Shimizu-minato) (1957)
- The Idle Vassal: House of the Snake Princess (旗本退屈男謎の蛇姫屋敷, Hatamoto taikutsu otoko: Nazo no Hebihime yashiki) (1957)
- Akō Rōshi (赤穂浪士, Akō Rōshi) (1961)

== Honours ==
- Medal with Purple Ribbon (1972)
- Order of the Rising Sun, 4th Class, Gold Rays with Rosette (1979)
