= JK 1971 =

- Theatrical release poster
- Directed by: Fakhrul Arefeen Khan
- Screenplay by: Masum Reza; Fakhrul Arefeen Khan
- Based on: PIA flight PK712 hijacking
- Produced by: Fakhrul Arefeen Khan; Israt Sultana; Tanvir Mishuk
- Starring: Subhra Sourav Das; Sabyasachi Chakrabarty; Daria Gavrushenko; Indrajit Majumdar; Avishek Singh
- Cinematography: Rana Dasgupta
- Edited by: Pranoy Dasgupta
- Music by: Debajyoti Mishra
- Production company: Gorai Films
- Distributed by: Gorai Films
- Release date: 3 March 2023 (Bangladesh)
- Running time: 82 mins
- Country: Bangladesh
- Languages: English; French; Urdu

JK 1971 or 1971 et Kay is a 2023 Bangladeshi period drama film directed by Fakhrul Arefeen Khan and produced by Gorai Films. It is the first English-language Bangladeshi film about the Bangladesh liberation war that features Sabyasachi Chakrabarty and Subhra Sourav Das in lead role. The film is based on the PIA flight PK712 hijacking.

== Premise ==
On 3 December 1971, Jean Eugene Paul Kay, a French citizen, hijacked a Boeing 720 owned by Pakistan International Airlines at Orly Airport. He demanded that the government of France sent 20 tons of relief and medicines to the camps of East Bengali refugees in India and people of East Pakistan in the support of the Bangladesh liberation war.

== Cast ==
- Subhra Sourav Das as Jean Eugene Paul Kay
- Sabyasachi Chakrabarty as pilot
- Daria Gavrushenko as Konal
- Indrajit Majumdar as interpreter
- Avishek Singh as first pilot
- Francisco Raymond
- Nikolai Novominaski

== Production ==
Fakhrul Arefeen Khan, director of the film, announced its production on 9 March 2021. His purpose to produce to the film was to honor the Mujib Year. It was also announced that Sabyasachi Chakrabarty would be in the film, it was his second film with Fakhrul. The director said that the production of JK 1971 would start from April 2021 in West Bengal. On 18 September 2021, its filming started with 36 actors. Its post-production ended on 23 April 2022.

== Release ==
Fakhrul wanted to release the film on 3 December 2021 after its production. It was screened in Mumbai International Film Festival and International Istanbul Film Festival in August 2022 and Kolkata International Film Festival in December 2022. On 10 January 2023, the film got green signal from the Bangladesh Film Censor Board to release in Bangladesh. It became the opening film of 2023 Dhaka International Film Festival. It was theatrically released in Bangladesh on 3 March 2023. It was released in the country on 7 cinemas.

== Controversy ==
After the film's release, Amit Mollick alleged that the basic storyline of the film was lifted from a film script he had emailed to the director in 2017. However, the director denied the allegation and said that he is ready to face the case if Amit files a case of plagiarism against him.

== Reception ==
Film critic Ahsan Kabir of the Bangla Tribune praised the performance of lead actors of the film.

=== Accolades ===
List of awards and nominations
Organization	Year	Category	Recipients & nominees	Result	Ref.(s)
Mumbai International Film Festival	2022	Best historical film	Fakhrul Arefeen Khan	Won	
International Istanbul Film Festival	2022	Best narrative feature film	Fakhrul Arefeen Khan	Won	
Kolkata International Film Festival	2022	Asian Select Neptac Awards	Fakhrul Arefeen Khan	Nominated	
Dhaka International Film Festival	2023	Special audiences award	Fakhrul Arefeen Khan	Won	
