= Nishikie Edosugata Hatamoto to Machiyakko =

- Directed by: Kazuo Mori
- Starring: Utaemon Ichikawa; Yaeko Kumoi; Shinpachiro Asaka; Wakako Kunitomo
- Narrated by: Shunsui Matsuda; Midori Sawato
- Cinematography: Tsunejiro Kawasaki
- Distributed by: Digital Meme
- Release date: 1939 (Japan)
- Running time: 65 minutes
- Country: Japan
- Language: Japanese

Nishikie Edosugata Hatamoto to Machiyakko (錦絵江戸姿 旗本と街奴, The Color Print of Edo: Hatamoto to Machiyakko) is a 1939 black and white Japanese silent film with benshi accompaniment directed by Kazuo Mori and starring Utaemon Ichikawa, who gained enormous popularity for his portrayal of a cheerful and chivalrous man.

== Plot ==
This cheerful period drama, sprinkled with comical scenes, tells the story of a loyal and handsome Edo period servant who fights to help his older brother marry the woman he loves.
