= Pakistan International Airlines Flight 712 =

1971 aircraft hijacking

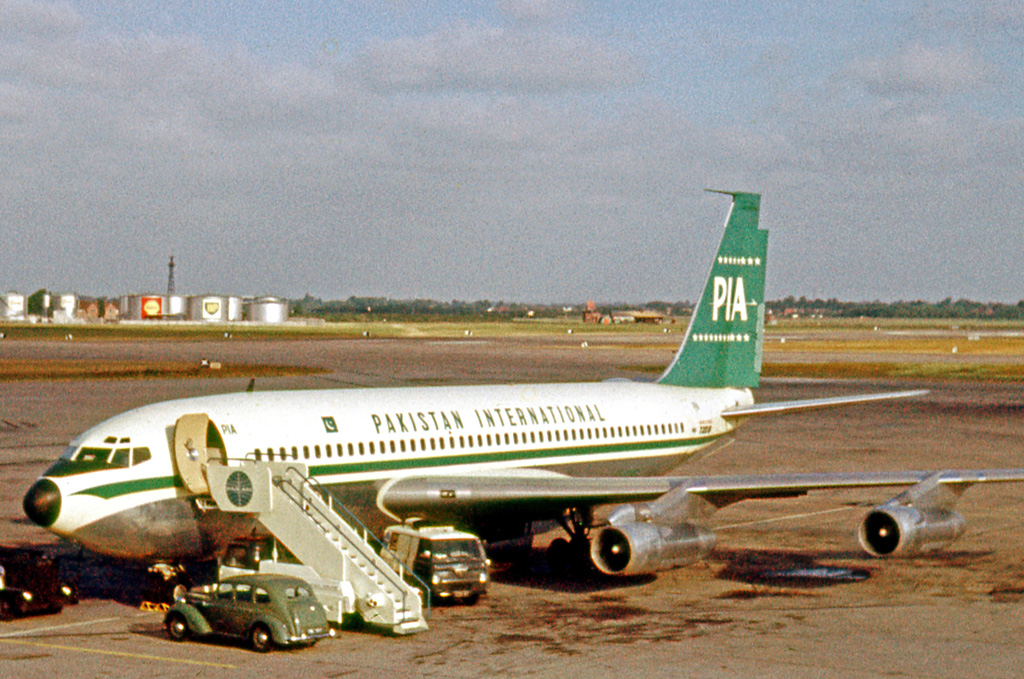
- AP-AMG, similar to the one involved in the incident

Hijacking
- Date: 3 December 1971
- Summary: Hijacking
- Site: Orly Airport, Paris, France

Aircraft
- Aircraft type: Boeing 720-040B
- Aircraft name: City Of Comilla
- Operator: Pakistan International Airlines
- IATA flight No.: PK712
- ICAO flight No.: PIA712
- Call sign: PAKISTAN 712
- Registration: AP-AMG
- Flight origin: London
- 1st stopover: Paris
- 2nd stopover: Rome
- 3rd stopover: Cairo
- Destination: Karachi
- Occupants: 28
- Fatalities: 0
- Injuries: 0
- Survivors: 28

On 3 December 1971, Jean Eugene Paul Kay, a 28 year old French humanitarian activist, hijacked Pakistan International Airlines Flight PK712 (a Boeing 720), at Orly Airport outside Paris, France.

The West German Chancellor Willy Brandt and French President Georges Pompidou met one-on-one in Paris that same day. All of the security personnel were focused on ensuring the safety of these VIPs, including the West German chancellor and his entourage, who had just arrived at the airport. During this heightened security Jean Kay and his fellow hijackers managed to board the aircraft.

The flight was bound from London to Karachi via Paris, Rome and Cairo. The pilots were about to take off for Rome when Kay gave them an order to turn off the engines at gunpoint. He yelled at the crew and pilots, threatening to blow up the aircraft if they disobeyed him.

Kay immediately grabbed the captain's wireless set and connected to the airport control tower. He demanded for 20 tons of medical supplies to be loaded onto the plane and sent to the refugees of Bangladesh Liberation War sheltered in India, and threatened to blow up the aircraft if the demands were not met. After a standoff of seven hours, Kay was arrested by two police personnel who boarded the aircraft in the disguise of volunteers delivering the supplies he demanded.

== In popular culture ==
1971 et Kay, a 2023 English-language Bangladeshi film, is based on this event.

== See also ==
- Bangladesh Liberation War
- 1971 Bangladesh genocide
