= Jungar Banner =

Jungar Banner 准格尔旗 • ᠵᠡᠭᠦᠨᠭᠠᠷ ᠬᠣᠰᠢᠭᠤ
- Banner
- Location in Inner Mongolia Jungar (China)
- Coordinates: 39°52′N 111°14′E
- Country: China
- Autonomous region: Inner Mongolia
- Prefecture-level city: Ordos
- Banner seat: Xuejiawan

Area
  - Total: 7,692 km^{2} (2,970 sq mi)
- Elevation: 1,173 m (3,848 ft)

Population (2020)
  - Total: 359,184
  - Density: 46.70/km^{2} (120.9/sq mi)
- Time zone: UTC+8 (China Standard)
- Postal code: 017100
- Area code: 0477
- Website: www.zge.gov.cn

Jungar Banner

Chinese name
- Simplified Chinese: 准格尔旗
- Traditional Chinese: 准格爾旗
Transcriptions
Standard Mandarin
- Hanyu Pinyin: Zhǔngé'ěr Qí

Mongolian name
- Mongolian Cyrillic: Зүүнгар хошуу
- Mongolian script: ᠵᠡᠭᠦᠨᠭᠠᠷ ᠬᠣᠰᠢᠭᠤ
Transcriptions
- SASM/GNC: Jegünɣar qosiɣu

Jungar Banner (Mongolian: ᠵᠡᠭᠦᠨᠭᠠᠷ ᠬᠣᠰᠢᠭᠤ; Chinese: 准格尔旗) is a banner of western Inner Mongolia, China, lying on the western (right) bank of the Yellow River and bordering the provinces of Shanxi to the southeast and Shaanxi to the southwest. It is under the administration of Ordos City.

== Administrative divisions ==
Jungar Banner is made up of 4 subdistrict, 7 towns, 2 townships, and 1 sum.

Name	Simplified Chinese	Hanyu Pinyin	Mongolian (Hudum Script)	Mongolian (Cyrillic)	Administrative division code
Subdistricts
Xinglong Subdistrict	兴隆街道	Xīnglóng Jiēdào	ᠰᠢᠩᠯᠦ᠋ᠩ ᠵᠡᠭᠡᠯᠢ ᠭᠤᠳᠤᠮᠵᠢ	Шинлэн зээл гудамж	150622001
Yingze Subdistrict	迎泽街道	Yíngzé Jiēdào	ᠶᠢᠩᠽᠧ ᠵᠡᠭᠡᠯᠢ ᠭᠤᠳᠤᠮᠵᠢ	Ензе зээл гудамж	150622002
Lantian Subdistrict	蓝天街道	Lántiān Jiēdào	ᠯᠠᠨᠲ᠋ᠢᠶᠠᠨ ᠵᠡᠭᠡᠯᠢ ᠭᠤᠳᠤᠮᠵᠢ	Ландиан зээл гудамж	150622003
Youyi Subdistrict	友谊街道	Yǒuyì Jiēdào	ᠶᠧᠦ ᠢ ᠵᠡᠭᠡᠯᠢ ᠭᠤᠳᠤᠮᠵᠢ	Ево И зээл гудамж	150622004
Towns
Xuejiawan Town	薛家湾镇	Xuējiāwān Zhèn	ᠰᠢᠦᠸᠡᠢ ᠵᠢᠶᠠ ᠸᠠᠨ ᠪᠠᠯᠭᠠᠰᠤ	Шиовай жье ван балгас	150622100
Xagdar Town	沙圪堵镇	Shāgēdǔ Zhèn	ᠱᠠᠭᠳᠠᠷ ᠪᠠᠯᠭᠠᠰᠤ	Шагтар балгас	150622101
Dalu Town	大路镇	Dàlù Zhèn	ᠳ᠋ᠠ ᠯᠤ ᠪᠠᠯᠭᠠᠰᠤ	Да лөө балгас	150622102
Nars Town	纳日松镇	Nàrìsōng Zhèn	ᠨᠠᠷᠠᠰᠤᠨ ᠪᠠᠯᠭᠠᠰᠤ	Нарсан балгас	150622103
Longkou Town	龙口镇	Lóngkǒu Zhèn	ᠯᠦᠩ ᠺᠧᠦ ᠪᠠᠯᠭᠠᠰᠤ	Лүн кев балгас	150622104
Jungar Ju Town	准格尔召镇	Zhǔngé'ěrzhào Zhèn	ᠵᠡᠭᠦᠨᠭᠠᠷᠵᠤᠤ ᠪᠠᠯᠭᠠᠰᠤ	Зүүнгарзуу балгас	150622105
Weijiamao Town	魏家峁镇	Wèijiāmǎo Zhèn	ᠸᠧᠢ ᠵᠢᠶᠠ ᠮᠣᠣ ᠪᠠᠯᠭᠠᠰᠤ	Вей жье муу балгас	150622106
Townships
Nuanshui Township	暖水乡	Nuǎnshuǐ Xiāng	ᠨᠤᠸᠠᠨ ᠱᠦᠢ ᠰᠢᠶᠠᠩ	Нюан шүй шиян	150622200
Shi'erliancheng Township	十二连城乡	Shí'èrliánchéng Xiāng	ᠱᠢ ᠡᠯ ᠯᠢᠶᠠᠨ ᠴᠧᠩ ᠰᠢᠶᠠᠩ	Ши эл лиан цэн шиян	150622201
Sum
Bor Tohoi Sum	布尔陶亥苏木	Bù'ěrtáohài Sūmù	ᠪᠣᠷᠣᠲᠣᠬᠣᠢ ᠰᠤᠮᠤ	Бордахуй сум	150622202

Other: Jungar Economic Development Zone (准格尔经济开发区)

== Climate ==
Climate data for Jungar Banner, elevation 1,221 m (4,006 ft), (1991–2020 normals, extremes 1981–2010)
Month	Jan	Feb	Mar	Apr	May	Jun	Jul	Aug	Sep	Oct	Nov	Dec	Year
Record high °C (°F)	7.8 (46.0)	17.6 (63.7)	27.0 (80.6)	35.5 (95.9)	36.2 (97.2)	36.1 (97.0)	38.6 (101.5)	36.1 (97.0)	35.0 (95.0)	28.1 (82.6)	21.2 (70.2)	11.5 (52.7)	38.6 (101.5)
Mean daily maximum °C (°F)	−3.4 (25.9)	1.4 (34.5)	9.1 (48.4)	17.2 (63.0)	23.2 (73.8)	27.4 (81.3)	29.0 (84.2)	26.7 (80.1)	21.4 (70.5)	14.9 (58.8)	5.7 (42.3)	−2.5 (27.5)	14.2 (57.5)
Daily mean °C (°F)	−9.8 (14.4)	−5.4 (22.3)	2.3 (36.1)	10.4 (50.7)	16.6 (61.9)	21.1 (70.0)	23.0 (73.4)	20.9 (69.6)	15.4 (59.7)	8.5 (47.3)	−0.1 (31.8)	−8.1 (17.4)	7.9 (46.2)
Mean daily minimum °C (°F)	−14.7 (5.5)	−10.6 (12.9)	−3.5 (25.7)	3.8 (38.8)	9.9 (49.8)	15.1 (59.2)	17.7 (63.9)	15.9 (60.6)	10.4 (50.7)	3.5 (38.3)	−4.6 (23.7)	−12.5 (9.5)	2.5 (36.6)
Record low °C (°F)	−29.2 (−20.6)	−27.9 (−18.2)	−19.6 (−3.3)	−8.7 (16.3)	−2.2 (28.0)	3.8 (38.8)	10.3 (50.5)	8.4 (47.1)	−1.3 (29.7)	−8.9 (16.0)	−20.4 (−4.7)	−30.4 (−22.7)	−30.4 (−22.7)
Average precipitation mm (inches)	2.2 (0.09)	5.3 (0.21)	7.5 (0.30)	21.5 (0.85)	36.8 (1.45)	51.7 (2.04)	98.5 (3.88)	89.8 (3.54)	63.0 (2.48)	27.8 (1.09)	12.7 (0.50)	1.8 (0.07)	418.6 (16.5)
Average precipitation days (≥ 0.1 mm)	2.5	2.9	3.1	4.4	6.7	10.1	12.5	11.0	9.6	5.7	3.0	1.9	73.4
Average snowy days	3.6	3.4	2.5	1.1	0.1	0	0	0	0	0.5	2.1	3.3	16.6
Average relative humidity (%)	52	48	38	34	35	45	57	62	61	56	54	52	50
Mean monthly sunshine hours	207.7	208.2	265.2	281.5	299.6	274.4	265.7	253.6	228.1	232.5	196.2	190.5	2,903.2
Percentage possible sunshine	69	68	71	70	67	61	59	60	62	68	66	66	66
Source: China Meteorological Administration
