= Kogda tvoya devushka bolna =

Song by Kino

from the album Black Album
- Language: Russian
- English title: When Your Girlfriend is Sick
- Released: 1990
- Recorded: 1990
- Genre: Indie pop; jangle pop; pop; folk-pop; alternative rock
- Length: 4:21
- Label: Metadigital
- Songwriters: Viktor Tsoi, Yuri Kasparyan

Music video
- "Когда твоя девушка больна" on YouTube

"Kogda tvoya devushka bolna" (Russian: «Когда твоя девушка больна», lit. 'When Your Girlfriend is Sick') is a song by the Soviet rock band Kino, included on their eighth and final posthumous studio album commonly known as the Black Album, released after the death of its author, Viktor Tsoi. The song was actively performed by the band's musicians at apartment concerts since 1988. Tsoi had plans to create a boy band that would perform "pop" songs, including "Kogda tvoya devushka bolna". Due to its poppier tone and songwriting, the song was not placed on records at the time of its initial performances. Despite the song also not fitting into the atmosphere of the "Black Album", Kino believed that the public should hear it.

Experts, such as Tsoi's biographer Vitaly Kalgin, have drawn similarities between "Kogda tvoya devushka bolna" and the Smiths' single "Girlfriend in a Coma", released 3 years prior.

== Background ==
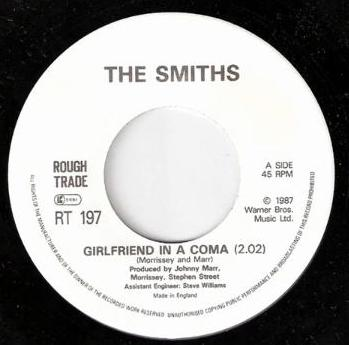
Disc with the Smiths single "Girlfriend in a Coma".

There are many different interpretations of who the song is dedicated to. According to one of them, the composition is dedicated to Marianna Tsoi, the wife of Viktor Tsoi. However, at the time the composition was written, the two were no longer living together. Another possibility was that Viktor Tsoi wrote the song to cheer up bandmate Yuri Kasparyan, whose girlfriend Marina Smirnova, who starred with Tsoi in the leading role of the film The Needle, was ill: (Note: Russian: "Я часто болела, а Юрий бегал вокруг меня с лекарствами. Витя не мог его никуда вытащить из-за меня. Тогда и родилась песня «Когда твоя девушка больна», которая стала хитом того времени. Эта песня и роль в фильме «Игла» — единственное, что мне осталось от Вити.")

I was often sick, and Yuri ran around with medicines. Vitya couldn't drag him anywhere because of me. That's when the song "Kogda tvoya devushka bolna" was born, which became a hit at that time. This song and the role in the film Needle are the only things I have left from Vitya.

— Marina Smirnova

Kasparyan himself agrees with this version, which would soon became an interpretation that most fans of Kino later adhere to.

== Musical style ==
The lyrics are relatively simple compared to songs Tsoi wrote for Kino – the lyrical protagonist is sad because his girlfriend is sick, and the whole world seems "not the same" without her, and nothing is a joy. Russian music critic Vitaly Kalgin called the lyrics ironic. Viktor Tsoi stated about the song: (Note: Russian: "Да я занимаюсь поп-музыкой. Музыка должна охватывать все: она должна когда надо, смешить, когда надо, веселить, а когда надо, и заставлять думать. …"Когда твоя девушка больна" — в ней есть шутка и самые простые рифмы, типа «кино — вино» — и больше ничего.")

Yes, I do pop music. Music should cover everything: it should make you laugh when it needs to, amuse you when it needs to, and make you think when it needs to. […] "When your girlfriend is sick" – it has a joke and the simplest rhymes, like "cinema – wine" – and nothing more.

— Viktor Tsoi

The song was the subject of much controversy for the band due to its noticeable pop sound. Some blamed the change of producer for this, however, Yuri Aizenshpis himself and the band members denied this. Viktor Tsoi researcher Vitaly Kalgin disagrees with this opinion, believing that Kino's work included elements of pop music from the very beginning. Moreover, Kalgin believed that the album Eto ne lyubov... contained songs that were poppier than "Kogda tvoya devushka bolna".

== Personnel ==
- Viktor Tsoi - vocals, acoustic guitar
- Yuri Kasparyan - acoustic guitar, keyboards
- Igor Tikhomirov - bass guitar
- Georgy Guryanov - Yamaha RX-5 programming

== Cover versions ==
In 2000, singer Yulia Chicherina recorded a cover version of the song for the tribute album "KINOproby".
