= Pachka sigaret =

Song by Kino

from the album Zvezda po imeni Solntse
- Language: Russian
- English title: Pack of cigarettes
- Released: 1989
- Recorded: 1988
- Genre: Rock; space rock
- Songwriter: Viktor Tsoi
- Composers: Viktor Tsoi; Yuri Kasparyan; Georgy Guryanov; Igor Tikhomirov

Music video
- "Пачка сигарет" on YouTube

"Pachka sigaret" (Russian: «Пачка сигарет», lit. 'Pack of cigarettes') is a song by the Soviet post-punk band Kino from the album Zvezda po imeni Solntse released in 1988. One of Kino's most popular songs, it was written in 1988, when Viktor Tsoi was being filmed for The Needle.

It was originally planned that the new album would be called Pachka sigaret because of this song, but the renaming happened after Tsoi decided to introduce the song "Zvezda po imeni Solntse" on the last day of recording.

In the 21st century, a number of musicians and bands such as Sergey Shnurov and Vopli Vidopliassova offered the audience their cover versions of this song.

== Background ==
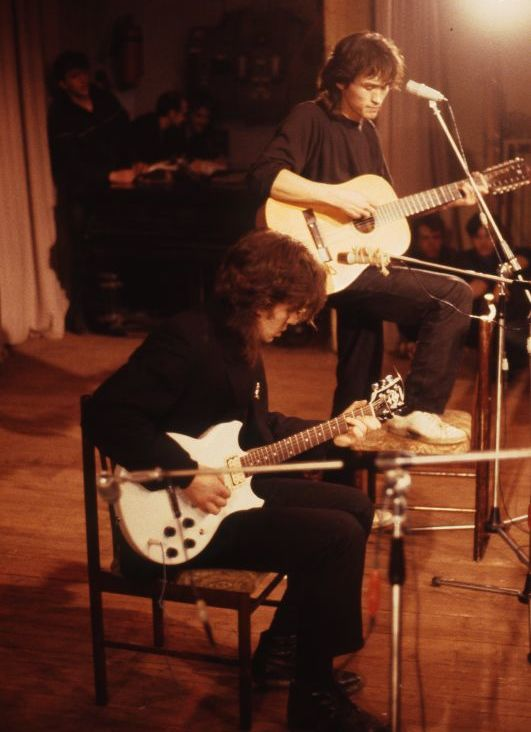
Yuri Kasparyan and Victor Tsoi on the concert in Saint Petersburg in 1986.

According to director Sergei Lysenko the idea for the song "Pachka sigaret" came from Viktor Tsoi in 1986 when the members of Kino were filming in the short film Konets Kanikul. This film did not become a significant event either in Soviet cinema or in Tsoi's creative biography, however, the atmosphere that developed in the film band was close to the mood of the future song. As Lysenko and Kyiv actor Aleksey Kovzhun recalled, one night after sitting up talking the musicians found that they had run out of cigarettes. Since shops with a round-the-clock work schedule did not exist in the USSR, several people, including Tsoi, went out into the street to "beg passers-by for cigarettes" in a conditional competition — "who gets the most" — the leader of the Kino group won.

The song itself was written two years later in Alma-Ata, where Tsoi starred in another film - The Needle by Rashid Nugmanov. Judging by the surviving draft, the original version of the text was somewhat different from the final version recorded in the album Zvezda po imeni Solntse. In the author's notepad manuscript, the first line was shorter: "I [sit and] look at someone else's sky from someone else's window." (Note: Russian: Я [сижу и] смотрю в чужое небо из чужого окна.) In addition, some auxiliary words were missing which later determined the rhythm of the composition. As Yuri Kasparyan, who arranged the song, said, his melody "was built purely mathematically" and therefore he selected the notes, guided by his own idea of their appropriateness: "I just like harmony, algebra - it's all very interesting."

The fact that the theme laid down in the song was close to Tsoi and his friends was also recalled by the first director of Kino Yuri Belishkin - according to the producer he first came to meet the musicians (who in the late 1980s worked, as a rule in the Leningrad apartment of the band's drummer Georgy Guryanov on Budapeshtskaya Street) he drew attention to the unpretentiousness of the situation: “A table, cigarettes and tea. They sat, were silent, smoked, played something on the guitars". It was in Guryanov's apartment that the experimental versions of the compositions included in the new rock cycle were recorded, which for a long time had the working title Pachka sigaret. The renaming took place at the end of 1988 at the initiative of Tsoi, who announced that he had decided to add the song "Zvezda po imeni Solntse" already recorded for the film Needle and it would give the name to the album.

== Composition ==
"Pachka sigaret" excerpt

The main features of the lyrical hero Tsoi were determined long before the release of the song. In 1985, the magazine Roxy, created on the basis of the Leningrad Rock Club, wrote that listeners know "almost everything" about the life of Tsoi's character: "He constantly smokes both cigarettes. He likes to walk at night, yearns for the Black Sea, does not really trust the train. As the hero grows older, he gains new life experience, and if in the album Gruppa krovi he realizes himself as a fighter in some existential war". By the next rock cycle Zvezda po imeni Solntse the character already feels tired from the confrontation with the world: "I walked all the roads and back and forth, / Turned around and could not see the traces". (Note: Russian: Я ходил по всем дорогам и туда и сюда / Обернулся и не смог разглядеть следы)

Pessimism, confusion, the feeling that there is no way back, occupy the thoughts of the poet. Having traveled a long way of becoming the hero looks back but does not look for a way back does not seek to return to the previous perception of reality. He traveled many roads to find his way.

— I. Ivanov, E. Shadjanova

== Personnel ==
- Viktor Tsoi — lead vocal, rhythm guitar
- Yuri Kasparyan — lead guitar, keyboard, backing vocal
- Igor Tikhomirov — bass guitar, backing vocal
- Georgy Guryanov — drum machine Yamaha RX-5, backing vocal

== Bibliography ==
- Житинский, А. Н.; Цой, М., eds. (1991). Виктор Цой. Стихи, документы, воспоминания. Звезды рок-н-ролла. Новый Геликон. ISBN 5-85-395-018-5.
- Доманский, Юрий Викторович (2010). Русская рок-поэзия: текст и контекст. Интрада-издательство Кулагиной. p. 230. ISBN 978-5-87604-224-8.
- Калгин, Виталий Николаевич (2015). Виктор Цой / Виталий Калгин. Жизнь замечательных людей: Малая серия: сер. биогр.; вып. 77. Молодая гвардия. ISBN 978-5-235-03751-9.
- Калгин, Виталий Николаевич (2015). Виктор Цой и его "Кино". Легенды русского рока. АСТ. ISBN 978-5-17-091690-0.
- Калгин, Виталий Николаевич (2016). Цой. Последний герой современного мифа. Несерийное издание. Рипол-классик. ISBN 978-5-386-05812-8.
- Иванов, И. Д.; Шаджанова, Е. И. (2017). "Концепт "Герой" в структуре вербального компонента синтетической языковой личности В. Цоя". Филологические науки. Вопросы теории и практики (3—2 (69)): 96–99.
- Рыбин, А.; Цой, М., eds. (2001). Виктор Цой. Кино. ЛЕАН.
