= Jesse James in music =

Jesse James became a hero in folklore and dime novels before he was killed in 1882. A manifestation of this was the emergence of a wide body of music that celebrates or alludes to Jesse James.

== Folk song ==
The most famous song about Jesse James is the folk song "Jesse James" recorded in 1924 by Bascom Lamar Lunsford, and subsequently by many artists, including Woody Guthrie, Pete Seeger, The Pogues, Bob Seger, The Country Gentlemen, Burl Ives, Willy DeVille, Van Morrison and Bruce Springsteen on his 2006 album We Shall Overcome: The Seeger Sessions.

== Other appearances ==
- Prefab Sprout's 1990 album, Jordan: The Comeback featured a song called "Jesse James Symphony", which segued into another named "Jesse James Bolero". (These songs are bracketed by a corresponding pair about Elvis Presley, to whom Jesse is implicitly compared.)
- Warren Zevon, wrote and recorded a song called "Frank and Jesse James".
- Rap singer Scarface released a song titled "Jesse James" on his seminal 1994 album The Diary
- Irish folk-punk band The Pogues have a shortened version, missing out the middle two verses, on their album Rum, Sodomy and the Lash.
- Clubland recorded a ska tune entitled "Jesse James", in which Jesse is referred to as "the rudest rude boy..."
- Terry Allen's song "New Delhi Freight Train" begins "Some people think that I must be crazy / But my real name is just Jesse James", and is narrated by the outlaw. Originally recorded on Allen's 1979 album Lubbock (On Everything), the song has been covered by Ricky Nelson, and by Little Feat.
- In the 1970s Mary McCaslin, noted American folk singer, recorded "The Band of Jesse James," written by her performing partner and husband Jim Ringer. "He's wild as a half grown child at a grown-up party Like a mustang dang near kicking down the stall He's the kind to pay no mind to what he started He don't care, `cause he'll be somewhere else by fall A wanted man in Reno, he moves on to Coeur d'Alene You know that man could've rode with the band of Jesse James."
- An outtake recorded by the Bruce Springsteen Band in 1972 called "Don't You Want to be an Outlaw" focuses on the mythical aspects of the American West, with a line in its chorus "Don't you want to be an outlaw / Just like Jesse James."
- In 2012 Clay Walker released "Jesse James" as the fourth single from his 2010 studio album She Won't Be Lonely Long.
- In 2014 North Country Gentlemen released The Ballad of Jesse James as a single.
- In 2016 Brazilian/American singer-songwriter Paula Marchesini released the song "Jesse James Blood" on YouTube, credited to herself and a mysterious JJ.

=== Memorial songs ===
- The Legend of Jesse James is a concept album documenting his life. It features Levon Helm, Johnny Cash, Charlie Daniels and Emmylou Harris, and Albert Lee among others. Written by Paul Kennerley, it was originally released in 1980. Two songs on this album, "High Walls" and "One More Shot" have been covered by the roots band, Marley's Ghost.
- The Irish folk singer Christy Moore wrote a song called "Jesus Christ and Jesse James" about the two of them visiting Belfast, Northern Ireland, together during the Troubles.
- The late Timmy Brown wrote a song called "Fighting Man" about Jesse James.
- The Cannonballs produced a song about the history of Jesse James called "Outlaw Jesse James"
- Kate Bush wrote a track titled "James and the Cold Gun" about Jesse James, for her 1978 debut album The Kick Inside.
- Dezperadoz, with the song "Jumpin' Down The Running Train"
- Dan Fogelberg, the 1985 bluegrass/traditional acoustic music album "High Country Snows" features the song "The Outlaw" composed by Jay Bolotin.
- Rickey Gene Wright is an Americana Singer Songwriter who wrote the song "Frank And Jesse James" in 1982 while he was one of the weekly performers at the Mesquite Opry. This song tells of the effect the American Civil War had on the James Brothers and the reason why they became outlaws, "It was all the same to Frank and Jesse James".
- Los Bastardos Magnificos Wrote and Recorded a song entitled "Outlaw Song" which appears on a split CD and their live album.
- Terry Allen wrote and recorded the song "New Delhi Freight Train", made popular by Little Feat on their album "Time Loves a Hero", which describes some of the exploits of Jesse James.
- The song by Australian singer-songwriter Dave Graney, "Robert Ford On The Stage", from Graney's 1989 Album, "My Life On The Plains" (Dave Graney With The White Buffaloes). Graney's song, both lyrically and musically, is a potent evocation of Robert Ford's tortured psychological state after he killed the notorious Jesse James. The song weaves a haunting narrative, mixing references to the closing moments of an imaginary Australian Rules Football match, and the bizarre stage-show created by Robert and his older brother not long after the assassination, which toured the countryside, and in which they enacted for audiences how James was shot in the back by the man who once worshipped him as a hero.

=== Mentions in group names ===
- In the 1970s there was a musical group named The James Gang
  - From 1968 to 1971 rock guitarist Joe Walsh, who later joined the Eagles, played in the band whose hits included "Funk #49" and "Walk Away."

=== Mentions in lyrics ===
- Sleeze Beez song "Heroes Die Young" mentions Jesse James
- Warren Zevon on his self-titled second album has the song "Poor Poor Pitiful Me", which contains the lyric "I met a girl in West Hollywood, but I ain't namin' names/She really worked me over good/She was just like Jesse James". Linda Ronstadt's cover version of "Poor Poor Pitiful Me" for her following year's eighth solo album, Simple Dreams, had second verse female viewpoint lyrics about a man ("he" and "his") she encountered in Hollywood, CA.
- George Strait states "Sometimes I feel like Jesse James / Still trying to make a name" in the chorus of his 2008 hit "Troubadour (song)".
- Joe Scruggs mentions in his rendition of Aunt Lucy that she had a baby named Jesse James.
- Toby Keith states "Running wild through the hills chasing Jesse James/Ending up on the brink of danger" in Should've Been A Cowboy.
- Swollen Members mentioned Mr. James in their song, "Sinister", when Mad Child says "Hang the hang man. Jesse James gang"
- Synthpop band The Magnetic Fields mentions Jesse in the first verse of "Two Characters in Search of a Country Song," from their 1994 album The Charm of the Highway Strip ("You were Jesse James, I was William Tell/ You were Daniel Webster, I was the Devil Himself").
- The Sugarhill Gang reference Jesse James in their song, "Apache" with the lyrics "My tribe went down in the Hall of Fame/'Cause I'm the one who shot Jesse James".
- A little known Jerry Reed song called "The Legend", found on the Smokey and the Bandit soundtrack, opens with the lyric "You heard about the Legend of Jesse James and John Henry just to mention some names/But there's a truck drivin' legend in the south today/a man called Bandit from Atlanta GA."
- Everlast, in their 1998 song "Ends," from the album Whitey Ford Sings the Blues, contains the lyrics "And all of a sudden he's like Jesse James, trying to stick up kids for their watches and chains."
- Mark Knopfler and Emmylou Harris, in the song "Belle Starr" from their 2006 album All the Roadrunning, have the line "I can be your Belle Starr and you can be my Jesse James" in the chorus.
- "A Train Robbery" by Paul Kennerley, (with the chorus, "We will burn this train to cinders, so throw that money on down,") appears on the 1999 re-release of The Legend of Jesse James. Levon Helm included a new version on his 2007 album Dirt Farmer.
- Bob Dylan, in his song "Outlaw Blues" from his 1965 album Bringing It All Back Home, defends his decision to "go electric" with the line "Ain't gonna hang no picture, ain't gonna hang no picture frame/Well, I might look like Robert Ford, but I feel just like a Jesse James."
- The Hal Bynum/Dave Kirby song (made popular by Cash and Waylon Jennings) "There Ain't No Good Chain Gang" declares "I ain't cut out to be no Jesse James."
- Gwar mentions Jesse James in their song "Bad Bad Men".
- The Lead Belly song, "Out on the Western Plains", contains the lyrics "When me and a bunch of cowboys run into Jesse James / The bullets was a-fallin' just like a shower rain". Rory Gallagher sings a version of the song on his 1975 album Against the Grain; it was also covered by Alvin Youngblood Hart on his 1996 debut album Big Mama's Door.
- The opening track on the album Home Sweet Home by South Memphis String Band (which features band members Alvin Youngblood Hart, Luther Dickinson and Jimbo Mathius) is entitled "Jesse James."
- Reggie and the Full Effect mention James in the song "G" on their album Last Stop: Crappy Town. During a verse in which the singer's psychologist raves about a daylight bank robbery, he responds by saying, "He doesn't even realize that Jesse James did that shit in motherfucking Liberty."
- Cher had a hit in 1989 with her song "Just Like Jesse James". "Tonight you're gonna go down in flames Just like Jesse James/I'm gonna shoot you down Jesse James"
- Nazareth, from the album Loud 'n' Proud in the song "Not Faking It" "Jesse James was a born killer/Me, I'm just a rock'n'roll singer"
- Laurel Aitken recorded "Jesse James" in 1969. "Jesse James rides again/Don't call me Billy the Kid, call me James, Jesse James"
- Hank Williams, Jr.'s 1983 album Strong Stuff has the song "Whole Lot of Hank," part of which indulges outlaw mythology with the lyrics, "Frank and Jesse James knowed how to rob them trains / They always took it from the rich and gave it to the poor, they might have had a bad name but they sure had a heart of gold." Also Hank's 1979 album Whiskey Bent and Hell Bound has the song "Old Nashville Cowboys" which features the words "Where are the cowboys and the home on the range / Does anyone know they've killed Jesse James".
- Johnny "Guitar" Watson wrote a song called "Gangster of Love". "Well, there's Frank James and Jesse James/Billy the Kid and all the rest"
- Brazzaville have a song on 2006 album East L.A. Breeze called "Jesse James". "When he was runnin’ from the cops/He said ... I don't wanna live your life/I wanna die like Jesse James"
- Snap! in its hit "The Power" sings "I'm the lyrical Jesse James". "Maniac brainiac winning the game/I’m the lyrical Jesse James"
- John Lee Hooker wrote a song titled "I'm Bad like Jesse James". "'Cause I'm mad, I'm bad, like Jesse James"
- Michael Martin Murphy recorded "Frank James' Farewell" with the lyric "Tonight I can hear Jesse calling, and tonight we will ride once again".
- Ry Cooder did a cover of the classic version of "Dirty Little Coward Who Shot Mr. Howard" using slide guitar on one of his early albums.
- Lil' Wayne in the song Right Above It ft Drake "And you niggas know I rep my game like Jesse James"
- Granger Smith mentions "Like and outlaw on the run, my guitar for a gun, if only he was here today, what would jesse james say"
- Jamie T's "Love Is Only A Heartbeat Away", in the album Carry on the Grudge, opens with the lyrics "So roll, roll down, rob a railroad train/Love like Robert Ford did Jessie James/Heart full of love but I'm only here to kill her".
- Killer Mike in the Run the Jewels' song "Call Ticketron" raps, "Hello everybody, this is now bank robbery/ Jesse James gang, we'll walk you through the process".
- Blind Lemon Jefferson mentions Jesse James in his 1927 song “One Dime Blues”; “You want your friend to be bad like Jesse James? Get two six shooters, highway some passenger train.”
- The Blue Stones mention James in the song "Jesse James" on their album Metro. "Load me up Jesse James, use that dead eye and aim for the head".

=== Robert Ford in music ===
Robert Newton "Bob" Ford, who gained fame by killing Jesse James in 1882, is also depicted in these songs.

- In the Bob Dylan song "Outlaw Blues", Dylan alludes to Ford with the lines, "I ain't gonna hang no picture/Ain't gonna hang no picture frame/Well I might look like a Robert Ford/But I feel just like a Jesse James."
- In 1975 Elton John had a minor hit with the song "I Feel Like a Bullet (In the Gun of Robert Ford)" refers to a betrayal in a romantic relationship that is metaphorically likened to Jesse James' assassin.
- In the Warren Zevon song "Frank and Jesse James," Ford is mentioned in the lyrics "Robert Ford, a gunman/In exchange for his parole/Took the life of James the outlaw/Which he snuck up on and stole."
- Motörhead, on their 1998 album Snake Bite Love, mention James and Robert Ford in the song "Desperate For You." ("I'm gonna be an outlaw, just like Jesse James; rob all of your banks, and the occasional train / And if Bobby Ford should shoot me, I know just what you'd do / That's why I'm a desperado, desperate for you.")
- Charley Crockett's song "I Shot Jesse James" describes the shooting of Jesse James and its consequences from the perspective of Ford.
