= 21st Century Girl =

21st Century Girl may refer to:

- 21st Century Girl (album), by Brazzaville, or the title song, 2008
- "21st Century Girl" (song), by Willow Smith, 2011
- "21st Century Girl", a song by Joey Ramone from the 2012 album ...Ya Know?
- 21st Century Girl, a 2019 anthology of short films produced by Yūki Yamato

== See also ==
- 21st Century Girls, a 1990s British band
- "21st Century Girls", a song by BTS from the 2016 album Wings
