= Camarillo State Mental Hospital =

Former hospital in California, United States

Camarillo State Hospital and Developmental Center
- State of California

Geography
- Location: Camarillo, California, United States
- Coordinates: 34°9′45″N 119°2′26″W

Organization
- Type: Specialist

Services
- Speciality: Psychiatric hospital, developmental disabilities

History
- Former names: Camarillo State Hospital, CAM
- Opened: 1936
- Closed: 1997

Links
- Lists: Hospitals in California

Camarillo State Mental Hospital, also known as Camarillo State Hospital, was a public psychiatric hospital for patients with both developmental disabilities and mental disorders in Camarillo, California. The hospital was in operation from 1936 to 1997.

The former hospital campus has been redeveloped and opened in 2002 as the California State University Channel Islands. The university has retained the distinctive Mission Revival architecture, and the bell tower in the South quad has been adopted as the symbol of the university.

== Pre-history ==
When the United States took possession of California and other Mexican lands in 1848, it was bound by the Treaty of Guadalupe Hidalgo to honor the legitimate land claims of Mexican citizens residing in those captured territories. The land upon which the former Camarillo State Hospital sat, once belonged to Isabel Yorba as part of an 1836 land grant, known as "Rancho Guadalasca."

In 1929, the California legislature initially appropriated $1,000,000 for the purchase of land and buildings to be utilized for a state hospital. Three years later, 1500 acres of the 8600 acre Lewis Ranch, owned by agriculturists Joseph P. Lewis and Adolfo Camarillo, located within the City of Camarillo, County of Ventura was acquired for $415,000.

== History ==
Architectural plans for the new hospital were rushed to state architect, George McDougall, to begin the process to accommodate the initial 3000 patients for the first unit. The hospital was expected to cover 200 acres with supply wards, homes for the superintendent and officials, dormitories for employees and patients, commissaries, and storerooms. It was anticipated that the completed hospital would house 7000 patients and over 700 staff.

The first artist rendition of the hospital appeared in The Camarillo News on November 25, 1932. Fifty male patients arrived in Camarillo in March 1933, and were initially housed in the farm home on the Lewis Ranch. That number grew to over 100, in June 1934. A call for construction bids came from the State in May 1933 and during that same month, Camarillo State Hospital or "CAM" as it was named affectionately by its employees, received its official name. Camarillo State Hospital officially joined six other state institutions, with 16,000 patients between them, under the direction of Dr. J.M. Toner.

Units 1 and 5 of the initial section of the hospital were scheduled for the first construction. The WPA project began. The groundbreaking ceremony took place on August 15, 1933, with Josephine Lewis, Mr. and Mrs. Adolfo Camarillo, Governor Rolph, and Dr. Toner in attendance. The new hospital project was a direct result of an agreement between the Public Works Administration and the State of California. The total amount of the construction cost was approximately $10,000,000 and at completion, was the largest mental hospital in the world.

In April 1936, Thomas W. Haggerty, physician, surgeon, and psychiatrist was hired as the new Superintendent for the hospital. However, the hospital didn't officially open for people with mental disabilities until October of that year. The official opening brought Governor Frank Merriam, who made the dedicatory address; Adolfo Camarillo; Joseph McGrath; Ed Rains; Roy Pinkerton; and other local celebrities.

The first official hospital patients were adult men, who were housed in the Bell Tower (South Complex). In 1937, 300 women patients were transferred to Camarillo from other state hospitals. In fact, there were so many patient transfers from other overcrowded state hospitals, that a North Complex was initiated in 1939. The South Complex and the North Complex were then divided into male and female wards.

In 1947, Camarillo State Hospital opened a ward for the admission of children with developmental disabilities. When this ward expanded, a Children's Treatment Center was constructed and occupied in January, 1955. The facility grew with a new Receiving and Treatment Center and an Administration Building in 1949. Staff population at this time was around 1518. In 1957, the patient population reached its peak, exceeding 7,000, the largest population that the hospital would see in its 60 years of existence.

Prior to 1959, adolescent males and females were housed with mentally disabled adults. In 1959, the adolescent females (including autistic patients) were separated from their adult counterparts. By 1968, the Adolescent Division was separated from the Children's Division and organized into four treatment units and a special school. In 1970, the units became co-educational.

The hospital began its double duty in 1967, when its role as a mental hospital for illnesses such as schizophrenia or manic depression, was widened to include a center for clients with developmental disabilities, such as organic brain disease, autism, and other birth defects that limit the ability to learn.

In 1969, the Lanterman Petris Short Act became effective, which eliminated the previous indefinite commitments of persons found by a court to be mentally disabled. The new law required an automatic judicial review of every decision to hospitalize a person involuntarily beyond a very limited time. The law also required annual reconsideration of involuntary treatment. State agencies encouraged outside placement of individuals under the Penal Code, which in turn, led levels of care or services at state hospitals to decrease, while costs of care increased.

In 1971, the Camarillo treatment staff was reorganized under a program management concept, which enabled the establishment of treatment programs for persons with similar needs. Each treatment program was headed by a program director/mental health professional. Later, in 1976, the reorganization of the hospital led to the establishment of an executive director, who appointed a Clinical Director, medical director, and Administration Services Director for the hospital. Discoveries regarding chemical barriers in the brain created a new generation of drugs, which enabled a mentally disabled person to live a normal life. After forty years, the "mental hospital" role of Camarillo dwindled.

In 1983, an innovative approach to treatment for the mentally disabled was initiated at CAM. Activity centers allowed adult patients to be placed in a day treatment location, away from the living units. Patients were allowed to leave their living units at various times of the day and evening to attend therapy groups, activity groups, and educational programs. These programs were refined to include the latest biopsychosocial treatment approaches developed by U.C.L.A. at the Camarillo State Hospital Research Center. The scheduling of patients into groups, based on their needs and strengths, allowed for the most individualized treatment available in the history of the facility.

In 1985, a new vision and role for the hospital was imagined: "Enhancing Independence Through Innovation". Camarillo evolved from a locked, lifetime institution for the severely mentally ill into a facility which provided innovative and successful treatment modalities for drug and alcohol abusers, as well as programs that stabilized the mentally and developmentally disabled and successfully returned them to society. For many years, the hospital remained independent and autonomous from the outside world, with its own gardens, ice house, dairy, butcher, fire and police departments, hospital, beauty parlors, petting zoo, clothing store, swimming pool, and bowling alley. It even housed staff on its grounds. With its accreditation ratings consistently high in the 1980s and 1990s, the hospital seemed destined to last forever.

== Closure ==
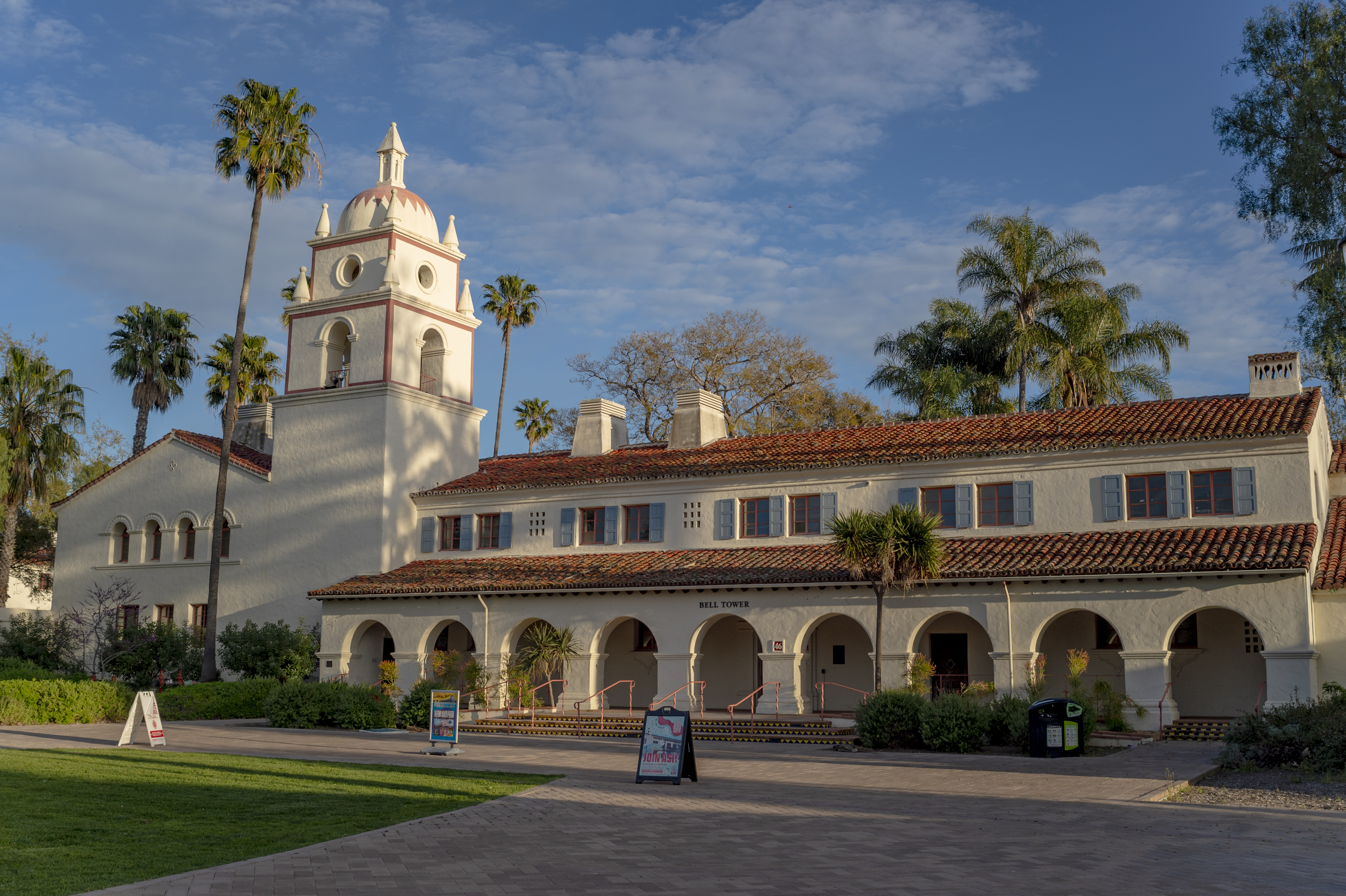
The Bell Tower Building (2024) of California State University Channel Islands, formerly Camarillo State Hospital

The end of the institution came due to economic challenges and a changing outlook on mental health treatment. In 1967, Governor Ronald Reagan signed the bi-partisan Lanterman-Petris-Short Act, which greatly affected state hospital populations, forcing many to close immediately.

Another contributing factor was in 1996, when Governor Pete Wilson empowered a special task force to research reasons for and against the closure of the Camarillo State Hospital and Developmental Center. The task force cited that the facility, which housed as many as 7,266 patients in 1954, had only 871 clients in 1996. The hospitals per capita costs had risen to nearly $114,000, second highest in the state mental health system. These factors prompted the initial closing of one-quarter of the facility's 64 units and later, on June 30, 1996, the hospital officially and permanently closed.

=== California State University Channel Islands ===
Originally the state intended to turn Camarillo into a prison, but community opposition in part and interest from the California State Universities led to its conversion into a university, California State University Channel Islands (CSUCI). The school had its first classes in Fall 2002. Some of the buildings of Camarillo have been preserved and revitalized, including many of the original 1930s mission-style buildings.

== In popular culture ==
- Jazz musician Charlie Parker's "Relaxin' at Camarillo", written while he was detoxifying after a heroin addiction, is a tribute to the facility.
- Exteriors for the 1948 film The Snake Pit, starring Olivia de Havilland, were filmed at Camarillo.
- The punk band FEAR has a song on their 1981 debut album The Record, called "Camarillo" which details incidents of electroshock therapy, unnecessary (brain) surgery, and random indiscriminate injections.
- The 1972 slasher movie Pigs, distributed by Troma Entertainment, had scenes shot here.
- In the 1975 film Farewell, My Lovely (set in 1941), Philip Marlowe (played by Robert Mitchum) is given the information that Velma Valento "went nuts" and is in Camarillo.
- The punk band The Screamers, led by front man and artist Tomata du Plenty, gave a gig at Camarillo State Mental Hospital, inside the premises, for the benefit of the patients, on 23 March 1978.
- The punk band Angry Samoans played a gig at Camarillo State Mental Hospital for the benefit of patients on 12 May 1979. Some patients participated in the performance.
- The opening scene from the Wes Anderson film Bottle Rocket was filmed at the Camarillo State Mental Hospital.
- 'N Sync's mental hospital-set video for "Thinking of You (I Drive Myself Crazy)" was filmed at Camarillo.
- During the dénouement of some television episodes of the Dragnet series, there were references to captured criminals being sentenced to Camarillo State Hospital.
- Scenes from The Ring and Buffy the Vampire Slayer were filmed at and around the hospital's grounds.
- Season 4 of the TV show The Biggest Loser was filmed in 2007 when the site was CSU Channel Islands.
- Jonathan Kellerman's 2012 thriller Victims modeled its Ventura State Hospital after Camarillo State Hospital.
- In the Magnum, P.I. season three episode, "...By Its Cover", Magnum's old friend from the Navy, "Hot" Rod Crysler, says he served eighteen months at Camarillo for a marijuana possession charge.
- In the 1971 film The Incredible 2-Headed Transplant, serial killer Manuel Cass escapes from the hospital.
- Frank Zappa's song Camarillo Brillo details a romantic encounter with an eccentric woman whose hair resembles that of a patient who just underwent shock therapy.
- "Ready for Camarillo" by Ambrosia closes their Life Beyond L.A. record, detailing mental exhaustion.
- "The Clouds in Camarillo" by Brazzaville is based on a letter by a patient at the hospital.
