= Konchitsya leto =

Song by Kino

from the album Black Album
- Language: Russian
- English title: Summer will end
- Written: 1990
- Released: 1990
- Recorded: 1990
- Genre: Post-punk; folk-punk
- Length: 5:56
- Label: Metadigital
- Songwriter: Viktor Tsoi

Music video
- "Лето" on YouTube

"Konchitsya leto" (Russian: Кончится лето, lit. 'Summer is ending' or 'Summer will end'), also referred to as "Leto" (Лето, 'Summer') or "Ya zhdu otveta" (Я жду ответа, 'I'm waiting for an answer') and originally titled in the 1996 release as "Zhdu otveta", is a song by the Soviet rock group Kino from the Black Album, written in the spring of 1990 and released after the death of frontman Viktor Tsoi. The song was recorded at a port studio at a dacha in Plieņciems, Latvia, where Tsoi went to relax after a concert at Luzhniki Stadium.

== History ==
The song was written, along with others that later made it into the "Black Album", in the spring of 1990 in Natalia Razlogova's apartment in the Moscow district of Belyayevo, where Viktor and Natalia lived at the time. The recording was made on a household tape recorder with an acoustic guitar. Part of this recording with an incomplete first verse was subsequently published in 2018.

The recording for the future album was done in the summer of 1990 at the Yamaha MT-44 studio in the village of Plienciems near Jūrmala, in modern day Latvia. In Viktor's notebook, there is a draft of the track list, in which the song is called "Waiting for an Answer". After Tsoi's death, the recording was revised and released on the "Black Album" in January 1991.

A rough version of the song's mix was recorded prior in a sample cassette, and it was later released in 2002 as part of the "Poslednie zapisi" compilation (or "The Last Recordings").

== Analysis ==
According to E. I. Shadzhanova, the song "Summer Will End" ("Waiting for an Answer"), like all the songs of the "Black Album", is permeated with the expectation and premonition of death. In this song, as Shadzhanova notes, through the fact that movement is replaced by statics, the semantics of the concept of "dao" is realized and developed. The fact that external stimuli for action does not work, and there are no internal ones (there is no point in moving forward and there is no way to go back), and, according to Shadzhanova, lies the first significant moment for interpreting the concept of "dao".

The hero of the song, according to Shadzhanova, feels that he has reached a dead end or has finished his journey, having lost his inner incentive. In the last lines of the chorus ("... I'm waiting for an answer. / There are no more hopes. / Summer will soon end. / This..."), (Note: Russian: («…Я жду ответа. // Больше надежд нету. // Скоро кончится лето. // Это...»)) as Shadzhanova writes, the feeling of approaching death is concentrated. He further noted that the fact that Tsoi died on the road that same summer (August 15, 1990) caused the song to become more symbolic, as that summer actually became his last.

The very space in which the hero of the song exists, according to Shadzhanova, closes around him, enclosing the latter in the center of a closed cycle ("... and so year after year goes by", "for the hundredth time..."). (Note: Russian: («...и так идут за годом год», «в сотый раз...»)) Because of this feeling, the protagonist again feels hopeless and uncertain ("maybe there will be at least a day..."), (Note: Russian: («может, будет хоть день...»)) from which, it would seem, he has freed himself. Shadzhanova suggests that it is precisely this change that is connected with the feeling of approaching death that haunted Tsoi ("life will pass"). (Note: Russian: («жизнь пройдёт»))

According to N. K. Nezhdanova, the song "Summer Will End" ("Waiting for an Answer") is permeated with irony. The very existence in peace is described in the song ironically: "We eat for a day, and drink for three / And, in general, we live happily." (Note: Russian: «День едим, а три пьём // И, в общем, весело живём») The phrase "Rain outside the window" (Note: Russian: «Дождь за окном») in the song speaks of the existence of another world, where well-being is immoral. In the song, Viktor Tsoi's protagonist is closer to rain, it is his weather.

== Personnel ==
- Viktor Tsoi - vocals
- Yuri Kasparyan - lead guitar, backing vocals
- Igor Tikhomirov - bass guitar, synth bass
- Georgy Guryanov - "Yamaha RX-5" drum machine programming

== In art ==
The final credits of Kirill Serebrennikov's film "Leto" about the young Viktor Tsoi and the Leningrad underground rock culture of the early 1980s are accompanied by the song Konchitsya leto.

The song gave the title to the Russian-Kazakh film "Summer is Ending" (2023). The Kino TV channel reviewed the film, in which Ekaterina Zagvozdkina noted: "The film itself begins with a concert of Viktor Tsoi in the city of Almaty, and ends the day after his death, on August 15, 1990. This time is the Tsoi era, or rather, its very end, but the film tells a different story. One of the heroes, the leader of the yard punks, is a copy of Tsoi".

== Performances by other musicians ==
- In 2000, the song was recorded by the group "Kukryniksy" for the tribute project "KINOproby".
- In 2012, at the concert "Viktor Tsoi. 50 years!" in the Olympic SC, the song was performed by the groups "Kukryniksy" and "U-Piter".
- In 2018, Leonid Agutin created his own version of the song together with the group "Esperanto", adding trumpets and additional drums to it. Agutin also shot a video for the song with footage from the festival "KINOproby. Solstice" in Okulovka.
- In 2018, a studio version of the song was released by Neuromonk Feofan together with Daniil Svetlov, who first performed it at the KINOproby. Solstice festival in Okulovka that same year.
