= Krasno-Zhyoltye Dni =

Song by the Soviet band Kino

Song by Kino

from the album Black Album
- Language: Russian
- Released: January 12, 1991
- Recorded: 1990
- Length: 5:50
- Label: Megadigital
- Songwriter: Viktor Tsoi

Krasno-Zhyoltye Dni (Russian: Красно-Жёлтые Дни, romanized: Krasno-Zhyoltye Dni, meaning Red-Yellow Days or Reddish-Yellow Days) is a song by the Soviet band Kino. The song was included in the Black Album, the final studio album of the band before the lead singer, Viktor Tsoi's, death in 1990.

The song is a continuation of the song Stuk (meaning 'knock'), from the album Zvezda po Imeni Solntse, with the main mood being sadness and toska (an emotion, characterised by sadness, nostalgia, ennui and yearning).

== History ==
In the early 1990s, Kino went on a tour of the Soviet Union, its last with Viktor Tsoi. The demo version of the song was written during the tour, including others included on the Black Album, in the Latvian city of Jūrmala. After their concert at Luzhinki Stadium on June 24, in Moscow, they went to Tsoi's apartment with his friends Natalia Razlogova and Rashid Nugmanov and sung songs later included on the Black Album, recorded by Nugmanov on a dictaphone.

The same summer, Tsoi and Yuri Kasparyan again recorded a demo of some of the songs on the Black Album in Plieņciems, a village in Latvia. Kasparyan says that work was slow, in "some kind of shed". The only song Krasno-Zhyoltye Dni was finished, included on Poslednie Zapisi. Kasparyan took one recording to Leningrad, while Tsoi kept another in his car.

== Personnel ==
- Viktor Tsoi (Russian: Виктор Цой): vocals, guitar
- Yuri Kasparyan (Russian: Юрий Каспарян): guitar
- Igor Tikhomirov (Russian: Игорь Тихомиров): bass guitar
- Georgy Guryanov (Russian: Георгий Гурьянов): drums
- Yuri Aizenshpis (Russian: Юрий Айзеншпис): producer
- Jean Taxi: mixing (Studio Val d'Orge, Paris, France)
