= Yamaha PTX8 =

Percussion Tone Generator

- Manufacturer: Yamaha
- Dates: 1986

Technical specifications
- Polyphony: 8 voice
- Timbrality: 8-instrument multi-timberal
- Synthesis type: Sample-based synthesis
- Storage memory: 32 Kits, 64 Voice, 10 Chain Memories. Accepts RAM 4 to store part of all of the PTX8 internal memory.
- Hardware: 2 RU case, LED MEM Number, two-line 16-character LCD, ROM and RAM data cartridge slots, headphone jack, R / L (mono) output, 1-8 individual outputs

Input/output
- External control: PAD In 1-8, Memory select (dec / inc), Foot SW, MIDI Thru / Out / In.
- Audio sample: 12 bit companded PCM wave memory

The Yamaha PTX8 is a digital sample-based percussion tone generator built by Yamaha, in late 1986. It was included in the Yamaha D8 electronic drum kit.

== Features ==
The Yamaha PTX8 Percussion Tone Generator is an 8-instrument multi-timbral tone generator, that can be played from D8 percussion pads (PSD8, PTT8, PBD8) or via MIDI.

=== External control ===
Unlike the Yamaha PMC1 Percussion Control Module, the PTX8 is both a tone generator and trigger module. The PTX8 includes eight 1/4 TS input jacks for connecting the Yamaha EPS-D8 drum pads. The PTX8 is not compatible with later SYSTEM 1 drum pads (PTT1 or PBD1) which used XLR cables.

=== Voice Synthesis ===
The PTX8 includes 12 bit companded PCM wave memory synthesis type. The production of sound is organized into waveforms, voices, kits, and chains as follows:

- Includes 26 internal preset waveforms (additional waveforms can be imported from ROM cartridges) which can be edited to create Voices.
- Up to 64 different voices can be stored in internal memory and a RAM 4 cartridge.
- Each of the 8 independent tone generators can play one of the 64 internal Voices (RAM 4 Voices must be imported before using them).
- These voices receive their own Pitch, Bend, Attack/Decay, Volume, Reverse, and wave loop settings (Panning is not adjustable).
- 32 "Kit" memories stores a combination of settings for the 8 tone generators. 32 more drum kits can be stored on RAM4 data cartridge.
- Up to 10 kit memories can be programmed in a "Chain" and stepped through using a footswitch or pad.

=== Audio output ===
The PTX8 has mixed stereo L/R outputs and 8 individual outputs (one per Tone Generator). When none of the individual outputs are being used, tone generators are panned across the stereo output. Tone generators 3 & 4 are panned left, 1, 2, 7, & 8 are panned center; 5 & 6 are panned right. When an individual output is connected, its signal is removed from the stereo mix.

=== Midi ===
The Yamaha PTX8 transmits and receives MIDI messages. Includes MIDI IN / OUT / THRU terminals on the back of the unit. Responds to not on/off and program change. Internal memory can be requested and transmitted via SYSEX.

=== Sound library ===
The voices for the PTX8 were available on 3.5" disks created for the DX7 II FD.

== Waveform ROM cartridges ==
These waveform ROM cartridges can be used with both the Yamaha RX-5 Digital Rhythm Programmer and the PTX8 Percussion Tome Generator .

- Yamaha WRC01 - RX5 ROM
- Yamaha WRC02 - Jazz/Fusion
- Yamaha WRC03 - Heavy Metal
- Yamaha WRC04 - Effect

=== Yamaha WRC01 - RX5 ROM ===
The WRC01 waveform cartridge, incorporates 28 voices including drum, percussion, and sound effects. The "RX5 ROM' cartridge was shipped with the Yamaha RX5 Digital Rhythm Programmer.

Yamaha WRC01 VOICES
1. SD 3	15. TIMPANI
2. BD 3	16. GLASS CRASH
3. CONGA H MUTE	17. GUN
4. CONGA H OPEN	18. FM PERC 1
5. CONGA L	19. FM PERC 2
6. BONGO H	20. FM PERC 3
7. BONGO L	21. E BASS H
8. TIMBALE H	22. E BASS L
9. TIMBALE L	23. DX ORCHESTRA
10. AGOGO H	24. DX MARIMBA
11. AGOGO L	25. DX CLAVINET
12. CUICA	26. HEY
13. CASTANET	27. WAO
14. WHISTLE	28 Ooo

=== Yamaha WRC02 - Jazz/Fusion ===
The WRC02 incorporates 25 voices used in jazz or fusion music.

Yamaha WRC02 VOICES
1. JAZZ BD 1	15. JAZZ TOM 1
2. JAZZ BD 2	16. JAZZ TOM 2
3. FUSION BD 1	17. JAZZ TOM 3
4. FUSION BD 2	18. FUSION TOM 1
5. ELECTRIC BD	19. FUSION TOM 2
6. JAZZ SD 1	20. FUSION TOM 3
7. JAZZ SD 2	21. OPEN HH
8. PICCOLO SD	22. CLOSED HH
9. FUSION SD	23. PEDAL HH
10. ELECTRIC SD	24. COWBELL
11. FLAT RIDE CY	25. FINGER BASS
12. CY BRUSH HIT	
13. GUITAR DOWN	
14. GUITAR UP	

=== Yamaha WRC03 - heavy metal ===
The WRC03 incorporates 15 voices used in heavy metal music.

Yamaha WRC03 VOICES
1. HEAVY BD 1	15. GUITAR 5TH
2. HEAVY BD 2	
3. HEAVY BD 3	
4. HEAVY SD 1	
5. HEAVY SD 2	
6. HEAVY SD 3	
7. HEAVY SD 4	
8. MALLET CRASH	
9. HEAVY TOM 1	
10. HEAVY TOM 2	
11. HEAVY TOM 3	
12. HEAVY TOM 4	
13. PICKED BASS	
14. GUITAR SINGLE	

=== Yamaha WRC04 - effect ===
The WRC04 incorporates 19 voices used for "effective" sound. Because of the cartridge name it was thought to contain sound effects, instead of the processed drum sounds within.

Yamaha WRC04 VOICES
1. PROCESS BD 1	15. PROCESS ROTO
2. PROCESS BD 2	16. HYBRID TOM
3. PROCESS BD 3	17. SPLASH CYM
4. PROCESS SD 1	18. DOOR SLAM
5. PROCESS SD 2	19. SYNTH BASS
6. PROCESS SD 3	
7. PROCESS SD 4	
8. PROCESS SD 5	
9. PROCESS SD 6	
10. PROCESS TOM 1	
11. PROCESS TOM 2	
12. PROCESS TOM 3	
13. FM TOM	
14. FM SD	

== Notable users/endorsers ==
- Bobby Blotzer (Ratt)
- Peter Erskine

== Owner's manual ==
- PTX8 Percussion tone Generator: Owner's Manual (eng, fr, ger)
