= Soyuz Microphones =

Audio equipment manufacturer in Tula, Russia

Soyuz Союз
- Trade name: OOO "Baikal Microphones"
- Type: Private
- Industry: Audio equipment
- Founded: 2013; 13 years ago
- Founder: David Arthur Brown; Pavel Bazdyrev
- Headquarters: Tula, Russia
- Area served: Worldwide
- Products: Microphones, Preamplifiers
- Brands: Soyuz; Tula Mics
- Website: soyuzmicrophones.com

Soyuz (Russian: Союз, lit. 'Union') is a manufacturer of boutique professional recording microphones and preamplifiers based in Tula, Russia. The company was founded in 2013 by David Arthur Brown, the lead vocalist for the US band Brazzaville, as well as Russian entrepreneur Pavel Bazdyrev. The company is headquartered in Tula, Russia and also has a presence in Los Angeles and Prague.

The company has achieved world renown from a number of musicians, sound engineers and producers. Its products are handmade, with most components built in-house, with the exception of vacuum tubes which are supplied from a nearby factory.

== History ==
David Arthur Brown

Soyuz was founded in 2013 by Russian entrepreneur Pavel Bazdyrev, who had previously worked as a manager for the confectionery company Mars, and American musician David Arthur Brown, formerly of the indie-pop band Brazzaville. Following a performance in Kasnodar, Bazdyrev approached Brown and requested that he perform in the city of Tula. Brown recognised the name of the city, due to its association with the Russian state manufacturer Oktava, which had exported microphones around the world following the economic chaos of the dissolution of the Soviet Union. In particular, Brown remembered the presence of the microphones at Guitar Center, which offered affordable condenser microphones prior to the advent of Chinese mass-manufactured models.

Brown was offered a tour of the Oktava factory in Tula, only to find the company in a dire state, having lost its distributors in the United Kingdom and the United States, and unable to compete with Chinese competitors. Bazdyrev suggested that the two could offer to work with Oktava, but this was dismissed following the large-scale restructuring of the company by its parent, the State Corporation "Rostec". As a result, the two decided to start their own company, with a focus on quality and design, rather than mass manufacturing.

Brown and Bazdyrev additionally wished to break the notion that Russia "doesn't produce anything that anybody wants to buy except oil, gas and arms. David had the idea that through combining American marketing and quality control with Russian engineering, it would be possible to create equipment that exceeded what each could produce on their own, on par with brands such as Neumann or AKG, but with their own distinct character. This philosophy was embodied in the name of the company, meaning 'Union' in Russian.

The Russians have all this technology, old classic technology that they still use; tubes and manual lathes. I thought that if somebody could do some nice designs that could combine Western design and marketing with classic Russian technology, maybe it would be possible to make a mic that's as good as the classics without being a copy of them. My reasoning was that the Soviet Union developed in parallel with the West. We made rockets. They made rockets. We made tanks. They made tanks. We made mics. They made mics. So, they have this rich technological tradition but there wasn't a tradition of marketing.

The duo established their own production facilities in a small warehouse on the outskirts of Tula, acquired a second-hand IZH-250 lathe, and hiring several experts in radio-electronics machine-building experts who had previously worked in the arms industry. In this regard, Brown described the company as embodying the idea of swords into ploughshares, using equipment and expertise that were formally used for arms production for "creating music and spreading goodwill." The entrepreneurs stated that they never had to pay bribes, but were initially treated with suspicion by local officials, who suspected the company to be a front for money laundering. This was however, dispelled upon the visit of a tax inspector to the companies workshop.

By 2014, several prototypes were built, with Brown sending several batches to musicians that he knew, including Nigel Godrich and Al Schmitt. The group received positive feedback from Godrich, who ordered several more microphones. Soon after, Soyuz received another investor, when Brown was recognised by a passenger while travelling aboard the Sapsan high speed train.

== Products ==
=== Microphones ===
==== Soyuz ====
- 011 FET Condenser Microphone
- 013 Series Condenser Microphone
- 013 Ambisonic Microphone
- 017 Series Condenser Microphone
- 023 Series "Bomblet" Condenser Microphone
- Soyuz 1973 Condenser Microphone
- Soyuz V1 Dynamic Microphone

==== Tula ====
- Tula Mobile Recorder and USB Microphone

=== Preamplifiers ===
- Soyuz Launcher Inline Active Preamp
- Soyuz Lakeside Single-channel Class-A Preamp

== Marketing ==
=== Design ===
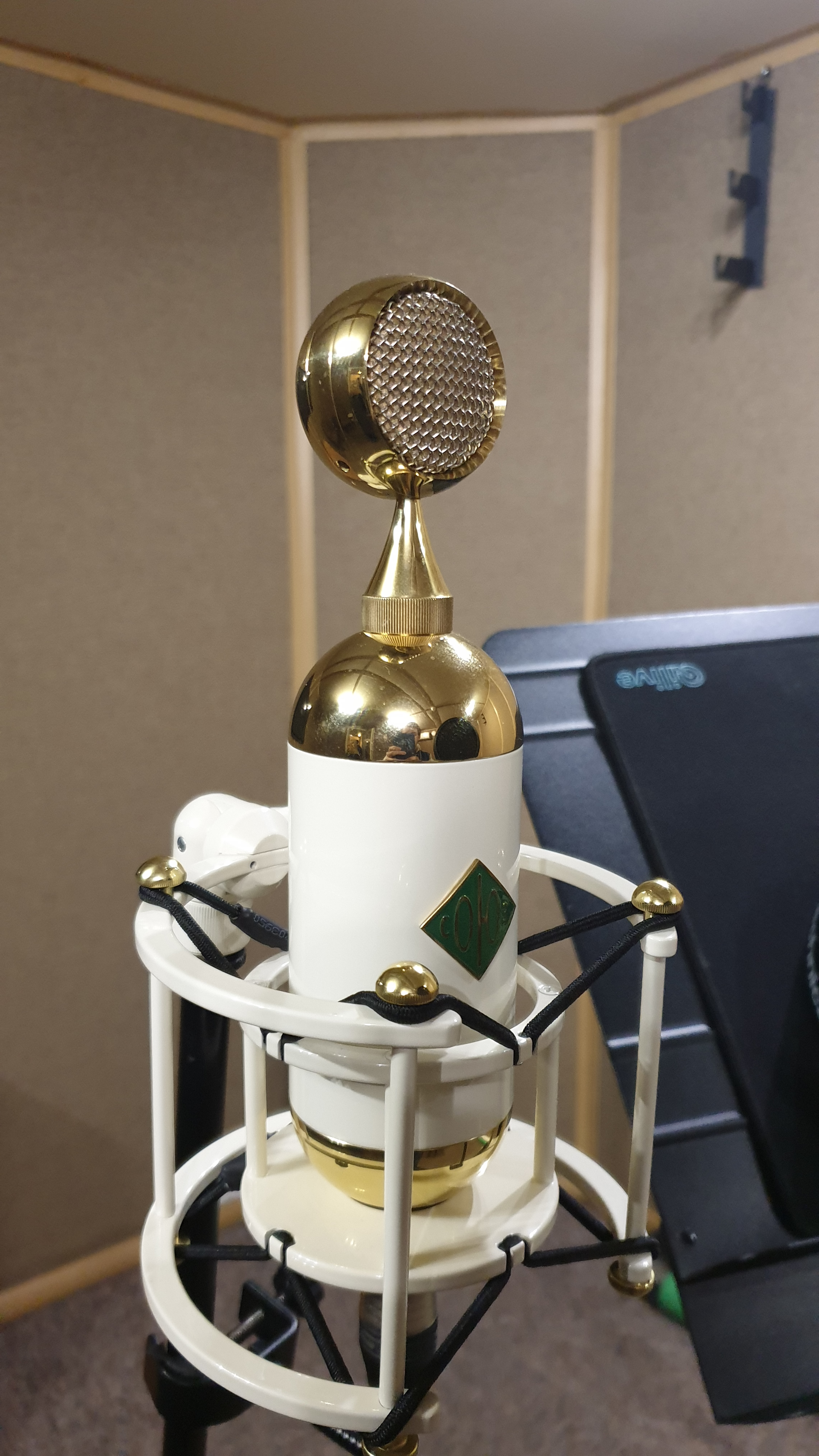
Soyuz 023 Series "Bomblet" Condenser Microphone

Influenced by the metalworking heritage of the city of Tula, Soyuz Microphones draw inspiration from Soviet and Russian design traditions, combining the functional engineered minimalism of the Soviet space program as well as the opulence and transcendence of traditional Russian architecture.

=== Branding ===
According to David Arthur Brown the name Soyuz, meaning Union in Russian was chosen in order to emphasise the collaborative nature of combining Russian engineering with Western marketing expertise, in particular reference to the joint Apollo–Soyuz project, and the former name of the Soviet Union. Initially it was planned to name the company Baikal Microphones, in reference to the clarity of Lake Baikal. However, this was dropped after its similarity with the Guangdong based Enping Baikal Audio Equipment Company was noted. Nonetheless, the company remains legally incorporated with this earlier name.

In 2020, the company launched a subsidiary brand named Tula Mics, producing a consumer oriented USB microphone.

== Notable users ==
Soyuz microphones are used by a large number of musicians, television personalities and bloggers including Metallica, Coldplay, Radiohead, Paramore, The Lumineers, Shawn Mendes, Sam Smith, Svetlana Surganova, Larisa Dolina, Artemy Lebedev, Yuri Antonov, Valeriya, Maxim Fadeev and Nikolay Baskov.

Sound engineers and producers that use Soyuz microphones include:

- Butch Walker
- Greg Wells
- John Fryer
- Nigel Godrich
- Rob Schnapf
- Steve Albini
- Sylvia Massy

== See also ==
- List of microphone manufacturers
- Oktava
