= Zvezda po imeni Solntse (song) =

Song by Kino

from the album Zvezda po imeni Solntse
- Language: Russian
- English title: A Star Called the Sun
- Released: 1989
- Recorded: 1988
- Genre: New wave; alternative rock; post punk
- Songwriter: Viktor Tsoi
- Composer: Viktor Tsoi

"Zvezda po imeni Solntse" (Russian: «Звезда по имени Солнце», lit. 'A star called the Sun') is a song by the Soviet rock band Kino from the album of the same name released in 1988. The song is generally considered to be one of Kino's most popular songs. It is popular among novice guitarists in Eastern Europe, and there are many cover versions. The song is broadcast daily by Russian radio stations.

== Cover versions ==
The American indie pop band Brazzaville recorded a cover version of the song in English called "Star Called Sun" for their 2006 album, East L.A. Breeze. The lyrics are not a direct translation, but are instead about the death of the singer's mother.

Near a star, called sun,

It was there that my mom came undone

Sounds of a summer parade

90.5 in the shade

— "Star Called Sun", Brazzaville

The song was sung in Udmurt by the folklore band Buranovskiye Babushki (Udmurt: Брангуртысь песянайёс, Russian: Бурановские бабушки). Praskovia Fyodorova translated the song into Udmurt.

Vyacheslav Butusov recorded the song for the 2000 tribute album to Kino, KINOproby (Russian: КИНОпробы). Butusov has also played the song in concerts with his band U-Piter. It is part of a concert program of «Imya zvyozd».

Cover versions have also been made by Inspector, Mara, Natali, and Rybin-band.

The science fiction writer Vladimir Vasilyev wrote a fourth verse for the song in his book Black Palmira's Face (Russian: Лик Черной Пальмиры), which takes place in the same universe as Sergei Lukyanenko's Watch series.

== Personnel ==
The artists performing the album version of the song are:

- Viktor Tsoi — vocals, guitar
- Yuri Kasparyan — lead guitar
- Igor Tikhomirov — bass guitar
- Georgiy Guryanov — drums

== Legacy ==
Nashe Radio ranked the song 12th on its list of the "Top 100 Songs of the 20th Century".
