= Natali (singer) =

Russian singer (born 1974)

Natali Натали
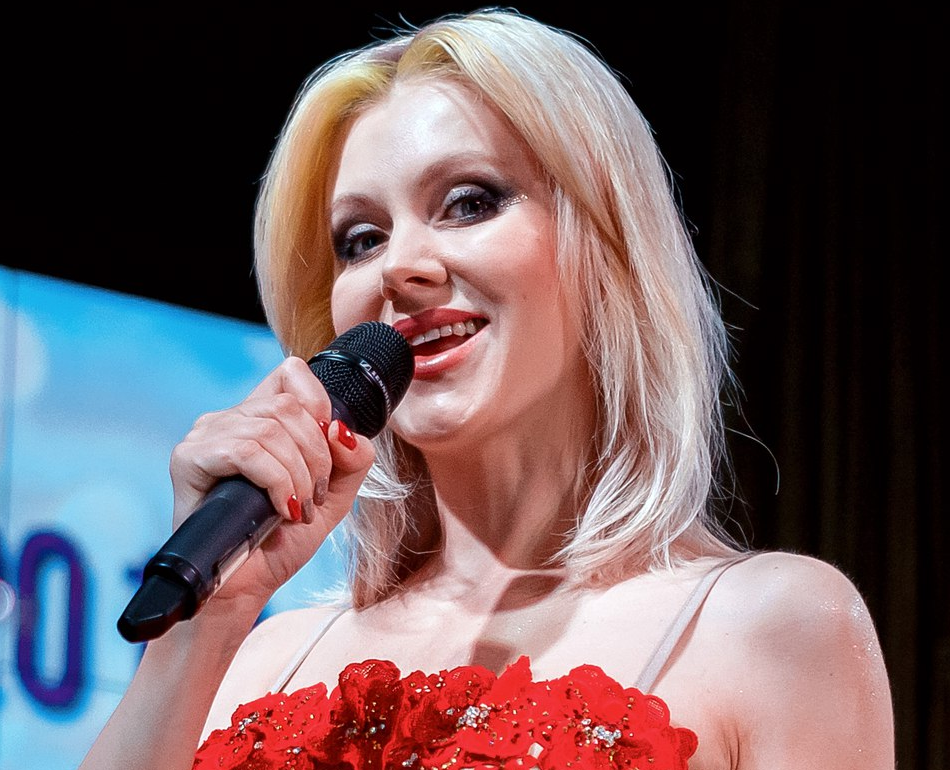

Background information
- Born: Natalia Anatolievna Minyayeva (Наталья Анатольевна Миняева); 31 March 1974 (age 52); Dzerzhinsk, RSFSR, Soviet Union
- Genres: Pop, folk
- Occupations: Singer, composer, songwriter, television presenter
- Instrument: Vocals
- Years active: 1990–present
- Website: www.nataliru.ru

Natalia Anatolievna Rudina (Russian: Наталья Анатольевна Рудина, 31 March 1974), née Minyayeva (Миняева), better known by stage name Natali (Натали), is a Russian singer, composer, songwriter, and TV presenter.

Initially regarded as a one-hit wonder for her 1997 song "Veter s morya dul" (Ветер с моря дул; Wind Was Blowing From Sea), Natali released a string of commercially successful singles in the early 2010s, of which her 2013 song "O Bozhe, kakoy muzhchina" (О Боже, какой мужчина!; Oh My God, What a Man!) is best known.

== Early life ==
Natali was born in the provincial city of Dzerzhinsk in 1974 in a family of a factory worker and a laboratory worker. She was noted to be academically competent and was an active student. At the age of 13, she persuaded her parents to let her have piano lessons and later, she taught herself to play guitar. At the age of 16, she starred in a Lenfilm production called Moy gorod, in which she portrayed a student.

== Career ==
As a teen, she was active in music festivals and performed with her siblings as part of the musical group Shokoladnyi bar. Later, under the supervision of Alexander Rudin (1970–2023), that group released two albums. Natali married Rudin at the age of 17 in 1991. Two years later, the couple moved to Moscow to develop Natali's career. She took on the pseudonym Natali while working with her first producer Valery Ivanov, stating later that it was derived from a nickname she had in school.

Natali released her first album Rusalochka in 1994, but it did not cause her a big breakthrough. A subsequent album Snezhnaya rozha helped her further acquire fame in her home town, but did not result in nationwide success. Her big break came with the release of "Veter s morya dul", which she had partially penned herself, in 1997. The song became one of the biggest hits that year in Russia and surrounding countries. Her subsequent album Veter s morya was among the most-sold albums that year in Russia. She debuted at Pesnya goda in 1998 with the song "Kak zhal'".

With "Veter s morya dul", Natali performed at Pesnya goda in 1999. Her next large hit was "Cherepashka" in 2000, albeit it did not reach up to the popularity of "Veter s morya dul". After the turn of the century, her fame started to drastically decline. Despite not appearing in charts and on television frequently, she continued performing in night clubs throughout the 2000s. In a 2005 article, Komsomolskaya Pravda regarded her as a "forgotten star".

In 2008, Natali participated in the NTV television project Superstar-2008. After that, she released her ninth studio album Semnadtsat' mgnoveniy lyubvi. The album was a commercial failure.

After several years of living in the shadows, Natali recorded her first single in eight years in 2012. On 5 November 2012, she released "O Bozhe, kakoy muzhchina!". The song received public attention following an appearance of Natali in the Russian talkshow Let Them Talk in April 2013, when she discussed how her life had developed fifteen years since her biggest and only hit. The single became a sleeper hit, acquiring most of its airplay in the Summer of 2013. The single then became the most rotated track on Russkoe Radio, although it only reached #188 in the TopHit airplay charts. Its music video, released in February 2013, became one of the most-watched videos on Russian YouTube throughout 2013 and 2014.

Following the commercial success of "O Bozhe, kakoy muzhchina!", Natali received her first Golden Gramophone Award from Russkoe Radio. During the 2013 RU.TV Awards, Natali received the tongue-in-cheek award Sometimes, They Return. She returned to Pesnya goda with the song after a fourteen year break.

In October 2013, Natali recorded a duet with Nikolay Baskov, titled "Nikolay". The song peaked at #34 of the TopHit airplay charts and gave Natali another Golden Gramophone Award, in 2014. Together with Baskov, Natali appeared on a plethora of musical television programmes, including Saturday evening and Miss Russkoe Radio.

Natali participated in the first season of the Russian adaption of Your Face Sounds Familiar. on Channel One Russia in 2014. Later that year, she released her first studio album in five years, titled Shakherezada.

In early 2015, Natali teamed up with MC Doni to release the song "Ty takoy". The track peaked at #24 at the TopHit airplay charts, but its music video quickly received attention on YouTube, where it became the first Russian-language song to receive over 100 million views in July 2016. In late 2016, Natali started withdrawing more from public life. In April 2017, she gave birth to her third son.

With "U menya est' tol'ko ty", she appeared in the 2017 edition of Pesnya goda. The song subsequently peaked at #87 on the TopHit airplay charts. In 2020, Natali released her eleventh studio album Novye 80-e.

== Private life ==
Natali has been married to Alexander Rudin (1970–2023) since 1991 and has three sons – Arseni (born 2001), Anatoly (born 2010), Evgeni (born 2017).

In an interview in the television show Let Them Talk in 2013, Natali said the inability of being able to conceive a child with her husband until the birth of their first son had led to her having suicidal thoughts.

== Discography ==
Studio albums

- 1990 – "Супербой" (with "Поп-Галактика"; Superboy)
- 1991 – "Звёздный Дождь" (with "Поп-Галактика"; Star Rain)
- 1994 – "Русалочка" (Mermaid)
- 1996 – "Снежная роза" (Snowy Rose)
- 1998 – "Ветер с моря" (Wind From the Sea)
- 1999 – "Считалочка" (Counting)
- 2000 – "Первая любовь" (First Love)
- 2001 – "Красавица – не красавица" (Remix album) (Beauty - is not beautiful)
- 2002 – "Не влюбляйся" (Do Not Fall in Love)
- 2004 – "Всё, что мне надо" (All That I Need)
- 2009 – "Семнадцать мгновений любви" (Seventeen Moments of Love)
- 2014 – "Шахерезада" (Scheherazade)
- 2016 – "О, Боже, какой мужчина!" (Oh My God, What a Man!) – reissue of the album "Шахерезада"

Singles

- 1995 – "Розовый рассвет"
- 1996 – "Снежная роза"
- 1996 – "Звезда по имени Солнце" (cover for a Viktor Tsoi song)
- 1997 – "Ветер с моря дул"
- 1998 – "Облака"
- 1999 – "Не стерпелось, не слюбилось"
- 1999 – "Считалочка"
- 2000 – "Черепашка"
- 2000 – "Первая любовь"
- 2001 – "Часто-часто"
- 2002 – "Конфетка"
- 2002 – "Мир без тебя"
- 2003 – "Море цвета джинсов"
- 2003 – "Всё, что мне надо"
- 2004 – "Вот как"
- 2006 – "Ветер с моря дул (Remake)" (2006 version)
- 2012 – "О Боже, какой мужчина!"
- 2013 – "Николай" (duet with Nikolay Baskov)
- 2014 – "Шахерезада"
- 2014 – "Платье на бретелях"
- 2014 – "Давай со мной за звёздами"
- 2014 – "Ветер с моря дул" (2014 version)
- 2014 – "Вишня (Расцвела под окошком)" (MP3 Play)
- 2014 – "Новогодняя"
- 2015 – "Ты такой" (duet with MC Doni)
- 2015 – "Володя"
- 2016 – ″Спроси Пригожина″
- 2017 – ″У меня есть только ты″
- 2018 – ″Я без оружия″ (with band Sultan Uragan)
- 2019 – ″Мужчина-мечта″
- 2020 – ″Поехали на дачу″
- 2021 – ″Белая зима″
- 2022 – ″Тест грусти″
- 2022 – ″Хештег″
- 2023 – ″Будут танцы″
- 2024 – "Хоопонопоно"
- 2025 – "По любви"

Compilations

- 1998 – "Провинциальная девчонка" (Provincial girl)
- 2002 – "The Best: Лучшие хиты" (The Best: Greatest Hits)
- 2003 – "Гармония" (Harmony)
- 2004 – "Я люблю тебя: новое и лучшее" (I love you: new and better)

== Videos ==
Year	Title	Director	Album
1996	"Снежная роза"	Григорий Константинопольский	"Снежная роза"
1996	"Звезда по имени Солнце"	Игорь Зайцев	"Ветер с моря"
1997	"Ветер с моря дул"	Игорь Зайцев	"Ветер с моря"
1998	"Облака"	Игорь Зайцев	"Считалочка"
1999	"Не стерпелось, не слюбилось"	Игорь Зайцев	"Считалочка"
1999	"Считалочка"	Игорь Зайцев	"Считалочка"
2000	"Черепашка"	Игорь Зайцев	"Первая любовь"
2000	"Первая любовь"	Игорь Зайцев	"Первая любовь"
2001	"Часто-Часто"	Игорь Зайцев	"Красавица – не красавица"
2002	"Конфетка"	Сергей Антонов	"Не влюбляйся"
2002	"Мир без тебя"	Георгий Тоидзе	"Не влюбляйся"
2003	"Море цвета джинсов"	Игорь Зайцев	"Всё, что мне надо"
2003	"Всё, что мне надо"	Игорь Зайцев	"Всё, что мне надо"
2004	"Вот как"	Игорь Зайцев	"Всё, что мне надо"
2006	"Ветер с моря дул (Remake)" (версия 2006 года)	Альберт Хамитов	"Семнадцать мгновений любви"
2013	"О Боже, какой мужчина!"	Мария Скобелева	"Шахерезада"
2013	"Николай" (duet with Nikolay Baskov)	Сергей Ткаченко	"Шахерезада"
2014	"Шахерезада"	Мария Скобелева	"Шахерезада"
2014	"Платье на бретелях"	Мария Скобелева	"Шахерезада"
2014	"Новогодняя"	Мария Скобелева	"Шахерезада"
2015	"Ты такой" (duet with MC Doni)	Рустам Романов	"О, Боже, какой мужчина!"
2015	"Володя"	Рустам Романов	"О, Боже, какой мужчина!"
2017	″У меня есть только ты″	Рустам Романов	TBA
2018	″Я без оружия″ (with band ″Sultan Uragan″)	Рустам Романов	TBA
2020	"Поехали на дачу"	Мария Скобелева	TBA
2021	″Белая зима″	Степан Разин	TBA
2022	″Тест грусти″	Арсений Рудин	TBA
2022	″Хештег″	Степан Разин	TBA
2023	″Будут танцы″	Арсений Рудин	TBA
2024	"Хоопонопоно"	Мария Скобелева	TBA
2025	"По любви"	Мария Скобелева	TBA

== Awards and nominations ==
Year	Award	Nominated work	Category	Result
2013	RU.TV Award	"О Боже, какой мужчина"	Иногда они возвращаются	Won
2013	Golden Gramophone Award	"О Боже, какой мужчина"	Best Song of the Year	Won
2013	Красная звезда	"О Боже, какой мужчина"	Top 20 Best Songs of the Year	Won
2013	Реальная премия MusicBox	"О Боже, какой мужчина"	Номинация 100% GOLD	Won
2014	RU.TV Award	"Николай"	Best videoclip	Won
2014	Golden Gramophone Award	"Николай"	Best Song of the Year	Won
