= Welcome to... Brazzaville =

Welcome to… Brazzaville

Studio album by Brazzaville
- Released: 2004
- Recorded: 1998–2004/05
- Genre: Indie Pop, Bossa nova, Chamber Pop
- Length: ???
- Label: Web of Mimicry

Brazzaville chronology
Rouge On Pockmarked Cheeks (2002)	Welcome to… Brazzaville (2004)	Hastings Street (2004)

Welcome to… Brazzaville is a best of songs album by the indie group Brazzaville. It was released in two editions. At first, it was put together when only three albums of the Brazzaville were recorded; the next time Welcome to… was released in Russia—after Hastings Street became available—so Welcome to... now had songs from the four albums, a different track list and two additional non-album songs (four in sum).

== Track listing ==
=== 2004 release ===
The original release of Welcome to… Brazzaville by Web of Mimicry

1. "Super Gizi"
2. "Foreign Disaster Days"
3. "Boeing"
4. "Casa Batllo"
5. "Queenie"
6. "Genoa"
7. "Motel Room"
8. "Voce"
9. "Sewers of Bangkok"
10. "Rainy Night"
11. "4 AM Osaka"
12. "Christmas in E.C." [fully "Christmas in East Cirebon", a non-album track]
13. "Xanax and 3 Hours of T.V."
14. "Love Sky" [non-album track]
15. "High Life"

=== 2005 (Russian) release ===
Reissue by Zakat (Soyuz Records)

1. "Last Days" [non-album track]
2. "Hotel Ukraina" [non-album track]
3. "Super Gizi"
4. "Foreign Disaster Days"
5. "Night Train to Moscow"
6. "Casa Batllo"
7. "Queenie"
8. "Londres"
9. "Genoa"
10. "Motel Room"
11. "Lagos Slums"
12. "Voce"
13. "Sewers of Bangkok"
14. "Christmas in E.C." [non-album track]
15. "Love Sky" [non-album track]
16. "Rollin Easy." This track is a full version of "Intro" and "Interlude" released in Hastings Street album.

Non-album tracks are referred to as "Special Collector Tracks" on the back cover of the album.
