= Black Album (Kino album) =

Final studio album by Kino

Studio album by Kino
- Released: December 1990
- Recorded: Summer 1990 (demo); September–October 1990
- Studios: Guest house in Plieņciems, Latvia (demo & "studio" vocals); Videofilm (studio instrumental)
- Genres: Pop, indie rock, folk rock, new wave, post-punk
- Length: 48:08 (Moroz Records release); 42:28 (Maschina Records remaster)
- Language: Russian
- Labels: Metadigital; General Records (1994 rerelease); Moroz Records (1996 remaster); Maschina Records (2021 remaster)
- Producer: Yuri Aizenshpis

Kino chronology
Zvezda po imeni Solntse (1989)	Black Album (1990)

The seventh and final studio album of the Soviet rock group Kino was released in December 1990 by Metadigital on vinyl, without a title. It has become known colloquially as the Black Album (Russian: Чёрный альбом, romanized: Chorny albom), and sometimes just Kino. The rough demo version was recorded in the Latvian village Plieņciems and according to the guitarist of the group Yuri Kasparyan, finished on the 14th of August that year – the day before the death of the frontman Viktor Tsoi in a car crash. The remaining members of Kino completed the album as a tribute to Tsoi.

== History ==
The album's producer Yuri Aizenshpis said that the demo tape survived inside Tsoi's car when he crashed fatally, however the band's guitarist, Yuri Kasparyan, has disputed this and stated that it was in his own car and not Tsoi's. It was later revealed in a Russian forum that there were 2 copies of the demo, and the surviving tape from Tsoi's car were later used for release by Maschina Records in 2021, an Estonian-based label.

The song "Cuckoo" ("Кукушка") is considered by many fans to be an unwitting swan song for the band. The song's themes range from mortality to existential guilt. It became one of the band's most well-known songs.

It was originally released on vinyl by the studio Metadigital in December 1990. On this original vinyl issue, no track names were given, just the text, producer: Yuri Aizenshpis and a photo of the band. A lyric sheet was included, but the songs were just titled 1 to 8. The track names were revealed on the 1994 CD reissue by Moroz. In 2021, the original album was remastered and reissued by Maschina Records; Yuri Kasparyan, Igor Tikhomirov, and Viktor Tsoi's son, Alexander, were involved in the production and approval process.

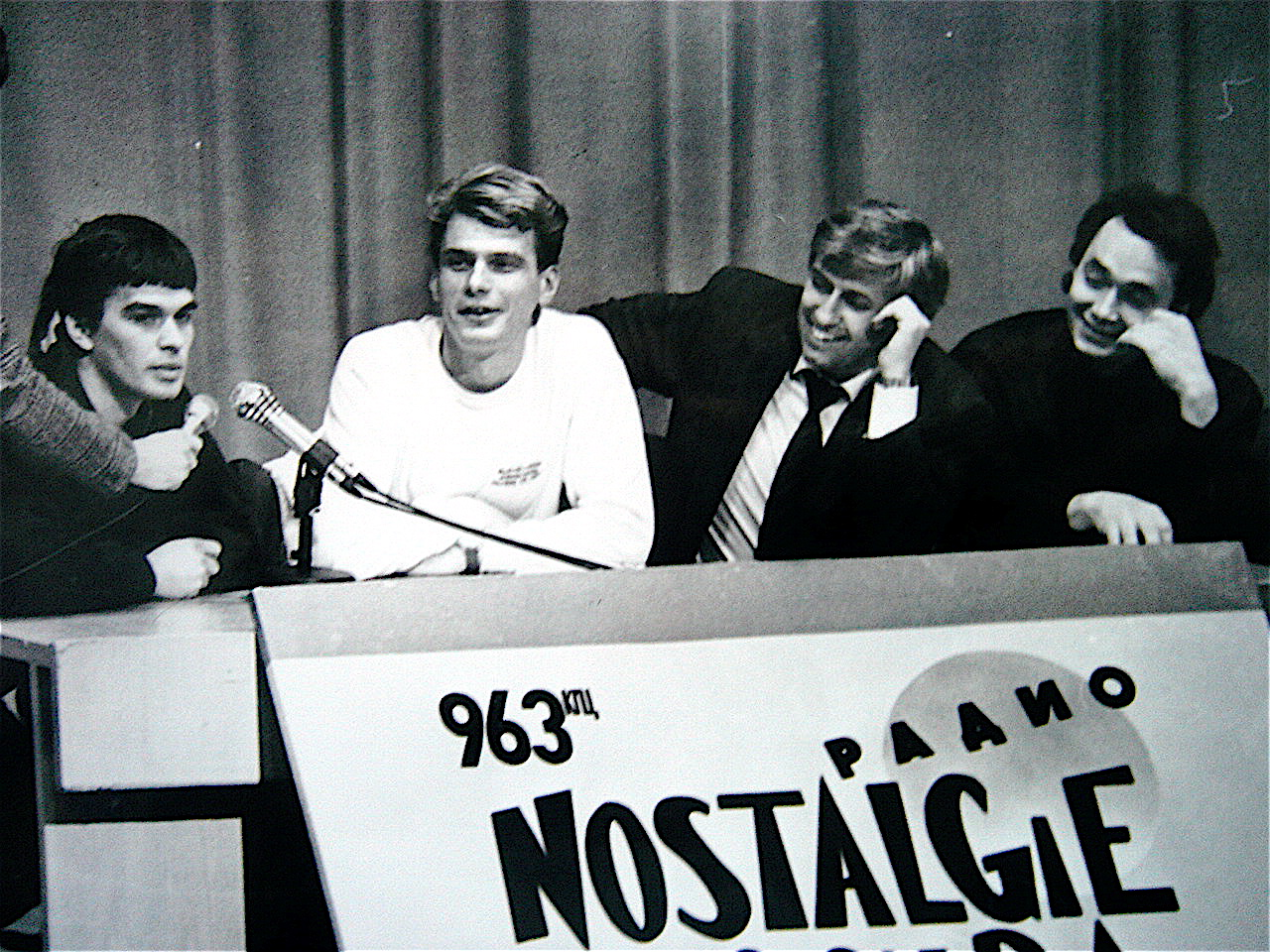
Album presentation in Moscow on January 12, 1991 (Yuri Kasparyan, Yevgeny Dodolev, Yuri Aizenshpis, Igor Tikhomirov)

== Track listing ==
All tracks are written by Viktor Tsoi.

No.	Title	Translation	Length
1.	"Konchitsya leto" (Russian: «Кончится лето»)	"Summer is Ending"	5:56
2.	"Krasno-Zhyoltye Dni" (Russian: «Красно-жёлтые дни»)	"Red-Yellow Days"	5:50
3.	"Nam s toboy" (Russian: «Нам с тобой»)	"(For) You and Me"	4:50
4.	"Zvezda" (Russian: «Звезда»)	"A Star"	4:30
5.	"Kukushka" (Russian: «Кукушка»)	"Cuckoo"	6:40
6.	"Kogda tvoya devushka bolʹna" (Russian: «Когда твоя девушка больна»)	"When Your Girlfriend is Sick"	4:21
7.	"Muraveynik" (Russian: «Муравейник»)	"Anthill"	5:18
8.	"Sledi za soboy" (Russian: «Следи за собой»)	"Watch Yourself"	5:00
Total length:			42:25

Bonus tracks on the 1996 Moroz Records reissue.
No.	Title	Translation	Length
9.	"Sosny na morskom beregu" (Russian: «Сосны на морском берегу»)	"Pinetrees on the Seashore"	5:17
10.	"Zavtra voyna" (Russian: «Завтра война»)	"Tomorrow is War"	0:35
Total length:			48:17

Tracks 9 and 10 were added to the 1996 remaster by Moroz Records. As stated above, the tracks did not have names until 1994, so fans made up their own names for these songs.

=== Maschina Records track listing ===
No.	Title	Translation	Length
1.	"Zhdu otveta" (Russian: «Жду ответа»)	"Waiting for a Reply"	5:55
2.	"Krasno-Zhyoltye Dni" (Russian: «Красно-жёлтые дни»)	"Red-Yellow Days"	5:50
3.	"Nam s toboy" (Russian: «Нам с тобой»)	"(For) You and Me"	4:49
4.	"Volchiy voy" (Russian: «Волчий вой»)	"Wolf's Howl"	4:30
5.	"Kukushka" (Russian: «Кукушка»)	"Cuckoo"	6:39
6.	"Kogda tvoya devushka bolʹna" (Russian: «Когда твоя девушка больна»)	"When Your Girlfriend is Sick"	4:19
7.	"Ya ne lyublyu, kogda mne vrut" (Russian: «Я не люблю, когда мне врут»)	"I Don't Like Being Lied To"	5:17
8.	"Sledi za soboy" (Russian: «Следи за собой»)	"Watch Yourself"	5:00
Total length:			42:16

== Personnel ==
- Viktor Tsoi – vocals, guitar
- Yuri Kasparyan – lead guitar
- Igor Tikhomirov – bass guitar
- Georgy Guryanov – drum machine
