= Oktava =

Russian microphone manufacturer

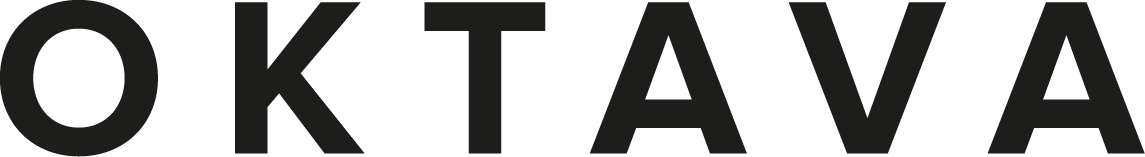

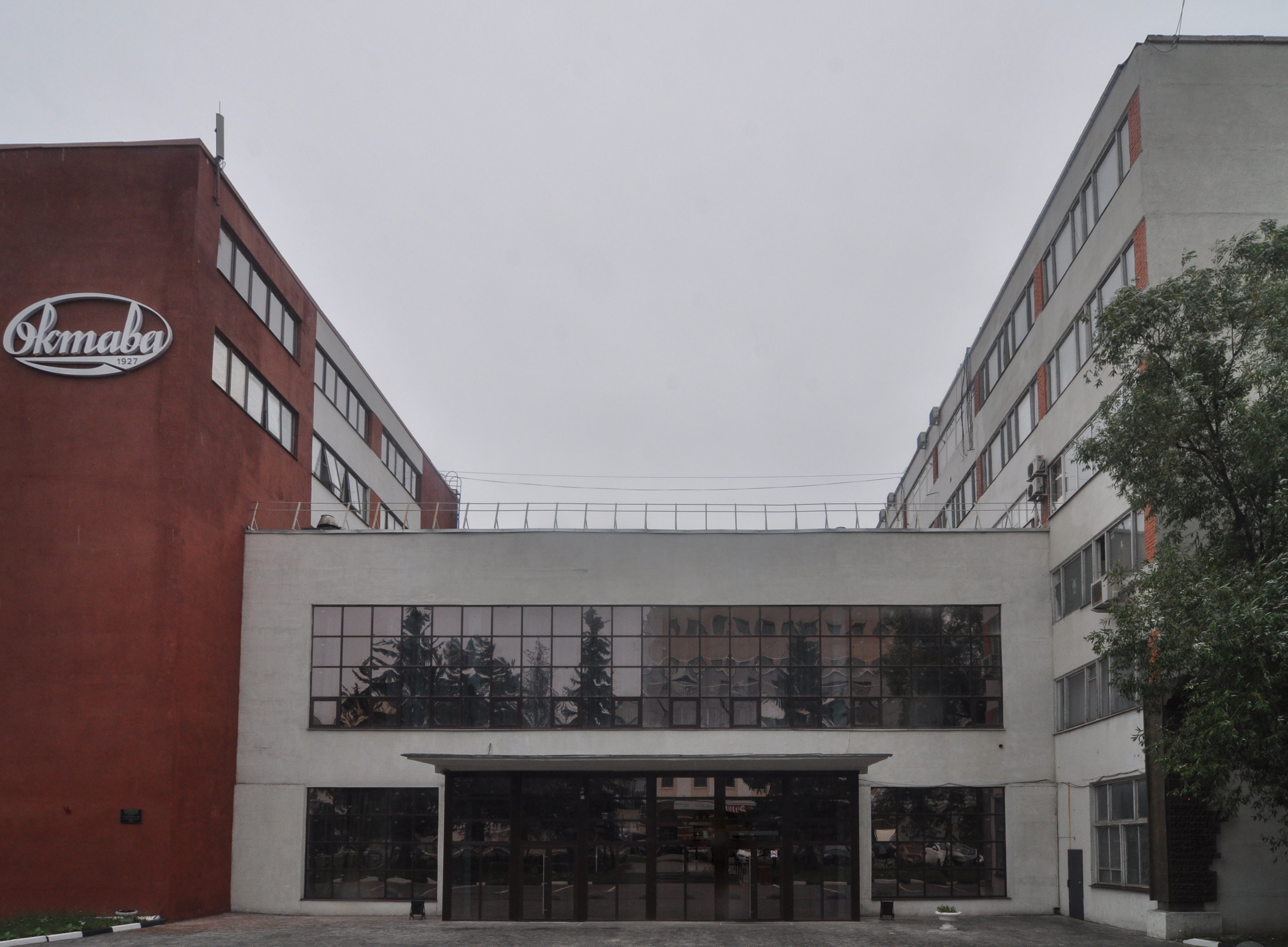
- Oktava headquarters in Tula, Russia
- Company type: Joint-stock company
- Industry: Audio electronics
- Founded: 11 October 1927; 98 years ago
- Headquarters: Tula, Russia
- Area served: Worldwide
- Products: Microphones; Headphones; Communication headsets; Body Armour
- Parent: Rostec
- Subsidiaries: OKB Oktava
- Website: oktavatula.ru

Oktava (Октава) is a Russian microphone manufacturer, which is part of Ruselectronics holding. It produces a variety of microphones for professional audio and general use. Oktava sells most of its products to the United States and Europe.

== History ==
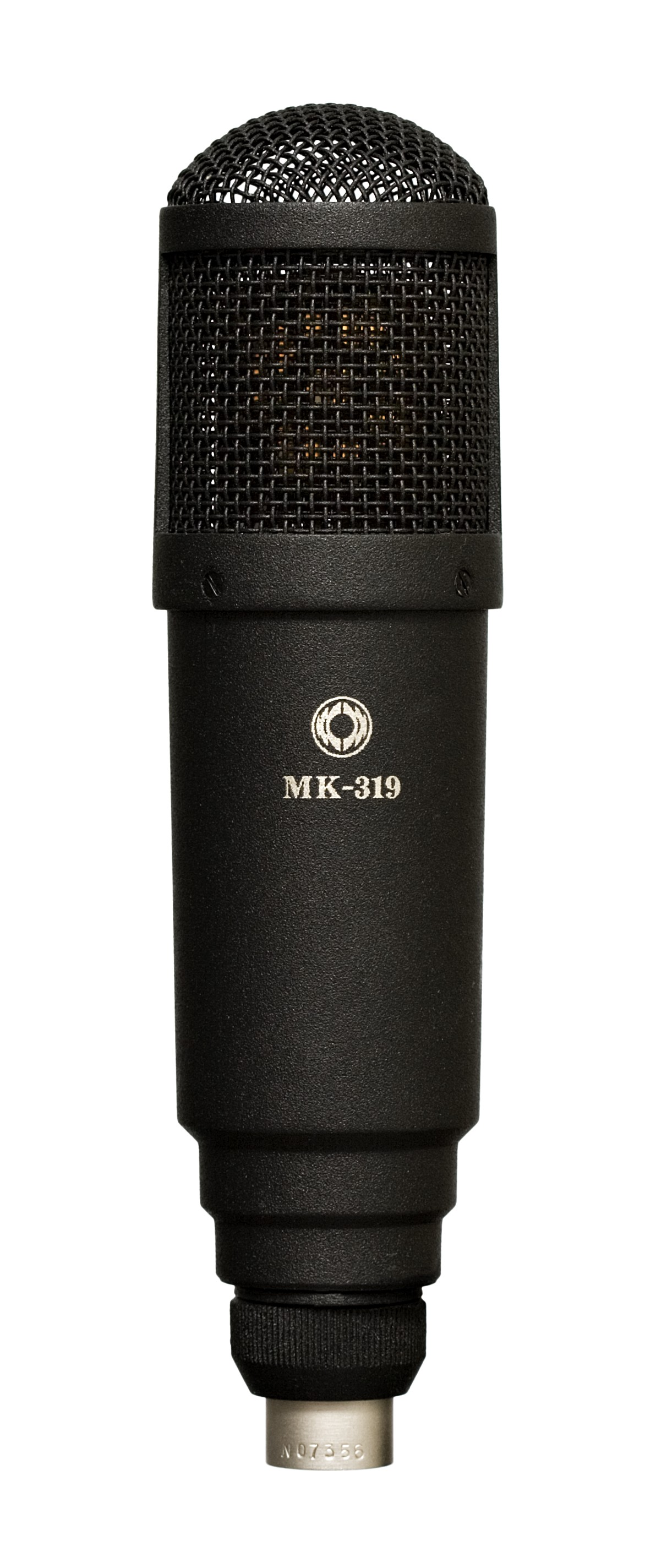
Oktava319

In June 1927, the electronics plant that became Oktava opened in Tula, producing radio components, and in four years grew from a local workshop into a large plant supplying microphones across the Soviet Union, attached to the Ministry of Postal Services.

Around 1932, the plant focused on the production of acoustical-electrical transducers, microphones and loudspeakers, and their first prototype tuned radio frequency receiver was produced that year. In 1934 the plant designed and manufactured a 30-watt dynamic loudspeaker, and the first batch of 100 was installed in Moscow squares. A 10-watt horn loudspeaker followed the next year, which would remain in production until 1945. 1936 saw the release of a dynamic microphone and the T35 radio receiver. The T37 radio receiver, released two years later, won second prize at the 1938 Technology of Communication exhibition.

In October 1941 the plant evacuated to Perm, but technicians and engineers were able to return early the following year to reconstruct the plant, which re-opened in May, producing mine-detectors, horn loudspeakers, and dynamic microphones. In 1943 the company developed a crystal loudspeaker and won first prize in a national competition. Another similar prize followed in 1945, and 169 staff members won medals in recognition of "excellent work". In 1946 the plant adopted the name Oktava (meaning "octave"), and in 1948 they began production of a 100-watt loudspeaker, the first batch of which were installed in Red Square, Moscow. In 1949 the plant began producing their carbon powder microphone and electromagnetic inset receiver, and also received their first export order, for the SDM microphone.

1951 saw the creation of a 25-watt radial moving-coil loudspeaker, for that year's Agricultural Exhibition in Moscow. From around 1954, the plant began to modernise and focus exclusively on telephone and microphone production. In 1957, Oktava small telephones and moving coil radial loudspeakers were displayed in the Russian section at the 1958 exhibition in Brussels. In 1961 Oktava introduced the D2 miniature telephone and began supplying dynamic microphones to the Kremlin. The plant also commenced a second round of modernisation and began producing electro-acoustic measuring instruments to test microphones and telephones.

From 1964 Oktava began implementing a "zero-defect" production system, and their TM-4 miniature telephone and ML-16 ribbon microphones received state quality marks. During this period Oktava was providing equipment for Kremlin meeting rooms and Ostankino Technical Center, the state's biggest TV studio. Oktava loudspeakers were installed in large arenas and squares around the country.

In the 1980s and early 1990s, Oktava began producing a number of new model microphones. Many of these were recognised at the National Exhibition of Industrial Achievements, including the TG-12 headphones and MD-82 microphone (bronze medal, 1983), MCE-9 microphone (bronze medal, 1984), TDS-2 telephone (bronze medal, 1985), and MD-86 microphone (2nd Diploma, 1986). In the same period, they also began producing hearing aids, with the Electronica and Y-03 hearing aids going into production in 1993. Oktava started exporting during the mid-1990s after modernizing the factory, and their microphones were well received in the west for their reasonable quality and competitive price.

Between 2009 and 2017 Oktava was integrated into the Ruselectronics-Group. Since 2017 Oktava is directly controlled by the governmental conglomerate Rostec, which makes 87% of their turnover in the military sector.

== See also ==
- List of microphone manufacturers
- Soyuz Microphones
