= 21st Century Girl (album) =

Studio album by Brazzaville
- Released: 2008
- Genre: Indie
- Length: 50:40

Brazzaville chronology
East L.A. Breeze (2006)	21st Century Girl (2008)

21st Century Girl is the sixth studio album of the indie group Brazzaville.

== Track listing ==
All tracks are written by David Arthur Brown, except where noted.

No.	Title	Length
1.	"LAX"	3:24
2.	"21st Century Girl"	4:15
3.	"Baltic Sea"	3:47
4.	"The Sun"	3:08
5.	"Leo"	2:33
6.	"Anabel"	3:11
7.	"The Clouds in Camarillo" (Brown, Mikhail Korneev, Ivan Korolev)	3:23
8.	"Aging Queens"	3:56
9.	"Hoover St."	3:48
10.	"Up All Night"	3:15
11.	"Baby Blue"	3:54
12.	"The Hills of Anatolia"	4:34
13.	"The Clouds in Camarillo (На вершине мира)" (featuring Minerva)	3:54
14.	"Aquamarine"	3:38

== The Clouds in Camarillo ==
"The Clouds in Camarillo (Вершина мира)"

Single by Brazzaville feat. "Minerva"

from the album 21st Century Girl
- Released: 2007
- Recorded: 2007
- Genre: Folk pop, Pop rock
- Length: 3:39
- Label: Calle Casanova Studio
- Songwriters: David Brown, Mikhail Korneev

Brazzaville feat. "Minerva" singles chronology
"Star Called Sun" (2006)	"The Clouds in Camarillo (Вершина мира)" (2007)	"Teenage Summer Days" (2009)

The Clouds in Camarillo is a name of the radio-single released by Brazzaville in 2007. The song was included to the album 21st Century Girl.

=== The Plot and Minerva's addition ===
Camarillo is a city in California, United States. Located nearby was Camarillo State Mental Hospital, a psychiatric facility that treated patients with mental illnesses. The mother of Brazzaville frontman David Brown was a patient at the hospital. The song's lyrics are based on a poetic interpretation of one of her letters.

Original song, "Top of the World" was written by Mikhail Galper (ex Korneev) an Ivan Korolyov in 2006. David Arthur Brown heard this song in summer of 2007 during his visit in Moscow for Siberian tour. He did his remake version in August, and in September, Mikhail made a suggestion to record his voice.

=== Music video ===
In 2007 for the song was filmed video, which was loaded on YouTube by Minerva's profile. The video shows David Brown and Mikhail Korneev in the city of Camarillo dressed in white clothes for the mentally ill. The most attention is paid to the woman, which is dancing on the road and playing with teddy baby in a pram. Also the singers are shown closed in a cage with the woman. At the end of the video the woman walks into the sea and disappears into it.

The video was shown on popular TV Channels of United States, Russia and Ukrainian channel M1.

== Personnel ==
- Richie Alvarez – keyboards
- Paco Jordi – guitars, backing vocals
- Brady Lynch – bass
- David Brown – synthesizer, guitar, keyboards, tambourine, vocals, shaker, audio production, cover photo
- Janet Brown – photography
- Narcis Coromina – saxophone
- Maria Pi Sunier De Gispert – vocals
- Juan Fortea – electric guitar, vocals
- Rick Hake – synthesizer
- Ivan Knight – bongos, drums, shaker, hi hat
- Mikhail Korneev – vocals
- Erik Radloff – drums
- Todd Richard – synthesizer, guitar, audio production, hammond B3
- Marina Sala – accordion, vocals
- Natauko Sugao – trumpet
- Naomi Wedman – violin
