= Rouge on Pockmarked Cheeks =

Rouge On Pockmarked Cheeks

Studio album by Brazzaville
- Released: May 7, 2002
- Genre: Bossa nova, Indie pop
- Length: 62:24
- Label: South China Sea
- Producer: Tony Hoffer, Nigel Godrich

Brazzaville chronology
Somnambulista (2000)	Rouge On Pockmarked Cheeks (2002)	Welcome to... Brazzaville (2004)

Professional ratings
Review scores
Source	Rating
LA Weekly	link
SF Weekly	link

Rouge on Pockmarked Cheeks is the third album by Brazzaville. The album which was produced by Nigel Godrich was released in 2002.

== Track listing ==
1. "Motel Room" – 4:56
2. "Samurai" – 6:25
3. "Queenie" – 4:28
4. "1980" – 4:50
5. "Rainy Night" – 3:12
6. "Genoa" – 6:29
7. "Trona" – 4:30
8. "Xanax and Three Hours of TV" – 3:17
9. "High Life" – 3:26
10. "N. Koreatown" – 6:20
11. "Late Night Lullaby" – 14:34
