= Somnambulista =

Studio album by Brazzaville
- Released: 2001
- Genre: Indie pop, chamber pop, bossa nova
- Label: South China Sea

Brazzaville chronology
2002 (1998)	Somnambulista (2001)	Rouge on Pockmarked Cheeks (2002)

Professional ratings
Review scores
Source	Rating
AllMusic	4/5 stars
The Encyclopedia of Popular Music	4/5 stars

Somnambulista is the second album by Brazzaville, released in 2001.

== Critical reception ==
AllMusic wrote that "while the music is reassuring and enveloping like the lapping waves of a tropical beach, listen closely to the lyrics lying just under the surface of the saxophone-led music and you hear sad, if poetic, tales of broken lives." Exclaim! thought that "as the album progresses, we phase in and out of hazy vibes, jazzy licks and pop tinged varieties with a fluidity that is practically shocking."

== Track listing ==
1. "Air Mail"
2. "Foreign Disaster Days"
3. "Sandman"
4. "Boeing"
5. "Casa Batllo"
6. "Lazy, Flawed and Hopeless"
7. "Jane"
8. "Super Gizi"
9. "4 Am Osaka"
10. "Old Man Dub"
11. "3rd and Broadway"
