= East L.A. Breeze =

Studio album by Brazzaville
- Released: 12 June 2006
- Recorded: 2006
- Studio: L.A. River Shack, Los Angeles, CA; South China Sea Studios, Barcelona, Spain; The L.A. River Shack, Los Angeles, CA
- Genre: Indie pop, bossa nova, indie rock
- Length: 39:37
- Label: Zakat (Soyuz Records)

Brazzaville chronology
Hastings Street (2004)	East L.A. Breeze (2006)	21st Century Girl (2008)

Professional ratings
Review scores
Source	Rating
AllMusic	3.5/5 stars

East L.A. Breeze is the fifth studio album of the indie group Brazzaville. For the first time this CD was released by a Soyuz Records sub-label Zakat in 2006. Until released by some Western record label, the album's been available only in CIS.

All songs are written by David Arthur Brown, except "Star Called Sun" which features music by Viktor Tsoi (Виктор Цой), the leader of the Soviet rock band Kino (Кино).

== International availability ==
On October 9, 2006 East L.A. Breeze was released in Spain on South China Sea / Discmedi. For North America, was released by Vendlus Records in late 2006.

== Packaging ==
In July 2006, the album was reissued by Zakat/Soyuz in a digipack. This version has two songs more ("Lena", "Lazy Boy") and a "Star Called Sun" promotional video.

In Soyuz shops it is available at the same price as the regular album, but the quantity of Digipaks is smaller (roughly speaking, one Digipak by eight regular releases).

== Track listing ==
=== Original Russian edition ===
1. "Peach Tree" – 2:39
2. "Star Called Sun" – 3:41
3. "East L.A. Breeze" – 3:18
4. "Mr. Suicide" – 3:19
5. "1983" – 3:51
6. "Jesse James" – 3:48
7. "Madalena" – 3:44
8. "Bosphorus" – 3:18
9. "Ugly Babylon" – 3:04
10. "Taksim" – 3:07
11. "Blue Candles" – 3:29
12. "Morning Light" – 4:19

=== International release ===
All tracks by David Arthur Brown except where noted.

1. "Peach Tree" – 2:41
2. "Star Called Sun" (Brown, Viktor Tsoi) – 3:43
3. "East L.A. Breeze" – 3:20
4. "Mr. Suicide" – 3:21
5. "1983" – 3:53
6. "Jesse James" – 3:50
7. "Madalena" – 3:46
8. "Bosphorus" – 3:20
9. "Ugly Babylon" – 3:06
10. "Taksim" – 3:09
11. "Blue Candles" – 3:31
12. "Morning Light" – 4:23
13. "Lena" [bonus track] – 3:48
14. "Lazy Boy" [bonus track] – 2:27
15. "Star Called Sun" Video

== Personnel ==
- Richie Alvarez – piano
- Jeroen Blankert – cover photo
- David Brown – guitar, vocals
- Luna Cohen – vocals
- Kenny Lyon – guitar
- Cristian Vogel – mastering
