= Yuri Aizenshpis =

Russian music manager and producer

- Born: Yuri Shmilevich Aizenshpis; July 15, 1945; Chelyabinsk
- Died: September 20, 2005 (aged 60); Moscow
- Occupation: producer
- Years active: 1965–2005
- Spouse: Yelena Kovrigina

Yuri Shmilevich Aizenshpis (Russian: Ю́рий Шми́льевич Айзеншпи́с; July 15, 1945, in Chelyabinsk, Soviet Union – September 20, 2005, in Moscow, Russia) was a Russian music manager and producer.

== Biography ==
He graduated from the Moscow State University of Economics, Statistics, and Informatics (1968).

He sold imported (and expensive) Beatles and Rolling Stones records, and had a collection of albums by Western rock musicians, imported clothing, fur products, and musical equipment.

On January 7, 1970, Aizenshpis was arrested. As a result of a search, 15,585 rubles was confiscated, as well as his flat and 7,675 dollars. He was convicted on 88 charges (infringement of rules on currency transactions). He was released from prison in 1988 after serving 18 years.

Starting December 1989, shortly before the death of Viktor Tsoi in 1990, he was the director and producer of the group Kino.

In 1990, using borrowed funds, he released The Black Album (the last work of the Kino group), one of the first to break the state monopoly on the release of records.

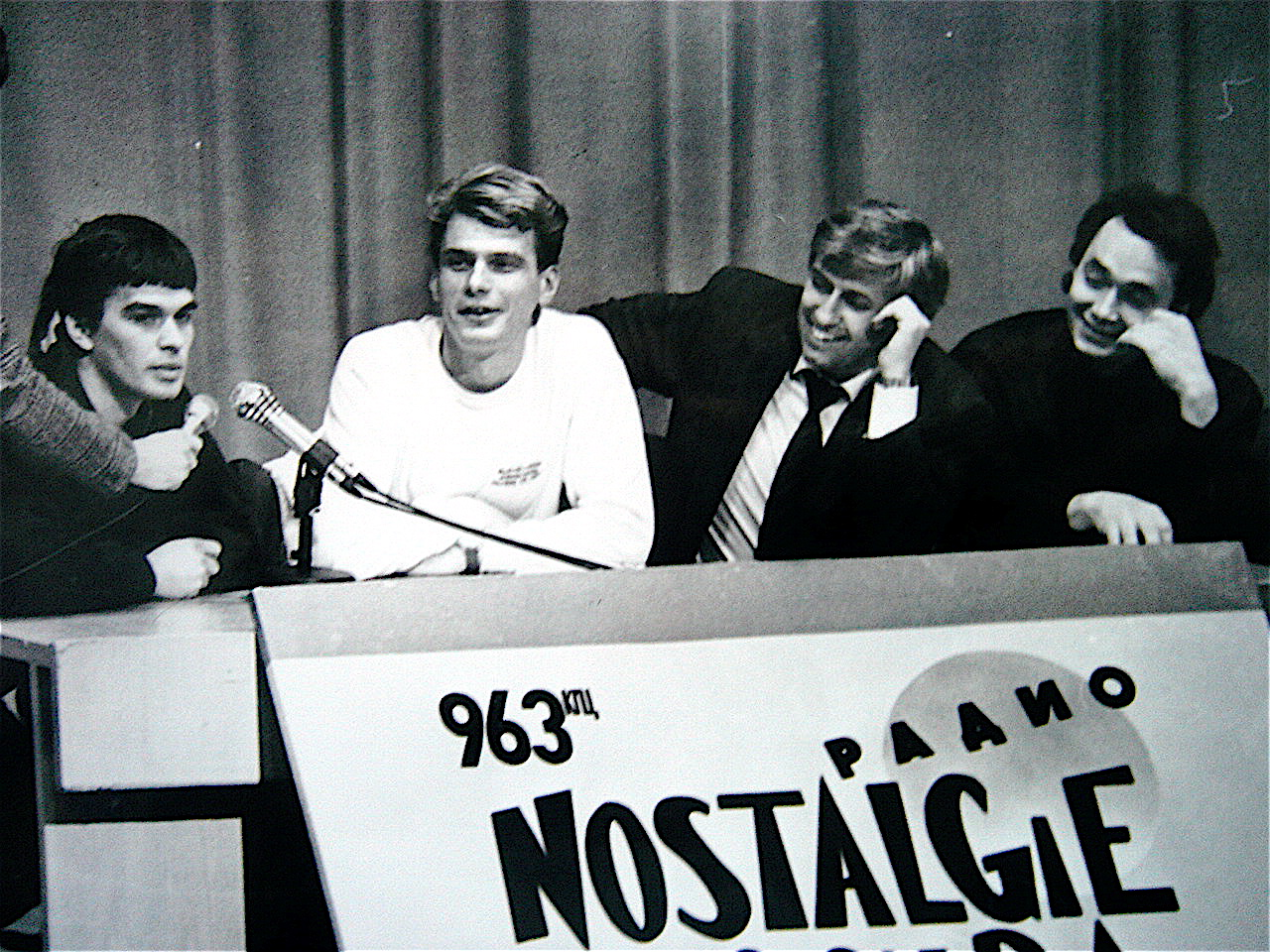
Presentation of The Black Album in Moscow on January 12, 1991 (Yuri Kasparyan, Yevgeny Dodolev, Yuri Aizenshpis, Igor Tikhomirov)

Beginning in 1991, he produced for the groups Technology, Moralny codex, and Dynamite, and singers Linda, Vlad Stashevsky, Nikita, and Sasha Gradiva. He was the winner of the Russian national music award Ovation for Best Producer in 1992 and 1995). He was also the first producer for Dima Bilan. From 2001, until his death, he was the company Media Star's CEO.

Shortly before his death, Eisenshpis starred in the film "Day Watch", playing himself. He felt unwell on the set, but refused to be hospitalized, although he eventually had to take a vacation.

Aizenshpis died on September 20, 2005, at about 20:00 from myocardial infarction in the City Clinical Hospital No. 20.
