= Zvezda po imeni Solntse =

Studio album by Kino
- Released: 29 August 1989
- Recorded: December 1988–January 1989
- Genres: Gothic rock; alternative rock; post-punk; new wave
- Length: 39:05
- Labels: independent release on magnitizdat (1989); Moroz Records (1993 re-release); Maschina Records (2019 re-release)
- Producers: Yuri Belishkin, Kino

Kino chronology
Posledniy geroy (1989)	Zvezda po imeni Solntse (1989)	Chornyy al'bom (1990)

Moroz Records re-release
- 1993 re-release

Professional ratings
Review scores
Source	Rating
Allmusic	4/5 stars

Zvezda po imeni Solntse (Russian: Звезда по имени Солнце, lit. 'A star called the Sun') is the sixth studio album by the Soviet rock band Kino, released on August 29, 1989. The album was the last album released before lead vocalist Viktor Tsoi's death.

== Recording history ==
The recording of the draft version of the album took place at Georgy Guryanov, where the group's home studio was located. The recording was made at the same port studio where the previous album was made. The musicians decided to record the final version in a professional studio. For this, the director of the group, Yuri Belishkin, rented the studio of the singer Valery Leontiev in Moscow, where in December 1988 - January 1989 the final version of the album was recorded.

== Release history ==
The album was first released in 1989 on cassette and reel-to-reel, sold at the band's concerts. It did not receive a proper release until 1993, when Moroz Records released it on vinyl. The 1993 re-release cover art depicts a solar eclipse. In 1995, the album was released in Germany on CD. The album received its first Russian CD release in 1996.

In 2019, the original album was remastered and reissued by Maschina Records. Yuri Kasparyan, Igor Tikhomirov, and Viktor Tsoi's son, Alexander, were involved in the production and approval process.

== Music style ==
The Album is described as post-punk, new wave and alternative rock with elements of indie rock. The main song, "Zvezda po imeni Solntse", is a mix of all of these styles. Every composition on Zvezda po imeni Solntse represents a different genre: "Pesnya bez Slov" ― synth rock; "Neveselaya Pesnya" ― folk metal; "Skazka" ― gothic rock; "Mesto dlya Shaga Vperyod" ― funk; "Pachka sigaret" ― space rock; "Stuk" ― hard rock and alternative metal; "Pechal" ― jangle pop; "April" ― folk rock.

== Track listing ==
Thematically, it is significantly different - the lyrics tell about personal struggles and are filled with reflections on the meaning of life and death.

All tracks are written by Viktor Tsoi.

No.	Title	Translation	Length
1.	"Pesnya bez slov" (Russian: «Песня без слов»)	"Song Without Words"	5:07
2.	"Zvezda po imeni Solntse" (Russian: «Звезда по имени Солнце»)	"A star called the Sun"	3:46
3.	"Nevesolaya pesnya" (Russian: «Невесёлая песня»)	"Unhappy Song"	4:18
4.	"Skazka" (Russian: «Сказка»)	"Tale"	6:00
5.	"Mesto dlya shaga vperod" (Russian: «Место для шага вперёд»)	"Space for a Step Forward"	3:40
6.	"Pachka sigaret" (Russian: «Пачка сигарет»)	"Pack of Cigarettes"	4:29
7.	"Stuk" (Russian: «Стук»)	"Knock"	3:51
8.	"Pechal'" (Russian: «Печаль»)	"Sadness"	5:33
9.	"Aprel" (Russian: «Апрель»)	"April"	4:41
Total length:			41:24

== Personnel ==
- Viktor Tsoi – Vocals, Guitar
- Yuri Kasparyan – Lead Guitar
- Igor Tikhomirov – Bass Guitar
- Georgiy Guryanov – drum machine Yamaha RX-5
