= David Arthur Brown =

American singer-songwriter (born 1967)

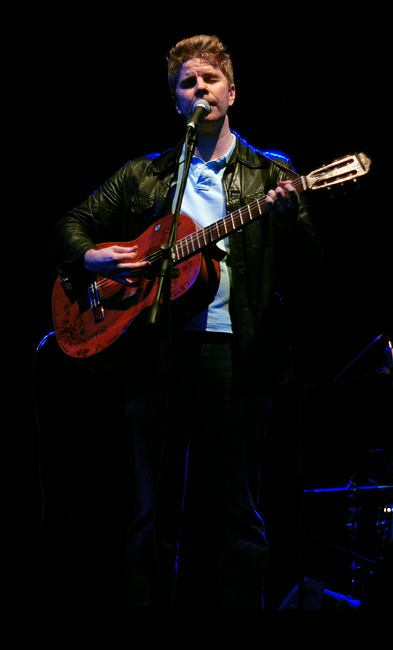
- David Arthur Brown, 2010
- Born: June 19, 1967 (age 59); Los Angeles, California, US
- Website: agingdandy.com

David Arthur Brown is an American musician and the lead vocalist and principal songwriter for the US band Brazzaville.

== Life and career ==
David Arthur Brown was born in Los Angeles, California, on June 19, 1967. He was a runaway who later became interested in low budget travel and poetry. His early years were spent largely in the Koreatown district of Los Angeles. Beginning in his late teens he traveled extensively through Asia, South America, and Europe. Along the way he learned to play the saxophone which he played in Beck's band from 1997 through 2000. In Barcelona, during one of Beck's European tours he bought a guitar and began writing songs and singing. From 1997 through 2017, he wrote and recorded 11 full-length albums with his band Brazzaville and toured extensively throughout the world.

== Early years ==
David Arthur Brown was born in Los Angeles in 1967 to Shulamit Soltes and Robert Wellington Brown. His early years were spent in foster care and then later with his paternal grandmother, Dorothy Ida Brown, a poet who greatly influenced Brown both creatively and spiritually. Brown's teenage years were spent primarily in the Koreatown area of Los Angeles as well as brief stints in Hollywood and Downtown Los Angeles. He began writing poetry at the age of 16 giving readings at local venues.

== Brazzaville ==
From 1997 to 2000, Brown toured with Beck as his saxophone player. While on tour, he was exposed to many different bands. He met and became friends with Mark Sandman of Morphine and began to develop an interest in other genres of music than jazz.

He decided to try writing lyrics and singing. He contacted his friend Kenny Lyon, a guitar and bass player and suggested they form a band. Finding a suitable name proved difficult. It was when Brown was reading a story in the Los Angeles Times about the civil war in Congo, particularly about events unfolding in the city of Brazzaville, that he finally came up with the name.

Much of Brazzaville's early music reflects Brown's fascination with shipping, Asia, low budget travel, and misfits. At the age of 11, he spent many days at work with his father, who worked as a trucker hauling shipping containers from the ports in San Pedro and Long Beach to the Union Pacific and Southern Pacific train yards. That period left a lasting impression on Brown and his songwriting and can be heard on tracks like Deng Xiaoping, Shams, and Love Sky.

Over the next 20 years, Brown wrote and released 11 albums with Brazzaville. In 2003, Brown moved to Spain.

== Personal life ==
Brown previously resided in Barcelona in Spain, with his wife and two children.

In 2003, Brown first visited Russia on the invitation of local musicians, and quickly became fascinated by the country. In 2013, Brown co-founded Soyuz Microphones alongside entrepreneur Pavel Bazdyrev, a manufacturer of premium handmade microphones based in Tula. Brown has lived in Saint Petersburg since 2023, where he has a Russian wife, and continues his musical career as well as his business.

== Discography ==
=== Albums ===
- 2002 (South China Sea Music, 1998)
- Somnambulista (South China Sea Music, 2000)
- Rouge On Pockmarked Cheeks (South China Sea Music, 2002)
- Hastings Street (Zakat, 2004)
- Welcome to... Brazzaville (Web of Mimicry, 2004), (Zakat, 2005)— greatest hits vol.1
- East L.A. Breeze (Zakat, 2006)
- 21st Century Girl (South China Sea Music, 2008)
- Teenage Summer Days (South China Sea Music, 2009)
- Brazzaville in Istanbul (South China Sea Music, 2010)
- Welcome to Brazzaville 2 (South China Sea Music, 2010) greatest hits vol.2
- Jetlag Poetry (South China Sea Music, 2011)
- Morro Bay (South China Sea Music, 2013)
- Oceans of Ganymede (South China Sea Music, 2016)
