= Brazzaville (band) =

American indie pop band

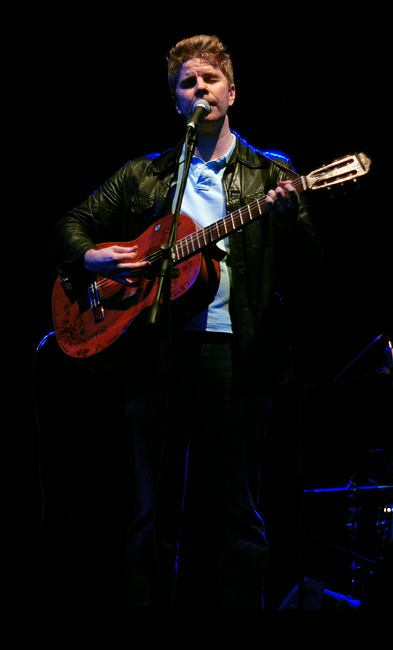
- David Brown

Background information
- Origin: Los Angeles, California, USA
- Genres: Indie pop, bossa nova, chamber pop
- Years active: 1998–present
- Labels: South China Sea
- Members: David Brown; Richie Alvarez; Paco Jordi; Brady Lynch; Ivan Knight
- Past members: Joel Virgel Vierset; David Ralicke; Kenny Lyon; Mike Bolger; Joe Zimmerman; L. Cedeño
- Website: http://www.brazzavilleband.com

Brazzaville is an American indie pop band founded in 1997 by David Brown. It was named after Brazzaville, the capital of the Republic of the Congo. Brown was at one time Beck's saxophonist and took part in recording of Odelay and Midnite Vultures.

On May 7, 2009, David Brown officially announced the dissolution of the band, stating that he would henceforth be recording and releasing music under the name David Arthur Brown, albeit with "many of the wonderful musicians who have contributed to Brazzaville records." However, June 23, 2009, David once again announced that the band will continue to exist in parallel with a solo career.

== Members ==
- David Arthur Brown: songwriter, vocals, guitar.
- Richie Alvarez: keyboards.
- Ramon Aragall: drums.
- Mike Bolger: trumpet, piano, accordion.
- Rob Gibiaqui: drums.
- Smokey Hormel: guitar.
- Paco Jordi: guitars, backing vocals.
- Feryin Kaya: bass.
- Ivan Knight: drums.
- Brady Lynch: bass.
- Kenny Lyon: guitar, ukulele, melodica, backing vocals.
- Maria Pi-Sunyer de Gispert: vocals.
- David Ralicke: saxophone, trombone.
- Dima Shvetsov: drums.
- Joel Virgel: drums, percussion, backing vocals.
- Oleg Zaytseff: keyboards.
- Joe Zimmerman: bass, backing vocals.

== Discography ==
=== Albums ===
- 2002 (South China Sea, 1998)
- Somnambulista (South China Sea, 2000)
- Rouge On Pockmarked Cheeks (South China Sea, 2002)
- Hastings Street (Zakat, 2004)
- East L.A. Breeze (Zakat, 2006), (Vendlus Records, 2006)
- 21st Century Girl (Zakat, 2008), (Vendlus Records, 2008)
- Brazzaville in Istanbul (Doublemoon Records, 2009) — live album
- Jetlag Poetry (Zakat, 2011)
- Morro Bay (2013)
- The Oceans of Ganymede (2016)
- Dream Sea (2018)
- Sheila's Dream (2020)

=== Compilations ===
- Welcome to... Brazzaville (Web of Mimicry, 2004), (Zakat, 2005)
- Welcome to Brazzaville II (Zakat, 2012)
- Lazy Days in Eixample (2024)

=== Radio singles ===
- Star Called Sun (Viktor Tsoi cover, 2006)
- The Clouds in Camarillo (2007)
- Teenage Summer Days (Alexin cover, 2009)

=== Music videos ===
- Foreign Disaster Days (2005)
- Jesse James (2006)
- Star Called Sun (2006)
- Peach Tree (2006)
- Bosphorus (2006)
- The Clouds in Camarillo feat. Minerva (Russian: Вершина мира) (2007)
- Girl From Vladivostok (Devushka From Vladivostok) (2009)
- Anabel 2 (2011)
- Rather Stay Home (2011)
- Boeing (2012)
- Barcelona (2012)
