= Yamaha RX-5 =

Drum machine

- Manufacturer: Yamaha
- Dates: 1986
- Price: $1,195

Technical specifications
- Polyphony: 16 voices
- LFO: 1 modulator
- Synthesis type: PCM rompler
- Storage memory: 100 Patterns, 20 Songs, 3 Chains. Accepts RAM4 to store sequence & voice data; ROM/RAM cartridge port
- Effects: Reverse, Damp, Pitch Bend, Accent

Input/output
- Keyboard: 24 Pads (no velocity)
- External control: MIDI In/Out/Thru; Clock In/Out

The Yamaha RX-5 is a programmable digital sample-based drum machine built by Yamaha in 1986. With the extensibility of sample-sounds via ROM cartridges labeled Waveform Data Cartridge, and the multiple voice-parameters (including chromatic pitch and envelope) controlled for each note, RX-5 offered the ability to create relatively simple sample-based music tracks all in one device, as on the groove machines.

== Features ==
=== Sound and outputs ===
The RX-5 has 24 built-in digitally sampled drum sounds and another 28 on the "RX5 ROM" cartridge that was included with every RX-5. The sounds include bass drum, snare drum, rimshot, toms, hi hat, cymbal (ride or crash), hand clap, tambourine, cowbell, and shaker. The included cartridge contains variation of drums, timpani and Latin percussions, additional percussions (synth percussions and marimba), sound effects (glass clash and gunshot), chromatic instruments (electric bass, synth-orchestra hit, synth-clavi, and human voices). The RX-5 has 12 individual outputs for each vertical drum pad pair. Each pair has a fixed set of sounds at its disposal, for example 6 bass drum samples at the first two buttons. There is a workaround to have other sounds in each location. When you customise a sound to one of the 10 copied sounds presets, they become available on all pads.

The RX-5 also features: chromatic pitch to program the music tracks consists of melody-bass-chord parts as on the groove machines, pitch bend, accent and individual level control, envelope controls (consists of: attack, decay, decay2 and release), and sampling effects including reverse and damp (looping).

== Sequencer ==
The sequencer section can record up to 100 patterns with time signatures ranging from 01/32 to 99/2 in either Real Time or Step Time record modes with lengths of 1-99 bars. Real Time recorded patterns can be quantized to the nearest 1/2 to 1/48 note. Patterns can be arranged in up to 20 songs.

== Storage ==
The RX-5 has a RAM/ROM cartridge slot for storing custom edited sounds and loading in new sounds as well. The RX-5 was shipped by Yamaha with one additional cartridge of sounds—the "RX5 ROM". Three additional Waveform ROM Cartridges were made to suit various genres: WRC-02 (Jazz & Fusion), WRC-03 (Heavy Metal), and WRC-04 (Effects). There were also a few third-party cartridges made, containing TR-808 and TR-909 samples, but they are rather rare. Various projects to create compatible USB connected cartridges are in progress. Additionally, a custom ROM cart utilizing flash memory and a Teensy microcontroller, the RX5USB is available and allows the loading of custom sounds to the RX-5.

== Bibliography ==
- RX5 Owner's Manual (online preview). Yamaha Corporation.
  also available on Yamaha official site:
  - Yamaha RX5 Digital Rhythm Programmer - Owner's Manual (scanned PDF). Yamaha Corporation. 1987.
