= Network for the Promotion of Asian Cinema =

Pan-Asian film cultural organization

NETPAC Award
- Description: Award presented at international film festivals to promote Asian cinema and discover new talent
- Country: International
- Presented by: Network for the Promotion of Asian Cinema
- Website: https://www.netpacasia.org/

The Network for the Promotion of Asian Cinema (NETPAC) is a worldwide organization of 29 member countries. It was created as the result of a conference on Asian cinema organized by Cinemaya, the Asian Film Quarterly, in New Delhi in 1990 at the instance and with the support of UNESCO, Paris.

Headquartered in Singapore, the NETPAC is a pan-Asian film cultural organization involving critics, filmmakers, festival organizers and curators, distributors and exhibitors, as well as film educators. It is considered a leading authority on Asian cinema.

== Organizational scope and activities ==
Since 1990, it has programmed Asian sections of international film festivals, introduced filmmakers from Asia to the world, brought out a compendium of the existing film infrastructure in different Asian countries, organized seminars and conferences and instituted an award for the Best Asian Film at festivals like Singapore, Busan, Jeonju, Kerala, Kazakhstan and Osian's Cinefan among those in Asia; Berlin, Locarno, Karlovy Vary, Rotterdam, Vesoul and others in Europe; at Brisbane in Australia; Hawaii in the US; Antalya in Turkey and Black Nights in Estonia.

The NETPAC Award is given at select international film festivals to promote Asian cinema by spotlighting exceptional films and discovering new talents. Among filmmakers who have won this award more than twice are Sri Lanka's Prasanna Vithanage (5 times); Kazakhstan's Adilkhan Yerzhanov (4 times); China's Wang Xiaoshuai (thrice) and Hao Jie (thrice); the Philippines' Lav Diaz (thrice) and Brillante Mendoza (thrice); Malaysia's Ho Yuhang (thrice); and South Korea's Kim Ki-duk (thrice).

== NETPAC Award winners ==
=== 1993 ===
- Singapore International Film Festival
  - Winner The Peach Blossom Land (Stan Lai, Taiwan)

=== 1994 ===
- Berlin International Film Festival
  - Winner All Under the Moon (Yoichi Sai, Japan)
  - Special Mention Shackles (Nansalmaagin Uranchimeg, Mongolia)
- Singapore International Film Festival
  - Winner The Servile (Adoor Gopalakrishnan, India)

=== 1995 ===
- Berlin International Film Festival
  - Winner Undo (Shunji Iwai, Japan)
  - Winner Elephant Song (Go Riju, Japan)
- International Film Festival Rotterdam
  - Winner The Servile (Adoor Gopalakrishnan, India)
- Singapore International Film Festival
  - Winner A Borrowed Life (Wu Nien-jen, Taiwan)
  - Special Mention Mee Pok Man (Eric Khoo, Singapore)

=== 1996 ===
- Berlin International Film Festival
  - Winner ...And the Moon Dances (Garin Nugroho, Indonesia)
  - Special Mention Heaven-6-Box (Hiroyuki Oki, Japan)
- Busan International Film Festival
  - Winner Three Friends (Yim Soon-rye, South Korea)
- International Film Festival Rotterdam
  - Winner Heartbreak Island (Hsu Hsiao-ming, Taiwan)
  - Winner Nostalgia for Home Country (Nhat Minh Dang, Vietnam)
- Singapore International Film Festival
  - Winner Good Men, Good Women (Hou Hsiao-hsien, Taiwan)
  - Special Mention It's a Long Way to the Sea (Jahnu Barua, North India)

=== 1997 ===
- Amiens International Film Festival
  - Winner Somersault in a Coffin (Derviş Zaim, Turkey)
- Berlin International Film Festival
  - Winner Focus (Satoshi Izaka, Japan)
- Busan International Film Festival
  - Winner Bad Movie (Jang Sun-woo, South Korea)
- International Film Festival Rotterdam
  - Winner 2 Duo (Nobuhiro Suwa, Japan)
- Singapore International Film Festival
  - Winner 12 Storeys (Eric Khoo, Singapore)
  - Special Mention The Long Journey (Lê Hoàng, Vietnam)

=== 1998 ===
- Amiens International Film Festival
  - Winner Walls Within (Prasanna Vithanage, Sri Lanka)
- Berlin International Film Festival
  - Winner The Pickpocket (Jia Zhangke, China)
- Busan International Film Festival
  - Winner The Power of Kangwon Province (Hong Sang-soo, South Korea)
  - Special Mention A Killing Story (Yeo Kyun-Dong, South Korea)
- International Film Festival Rotterdam
  - Winner Dance of the Wind (Rajan Khosa, India)
  - Special Mention Green Fish (Lee Chang-dong, South Korea)
- Singapore International Film Festival
  - Winner In the Navel of the Sea (Marilou Diaz-Abaya, the Philippines)
  - Special Mention Hold You Tight (Stanley Kwan, Hong Kong)
- Taiwan International Documentary Festival
  - Winner Out for Love...Be Back Shortly (Dan Katzir, Israel)
  - Special Mention Nadya's Village (Seiichi Motohashi, Japan)

=== 1999 ===
- Amiens International Film Festival
  - Winner Death On A Full Moon Day (Prasanna Vithanage, Sri Lanka)
- Berlin International Film Festival
  - Winner 2H (Ying Li, China)
  - Winner Dil Se.. (Mani Ratnam, India)
- Busan International Film Festival
  - Winner The Bird Who Stops in the Air (Jeon Soo-il, South Korea)
  - Special Mention The Uprising (Park Kwang-Su, South Korea)
- Cinemanila International Film Festival
  - Winner Birth of A Butterfly (Mojtaba Raei, Iran)
  - Special Mention Fetch A Pail of Water (Jeffrey Jeturian, the Philippines)
- Singapore International Film Festival
  - Winner Connection by Fate (Wan Ren, Taiwan)
  - Special Mention Beshkempir (Aktan Abdykalykov, Kyrgyzstan)
  - Special Mention The Power of the Kangwon-du Province (Hong Sang-soo, South Korea)
- International Film Festival Rotterdam
  - Winner The Servant's Shirt (Mani Kaul, North India)
- Yamagata International Documentary Film Festival
  - Winner Shiro the White (Katsuyuki Hirano, Japan)
  - Special Mention Annyong-Kimchi (Tetsuaki Matsue, Japan)
  - Special Mention I Love (080) (Yang Li-chou, Taiwan)

=== 2000 ===
- Amiens International Film Festival
  - Winner The Orphan of Anyang (Wang Chao, China)
- Berlin International Film Festival
  - Winner The Lady of the House (Rituparno Ghosh, India)
  - Winner Nabbie's Love (Yuji Nakae, Japan)
  - Special Mention Making Sun-Dried Red Peppers (Jang Hee-Sun, South Korea)
- Busan International Film Festival
  - Winner Chunhyang (Im Kwon-taek, South Korea)
- Dhaka International Film Festival
  - Winner Padadaya (Linton Semage, Sri Lanka)
  - Winner Saroja (Somaratne Dissanayake, Sri Lanka)
- Hawaii International Film Festival
  - Winner Breaking the Silence (Zhou Sun, China)
  - Special Mention Spinning Gasing (Teck Tan, Malaysia)
- International Film Festival Rotterdam
  - Winner Nang Nak (Nonzee Nimibutr, Thailand)
  - Winner Paper (Ding Jiancheng, China)
- Karlovy Vary International Film Festival
  - Winner Yi Yi (Edward Yang, Taiwan)
  - Special Mention Peppermint Candy (Lee Chang-dong, South Korea)
- Singapore International Film Festival
  - Winner Darkness and Light (Chang Tso-chi, Taiwan)
  - Winner So Close to Paradise (Wang Xiaoshuai, China)
- Taiwan International Documentary Festival
  - Winner Alone (Dmitry Kabakov, Russia)
  - Special Mention Happy Birthday, Mr. Mograbi (Avi Mograbi, Israel)
  - Special Mention The Lost Kingdom (Lee Hsiang-Hsiu, Taiwan)
- Venice Film Festival
  - Winner Platform (Jia Zhangke, China)
  - Special Mention The Isle (Kim Ki-duk, South Korea)

=== 2001 ===
- Berlin International Film Festival
  - Winner Smell of Camphor, Fragrance of Jasmine (Bahman Farmanara, Iran)
  - Special Mention Wharf of Widows (Trong Ninh Luu, Vietnam)
- Brisbane International Film Festival
  - Winner What Time Is It There? (Tsai Ming-liang, Taiwan)
  - Special Mention The Wrestlers (Buddhadeb Dasgupta, India)
- Busan International Film Festival
  - Winner Take Care of My Cat (Jeong Jae-eun, South Korea)
  - Special Mention Bad Guy (Kim Ki-duk, South Korea)
  - Special Mention Waikiki Brothers (Yim Soon-rye, South Korea)
- Cinefan Asian Film Festival
  - Winner Demons (Mario O'Hara, the Philippines)
- Cinemanila International Film Festival
  - Winner Batang West Side (Lav Diaz, the Philippines)
- Fajr International Film Festival
  - Winner Going By (Iraj Karimi, Iran)
- Hawaii International Film Festival
  - Winner Devils on the Doorstep (Jiang Wen, China)
  - Special Mention The Day Toshi was Born (Hikaru Yoshikawa, Japan)
- International Film Festival Rotterdam
  - Winner Daughters of the Sun (Maryam Shahriar, Iran)
  - Special Mention The House of Guavas (Dang Nhat Minh, Vietnam)
- Jakarta International Film Festival
  - Winner – Short Film The Greatest Day Dreamer (Liew Wai Ming, Singapore)
  - Special Mention Wired (Chung Fa Yang, Taiwan)
- Karlovy Vary International Film Festival
  - Winner Under the Skin of the City (Rakhshan Bani-Etemad, Iran)
  - Special Mention Firefly Dreams (John Williams, Japan)
- Singapore International Film Festival
  - Winner A Poet (Garin Nugroho, Indonesia)
  - Special Mention This is My Moon (Asoka Handagama, Sri Lanka)
- Venice Film Festival
  - Winner Secret Ballot (Babak Payami, Iran)
  - Winner Quitting (Zhang Yang, China)
- Yamagata International Documentary Film Festival
  - Winner My Migrant Soul (Yasmine Kabir, Bangladesh)
  - Special Mention Pansy & Ivy (Kye Un-kyoung, South Korea)
  - Special Mention Mysterious Object at Noon (Apichatpong Weerasethakul, Thailand)

=== 2002 ===
- Berlin International Film Festival
  - Winner Chen Mo and Meiting (Liu Hao, China)
  - Special Mention Fish and Elephant (Li Yu, China)
- Brisbane International Film Festival
  - Winner Seafood (Zhu Wen, China)
  - Special Mention Whispering Sands (Nan T. Achnas, Indonesia)
- Busan International Film Festival
  - Winner Road Movie (Kim Insik, South Korea)
- Cinefan Asian Film Festival
  - Winner Lan Yu (Stanley Kwan, Hong Kong)
- Cinemanila International Film Festival
  - Winner Hollywood Hong Kong (Fruit Chan, Hong Kong)
  - Special Mention Harmful Insect (Akihiko Shiota, Japan)
- Hawaii International Film Festival
  - Winner Eyes of a Beauty (Hu Guan, China)
- International Film Festival Rotterdam
  - Winner Wave (Hiroshi Okuhara, Japan)
  - Special Mention Secret Ballot (Babak Payami, Iran)
- Locarno International Film Festival
  - Winner Mr. & Mrs. Iyer (Aparna Sen, India)
  - Special Mention Our Times (Rakhshan Bani-Etemad, Iran)
  - Special Mention Obor Kalandia (Sobi al-Zobaidi, Palestine)
- Singapore International Film Festival
  - Winner Eliana, Eliana (Riri Riza, Indonesia)
  - Special Mention I-San Special (Mingmongkol Sonakul, Thailand)
- Taiwan International Documentary Festival
  - Winner Sky-blue Hometown (Kim So-young, South Korea)

=== 2003 ===
- Bangkok International Film Festival
  - Winner A Tale of a Naughty Girl (Buddhadeb Dasgupta, India)
- Berlin International Film Festival
  - Winner Blessing Bell (Hiroyuki Tanaka, Japan)
  - Special Mention Bird-Man Tale (Garin Nugroho, Indonesia)
- Brisbane International Film Festival
  - Winner Oasis (Lee Chang-dong, South Korea)
  - Special Mention Letters in the Wind (Ali Reza Aminal, Iran)
- Busan International Film Festival
  - Winner Untold Scandal (E J-yong, South Korea)
- Cinefan Asian Film Festival
  - Winner Drifters (Wang Xiaoshuai, China)
- Cinemanila International Film Festival
  - Winner Divine Intervention (Elia Suleiman, Palestine)
  - Special Mention Dekada '70 (Chito S. Rono, the Philippines)
- Karlovy Vary International Film Festival
  - Winner The Coast Guard (Kim Ki-duk, South Korea)
- Locarno International Film Festival
  - Winner Spring, Summer, Fall, Winter... and Spring (Kim Ki-duk, South Korea)
- Singapore International Film Festival
  - Winner 15 – The Movie (Royston Tan, Singapore)
  - Special Mention Unknown Pleasures (Jia Zhang-ke, China)
- Vesoul International Film Festival of Asian Cinema
  - Winner Cry Woman (Liu Bingjian, China)

=== 2004 ===
- Berlin International Film Festival
  - Winner South of the Clouds (Zhu Wen, China)
  - Special Mention Final Solution (Rakesh Sharma, India)
- Brisbane International Film Festival
  - Winner The River's End (Behrooz Afkhami, Iran)
- Busan International Film Festival
  - Winner 3-Iron (Kim Ki-duk, South Korea and Japan)
  - Special Mention So Cute (Kim Su-hyeon, South Korea)
- Cinemanila International Film Festival
  - Winner Min (Ho Yuhang, Malaysia)
- Dhaka International Film Festival
  - Winner Swaraaj – The Little Republic (Anwar Jamal, India)
- Hawaii International Film Festival
  - Winner Peep 'TV' Show (Yutaka Tsuchiya, Japan)
  - Honorable Mention Rewind (Hak-son Kim, South Korea)
- International Film Festival Rotterdam
  - Winner The Missing (Lee Kang-sheng, Taiwan)
  - Special Mention Uniform (Diao Yi'nan China)
- Locarno International Film Festival
  - Winner Story Undone (Hassan Yektapanah, Iran)
  - Winner The Hunter (Serik Aprymov, Kazakhstan)
- Osian's Cinefan Festival of Asian Cinema
  - Winner Listener's Choice (Abdellatif Abdelhamid, Syria)
- Singapore International Film Festival
  - Winner Ira Madiyama (Prasanna Vithanage, Sri Lanka)
- Tallinn Black Nights Film Festival
  - Winner The Taste of Tea (Katsuhito Ishii, Japan)
  - Special Mention Little Men (Nariman Turebajev; Kasahstan, France)
- Vesoul International Film Festival of Asian Cinema
  - Winner The First Letter (Abolfazl Jalili, Iran)

=== 2005 ===
- Berlin International Film Festival
  - Winner This Charming Girl (Lee Yoon-ki, South Korea)
- Brisbane International Film Festival
  - Winner Spying Cam (Hwang Chul-min, South Korea)
  - Special Mention Boat out of Watermelon Rinds (Ahmet Ulucay, Turkey)
- Busan International Film Festival
  - Winner The Unforgiven (Yoon Jong-bin, South Korea)
- Hawaii International Film Festival
  - Winner Season of the Horse (Ning Cai, Mongolia)
- International Film Festival Rotterdam
  - Winner Sanctuary (Ho Yuhang, Malaysia)
- Locarno International Film Festival
  - Winner So Much Rice (Li Hongqi, China)
  - Winner The Rising - Ballad of Mangal Pandey (Ketan Mehta, India)
- Osian's Cinefan Festival of Asian Cinema
  - Winner The Black and White Milk Cow (Jin Yang, China)
- Singapore International Film Festival
  - Winner Stray Dogs (Marzieh Meshkini, Iran)
- Tallinn Black Nights Film Festival
  - Winner Earth And Ashes (Atiq Rahimi, Afghanistan)
- Venice Film Festival
  - Winner 13 Tzameti (Géla Babluani, Georgia)
- Vesoul International Film Festival of Asian Cinema
  - Winner Two Great Sheep (Liu Hao, China)

=== 2006 ===
- Berlin International Film Festival
  - Winner Dear Pyongyang (Yang Yong-hi, Japan)
- Brisbane International Film Festival
  - Winner Blood Rain (Kim Dae-seung, South Korea)
- Busan International Film Festival
  - Winner The Last Dining Table (Roh Gyeong-tae, South Korea)
- Hawaii International Film Festival
  - Winner 4:30 (Royston Tan, Singapore)
- International Film Festival Rotterdam
  - Winner The Lost Hum (Hiromasa Hirosue, Japan)
  - Winner The Blossoming of Maximo Oliveros (Auraeus Solito, the Philippines)
- Locarno International Film Festival
  - Winner Don't Look Back (Kim Young-Nam, South Korea)
  - Winner Bliss (Sheng Zhimin, China)
- Osian's Cinefan Festival of Asian Cinema
  - Winner Midnight My Love (Kongdej Jaturanrasamee, Thailand)
- Singapore International Film Festival
  - Winner Todo todo teros (John Torres, the Philippines)
  - Special Mention Taking Father Home (Ying Liang, China)
- Tallinn Black Nights Film Festival
  - Winner Kargaran Mashghoule Karand (Mani Haghighi, Iran)
- Vesoul International Film Festival of Asian Cinema
  - Winner Gilane (Rakhshan Bani-Etemad and Mohsen Abdolvahab, Iran)

=== 2007 ===
- Antalya Film Festival
  - Winner Yumurta (Semih Kaplanoğlu, Turkey)
  - Winner Under the Bombs (Philippe Aractingi, Lebanon)
- Asiatica Film Mediale
  - Winner Pure Coolness (Ernest Abdyjaparov, Kyrgyzstan)
- Berlin International Film Festival
  - Winner Faces of a Fig Tree (Kaori Momoi, Japan)
  - Winner Tuli (Auraeus Solito, Philippines)
- Brisbane International Film Festival
  - Winner The Bet Collector (Jeffrey Jeturian, the Philippines)
- Busan International Film Festival
  - Winner With the Girl of Black Soil (Jeon Soo-il, South Korea)
  - Winner Hello Stranger (Kim Donghyun, South Korea)
- Eurasia International Film Festival
  - Winner Swallow (Abai Kulbai, Kazakhstan)
- Hawaii International Film Festival
  - Winner Owl and the Sparrow (Stephane Gauger, Vietnam)
- International Film Festival of Kerala
  - Winner – Asian Competition Getting Home (Zhang Yang, China)
  - Winner – Malayalam Competition Ore Kadal (Shyamaprasad, India)
- International Film Festival Rotterdam
  - Winner Fourteen (Hiromasa Hirosue, Japan)
  - Special Mention Dancing Bells (Deepak Kumaran Menon, Malaysia)
  - Special Mention How Is Your Fish Today? (Xiaolu Guo; China, UK)
- Jeonju International Film Festival
  - Winner Summer Heat (Brillante Mendoza, the Philippines)
- Karlovy Vary International Film Festival
  - Winner The Band's Visit (Bikur hatizmoret) (Eran Kolirin, Israel)
- Locarno International Film Festival
  - Winner Those Three (Naghi Nemati, Iran)
- Osian's Cinefan Festival of Asian and Arab Cinema
  - Winner Dancing Bells (Deepak Kumaran Menon, Malaysia)
- Singapore International Film Festival
  - Winner Crossing the Dust (Shawkat Amin Korki, Iraq)
  - Winner Like A Virgin (Lee Hae-young, Lee Hae-jun; South Korea)
- Taipei Golden Horse Film Festival
  - Winner The Unseeable (Wisit Sasanatieng, Thailand)
- Tallinn Black Nights Film Festival
  - Winner Mogari No Mori (Naomi Kawase, Japan)
- Vesoul International Film Festival of Asian Cinema
  - Winner Kantatar (Bappaditya Bandopadhyay, India)

=== 2008 ===
- Antalya Film Festival
  - Winner Sonbahar (Özcan Alper, Turkey)
- Asiatica Film Mediale
  - Winner Tokyo Sonata (Kiyoshi Kurosawa, Japan)
  - Winner Songs from the Southern Seas (Marat Sarulu, Kazakhstan)
- Berlin International Film Festival
  - Winner United Red Army (Kōji Wakamatsu, Japan)
  - Special Mention Paruthiveeran (Ameer Sultan, India)
- Brisbane International Film Festival
  - Winner Foster Child (Brillante Mendoza, the Philippines)
- Busan International Film Festival
  - Winner Members of the Funeral (Baek Seung-bin, South Korea)
  - Winner Treeless Mountain (Kim Soyong, South Korea)
- Eurasia International Film Festival
  - Winner Together with my Father (Danyar Salamat, Kazakhstan)
- Hawaii International Film Festival
  - Winner Brutus, Ang Paglalakbay (Tara Illenberger, the Philippines)
- Karlovy Vary International Film Festival
  - Winner Written (Kim Byung-woo, South Korea)
  - Winner Tulpan (Sergey Dvortsevoy, Kazakhstan)
- International Film Festival of Kerala
  - Winner – Asian Competition My Marlon and Brando (Hüseyin Karabey, Turkey)
  - Winner – Malayalam Competition Adayalangal (M.G. Sasi, India)
- International Film Festival Rotterdam
  - Winner What on Earth Have I Done Wrong?! (Doze Niu, Taiwan)
  - Special Mention Crude Oil (Wang Bing, China)
- Jeonju International Film Festival
  - Winner Children of God (Yi Seung-jun, Korea)
  - Winner Death in the Land of Enacantos (Lav Diaz, the Philippines)
- Locarno International Film Festival
  - Winner Daytime Drinking (Noh Young-seok, South Korea)
- Osian's Cinefan Festival of Asian Cinema
  - Winner Bioscope (K. M. Madhusudhanan, India)
- Singapore International Film Festival
  - Winner Tirador (Brillante Mendoza, the Philippines)
- Taipei Golden Horse Film Festival
  - Winner The Photograph (Nan Triveni Achnas, Indonesia)
  - Winner Sellout (Yeo Joon Han, Malaysia)
- Tallinn Black Nights Film Festival
  - Winner The Shaft (Zhang Chi, China)
- Vesoul International Film Festival of Asian Cinema
  - Winner The Old Barber (Hasi Chaolu, China)
  - Special Mention The Red Awn (Cai Shangjun, China)

=== 2009 ===
- Antalya Film Festival
  - Winner Thirst (Park Chan-wook, South Korea)
- Asian Film Festival Barcelona
  - Winner Claustrophobia (Ivy Ho, Hong Kong)
- Asiatica Film Mediale
  - Winner The Gift to Stalin (Rustem Abdrashov, Kazakhstan)
  - Winner Jamila and the President (Ratna Sarumpaet, Indonesia)
- Bangkok International Film Festival
  - Winner Independencia (Raya Martin, the Philippines)
- Berlin International Film Festival
  - Winner Doctor Ma's Country Clinic (Cong Feng, China)
  - Winner The Day After (Lee Suk-Gyung, South Korea)
- Brisbane International Film Festival
  - Winner About Elly (Asghar Farhadi, Iran)
  - Winner Agrarian Utopia (Uruphong Rakasasad, Thailand)
- Busan International Film Festival
  - Winner Paju (Park Chan-ok, South Korea)
- Cinemalaya Philippine Independent Film Festival
  - Winner Baseco Bakal Boys (Ralston Jover, the Philippines)
- Cines del Sur
  - Winner Flowers of the Sky (Prasanna Vithanage, Sri Lanka)
  - Winner Before the Burial (Behnam Behzadi, Iran)
- Hawaii International Film Festival
  - Winner Castaway on the Moon (Lee Hae-jun, South Korea)
- International Film Festival of Kerala
  - Winner – Asian Competition Jermal (Fishing Platform) (Ravi Bharwani, Indonesia)
  - Winner – Malayalam Competition Kerala Cafe (Lal Jose, Shaji Kailas, Revathi, Shyamaprasad, Anwar Rasheed, B. Unnikrishnan, Anjali Menon, M. Padmakumar, Shankar Ramakrishnan, Uday Ananthan; India)
- International Film Festival Rotterdam
  - Winner The Land (He Jia, China)
- Jeonju International Film Festival
  - Winner Imburnal (Sherad Anthony Sanchez, the Philippines)
- Karlovy Vary International Film Festival
  - Winner Breathless (Yang Ik-june, South Korea)
- Locarno International Film Festival
  - Winner At the End of Daybreak (Ho Yuhang, Malaysia)
  - Winner One Night in Supermarket (Yang Qing, China)
- Osian's Cinefan Festival of Asian and Arab Cinema
  - Winner The Long Night (Hatem Ali, Syria)
  - Winner Khargosh (Paresh Kamdar, India)
- Singapore International Film Festival
  - Winner Jalainur (Zhao Ye, China)
- Taipei Golden Horse Film Festival
  - Winner Blind Pig Who Wants to Fly (Edwin, Indonesia)
- Tallinn Black Nights Film Festival
  - Winner No One Knows About Persian Cats (Bahman Ghobadi, Iran)
- Third Eye Asian Film Festival
  - Winner The Gift to Stalin (Rustem Abdrashov, Kazakhstan)
- Vesoul International Film Festival of Asian Cinema
  - Winner Dawn of the World (Abbas Fahdel; Iraq, France)

=== 2010 ===
- Asian Film Festival Barcelona
  - Winner Between Two Worlds (Vimukthi Jayasundara, Sri Lanka)
- Asiatica Film Mediale
  - Winner Riding the Stallion of Dream (Girish Kasaravalli, India)
  - Winner Single Man (Hao Jie, China)
- Berlin International Film Festival
  - Winner Au Revoir Taipei (Arvin Chen, Taiwan)
- Busan International Film Festival
  - Winner Dooman River (Zhang Lu, South Korea and France)
- Chongqing Independent Film and Video Festival
  - Winner – Feature Film Fortune Teller (Xu Tong, China)
  - Winner – Short Film The Unnamed (Huang Yali, Taiwan)
- Cinemalaya Philippine Independent Film Festival
  - Winner Sheika (Arnel Mardoquio, the Philippines)
- Cines del Sur
  - Winner Adrift (Bui Thac Chuyen; Vietnam, France)
- Didor International Film Festival
  - Winner The Other Bank (George Ovashvili, Georgia)
- Hawaii International Film Festival
  - Winner Monga (Doze Niu, Taiwan)
- International Film Festival of Kerala
  - Winner – Asian Competition I Am Afia Megha Abhimanyu Omar (Onir Anirban, India)
  - Winner – Malayalam Competition Veettilekkulla Vazhi (Dr. Biju, India)
- International Film Festival Rotterdam
  - Winner Moscow (Whang Cheol-mean, South Korea)
- Jeonju International Film Festival
  - Winner Clash (Pepe Diokno, the Philippines)
- Karlovy Vary International Film Festival
  - Winner Son of Babylon (Mohamed Al-Daradji, Iraq)
  - Winner Orion (Zamani Esmati, Iran)
- Moscow International Film Festival
  - Winner Food and the Maiden (Minoru Kurimura, Japan)
- Singapore International Film Festival
  - Winner The Dreamer (Sang Pemimpi) (Riri Riza, Indonesia)
- Taipei Golden Horse Film Festival
  - Winner Mundane History (Anocha Suwichakornpong, Thailand)
- Third Eye Asian Film Festival
  - Winner Judge (Liu Jie, China)
- Vesoul International Film Festival of Asian Cinema
  - Winner Animal Town (Jeon Kyu-hwan, South Korea)
- Vietnam International Film Festival
  - Winner Sandcastle (Boo Junfeng, Singapore)

=== 2011 ===
- Abu Dhabi Film Festival
  - Winner Marathon Boy (Gemma Atwal; UK, India)
- Asiatica Film Mediale
  - Winner Dokhtar...Pedar...Dokhtar (Panahbarkhoda Rezaee, Iran)
- Busan International Film Festival
  - Winner The King of Pigs (Yeon Sang-ho, South Korea)
- Berlin International Film Festival
  - Winner Heaven's Story (Takahisa Zeze, Japan)
  - Special Mention Ways of the Sea (Sheron Dayoc, the Philippines)
- Chongqing Independent Film and Video Festival
  - Winner – Feature Film Old Dog (Pema Tseden, China)
  - Winner – Short Film Court Ladies (Shen Chaofang, China)
- Cinemalaya Philippine Independent Film Festival
  - Winner Boundary (Benito Bautista, the Philippines)
- Eurasia International Film Festival
  - Winner The Lead (Zulfikar Musakov, Uzbekistan)
- Hawaii International Film Festival
  - Winner Hanaan (Ruslan Pak, South Korea and Uzbekistan)
- International Film Festival of Kerala
  - Winner – Asian Competition At the End of It All (Aditi Roy, India)
  - Winner – Malayalam Competition Adaminte Makan Abu (Salim Ahamed, India)
- International Film Festival Rotterdam
  - Winner Black Blood (Zhang Miaoyan, China and France)
  - Winner The Day I Disappeared (Atousa Bandeh Ghiasabadi, Iran)
- Jeonju International Film Festival
  - Winner Single Man (Hao Jie, China)
- Karlovy Vary International Film Festival
  - Winner Once Upon a Time in Anatolia (Nuri Bilge Ceylan; Turkey, Bosnia and Herzegovina)
- Kolkata International Film Festival
  - Winner Guerrilla (Nasiruddin Yousuff, Bangladesh)
- Moscow International Film Festival
  - Winner The House Under the Water (Sepideh Farsi, Iran)
- Taipei Golden Horse Film Festival
  - Winner Bunohan (Dain Said, Malaysia)
- Tallinn Black Nights Film Festival
  - Winner Mourning (Morteza Farshbaf, Iran)
- Third Eye Asian Film Festival
  - Winner Gangor (Italo Spinelli; Italy, India)
- Vesoul International Film Festival of Asian Cinema
  - Winner P.S. (Elkin Tuychiev, Uzbekistan)
- Warsaw International Film Festival
  - Winner No 89 Shimen Road (Haolun Shu, Hong Kong)

=== 2012 ===
- Abu Dhabi Film Festival
  - Winner A World Not Ours (Mahdi Fleifel; Palestine, UK, Lebanon, Denmark and United Arab Emirates)
- Asiatica Film Mediale
  - Winner Parviz (Majid Barzegar, Iran)
- Bengaluru International Film Festival
  - Winner Epilogue (Amir Manor, Israel)
  - Winner Darling, Something's Wrong with Your Head (Susan Youssef, Palestine)
- Berlin International Film Festival
  - Winner Modest Reception (Mani Haghighi, Iran)
- Busan International Film Festival
  - Winner Jiseul (O Muel, South Korea)
- Cinemalaya Philippine Independent Film Festival
  - Winner - Directors Showcase Competition Bwakaw (Jun Lana, the Philippines)
  - Winner - New Breed Competition Diablo (Mes de Guzman, the Philippines)
- Eurasia International Film Festival
  - Winner Student (Darejan Omirbaev, Kazakhstan)
- Hanoi International Film Festival
  - Winner Night of Silence (Reis Çelik, Turkey)
- Hawaii International Film Festival
  - Winner Apparition (Isabel Sandoval, credited as Vincent Sandoval, the Philippines)
- International Film Festival of Kerala
  - Winner – Asian Competition I. D. (K. D. Kamal, India)
  - Winner – Malayalam Competition Ee Adutha Kalathu (Arun Kumar Aravind, India)
- International Film Festival Rotterdam
  - Winner Sentimental Animal (Wu Quan, China)
- Jeonju International Film Festival
  - Winner Florentina Hubaldo, CTE (Lav Diaz, the Philippines)
- Karlovy Vary International Film Festival
  - Winner Beyond the Hill (Emin Alper; Turkey, Greece)
- Kolkata International Film Festival
  - Winner 11 Flowers (Wang Xiaoshuai, China)
- Moscow International Film Festival
  - Winner The Horde (Andrei Proshkin, Russia)
- Taipei Golden Horse Film Festival
  - Winner The Love Songs of Tiedan (Hao Jie, China)
- Toronto International Film Festival
  - Winner The Land of Hope (Sion Sono; Japan, United Kingdom and Taiwan)
- Vesoul International Film Festival of Asian Cinema
  - Winner August Drizzle (Aruna Jayawardana, Sri Lanka)
  - Special Mention Return Ticket (Teng Yung-Shing; Taiwan, China)
- Warsaw International Film Festival
  - Winner Kalayaan (Adolfo Alix Jr., the Philippines)

=== 2013 ===
- Abu Dhabi Film Festival
  - Winner Harmony Lessons (Emir Baigazin; Kazakhstan, Germany, France)
- Asiatica Film Mediale
  - Winner Snow on Pines (Payman Maadi, Iran)
- Berlin International Film Festival
  - Winner When I Saw You (Annemarie Jacir; Palestine and Jordan)
- Busan International Film Festival
  - Winner Shuttlecock (Lee Yubin, South Korea)
- Cinemalaya Philippine Independent Film Festival
  - Winner - Directors Showcase Competition The Bit Player (Jeffrey Jeturian, the Philippines)
  - Winner - New Breed Competition Transit (Hannah Espia, the Philippines)
- Eurasia International Film Festival
  - Winner The Little Brother (Serik Aprymov, Kazakhstan)
  - Winner Waiting for the Sea (Bakhtyar Khudojnazarov, Tajikistan)
- Hawaii International Film Festival
  - Winner Monsoon Shootout (Amit Kumar, India)
- International Film Festival of Kerala
  - Winner – Asian Competition Meghe Dhaka Tara (Kamaleshwar Mukherjee, India)
  - Winner – Malayalam Competition CR No: 89 (P. P. Sudevan, India)
- International Film Festival Rotterdam
  - Winner What They Don't Talk About When They Talk About Love (Mouly Surya, Indonesia)
- Jeonju International Film Festival
  - Winner Flashback Memories 3D (Matsue Tetsuaki, Japan)
- Kolkata International Film Festival
  - Winner Television (Mostofa Sarwar Farooki, Bangladesh)
- Taipei Golden Horse Film Festival
  - Winner Mary Is Happy, Mary Is Happy (Nawapol Thamrongrattanarit, Thailand)
- Moscow International Film Festival
  - Winner A Cradle for Mother (Panahbarkhoda Rezaee, Iran)
- Pacific Meridian Film Festival
  - Winner Ilo Ilo (Anthony Chen, Singapore)
- Tripoli Film Festival
  - Winner Shakespeare Must Die (Ing Kanjanavanit, Thailand)
  - Winner Liberta (Kan Lume, Singapore)
- Toronto International Film Festival
  - Winner Qissa (Anup Singh; India, Germany)
- Vesoul International Film Festival of Asian Cinema
  - Winner With You Without You (Prasanna Vithanage, Sri Lanka)
- Warsaw International Film Festival
  - Winner Harmony Lessons (Emir Baigazin; Kazakhstan, Germany, France)

=== 2014 ===
- Abu Dhabi Film Festival
  - Winner Iraqi Odyssey (Samir, Iraq, Switzerland, Germany and United Arab Emirates)
- Bengaluru International Film Festival
  - Winner – Asian Cinema Competition Labour of Love (Aditya Vikram Sengupta, India)
  - Winner – Kannada Cinema Competition December-1 (P. Sheshadri, India)
- Berlin International Film Festival
  - Winner A Dream of Iron (Kelvin Kyung Kun Park, South Korea)
  - Winner Non-Fiction Diary (Jung Yoon-suk, South Korea)
- Bucheon International Fantastic Film Festival
  - Winner Wood Job! (Shinobu Yaguchi, Japan)
- Busan International Film Festival
  - Winner Socialphobia (Hong Seok-jae, South Korea)
- Cinemalaya Independent Film Festival
  - Winner - Directors Showcase Competition Hustisya (Joel Lamangan, the Philippines)
  - Winner - New Breed Competition Bwaya (Francis Pasion, the Philippines)
- Eurasia International Film Festival
  - Winner Adventure (Nariman Turebayev, Kazakhstan)
- Hanoi International Film Festival
  - Winner The Coffin Maker (Jason Paul Laxamana, the Philippines)
- Hawaii International Film Festival
  - Winner Titli (Kanu Behl, India)
- International Film Festival of Kerala
  - Winner – Asian Competition Summer, Kyoto (Hiroshi Toda, Japan)
  - Winner – Malayalam Competition Oraalppokkam (Sanal Kumar Sasidharan, India)
- International Film Festival Rotterdam
  - Winner 28 (Prasanna Jayakody, Sri Lanka)
- Jeonju International Film Festival
  - Winner Tokyo Family (Yoji Yamada, Japan)
- Jogja-NETPAC Asian Film Festival
  - Winner The Naked DJ (Kan Lume, Singapore)
- Taipei Golden Horse Film Festival
  - Winner Quick Change (Eduardo W. Roy Jr., the Philippines)
- Moscow International Film Festival
  - Winner Nagima (Zhanna Issabaeva, Kazakhstan)
  - Winner Eye Am (Hakki Kurtulus and Melik Saracoglu; Turkey, France)
- Pacific Meridian Film Festival
  - Winner A Hard Day (Kim Seong-hoon, South Korea)
- QCinema International Film Festival
  - Winner – Best Feature Ang Di Paglimot sa Alaala (Carl Joseph Papa, the Philippines)
  - Winner – Best Short Film Ang Nanay ni Justin Barber! (Victor Villanueva, the Philippines)
  - Special Mention Senior (Jed Medrano, the Philippines)
- Tallinn Black Nights Film Festival
  - Winner The Move (Marat Sarulu, Kyrgyzstan)
- Toronto International Film Festival
  - Winner Margarita, with a Straw (Shonali Bose, India)
- Vesoul International Film Festival of Asian Cinema
  - Winner The Ferry (Shi Wei, China)
- Warsaw International Film Festival
  - Winner 13 (Hooman Seyedi, Iran)

=== 2015 ===
- All Lights India International Film Festival
  - Winner Mina Walking (Yosef Baraki, Canada and Afghanistan)
- Busan International Film Festival
  - Winner Communication & Lies (Lee Seung-Won, South Korea)
- Busan International Short Film Festival
  - Winner Ketchup (Yan Baishen, Guo Chunning; China)
- Cinemalaya Independent Film Festival
  - Winner – Short Film Wawa (Angelie Mae Macalanda, the Philippines)
- Eurasia International Film Festival
  - Winner Kunanbai (Doskhan Zholzhaksynov, Kazakhstan)
- Hawaii International Film Festival
  - Winner The Kids (Sunny Yu, Taiwan)
- International Film Festival of Kerala
  - Winner – Asian Competition Yona (Nir Bergman, Israel)
  - Winner – Malayalam Competition Ottaal (Jayaraj, India)
- International Film Festival Rotterdam
  - Winner Poet on a Business Trip (Ju Anqi, China)
- Jeonju International Film Festival
  - Winner Under the Sun (Seulki Ahn, Korea)
- Jogja-NETPAC Asian Film Festival
  - Winner Nay (Djenar Maesa Ayu, Indonesia)
- Kolkata International Film Festival
  - Winner Blanka (Kohki Hasei; Japan, Italy, Philippines)
- Moscow International Film Festival
  - Winner Being Good (Mipo Oh, Japan)
  - Winner Arventur (Irina Evteeva, Russia)
- Pacific Meridian Film Festival
  - Winner Shadow Behind the Moon (Jun Lana, Philippines)
- Taipei Golden Horse Film Festival
  - Winner Kaaka Muttai (M. Manikandan, India)
- Tallinn Black Nights Film Festival
  - Winner Stranger (Yeremek Tursunov, Kazakhstan)
- Toronto International Film Festival
  - Winner The Whispering Star (Sion Sono, Japan)
- QCinema International Film Festival
  - Winner – Circle Competition for Filipino Films Sleepless (Prime Cruz, the Philippines)
  - Winner – DoQC Competition Crescent Rising (Sheron Dayoc, the Philippines)
- Vesoul International Film Festival of Asian Cinema
  - Winner The Monk (The Maw Naing, Myanmar)
  - Special Mention Chen Shiang-chyi in Exit (Chien Hsiang, Taiwan)
- Yakutsk International Film Festival
  - Winner God Johogoi (Sergei Potapov, Russia)

=== 2016 ===
- All Lights India International Film Festival
  - Winner Houra (Gholamreza Sagharchian, Iran)
- Bengaluru International Film Festival
  - Winner – Asian Cinema Competition Under Heaven (Dalmira Tilepbergen, Kyrgyzstan)
  - Winner – Asian Cinema Competition Thithi (Raam Reddy, India)
  - Winner – Kannada Cinema Competition Child of Debt (Umashankar Swamy, India)
- Bucheon International Fantastic Film Festival
  - Winner The Forest (Paul Spurrier, Thailand)
- Busan International Film Festival
  - Winner Merry Christmas Mr. Mo (Lim Dae-hyung, Korea)
- Cinemalaya Independent Film Festival
  - Winner – Feature Film Pamilya Ordinaryo (Eduardo Roy, Jr., the Philippines)
  - Winner – Short Film Ang Maangas, Ang Marikit, at Ang Makata (Jose Ibarra Guballa, the Philippines)
- Five Flavours Film Festival
  - Winner Tharlo (Pema Tseden, China)
- Hanoi International Film Festival
  - Winner The Green Carriage (Oleg Asadulin, Russia)
- Hawaii International Film Festival
  - Winner Knife in the Clear Water (Wan Xuebo, China)
- International Film Festival of Kerala
  - Winner – Asian Competition Cold of Kalandar (Mustafa Kara, Turkey)
  - Winner – Malayalam Competition Kammatipaadam (Rajeev Ravi, India)
- International Film Festival Rotterdam
  - Winner The Plague at the Karatas Village (Adilkhan Yerzhanov, Kazakhstan)
- Iranian Film Festival Australia
  - Winner Life and a Day (Saeed Roostaee, Iran)
- Jeonju International Film Festival
  - Winner Spy Nation (Choi Seung-ho, Korea)
- Jogja-Netpac Asian Film Festival
  - Winner Turah (Wicaksono Winsu Legowo, Indonesia)
- Kolkata International Film Festival
  - Winner Singing in Graveyards (Bradley Liew, Malaysia and the Philippines)
  - Winner Lady of the Lake (Haobam Pawan Kumar, India)
- Moscow International Film Festival
  - Winner Sonita (Rokhsareh Ghaemmaghami, Iran)
- Pacific Meridian Film Festival
  - Winner Immortal (Seyed Hadi Mohaghegh, Iran)
- QCinema International Film Festival
  - Winner – Circle Competition for Filipino Films Baboy Halas (Bagane Fiola, the Philippines)
  - Winner – QCShorts Competition Papa's Shadows (Inshallah Montero, the Philippines)
- Taipei Golden Horse Film Festival
  - Winner Apprentice (Boo Junfeng; Singapore, Germany, France, Hong Kong and Qatar)
- Tallinn Black Nights Film Festival
  - Winner Duet (David Nanesh, Iran)
- Toronto International Film Festival
  - Winner In Between (Maysaloun Hamoud, Israel and France)
- Vesoul International Film Festival of Asian Cinema
  - Winner Imbisibol (Lawrence Fajardo, the Philippines)
  - Special Mention Wednesday, May 9 (Vahid Jalilvand, Iran)
- Warsaw International Film Festival
  - Winner Blessed Benefit (Mahmoud al Massad; Jordan, Germany, Netherlands and Qatar)

=== 2017 ===
- Asian Film Festival Barcelona
  - Winner Diamond Island (Davy Chou; Cambodia, France, Germany, Thailand, Qatar)
  - Special Mention Children of Genghis (Zolbayar Dorj, Mongolia)
- Bengaluru International Film Festival
  - Winner – Kannada Cinema Competition Uppina Kagada (B. Suresha, India)
- Bucheon International Fantastic Film Festival
  - Winner The Village of No Return (Chen Yu-hsun; Taiwan, China)
- Busan International Film Festival
  - Winner February (Kim Joonghyun, South Korea)
- Cinemalaya Philippine Independent Film Festival
  - Winner – Feature Film Respeto (Alberto Monteras II, the Philippines)
  - Winner – Short Film Aliens Ata (Glenn Barit, the Philippines)
- Eurasia International Film Festival
  - Winner Centaur (Aktan Arym Kubat, Kazakhstan)
- Fajr International Film Festival
  - Winner The Home (Asghar Yousefinejad, Iran)
- Hawaii International Film Festival
  - Winner One Thousand Ropes (Tusi Tamasese, New Zealand)
- International Film Festival & Awards Macao
  - Winner Angels Wear White (Vivian Qu, Taiwan)
- International Film Festival of Kerala
  - Winner – Asian Competition Newton (Amit V Masurkar, India)
  - Winner – Malayalam Competition Thondimuthalum Driksakshiyum (Dileesh Pothan, India)
- International Film Festival Rotterdam
  - Winner Children are not Afraid of Death, Children are Afraid of Ghosts (Rong Guang Rong, China)
- Iranian Film Festival Australia
  - Winner Israfil (Ida Panahandeh, Iran)
- Jeonju International Film Festival
  - Winner The Painter's View (Kim Heecheol, South Korea)
- Jogja-NETPAC Asian Film Festival, Indonesia
  - Love and Shukla (original title Haanduk; Jatla Siddartha, India)
- Moscow International Film Festival
  - Winner Ordinary Person (Kim Bong-han, South Korea)
- Pacific Meridian Film Festival
  - Winner Nearest and Dearest (Ksenia Zueva, Russia)
- QCinema International Film Festival
  - Winner – Circle Competition for Filipino Films The Ashes and Ghost of Tayug 1931 (Christopher Gozum, the Philippines)
  - Winner – Asian Next Wave Competition Snow Woman (Kiki Sugino, Japan)
  - Winner – RainbowQC Competition Beach Rats (Eliza Hittman, USA)
  - Winner – QCShorts Competition Gikan Sa Ngitngit Nga Kinailadman (Kiri Dalena, the Philippines)
- Taipei Golden Horse Film Festival
  - Winner Malila: The Farewell Flower (Anucha Boonyawatana, Thailand)
- Tallinn Black Nights Film Festival
  - Winner Goodbye, Grandpa! (Yukihiro Morigaki, Japan)
- Toronto International Film Festival
  - Winner The Great Buddha+ (Huang Hsin-yao, Taiwan)
- Vesoul International Film Festival of Asian Cinema
  - Winner Going the Distance (Harumoto Yujiro, Japan)
- Warsaw International Film Festival
  - Winner Out of Frame (Wai Lun Kwok, China, Hong Kong)

=== 2018 ===
- Asian Film Festival Barcelona
  - Winner A Tiger in Winter (Lee Kwang-kuk, South Korea)
- Bengaluru International Film Festival
  - Winner – Asian Cinema Competition Excavator (Lee Ju-hyoung, South Korea)
  - Winner – Kannada Cinema Competition Beti (Daughter) (P. Sheshadri, India)
- Bucheon International Fantastic Film Festival
  - Winner The Hungry Lion (Takaomi Ogata, Japan)
  - Winner I'm Crazy (Masaaki Kudo, Japan)
- Busan International Film Festival
  - Winner House of Hummingbird (Kim Bora, South Korea)
- Cinemalaya Philippine Independent Film Festival
  - Winner – Feature Film Kung Paano Hinihintay Ang Dapithapon (Carlo Enciso Catu, the Philippines)
  - Winner – Short Film Sa Saiyang Isla (Christian Candelaria, the Philippines)
- Fajr International Film Festival
  - Winner Hendi & Hormoz (Abbas Amini; Iran, Czech Republic)
- Hanoi International Film Festival
  - Winner Student A (Lee Kyung-sup, South Korea)
- Hawaii International Film Festival
  - Winner Still Human (Oliver Siu Kuen Chan, Hong Kong)
- International Film Festival & Awards Macao
  - Winner Suburban Birds (Qiu Sheng, China)
- International Film Festival of Kerala
  - Winner Ee.Ma.Yau (Lijo Jose Pellissery, India)
- International Film Festival Rotterdam
  - Winner Nervous Translation (Shireen Seno, the Philippines)
- Jeonju International Film Festival
  - Winner Adulthood (Kim Inseon, South Korea)
- Jogja-NETPAC Asian Film Festival
  - Winner The Song of Grassroots (Yuda Kurniawan, Indonesia)
- Kathmandu International Mountain Film Festival
  - Winner Trembling Mountain (Kesang Tseten Lama, Nepal)
- Kolkata International Film Festival
  - Winner The Sweet Requiem (Ritu Sarin & Tenzing Sonam; India)
- Moscow International Film Festival
  - Winner China's Van Goghs (Yu Haibo & Yu Tianqi Kiki; China, the Netherlands)
- Pacific Meridian Film Festival
  - Winner An Elephant Sitting Still (Hu Bo, China)
- QCinema International Film Festival
  - Winner – Circle Competition for Filipino Films Dog Days (Timmy Harn, the Philippines)
- Shaken Aimanov International Film Festival
  - Winner The Secret of a Leader (Farkhat Sharipov, Kazakhstan)
- Taipei Golden Horse Film Festival
  - Winner With All My Hypothalamus (Dwein Baltazar, the Philippines)
- Tallinn Black Nights Film Festival
  - Winner Kejal (Nima Salehiyar, Iran)
- Toronto International Film Festival
  - Winner The Third Wife (Ash Mayfair, Vietnam)
  - Special Mention The Crossing (Bai Xue, China)
- Ulju Mountain Film Festival
  - Winner Trembling Mountain (Kesang Tseten Lama, Nepal)
- Vesoul International Film Festival of Asian Cinema
  - Winner The Taste of Rice Flower (Pengfei, China)
  - Winner Mothers (Lee Dong-eun, South Korea)
  - Special Mention A Letter to the President (Roya Sadat, Afghanistan)
- Warsaw International Film Festival
  - Winner The Fall (Zhou Lidong, China)

=== 2019 ===
- Asian Film Festival Barcelona
  - Winner Father and Son (Lương Đình Dũng, Vietnam)
- Asiatica Film Mediale
  - Winner Flavours of Flesh (Biriyaani) (Sajin Babu, India)
- Bengaluru International Film Festival
  - Winner – Asian Cinema Competition Sivaranjini and other Women (Vasanth, India)
  - Winner – Kannada Cinema Competition Nathicharami (Mansore, India)
- Bucheon International Fantastic Film Festival
  - Winner Gully Boy (Zoya Akhtar, India)
- Busan International Film Festival
  - Winner Moving On (Yoon Danbi, South Korea)
- Cinemalaya Philippine Independent Film Festival
  - Winner – Feature Film John Denver Trending (Arden Rod Condez, the Philippines)
  - Winner – Short Film Disconnection Notice (Glenn Averia, the Philippines)
  - Special Mention – Short Film Sa Among Agwat (Don Senoc, the Philippines)
- El Gouna Film Festival
  - Winner Kabul, City in the Wind (Aboozar Amini; Afghanistan, Netherlands, Japan, Germany)
- Eurasia International Film Festival
  - Winner Beanpole (Kantemir Balagov, Russia)
- Fajr International Film Festival
  - Winner The Narrow Red Line (Farzad Khoshdast, Iran)
- Hainan International Film Festival
  - Winner Verdict (Raymund Ribay Gutierrez, the Philippines)
- Hawaii International Film Festival
  - Winner Another Child (Kim Yoon-seok, South Korea)
- International Film Festival of Kerala
  - Winner – Asian Competition Aani Maani (Fahim Irshad, India)
  - Winner – Malayalam Competition Tress Under the Sun (Dr. Biju, India)
  - Special Mention – Malayalam Competition Kumbalangi Nights (Madhu C Narayanan, India)
- International Film Festival and Awards Macao
  - Winner To Live to Sing (Johnny Ma, China)
- International Film Festival Rotterdam
  - Winner Last Night I Saw You Smiling (Kavich Neang; Cambodia, France)
- International Short and Independent Film Festival Dhaka
  - Winner Fish Musing (Suborna Senjutee Tushee; India, Bangladesh)
- Jeonju International Film Festival
  - Winner The Harvest (Misho Antadze, Georgia)
- Jogja-NETPAC Asian Film Festival
  - Winner Aurora (Bekzat Pirmatov, Kyrgyzstan)
  - Winner Nakorn-Sawan (Puangsoi Aksornsawang, Thailand)
- Kolkata International Film Festival
  - Winner Devi Aur Hero (Aditya Kripalani, India)
- Moscow International Film Festival
  - Winner The Sun Above Me Never Sets (Lyubov Borisova, Russia)
- Pacific Meridian Film Festival
  - Winner Great Poetry (Alexander Lungin, Russia)
- QCinema International Film Festival
  - Winner – Asian Next Wave Competition Suburban Birds (Qiu Sheng, China)
- Taipei Golden Horse Film Festival
  - Winner My Prince Edward (Wong Yee-lam, Hong Kong)
- Tallinn Black Nights Film Festival
  - Winner Golden Voices (Evgeny Ruman, Israel)
- Toronto International Film Festival
  - Winner 1982 (Oualid Mouaness; Lebanon, USA, Qatar, Norway)
- Ulju Mountain Film Festival
  - Winner Beloved (Yaser Talebi, Iran)
- Vesoul International Film Festival of Asian Cinema
  - Winner A Family Tour (Ying Liang; Hong Kong, Taiwan, Singapore, Malaysia)
- Warsaw Film Festival
  - Winner Move the Grave (Seung-o Jeong, South Korea)

=== 2020 ===
- Asian Film Festival Barcelona
  - Winner A Dark, Dark Man (Adilkhan Yerzhanov, Kazakhstan)
- Asiatica Film Mediale
  - Winner No Choice (Reza Dormishian, Iran)
- Bengaluru International Film Festival
  - Winner – Asian Cinema Competition Happy Old Year (Nawapol Thamrongrattanarit, Thailand)
  - Winner – Kannada Cinema Competition Pingara (Preetham R Shetty, India)
- Bucheon International Fantastic Film Festival
  - Winner I WeirDo (Liao Mingyi, Taiwan)
- Busan International Film Festival
  - Winner Fighter (Jero Yun, South Korea)
- Busan International Short Film Festival
  - Winner Adam (Shoki Lin, Singapore)
  - Winner Tiger and Ox (Kim Seunghee, South Korea)
- Cinemalaya Philippine Independent Film Festival
  - Winner – Short Film Tokwifi (Carla Pulido Ocampo, the Philippines)
- El Gouna Film Festival
  - Winner In Between Dying (Hilal Baydarov; Azerbaijan, Mexico, United States)
- International Film Festival Rotterdam
  - Winner Nasir (Arun Karthick; India, Netherlands, Singapore)
- Jeonju International Film Festival
  - Winner The Shepherdess and the Seven Songs (Pushpendra Singh, India)
- Pacific Meridian Film Festival
  - Winner In Deep Sleep (Maria Ignatenko, Russia)
- Taipei Golden Horse Film Festival
  - Winner The Story of Southern Islet (Chong Keat Aun, Malaysia)
- Tallinn Black Nights Film Festival
  - Winner Ulbolsyn (Adilkhan Yerzhanov, Kazakhstan)
- Toronto International Film Festival
  - Winner Gaza mon amour (Tarzan Nasser & Arab Nasser; Palestine, France, Germany, Portugal, Qatar)
- Ulju Mountain Film Festival
  - Winner Lunana: A Yak in the Classroom (Pawo Choyning Dorji, Bhutan)
- Vesoul International Film Festival of Asian Cinema
  - Winner Saturday Afternoon (Mostofa Sarwar Farooki, Bangladesh)
- Warsaw Film Festival
  - Winner The Asadas (Ryota Nakano, Japan)

=== 2021 ===
- Asian Film Festival Barcelona
  - Winner Eternally Younger Than Those Idiots (Ryuhei Yoshino, Japan)
  - Special Mention Cafe by the Highway (Shi Xiaofan, China)
- Bucheon International Fantastic Film Festival
  - Winner Beyond The Infinite Two Minutes (Yamaguchi Junta, Japan)
- Busan International Short Film Festival
  - Winner Georgia (Jayil Pak; South Korea, USA)
- Cinemalaya Philippine Independent Film Festival
  - Winner – Short Film The Little Planet (Arjanmar H. Rebeta, the Philippines)
- El Gouna Film Festival
  - Winner Captain Volkonogov Escaped (Aleksey Chupov & Natasha Merkulova; Russia, Estonia, France)
  - Special Mention Once Upon a Time in Calcutta (Aditya Vikram Sengupta; India, France, Norway)
- Fajr International Film Festival
  - Winner Major (Ehsan Abdipour, Iran)
- Hawaii International Film Festival
  - Winner Anima (Cao Jinling, China)
- International Film Festival of Kerala
  - Winner – Malayalam Competition Musical Chair (Vipin Atley, India)
- Jeonju International Film Festival
  - Winner Jazz Kissa Basie (Hoshino Tetsuya, Japan)
- Kolkata International Film Festival
  - Winner The Salt In Our Waters (Rezwan Shahriar Sumit; Bangladesh, France)
- Moscow International Film Festival
  - Winner Mosul my Home (Adalet R. Garmiany, Iraq)
- QCinema International Film Festival
  - Winner – QCShorts Competition Skylab (Chuck Escasa, the Philippines)
- Taipei Golden Horse Film Festival
  - Winner May You Stay Forever Young (Rex Ren & Lam Sam, Hong Kong)
- Toronto International Film Festival
  - Winner Costa Brava, Lebanon (Mounia Akl; Lebanon, France, Qatar, Spain, Sweden, Denmark, Norway, United States)
- Ulju Mountain Film Festival
  - Winner Bandar Band (Manijeh Hekmat, Iran)
- Warsaw Film Festival
  - Winner Cinema Sabaya (Orit Fokus Rotem, Israel)
  - Special Mention YT (Stepan Burnashev & Dmitrii Davydov, Russia)

=== 2022 ===
- Asian Film Festival Barcelona
  - Winner Streetwise (Na Jiazuo, China)
- Bucheon International Fantastic Film Festival
  - Winner Office Royale (Seki Kazuaki, Japan)
- Busan International Film Festival
  - Winner A Wild Roomer (Lee Jeong-hong, South Korea)
- Busan International Short Film Festival
  - Winner The Boys Club (Chen Yih Wen, Malaysia)
- Cinemalaya Philippine Independent Film Festival
  - Winner – Feature Film 12 Weeks (Anna Isabelle Matutina, the Philippines)
  - Winner – Short Film Black Rainbow (Zig Madamba Dulay; the Philippines, United States)
- Eurasia International Film Festival
  - Winner Fire (Aizhan Kasymbek, Kazakhstan)
- Golden Horse Film Festival
  - Winner Autobiography (Makbul Mubarak; Indonesia, France, Germany, Poland, Singapore, Philippines, Qatar)
- Hanoi International Film Festival
  - Winner Bone Marrow (Hamid Reza Ghorbani, Iran)
  - Winner The Villain Kontrabida (Adolfo Alix Jr., Philippines)
- International Film Festival of Kerala
  - Winner – Asian Competition Alam (Firas Khoury; France, Tunisia, Palestine, Saudi Arabia, Qatar)
  - Winner – Malayalam Competition Ariyippu (Mahesh Narayanan, India)
- Jeonju International Film Festival
  - Winner Journey to the West (Kong Dashan, China)
- Jogja-NETPAC Asian Film Festival
  - Winner Let Me Hear It Barefoot (Riho Kudo, Japan)
- Kazan International Festival of Muslim Cinema
  - Winner Silent Glory (Nahid Hassanzadeh, Iran)
- Kolkata International Film Festival
  - Winner Manikbabur Megh (Abhinandan Banerjee, India)
  - Winner Dov (Muhiddin Muzaffar, Tajikistan)
- Moscow International Film Festival
  - Winner Adim (Juboraj Shamim; Bangladesh, Netherlands)
- QCinema International Film Festival
  - Winner – Asian Next Wave Competition Return to Seoul (Davy Chou; France, Belgium, Germany, Cambodia)
  - Winner – QCShorts Competition Luzonensis osteoporosis (Glenn Barit, the Philippines)
- Toronto International Film Festival
  - Winner Sweet As (Jub Clerc, Australia)
- Ulju Mountain Film Festival
  - Winner – Short Film Without You (Park Jae-hyun, South Korea)
- Vesoul International Film Festival of Asian Cinema
  - Winner Aloners (Hong Sung-eun, South Korea)
- Warsaw Film Festival
  - Winner Ademoka's Education (Adilkhan Yerzhanov, Kazakhstan)

=== 2023 ===
- Asian Film Festival Barcelona
  - Winner The Baseball Player (Carlo Obispo, the Philippines)
- Bucheon International Fantastic Film Festival
  - Winner Hungry Ghost Diner (Cho We Jun, Malaysia)
- Busan International Film Festival
  - Winner Solids by the Seashore (Patiparn Boontarig, Thailand)
- Busan International Short Film Festival
  - Winner Graveyard of Horses (Xiaoxuan Jiang, China)
- Cinemalaya Philippine Independent Film Festival
  - Winner – Feature Film The Missing (Carl Joseph Papa, the Philippines)
  - Winner – Short Film Hinakdal (Arvin Belarmino, the Philippines)
- Danang Asian Film Festival
  - Winner – Best Vietnamese Film Memento Mori: Earth (Marcus Mang Cuong Vu, Vietnam)
- El Gouna Film Festival
  - Winner From Abdul to Leila (Leila Al Bayaty; Germany, Belgium, Saudi Arabia)
- Golden Horse Film Festival
  - Winner Fly Me to the Moon (Sasha Chuk, Hong Kong)
- Hawaii International Film Festival
  - Winner If Only I Could Hibernate (Zoljargal Purevdashi; France, Mongolia)
- International Film Festival of Kerala
  - Winner – Asian Competition Sunday (Shokir Kholikov, Uzbekistan)
  - Winner – Malayalam Competition Aattam (Anand Ekarshi, India)
- International Film Festival Rotterdam
  - Winner Whispering Mountains (Jagath Manuwarna, Sri Lanka)
- Jeonju International Film Festival
  - Winner Stonewalling (Huang Ji and Ryuji Otsuka, Japan)
- Jio MAMI Mumbai Film Festival
  - Winner Rapture (Dominic Sangma; India, China, Switzerland, Netherlands, Qatar)
- Jogja-NETPAC Asian Film Festival
  - Winner Which Colour? (Shahrukhkhan Chavada, India)
- Kolkata International Film Festival
  - Winner Broken Dreams: Stories from the Myanmar Coup (The Ninefold Mosaic, Myanmar)
- QCinema International Film Festival
  - Winner Mimang (Kim Tae-yang, South Korea)
- Tallinn Black Nights Film Festival
  - Winner Inpaintings (Ozan Yoleri, Turkey)
- Toronto International Film Festival
  - Winner A Match (Jayant Digambar Somalkar, India)
  - Special mention: Mimang (Kim Taeyang, South Korea)
- Venice Film Festival
  - Winner Shadow of Fire (Shinya Tsukamoto, Japan)
- Vesoul International Film Festival of Asian Cinema
  - Winner Cold As Marble (Asif Rustamov, Azerbaijan)
- Warsaw Film Festival
  - Winner Ani Choying Drolma: Mission Impossible (F. Jennifer Lin and Shan Bai, Hong Kong)

=== 2024 ===
- Asian Film Festival Barcelona
  - Winner Hollywoodgate (Ibrahim Nash’at; Afghanistan, Germany)
- Bastau International Film Festival
  - Winner Vaziyet (Ufuk Gürbüzdal, Türkiye)
- Bengaluru International Film Festival
  - Winner Swathi Mutthina Male Haniye (Raj B. Shetty, India)
- Bucheon International Fantastic Film Festival
  - Winner Who’ll Stop the Rain (Su I-hsuan, Taiwan)
- Busan International Film Festival
  - Winner The Land Of Morning Calm (Park Ri-woong, South Korea)
- Busan International Short Film Festival
  - Winner Minus One (Omer Ferhat Ozmen, Turkey)
- Cairo International Film Festival
  - Winner Brief History of a Family (Lin Jianjie; China, France, Denmark, Qatar)
- Cinemalaya Philippine Independent Film Festival
  - Winner – Feature Film Tumandok (Richard Jeroui Salvadico and Arlie Sweet Sumagaysay, the Philippines)
  - Winner – Short Film Abogbaybay (P. R. Monencillo, the Philippines)
- Danang Asian Film Festival
  - Winner – Best Vietnamese Film Face Off 7: One Wish (Lý Hải, Vietnam)
- El Gouna Film Festival
  - Winner We Are Inside (Farah Kassem; Lebanon, Qatar, Denmark)
- Golden Horse Film Festival
  - Winner Montages of a Modern Motherhood (Oliver Chan, Hong Kong)
- Hanoi International Film Festival
  - Winner Liar (Yuliya Trofimova, Russia)
- Hawaii International Film Festival
  - Winner Sister Midnight (Karan Kandahari; India, Sweden, United Kingdom)
- International Film Festival of Kerala
  - Winner – Asian Competition Me, Maryam, the Children and 26 Others (Farshad Hashemi; Czech Republic, Germany, Iran)
  - Winner – Malayalam Competition Feminichi Fathima (Fasil Muhammed, India)
- International Film Festival Rotterdam
  - Winner Schirkoa: In Lies We Trust (Ishan Shukla; India, France, Germany)
- Jeonju International Film Festival
  - Winner Punch Drunk (Adel Tabrizi), Iran)
- Kolkata International Film Festival
  - Winner Dolls Don't Die (Ranajit Ray, India)
- Jio MAMI Mumbai Film Festival
  - Winner Girls Will Be Girls (Shuchi Talati; India, France)
  - Special Mention Agent of Happiness (Arun Bhattarai and Dorottya Zurbó; Bhutan, Hungary)
  - Special Mention Shambhala (Min Bahadur Bham; Nepal, France, Norway, Hong Kong, China, Turkey, Taiwan, United States, Qatar)
- Jogja-NETPAC Asian Film Festival
  - Winner: MA - Cry of Silence (The Maw Naing; Myanmar, South Korea, Singapore, France, Norway, Qatar)
- Moscow International Film Festival
  - Winner We Should Make Movies About Love (Roman Mikhailov; Russia, India)
  - Special Mention Cold Sigh (Nahid Azizi Sedigh, Iran)
- Pingyao International Film Festival
  - Winner – Best First Film Floating Clouds Obscure The Sun (Shen Tao, China)
- QCinema International Film Festival
  - Winner – Best Asian First Film Cu Li Never Cries (Pham Ngoc Lan; Vietnam, Singapore, France, Philippines, Norway)
- Toronto International Film Festival
  - Winner The Last of the Sea Women (Sue Kim, United States)
- Ulju Mountain Film Festival
  - Winner After the Snowmelt (Lo Yi-Shan; Taiwan, Japan)
- Venice Film Festival
  - Winner Mistress Dispeller (Elizabeth Lo; United States, China)
- Vesoul International Film Festival of Asian Cinema
  - Winner Scream (Kenzhebek Shaikakov, Kazakhstan)
- Warsaw Film Festival
  - Winner Black Dog (Guan Hu, China)

=== 2025 ===
- Baiqonyr Film Festival
  - Winner Ansar (Anurbek Khamitov, Kazakhstan)
- Bucheon International Fantastic Film Festival
  - Winner Young & Fine (Kominami Toshiya, Japan)
- Busan International Film Festival
  - Winner Malika (Natalia Uvarova; Kazakhstan, Moldova, Ireland)
- Cairo International Film Festival
  - Winner The Botanist (Jing Yi, Kazakhstan)
- Cinemalaya Philippine Independent Film Festival
  - Winner – Feature Film Republika ng Pipolipinas (Renei Dimla, the Philippines)
  - Winner – Short Film Hasang (Daniel de la Cruz, the Philippines)
- Danang Asian Film Festival
  - Winner – Best Vietnamese Film The Real Sister (Khuong Ngoc, Vietnam)
- El Gouna Film Festival
  - Winner - Best Asian Documentary Always (Chen Deming; US, France, China)
  - Winner - Best Asian Narrative Shadowbox (Tanushree Das, Saumyananda Sahi; India, France, US, Spain)
- Golden Horse Film Festival
  - Winner MAG MAG (Yuriyan Retriever, Japan)
- Hawaii International Film Festival
  - Winner Kōkā (Kath Akuhata-Brown, New Zealand)
- International Film Festival Rotterdam
  - Winner Bad Girl (Varsha Bharath, India)
- Jeonju International Film Festival
  - Winner Black Ox (Tsuta Tetsuichiro; Japan, Taiwan, United States)
- Jogja-NETPAC Asian Film Festival
  - Winner: Becoming Human (Polen Ly, Cambodia)
- Kolkata International Film Festival
  - Winner Victoria (Sivaranjini J., India)
- Moscow International Film Festival
  - Winner Ha Lyngkha Bneng (Pradip Kurbah, India)
- Pingyao International Film Festival
  - Winner – Best First Film Daughters (Miao Zhuangzhuang, China)
- QCinema International Film Festival
  - Winner – Best Asian First Film On Your Lap (Reza Rahadian, Indonesia)
- Tallinn Black Nights Film Festival
  - Winner The Muralist (Sengedorj Janchivdorj, Mongolia)
- Toronto International Film Festival
  - Winner In Search of the Sky (Jitank Singh Gurjar, India)
- Venice Film Festival
  - Winner Hijra (Shahad Ameen; Saudi Arabia, Iraq, Egypt, UK)
- Vesoul International Film Festival of Asian Cinema
  - Winner Abel (Elzat Eskendir, Kazakhstan)
  - Winner – Aruna Vasudev NETPAC Award for Best Asia Pacific Film 2024 All We Imagine as Light (Payal Kapadia; France, India, Netherlands, Luxembourg, Italy)

=== 2026 ===
- Bengaluru International Film Festival
  - Winner Hakkighagi (Garghee Karehaiklu, India)
- Bucheon International Fantastic Film Festival
  - Winner Knock (Jeong Beom, South Korea)
- Cinemalaya Philippine Independent Film Festival
  - Winner – Feature Film Status: Rejected (Vahn Leinard C. Pascual, the Philippines)
  - Winner – Short Film The River Flows in Different Places (Lot-Lot Hermosura, the Philippines)
- Danang Asian Film Festival
  - Winner – Best Vietnamese Film Red Rain (Đặng Thái Huyền, Vietnam)
- International Film Festival Rotterdam
  - Winner i grew an inch when my father died (P. R. Monencillo Patindol, the Philippines)
- Jeonju International Film Festival
  - Winner Numb (Uchiyama Takuya, Japan)
- Toronto International Film Festival
  - Winner: Thirteen in Gaza (Hosam Abu Dan, Palestine)
- Vesoul International Film Festival of Asian Cinema
  - Winner Before the Bright Day (Tsao Shih-han, Taiwan)
  - Winner – Aruna Vasudev NETPAC Award for Best Asia Pacific Film 2025 No Other Choice (Park Chan-wook, South Korea)
- Venice Film Festival
  - Winner Lovers in the Blue Night (Anuparna Roy; United States, India)
- Yakutsk International Film Festival
  - Winner Adamya (Ranjan Ghosh; India)

== See also ==
- Central Asian and Southern Caucasus Film Festivals Confederation
- Osian's Cinefan Festival of Asian & Arab Cinema
- Toronto International Film Festival NETPAC Prize
