= Love and Shukla =

- Directed by: Jatla Siddartha
- Written by: Amanda Mooney; Jatla Siddartha
- Produced by: Amanda Mooney; Jatla Siddartha
- Starring: Sahaarsh Shuklaa Taneea Rajawat
- Cinematography: Jatla Siddartha
- Edited by: Srijan Chaurasia; Amanda Mooney; Jatla Siddartha
- Music by: Karl Heortweard
- Distributed by: Amazon Prime Video
- Release date: 2017
- Running time: 107 minutes
- Country: India
- Language: Hindi

Love and Shukla is a 2017 Hindi-language drama film directed Jatla Siddartha and produced by Amanda Mooney and Jatla Siddartha starrng Sahaarsh Shuklaa and Taneea Rajawat as lead prime rule.

The movie was screened at Busan International Film Festival and Palm Springs International Film Festival.

== Cast ==
- Sahaarsh Shuklaa as Manu Shukla
- Taneea Rajawat as Lakshmi
- Hima Singh as Rupa
- Aparna Upadhyay as Manu's mother
- Loknath Tiwari as Manu's father
- Sambhaji Sasane as Rupa's husband

== Critical reception ==
Wendy Ide for Screen Daily reviewed the movie and stated "Shukla’s mother is overbearing to the point of cliché."

Suktara Ghosh for The Quint rated the movie 3.5/5 stars, praised Saharsh Kumar Shukla's performance and wrote "He might be little educated and lack “heroic” qualities, but he has his heart in the right place."

== Award ==
| Award | Year | Result | Note |
|---|---|---|---|
| NETPAC Award | 2017 | Won | |
