= Vettappattikalum Oattakkarum =

2022 Indian film by Rarish G

- Directed by: Rarish G
- Written by: Rarish G
- Screenplay by: Rarish G
- Story by: Rarish G
- Produced by: Rarish G
- Cinematography: Rarish G
- Edited by: Sumesh Somanathan; Rarish G
- Music by: Jayesh Stephen
- Production company: Paradise Merchants Motion Picture Company
- Release date: 11 December 2022
- Running time: 90 minutes
- Country: India
- Language: Malayalam

Vettappattikalum Oattakkarum (transl. The Hounds and The Runners) is a 2022 independent, experimental, Malayalam language mockumentary film, produced and directed by Rarish G, in his debut directorial. The film starred a bunch of newcomers, had its official premiere on 11 December 2022.

The film was nominated for the best film and director awards at the 53rd Kerala State Film Awards and won the Special Jury Mention for direction for Rarish G. The film was premiered at IFFK 2022.

== Summary ==
Vettappattikalum Oattakkarum is a social satire, that shows the violation of personal freedom and privacy, that has become a common issue today.

== Cast ==
- Athira Harikumar – Sabitha / Kani
- Adith U S – Kevin Kuriakose
- Thomas George – Sreekandan Nair
- Usha T T – Kumari Chandrika
- Esha Reshu – Reshma
- Kannan Nair – Joey
- Alappey Ponnappan – Alappuzha Chandran
- K K Menon – Balasubramanian
- Abraham Mathew – Joshy Tharakan

== Production ==
Rarish G, a Varkala native, though produced a film titled as ‘My Name is Blood’, that was dropped in 2013, launched himself as the director with Vettappattikalum Oattakkarum, while producing the film. Rarish stated that, "The selection of my work at the IFFK is a vindication for my struggles". The film also received support through crowd funding. Rarish started writing the film in 2016 and the shooting started in 2017, that lasted till 2022.

== Accolades ==
- 27th International Film Festival of Kerala (IFFK 2022) Malayalam Cinema Today - Official Selection.
- Kerala State Film Awards Special Jury Mention - Best Director
- Vesoul International Film Festival of Asian Cinema, 2024 - Official Selection
