= Whisperings of the Moon =

- Directed by: Yuqing Lai
- Written by: Xinyi Cao Yuqing Lai Jatla Siddartha
- Produced by: Li Esther; Jatla Siddartha; Shen Wei; Yuan Yang; Huang Yue
- Starring: Dina Huon; Monita Keo; Deka Nine; KB Saadi; Sopheanith Thong
- Cinematography: Yuqing Lai
- Edited by: Ahmad Fesdi Anggoro
- Distributed by: Inwave Films
- Release date: September 2025
- Running time: 85 minutes
- Countries: Hong Kong; China; Cambodia; India
- Languages: Khmer; English

Whisperings of the Moon is a 2025 Cambodian film directed by Lai Yuqing and marks her debut feature.

== Plot ==
The theater actress Nisay returns to her hometown after the death of her father and reconnects with her former lover, Thida. While their love finds its fullest expression on stage, in life they must navigate the pain of goodbyes.

== Cast ==
- Dina Huon
- Monita Keo
- Deka Nine as Thida
- KB Saadi
- Sopheanith Thong as Nisay

== Development ==
The project developed from Love is a Book, which Lai created during the New Asian Filmmakers Collective workshop in Phnom Penh under the mentorship of Jatla Siddartha, alongside mentors Lou Ye and Truong Minh Quý. The short explored two intertwined queer love stories: one between two men whose casual relationship deepens emotionally, and another between two women reconnecting after years apart, both reflecting love’s ambiguity and tenderness.

== Release ==
The film had its world premiere at the 30th Busan International Film Festival in 2025. The director, Yuqing, died at the age of 23, months after the film’s world premiere. It won the Jury Award for Best Narrative Feature at the Slamdance Film Festival 2026.

Paris-based sales company Inwave Films has joined the project. Co-founders Xueyin Li and Yuxuan Zhang stated: “Notably, her imagery carries a rhythm and fluidity akin to dance, moving with the bodies of the characters; when combined with sound, it produces a heightened sense of imagination and vitality that extends far beyond the image itself.” Inwaves is known for distributing Cannes, Berlinale, and Locarno titles.

== Reception ==
Panos Kotzathanasis of Asian Movie Pulse describes the work as an ambitious project that blends multiple timelines, a film within a play, and experimental elements. Gabe Lillianthal of The Rolling Tape highlights the camera movement: "There is rarely a moment in the film where the camera is static. The director, co-writer, and cinematographer approaches the film as if she were an active participant in each scene. The shots are primarily handheld, zoomed in, and physically close to the actors. In many cases throughout the film, the shaking is distracting and draws attention to itself rather than being immersive."

Jericho Tadeo of The Asian Cut wrote, after the film’s premiere at Inside Out, that it memorializes the director and is deeply shaped by grief, both within its story and in its wider context. According to Tadeo, it resists the usual separation between film and reality, becoming more affecting when viewed alongside the real-world events connected to its production and reception.
