= Agent of Happiness =

- Theatrical release poster
- Directed by: Arun Bhattarai; Dorottya Zurbó
- Produced by: Noémi Veronika Szakonyi; Máté Artur Vincze; Arun Bhattarai
- Starring: Amber Kumar Gurung; Guna Raj Kuikel
- Cinematography: Arun Bhattarai; Dorottya Zurbó
- Edited by: Péter Sass
- Music by: Ádám Balázs
- Production companies: Match Frame Productions (Hungary); Sound Pictures (Bhutan)
- Release date: January 19, 2024 (Sundance)
- Running time: 94 minutes
- Countries: Bhutan; Hungary
- Languages: Dzongkha, Nepali, English

Agent of Happiness is a 2024 documentary film directed by Arun Bhattarai and Dorottya Zurbó, and produced by Noémi Veronika Szakonyi, Máté Artur Vincze, and Arun Bhattarai. It follows Bhutanese government officials, Amber Kumar Gurung and Guna Raj Kuikel, as they travel through the country to measure people's happiness levels, which are then used to calculate the Gross National Happiness score.

It had its world premiere at the 2024 Sundance Film Festival where it was nominated for the Grand Jury Prize in the World Cinema Documentary category. The film won the Best Non-Fiction Film Award at the 2nd Eikhoigi Imphal International Film Festival 2025.

== Premise ==
The film follows Amber Kumar Gurung and Guna Raj Kuikel, two Bhutanese bureaucrats, in their travels through the small Himalayan kingdom as census workers, measuring people's happiness levels. They work for the Center for Gross National Happiness, a government institution which is tasked with collecting data on the citizens' happiness. This data is then used to inform the constitutionally-mandated goal of increasing national happiness.

Along the way, viewers meet Bhutan's everyday people, such as a transgender bar singer, a wealthy farmer and his three wives, a teenage girl who worries about her mother's alcoholism, or a recent widower who finds solace in religion. Through them we get a glimpse into Bhutanese society and their views on happiness in face of adversity. Viewers also explore Amber's dreams and ambitions, primarily among them the dream of finding love.

== Production ==
The film was produced by the Hungarian Match Frame Productions and co-produced by the Bhutanese Sound Pictures. It received funding from the Hungarian National Film Institute.

== Release ==
It had its world premiere at the 2024 Sundance Film Festival on January 19, 2024. It was selected for the MAMI Mumbai Film Festival 2024, where it competed in the South Asia Competition and received a special mention from the NETPAC jury.

== Reception ==
On review aggregator website Rotten Tomatoes, the film holds an approval rating of 95% based on 22 reviews, with an average rating of 7.0/10.
