= Fortune Teller (2009 film) =

Chinese documentary film directed by Xu Tong

Fortune Teller (Chinese: 《算命》) is an independent Chinese documentary film released in 2009, directed by Xu Tong. It primarily focuses on the everyday life of Li Baicheng, a disabled Chinese fortune teller with chronic leg weakness, and his wife, Pearl Shi, a woman living with hearing loss, aphasia and intellectual disability.

== Plot ==
Li Baicheng (Chinese: 厉百程), a disabled Chinese male who was born in 1965 at Qinglong Manchu Autonomous County, Hebei, People's Republic of China, serves as a Chinese fortune teller, as a number of disabled people received a limited education and have no other way to make a life. He met Pearl Shi (Chinese: 石珍珠) in his 40s, a female who has multiple disabilities, including hearing loss, aphasia, and intellectual disability. The film documents their daily lives, including their travels, fortune-telling for prostitutes, buying Fulus, and other daily activities.

== Reception and legacy ==
As the film reflects the daily life of Chinese disabilities, it received many prizes. In 2009, the film was awarded the 6th Annual China Independent Film Festival (CIFF) - Top Ten Documentaries of the Year. In 2010, it won the Network for the Promotion of Asian Cinema Award and was the first runner-up in the feature film category at the Hong Kong Chinese Language Documentary Festival. In 2011, the film was awarded the 2011 China Independent Film Festival "Real People Award" for depicting the life of Tang Xiaoyan (a female hooker in the documentary) as extensively as Old Tang Tau.

Fortune Teller, together with Wheat Harvest and Old Tang Tau, was named Xu Tong's "Vagabonds Trilogy of documentary films". Several articles note the focus on poor people in China within the film. The New York Times states that the movie "looks sympathetically at a vanishing folk tradition".

Tang Xiaoyan, the prostitute who appears in the film, had been raped at the age of 17. Fortune Teller might have changed her life to some extent, as she later joined Xu Tong's team and even became a producer for the team.
