= Asghar Yusifinejad =

Iranian film director and writer (1969–2022)

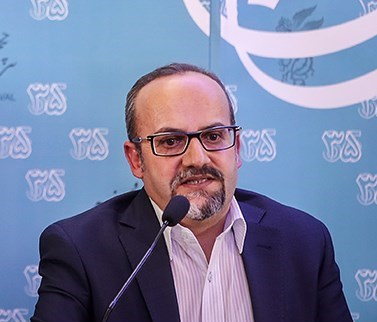
Asghar Yousefinejad in 2017

Asghar Yusifinejad was a director, screenwriter and film critic from Tabriz, is renowned for his films Ev (Home) and Qolçaq (Collar) shot in the Azerbaijani language.

His film Ev became the first Azerbaijani-language film to participate in the Fajr International Film Festival from 2004 to 2017. However, Qolçaq was not admitted to the Fajr International Film Festival due to being in the Azerbaijani language.

== About ==
Asgar Yusifinejad was born in Tabriz in 1969. He graduated from Tehran's Iran Broadcasting University. Since 1989, he was active as a director, writer and producer.

In September 2022, he was hospitalized due to a brain hemorrhage. He underwent surgery and died on September 13 due to a stroke. He was buried in the Vadi-e Rahmat Cemetery in Tabriz on September 14.

== Activity ==
In 2016, Asgar Yusifinejad directed the film "Ev" in Tabriz. From 2004 to 2017, the film "House" was the first film made in the Azerbaijani language to participate in the "Fajr International Film Festival". The film, shown with Persian subtitles, won the NETPAC award and the Simurgh Zarrin and Simin awards for best screenplay and best film at the 35th Fajr International Film Festival. The film was later awarded the "Special Prize of the Jury" at the "Transylvania International Film Festival" held in Romania in May 2018.

His 2020 film "Golchaq" was also shot in Azerbaijani in Tabriz. It was not accepted to the 40th "Fajr International Film Festival". Iranian film director Bahruz Afghami said that although the film "Golchaq" is an impressive film, it will not participate in the Fajr Festival because it is in Turkish. In April 2023, the creative team of the film "Golchak" was awarded at the 42nd "Istanbul Film Festival". The first showing of the film in the cinema took place in Turkey in 2023 after the director's death. On March 25, 2024, the film was shown in a cinema in Tabriz.
