= Sheng Zhimin =

Chinese filmmaker from Beijing (born 1969)

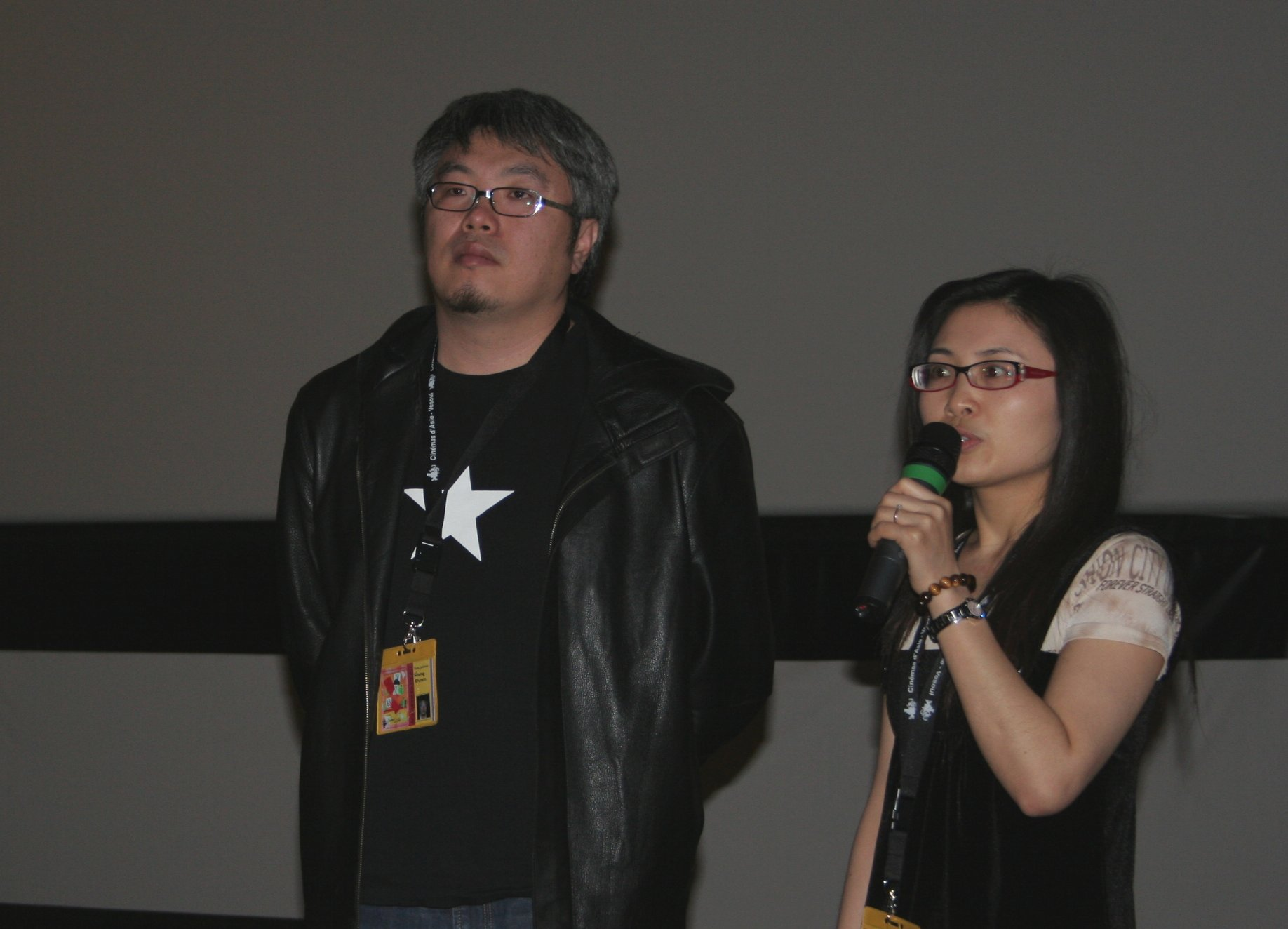
- Director Sheng Zhimin (left) at a film festival in Vesoul
- Born: 1969 (age 55–56); Beijing, China
- Occupation(s): Film director, Screenwriter, Line producer
- Awards: NETPAC Award (Locarno); 2006 Bliss; Shanghai New Talent Best Picture; 2007 Bliss

Sheng Zhimin (born 1969) is a Chinese filmmaker from Beijing. Unlike other directors to emerge in recent years, Sheng has had no formal training. He instead began his career as a line producer, screenwriter, and assistant director for other filmmakers like Jia Zhangke, Fruit Chan and Zhang Yang. In these positions, Sheng worked on the films Spicy Love Soup, Durian Durian, Public Toilet, and Platform.

== Bliss ==
Sheng's first, and so far only directorial effort was 2006's Bliss, a family drama set in the central Chinese city of Chongqing.

Bliss premiered at the 2006 Locarno International Film Festival where it won the NETPAC award, and had its North American premiere at the 2006 Toronto International Film Festival. It also screened at the 2007 Shanghai International Film Festival, where it picked up a best picture prize for the New Talent side-competition.

== Influences ==
Sheng lists Martin Scorsese's Raging Bull and Edward Yang's Yi Yi as important influences in his directorial style. He also considers Jia Zhangke, Fruit Chan, and Yasujirō Ozu among his favorite filmmakers.
