= Bliss (2006 film) =

- Directed by: Sheng Zhimin
- Written by: Gu Zheng; Sheng Zhimin
- Produced by: Fruit Chan; Paul Cheng; Carl Chang
- Starring: He Xingquan; Guan Jiangge; Xu Tao; Liao Zhong; Wang Lan; He Qin
- Cinematography: Wang Junbo
- Edited by: Kong Jinglei
- Music by: Zhao Li
- Distributed by: Golden Network Asia
- Release date: August 10, 2006 (Locarno)
- Running time: 96 minutes
- Language: Mandarin

Bliss (Chinese: 浮生; pinyin: Fú shēng; lit. 'Floating Lives') is a 2006 Chinese family drama film directed by Sheng Zhimin and produced by Hong Kong director Fruit Chan. The film was Sheng's first as a director, having previously served as a line producer for Chan and Jia Zhangke on films such as Durian Durian and Platform.

Though primarily a mainland production, the film was financed in part by the Hong Kong–based See Movie Ltd. and was distributed by Hong Kong's Golden Network Asia.

== Cast ==
- He Xingquan as Lao Li, a retired police officer living in Chongqing.
- Guan Jiangge as Xiu'e, Lao Li's second wife.
- Xu Tao as Xiaolei, Xiu'e's grown son from a previous marriage.
- Liao Zhong as Jianjun, Lao Li's cab-driving son from his first marriage.
- Wang Lan as Xiaohong, Jianjun's new wife.
- He Qin as Qian Xue, an out-of-towner who catches the eye of Xiaolei.

== Plot ==
Bliss tells the story of a modern and non-traditional family living in Chongqing. Lao Li (He Xingquan) is a once-divorced retired police officer, currently living with his second wife Zhang Xiu'e (Guan Jiangge). Lao Li's first wife ran off years ago, forcing him to raise his son, Jianjun alone.

Jianjun (Liao Zhong), now a grown man, has recently married Xiaohong (Wang Lan) and works long hours as a taxi driver. A passive man, Jianjun and Xiaohong's marriage is suffering from his long hours and her resentments. She eventually begins an affair and becomes pregnant, though the father remains a mystery. Jianjun announces that the baby will be born when Xiaohong discovers that her condition was actually a false pregnancy, and that she has actually been diagnosed with uterine cancer.

Meanwhile, Xiu'e's son from a previous marriage, the delinquent Xiaolei (Xu Tao) has begun to run with local hoodlums, much to the consternation of his mother and stepfather. Lao Li steps in and gets Xiaolei a job on a trolley-car, where he becomes interested in the pretty coworker, Qian Xue (He Qin). Unfortunately Xiaolei seems unable to escape from his life of petty crime.

Into this drama, Lao Li receives an unexpected package, his first wife's ashes. Lao Li must now try to find a suitable burial place for the ashes, all while trying to keep his crumbling family together.

== Background ==
The story of Bliss, which spans many years, evolved from an idea Sheng Zhimin developed while searching with his father for a proper burial place for his late mother. The experience of searching various graveyards throughout Beijing inspired Sheng to make a film "that spans from one's youth to their old age and it would be about life, youth and humanity."

Filming took place in the central Chinese city of Chongqing, where the city's seemingly constant fog and mist initially caused delays and problems to the production. Despite these problems, the mist would become one of the film's overriding themes.

== Reception ==
Relatively little seen, the few critics who did manage to see the film at a film festival were kind to Sheng's debut work, seeing its depressing and misty story as a vehicle for the characters to express something broader about Chinese society. Though depressing, these critics nevertheless saw the film as an honest portrayal of modern Chinese "struggling to get by, with terribly little, materially or spiritually." An exception was Variety critic Derek Elley, who saw the film's downbeat atmosphere as essentially a "remote intellectual exercise."

Many of these western reviews placed Sheng Zhimin's Bliss very much along the lines of other sixth generation filmmakers. In particular, the film was seen to reflect Jia Zhangke's Still Life for its realistic portrayal of modern life in China.

Bliss premiered at the 2006 Locarno International Film Festival where it won the NETPAC award, and had its North American premiere at the 2006 Toronto International Film Festival. It also screened at the 2007 Shanghai International Film Festival, where it picked up a best picture prize for the New Talent side-competition.
