= Hungry Ghost Diner =

2023 Malaysian comedy drama film

Chinese name
- Traditional Chinese: 餓鬼食堂
- Simplified Chinese: 饿鬼食堂
- Literal meaning: hungry ghost canteen
Transcriptions
Standard Mandarin
- Hanyu Pinyin: è guǐ shítáng
Yue: Cantonese
- Jyutping: ngo6 gwai2 sik6 tong4
- Directed by: Cho We Jun
- Written by: Cho We Jun
- Produced by: Lim Benji, Lee Yve Vonn
- Starring: Chen Keat Yoke; Eric Chen; Sam Chong; Chen Puie Heng; Fabian Loo
- Cinematography: Tan Teck Zee
- Edited by: Teh Rou Ning
- Music by: Teoh Eng Hooi
- Production company: Kinovisuals
- Release date: 2023
- Country: Malaysia
- Languages: Cantonese; Hakka; Malay

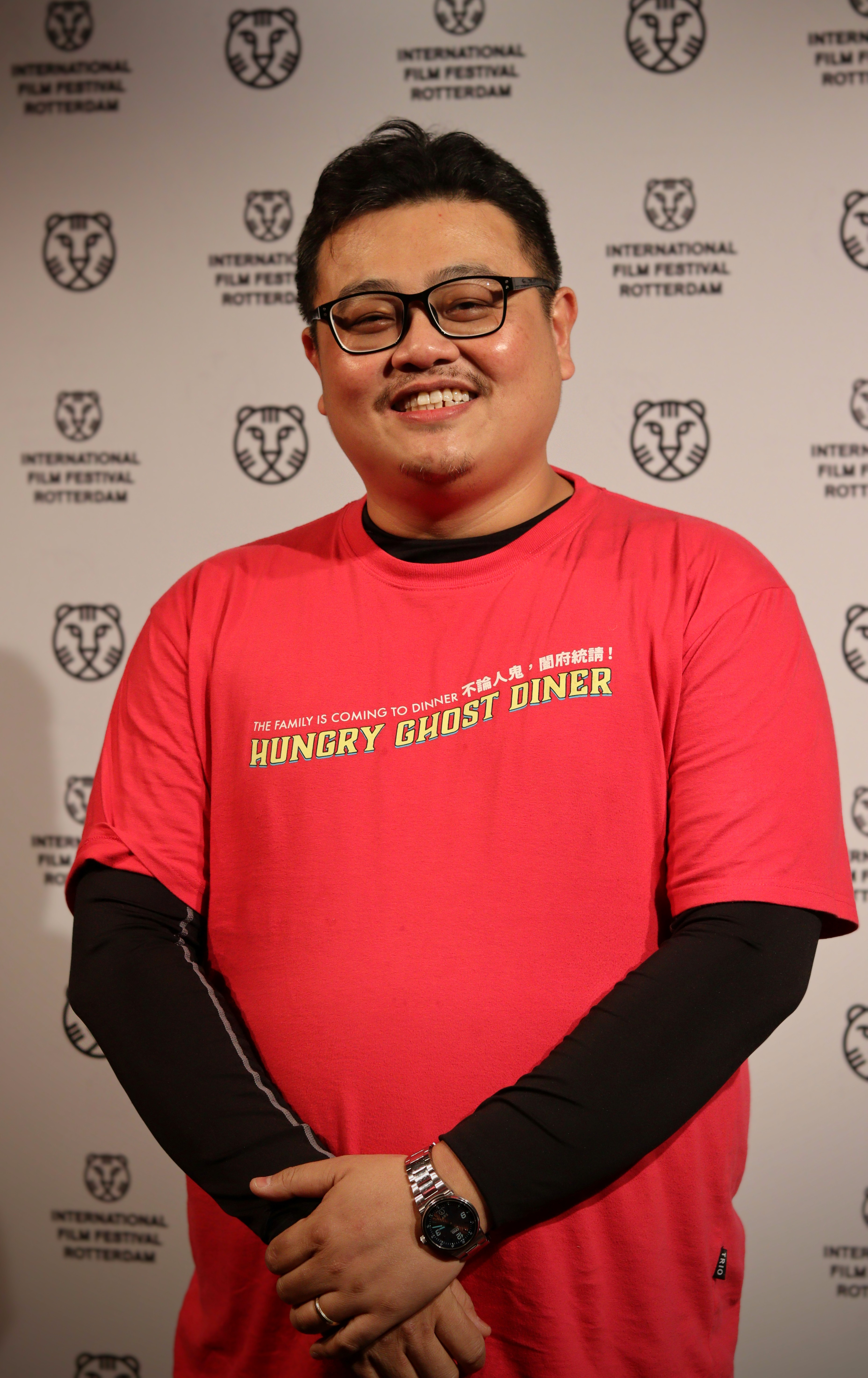
Cho We Jun at the 53rd International Film Festival Rotterdam

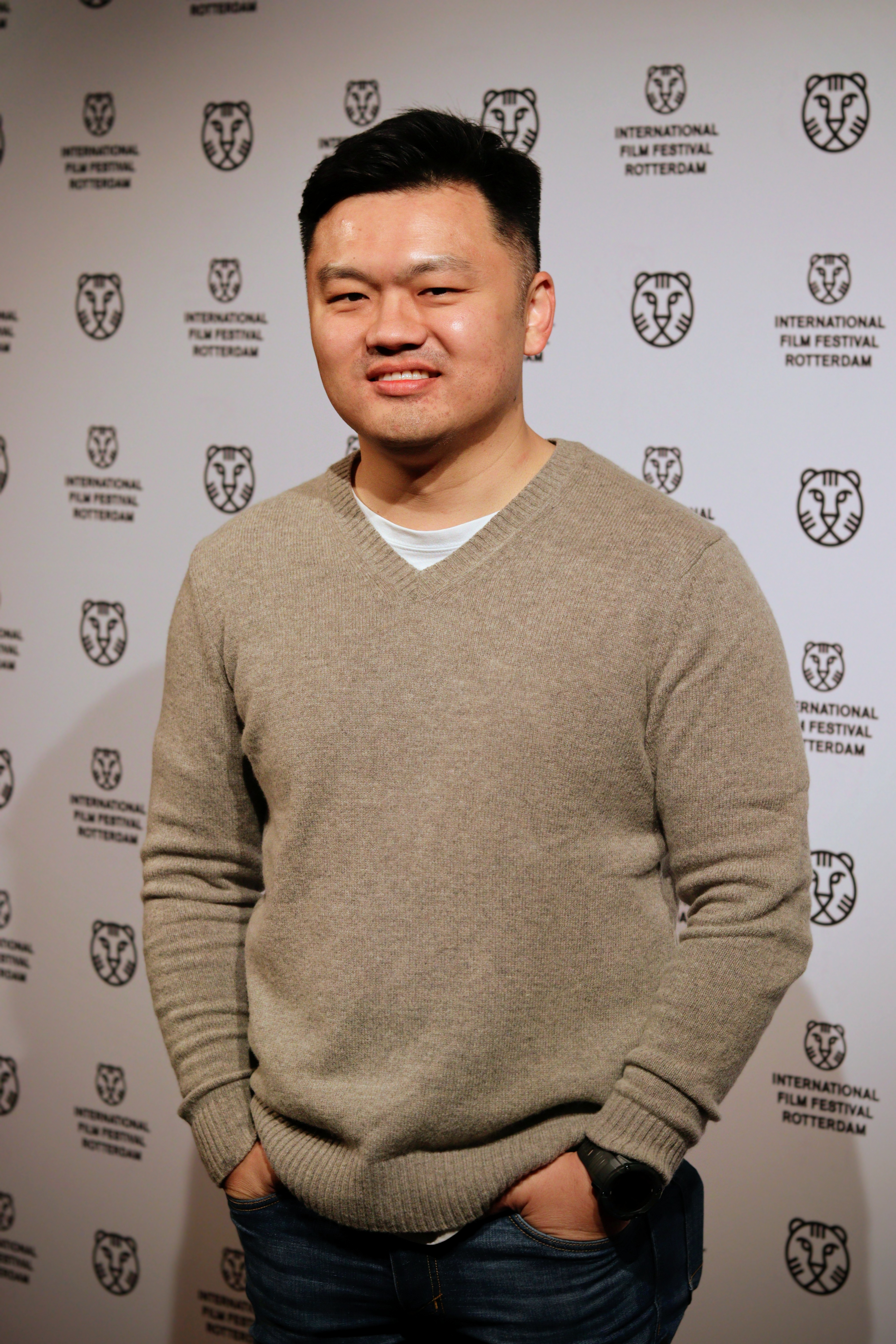
Benji Lim at the 53rd International Film Festival Rotterdam

Hungry Ghost Diner (Chinese: 饿鬼食堂) is a 2023 urban fantasy comedy drama film written and directed by Cho We Jun, and starring Chen Keat Yoke as a food truck operator who discovers that her family's coffee shop in Behrang Stesen is haunted with ghosts of her dead relatives returning for the Hungry Ghost Festival, after she is stranded there during a COVID-19 Lockdown. It is director Cho's debut feature film.

Hungry Ghost Diner premiered in the Merry-Go-Round section of the 27th Bucheon International Fantastic Film Festival on 30 June 2023, and was subsequently awarded the NETPAC Award for the best Asian feature film.
