= Liu Hao (director) =

Chinese filmmaker (born 1968)

- Born: 1968 (age 57–58); Shanghai, China
- Occupation: Film director
- Years active: 2000s
- Awards: 2002 Berlin International Film Festival: PREMIER First Movie Award - Special Mention; NETPAC Award

Chinese name
- Traditional Chinese: 劉浩
- Simplified Chinese: 刘浩
Transcriptions
Standard Mandarin
- Hanyu Pinyin: Líu Hào

Liu Hao (simplified Chinese: 刘浩; traditional Chinese: 劉浩; pinyin: Líu Hào; born 1968 in Shanghai) is a Chinese filmmaker. He first rose to prominence in the early to mid-2000s.

== Early life ==
Born and raised in Shanghai, Liu Hao spent much of his youth watching films by Ren Xudong and Cheng Yin and, as he grew older, the works of the fifth generation directors. In 1995, as his interest in film grew, Liu, now in his mid-20s, decided to apply to the Beijing Film Academy. Though his application was accepted, the Academy refused to allow him to start, stating that 27 was simply too old. Undeterred, Liu raised ¥25,000 from banks to make a short Beijing Opera music video which went on to win a prize in Shanghai. With his name on the map, Liu was allowed to enter the 1997 incoming class of the Beijing Film Academy.

== Directorial career ==
After graduating, Liu started his career with the independent film, Chen Mo and Meiting (2002). The film, about a romance between flower-vendor boy and a massage parlor girl, was never released in China. It nevertheless was screened abroad, and won a special mention at the Berlin International Film Festival and a NETPAC award.

Though never released in China, the film caught the attention of Chinese producers at the China Film Group (CFG), who selected Liu to participate in the New Film Project, a joint investment by the CFG and the Peking University Kwans Group to fund new directors. With expectations that the film would be not only critically, but more importantly commercially successful, the China Film Group and the Peking University Kwans Group invested ¥5 million to Liu for his project, Two Great Sheep, a rural comedy about a poor peasant couple being forced to take care of two sheep of a superior breed.

Two Great Sheep marked Liu as one of several Chinese "underground" directors who have now made films with China's state studios, a group that also included sixth generation directors Jia Zhangke and Zhu Wen.

== Filmography ==
Year	English Title	Chinese Title	Notes
2002	Chen Mo and Meiting	陈默和美婷	PREMIER First Movie Award - Special Mention at the 2002 Berlin International Film Festival
2004	Two Great Sheep	好大一对羊	
2010	Addicted to Love		Won three awards in the 17th Vesoul International Film Festival of Asian Cinema, including the Golden Cyclo Award.
2015	Back to the North		
2018	The Poet	诗人	
