= Two Great Sheep =

- Directed by: Liu Hao
- Written by: Liu Hao; Xia Tianmin (story)
- Produced by: Yang Buting; Wang Xinping
- Starring: Sun Yunkun; Jiang Zhikun
- Cinematography: Li Bingqiang
- Edited by: Qiao Jinglin; Liu Hao
- Music by: Xu Zhitong
- Distributed by: Beijing Starlight International
- Release date: 14 September 2004 (Toronto)
- Running time: 100 mins.
- Country: People's Republic of China
- Language: Mandarin

Two Great Sheep (simplified Chinese: 好大一对羊; traditional Chinese: 好大一對羊; pinyin: Hǎo dà yī dùi yáng) is a 2004 satirical Chinese film directed by Liu Hao and cast primarily with unknown actors.

Two Great Sheep tells the gentle story of a peasant couple, played by Sun Yunkun and Jiang Zhikun, who are charged with caring for two foreign sheep that they must somehow breed for the community.

Liu's second film and the first under government approval, Two Great Sheep can be located as part of a broader trend of independent Chinese filmmakers switching their focuses to state-approved productions during the early years of the 21st century. Besides Liu, these years saw many of the leading figures of the "sixth-generation" turning in their first SARFT-approved productions, including Jia Zhangke (2004's The World), Zhu Wen (2004's South of the Clouds), and Wang Xiaoshuai (2005's Shanghai Dreams).

Two Great Sheep premiered at the 2004 Toronto International Film Festival on September 14, 2004.

== Plot ==
The film follows a peasant couple, Zhao Deshan (Sun Yunkun) and his wife Xiuzhi (Jiang Zhikun), living in rural Yunnan province near Zhaotong in southern China. Their lives are thrown into upheaval when the local mayor (Chen Dajiang) "rewards" them with two foreign sheep donated by a former villager, now an official in Beijing. The couple is then tasked with breeding the sheep for their wool and to bring prosperity to their small community. Much to their chagrin, the sheep do not take to their new environment and the couple are forced into ever more ingenious ways of making the sheep appear greater than they really are. As they do so, they also come to value the sheep as companions in their family. When it becomes clear that the two "great" sheep are not the boon they were thought to be, the local authorities repossess the animals. Only now the simply peasant couple no longer wish to give them up.

== Cast ==
- Sun Yunkun as Zhao Deshan, a simple peasant farmer living in rural Yunnan who is tasked with caring with the eponymous sheep.
- Jiang Zhikun as Xiuzhi, his wife.
- Chen Dajiang as the mayor of Deshan and Xiuzhi's home village.
- Zhao Shengling as Liu, the provincial governor.

== Production ==
A graduate of the Beijing Film Academy, Liu started his career with the independent film, Chen Mo and Meiting (2002). Though never released in China, the film caught the attention of Chinese producers at the China Film Group (CFG), who selected Liu to participate in the New Film Project, a joint investment by the CFG and the Peking University-Kwans Group to fund new directors. With expectations that the film would be not only critically, but more importantly commercially successful, the China Film Group invested ¥5 million to Liu for his next project, Two Great Sheep.

The "New Film Project" would in turn give way to Beijing Starlight International, a new company focused on independent filmmakers which was also responsible for the film's international distribution and sales.

Shot primarily in the southern province of Yunnan, Two Great Sheep was also produced in part by the Yunnan Provincial Association for External Cultural Exchange.

== Reception ==
The New York Times critic Stephen Holden aptly summed up the two ways of viewing Two Great Sheep: as either "an uplifting fable about teamwork and good citizenship or as a spoof of a frightened society's blind obedience to authority."

Steve Rhodes espoused the latter view in his review of the film, seeing Two Great Sheep as a "simple film, simply told."

Many critics, however, chose a middle view, and saw the film primarily as a metaphor for China's bureaucratic machine and its effect on the common peasant. Derek Elley of Variety noted how the film "homes in on the stratified nature of Chinese rural society," though he does not go as far as to suggest what Liu Hao intended with the film. Elley does argue, however, that the film is distinct from similar films, notably Zhang Yimou's 1992 The Story of Qiu Ju, mainly in that Two Great Sheep there is a "lack of bitterness or despair." A similar review noted that the film was nothing if not a celebration of the "tenacious resiliency of the will to survive."

Other critics took a negative view and saw the film's lack of bitterness or other strong "message" as a flaw. Slant Magazine's Ed Gonzalez felt the film went on too long without a clear message, holding that he was "not exactly sure if Hao is for or against Bolshevism."
