= Arun Bhattarai =

Bhatanese filmmaker

- Born: 1985 (age 40–41)
- Education: DocNomads
- Occupation: Filmmaker

Arun Bhattarai (born 1985, Thimphu, Bhutan) is a Bhutanese documentary filmmaker. He is known for directing The Next Guardian, Mountain Man, and Agent of Happiness. He is one of the few independent documentary directors working in Bhutan and a member of the Academy of Motion Picture Arts and Sciences.

He has been collaborating with Hungarian filmmaker Dorottya Zurbó since they met while studying at the DocNomads Joint Master’s Program in Europe. He is the founder of production company Sound Pictures.

== Career ==
Bhattarai was born in Thimphu, Bhutan, in 1985. He graduated from the first edition of Docnomads Joint Masters for which he was awarded a full Erasmus Mundus scholarship in Lisbon, Budapest and Brussels in 2014. Bhattarai began his career as a television director for youth documentaries and television programs at the Bhutan Broadcasting Service, where he worked for five years.

In 2017, his debut feature film, The Next Guardian, co-directed with Dorottya Zurbó, had its world premiere at International Documentary Film Festival Amsterdam (IDFA). The film followed a small Bhutanese family at crossroads due to contrasting dreams of two generations. It screened at numerous film festivals including True/False Film Fest, Zsigmond Vilmos Film Festival, where it won Best Documentary Award, the Museum of Modern Art (MoMA), and the San Francisco International Film Festival amongst others

In 2019, Bhattarai's upcoming short documentary, Mountain Man, exploring the life of Bhutan’s only glaciologist who is attempting to measure climate change in the Himalayas, won the Best Pitch Prize at the If/Then Global Short Pitch. In November 2021, he received an International Documentary Association (IDA) grant for Mountain Man through its IDA+XRM Media Incubator program. The following month, his one-minute film Snow Lion and The Glaciologis, won Best Documentary at the International Mobile Film Festival in Paris, receiving a production grant to support the editing of Mountain Man. In 2022, he premiered Mountain Man at International Documentary Film Festival Amsterdam (IDFA). In 2023, the film was screened at festivals including Doc Edge, Chicago International Film Festival, where it received a Special Mention, and Doc NYC, where it won the Grand Jury Prize.

In 2024, Bhattarai's second feature film, Agent of Happiness, co-directed with Dorottya Zurbó, premiered in the World Cinema Documentary Competition at the 2024 Sundance Film Festival, marking the first time a Bhutanese film had its world premiere at the festival. The film received support from numerous labs and funding institutions throughout its development and post-production, including the National Film Institute - Hungary, Sundance Institute, Catapult Film Fund, deNovo Initiative, DMZ Docs Fund and dok.incubator INT workshop. Bhattarai described it as the most challenging film he and Zurbó have worked on, noting the complexity of constructing a multicharacter narrative where multiple interconnected stories had to be woven together into a cohesive structure. It screened at numerous film festivals including CPH:DOX, Hot Docs, DocsBarcelona, True/False Film Fest, Seattle International Film Festival, and San Francisco International Film Festival, where it won the Audience Award, amongst others. It was also nominated for the International Documentary Association (IDA) awards.

=== Jury and mentorship ===
In 2024, Bhattarai served as a jury member for the Documentary Australia Award at the Sydney Film Festival. He was also part of the Short Competition jury at the Moscow International Documentary Film Festival.

In 2025, he served as a mentor at the inaugural Kathmandu Doc Lab, where he conducted workshops and mentored emerging documentary filmmakers.

== Filmography ==
Year	Film	Director	Cinematographer	Producer	Writer	Note	Ref.
2017	The Next Guardian	Yes	Yes	Yes	Yes		
2022	Mountain Man	Yes	Yes	Yes	Yes	Short	
2023	Silent Walls	No	Yes	No	No	Short	
2025	Agent of Happiness	Yes	Yes	Yes	Yes		
