= The Real Sister =

- Theatrical release poster
- Directed by: Khương Ngọc
- Written by: Kim Chan; Toto Chan
- Produced by: Bao Quyen Pham
- Starring: Viet Huong; Hong Dao; Ngoc Trinh; Le Khanh; Dinh Y Nhung
- Production company: LiveOn
- Distributed by: CJ HK Entertainment
- Release date: 20 December 2024 (Vietnam)
- Country: Vietnam
- Language: Vietnamese

The Real Sister is a 2024 Vietnamese comedy drama film directed by Khương Ngọc and stars Viet Huong, Hong Dao, Ngoc Trinh, Le Khanh and Dinh Y Nhung.

== Premise ==
During a family reunion of a terminally ill sister-in-law with her four younger sisters, deep tensions emerge.

== Cast ==
- Viet Huong
- Hong Dao
- Ngoc Trinh
- Le Khanh
- Dinh Y Nhung

== Release ==
The film was released in Vietnam in December 2024 and became a hit, "raked in $4.4 million from 1.3 million admissions, landing among Vietnam’s top five highest-grossing domestic films of 2024", reported Variety.

== Reception ==
A review at Asian Movie Pulse concluded that the film was "not high art, but is definitely well-directed, acted and casted, while has enough substance to satisfy fans that want their mainstream movies a bit more layered."
