= In Deep Sleep =

- Directed by: Mariya Ignatenko
- Written by: Mariya Ignatenko
- Produced by: Katerina Mikhaylova; Kosntantin Fam; Lyudmila Duplyakina
- Starring: Vadik Korolyov; Dmitry Kubasov; Lyudmila Duplyakina; Vasilisa Zemskova; Timofey Dashuk; Galina Lebedinets
- Cinematography: Veronika Solovyova
- Music by: Roman Kurochkin
- Production company: Vega Film
- Release date: February 21, 2020
- Country: Russia
- Language: Russian

In Deep Sleep (Russian: Город уснул) is a 2020 Russian drama film directed by Mariya Ignatenko. The film is a participant of Kinotavr-2020 and the Forum program of the Berlin International Film Festival.

== Plot ==
Victor's wife suddenly dies, causing his world to fall into a deep sleep and Victor decides to look for a man who does not sleep.

== Cast ==
- Vadik Korolyov as Viktor
- Dmitry Kubasov as Dmitry
- Lyudmila Duplyakina as Nika
- Vasilisa Zemskova
- Timofey Dashuk
- Galina Lebedinets
