= Pacific Meridian =

International film festival

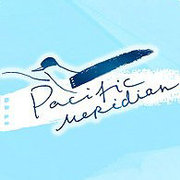

Pacific Meridian (Russian: Меридианы Тихого; abbreviated as IFFV) is an International Film Festival of the Asian-Pacific region, which has been held every September since 2003 in Vladivostok, Russia. Every year it brings together filmmakers from about 108 countries; with more than 1200 films submitted each year.

== Festival ==
International Film Festival Pacific Meridian is a competition of length and short films, a panorama of world cinema, a program of Russian films, shorts, documentaries and animated films, retrospectives of masters of world cinema, workshops, master classes, etc. One of the distinguishing features of the Film Festival is a specialization of the IFF Pacific Meridian on the films of Asian-Pacific region.

International Film Festival of countries of Asian-Pacific region Pacific Meridian in Vladivostok was organized in 2003. The film festival is held annually in September by the Ministry of Culture of Russian Federation and Primorsky Region Territory Administration.

== Features of the festival ==
- Each year the Yul Brynner Award is presented by Rock Brynner to the most promising young actor or actress. Yul Brynner was born in Vladivostok.
- Film Festival Pacific Meridian is a cultural project where the exit film screenings and artistic encounters of Russian actors and directors with the inhabitants of Primorsky Krai pass.
- Since 2006, the festival runs the program, Screentest, which is addressed to first-time filmmakers.
- The sixth International Film Festival Pacific Meridian was a presentation of an international project Cinema train - an international master class for young filmmakers, which took place during the train Moscow-Vladivostok. Within two weeks, 18 participants from different European countries traveled throughout Russia, with stops in various cities across the country. During the trip they took six short documentary films on the theme Where is the border of Europe. Films were edited in Vladivostok and shown in a program of the IFF. After the world premiere of the film in Vladivostok it has been selected for display at the Cannes Film Festival program.
- Within the bounds of the sixth Pacific Meridian Film Festival from 14 to 17 September, an International Filmsammit Eurasia was held. The business program included round tables, seminars, business trainings and discussions on current topics in the field of cinema. It was a special event of the filmsammit Eurasia, organized jointly with the Vjugn Consult company Russian Co-production and Film Financing Forum, aimed at developing cooperation between Russian, European and Asian investors and financiers, producers, distributors, representatives of public funds financing the film industry.
- Together with Informkino company from 14 to 17 of September 2008 was held program Generation campus, which main objective in 2008 was to promote contribution of co-production debut project. The result was 3 short films shot by young filmmakers actors of Generation Campus, with Ingeborga Dapkunaite, Irina Bezrukova, Oksana Akinshina.

== Program ==
Competition screening includes:

- Features and shorts (up to 30 min)

Non-competition programs:

- Panorama
- Russian Cinema
- Special and Info screenings
- Retrospective screening of the World Cinema Masters
- Seminars and workshops

== Jury ==
To judge competition films there will be an International Jury formed of 5 persons. The Festival covers a round-trip ticket and other expenses for staying in Vladivostok for each International Jury member; the International Jury cannot include anyone involved in production or distribution of any film in the competition; at least one member of the International Jury has to be a film producer.

== Location ==
Film Festival takes place in Vladivostok, Russia on the basis of the cinema Ocean, Ussuri network Illusion, a summer site of Seven Feet yacht club.

== Participation ==
According to regulations

- Eligible are any films presented by film companies, film studios, independent producers, distributors or any other copyright owners of the films
- DVDs are to be shipped to the Festival Office for preliminary selection
- In the competitive program are accepted feature and short films on 35 мм, Betacam Digital, Betacam SP, HDCam, DCP with English subtitles, and finished by production no more than a year ago; it can include films that were screened before at other film festivals
- The competition program attended at least 12 films.
- All the professional media formats besides 16 mm are eligible for non-competition programs.

== The selection of films ==
The selection of films in order to participate in the IFF provides the selection committee. The final decision on the inclusion of film in one of the programs of the Festival takes the Directorate the IFF. Festival Management agrees to inform the participants of the festival about inclusion of the film in program of the Festival. Copies of the films in their original format, taken in the competitive and non-competitive programs must be received by the Directorate prior to the date indicated on the official festival website.
