= Vesoul International Film Festival of Asian Cinema =

Coordinates: 47.6231°N 6.1558°E

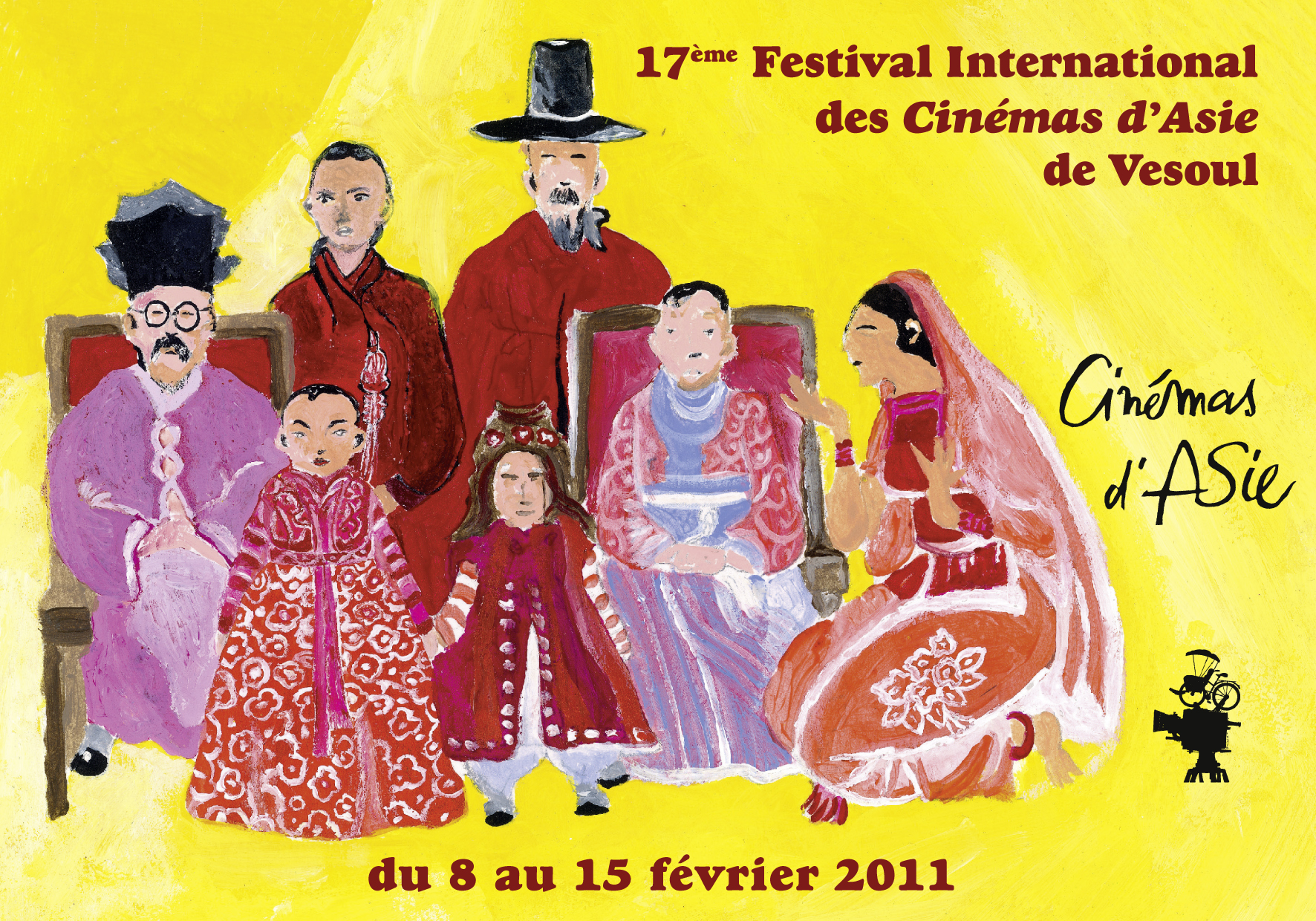
Promo poster of 17th edition held from 8 to 11 February 2011

The Vesoul International Film Festival of Asian Cinema (French: Festival international des cinémas d'Asie) is an annual special-interest film festival focusing on the cinemas of Asia. The festival is held annually in Vesoul, France. It was created in 1995 by Martine and Jean-Marc Thérouanne who have been codirecting the festival since then.

The highest award of the festival is the Golden Cyclo Award. Other awards include the Special Langues "O" Award, given by the French National Institute for Oriental Languages and Civilizations and the Emile Guimet Award by the Friends Association of National Museum of Asian Arts-Guimet at the festival.

In the 17th edition of the festival, which attracted an audience of 28,700, three awards were given to the Chinese film "Addicted to Love" by director Liu Hao. The film took out the top award as well as the "O" and Guimet awards. The Golden Cyclo was shared with "P.S.", by Uzbekistan director Elkin Tuychiev.

== Selected pictures ==
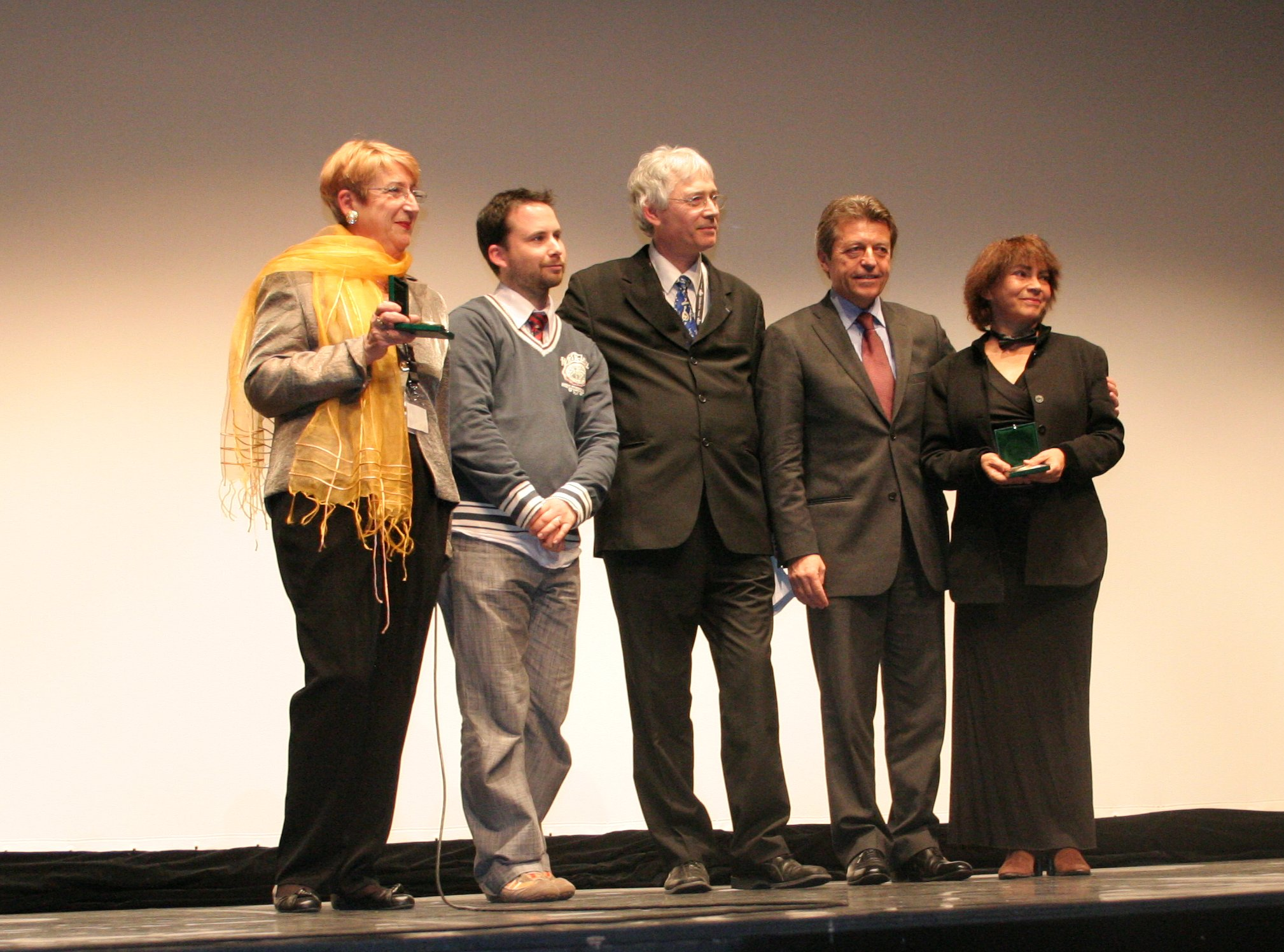
Martine Thérouanne (far left), Jean-Marc Thérouanne (center) and Jocelyne Saab (far right) awarded the Great Medal of Francophonie in 2009

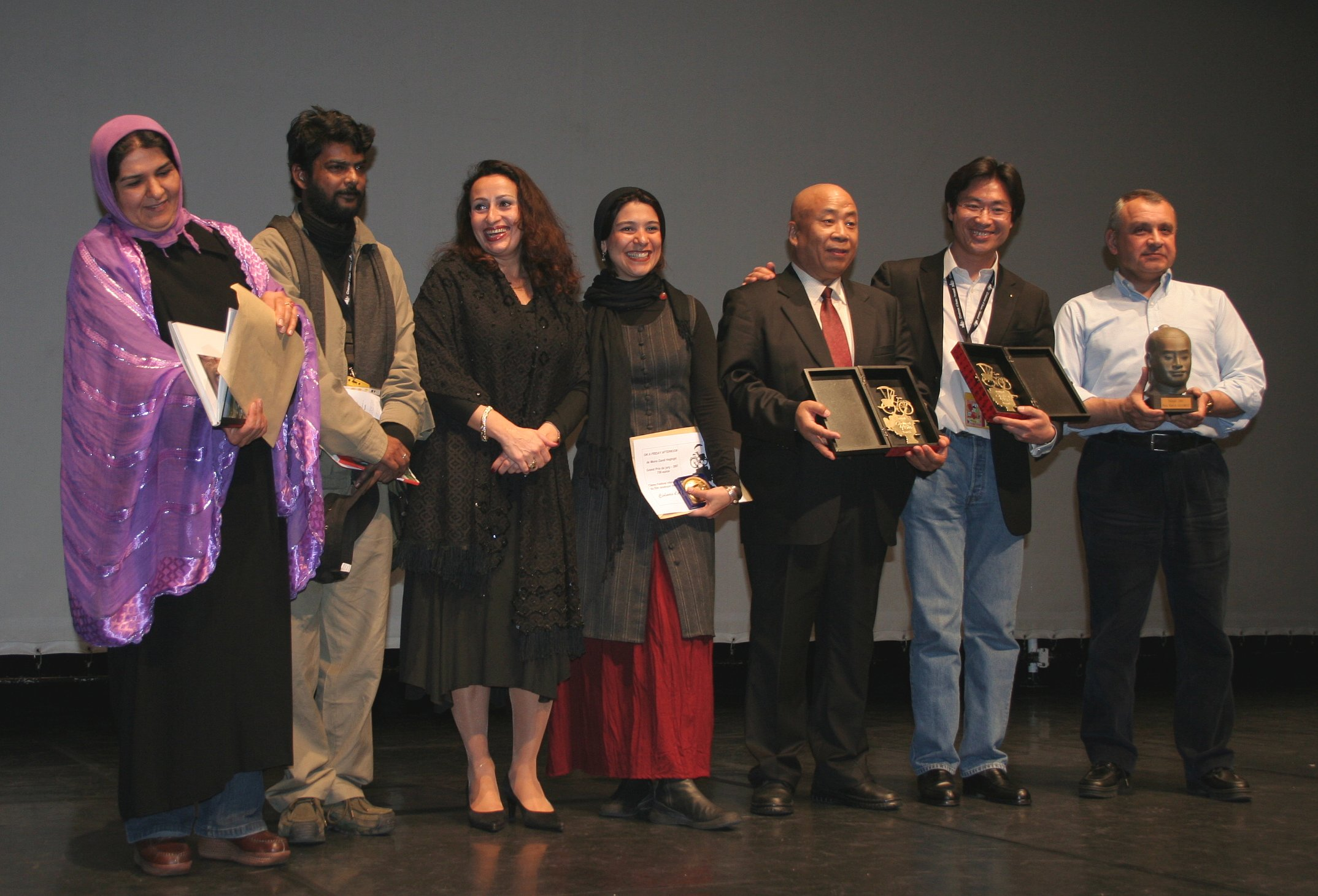
Bappaditya Bandopadhyay, Mona Zandi Haghighi, Wu Tianming, Dima Al-Joundi, Ensie Shah Hosseini (among others) were awarded in 2007

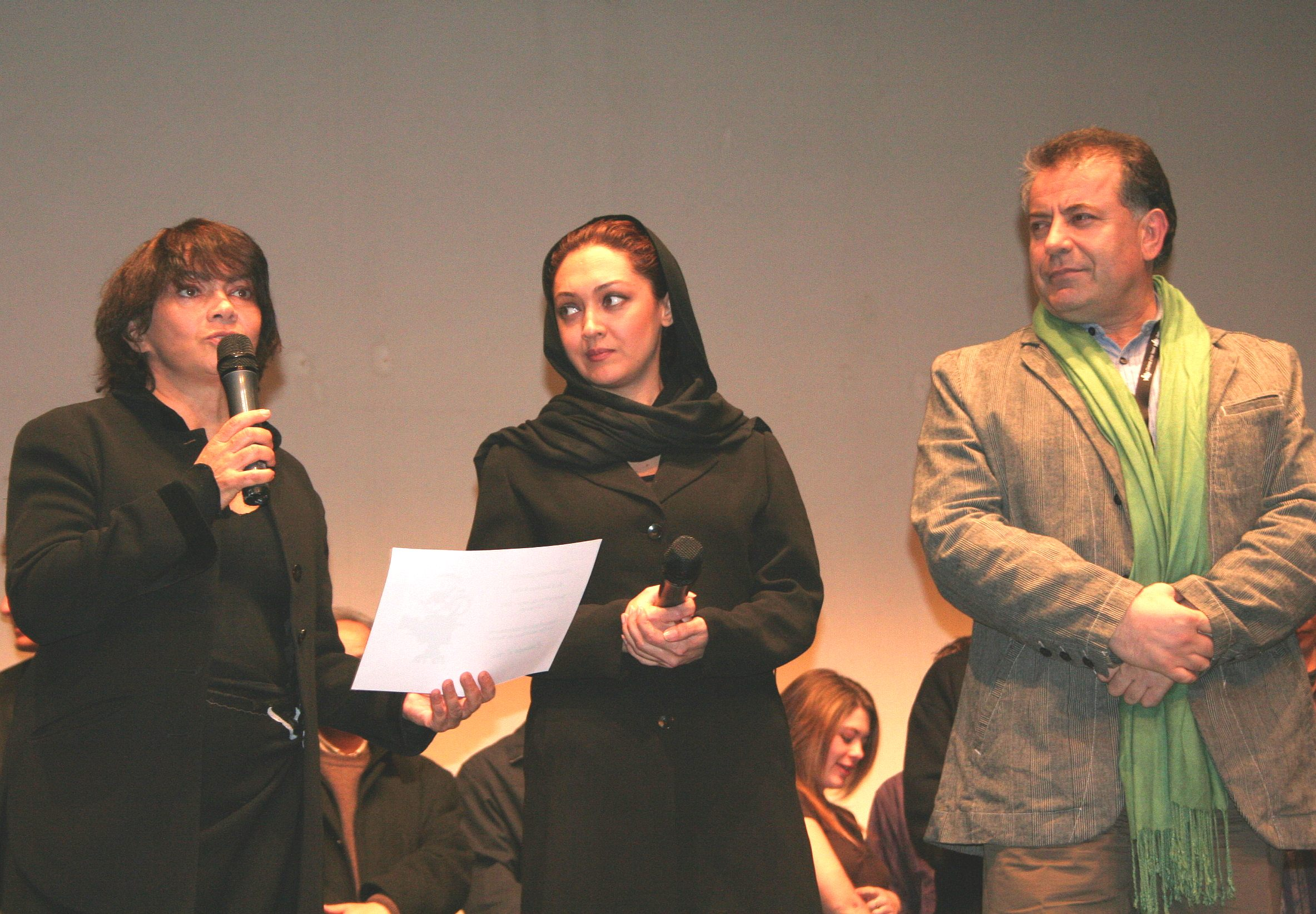
Jocelyne Saab, Niki Karimi and Safarbek Soliev, members of the 2008 jury

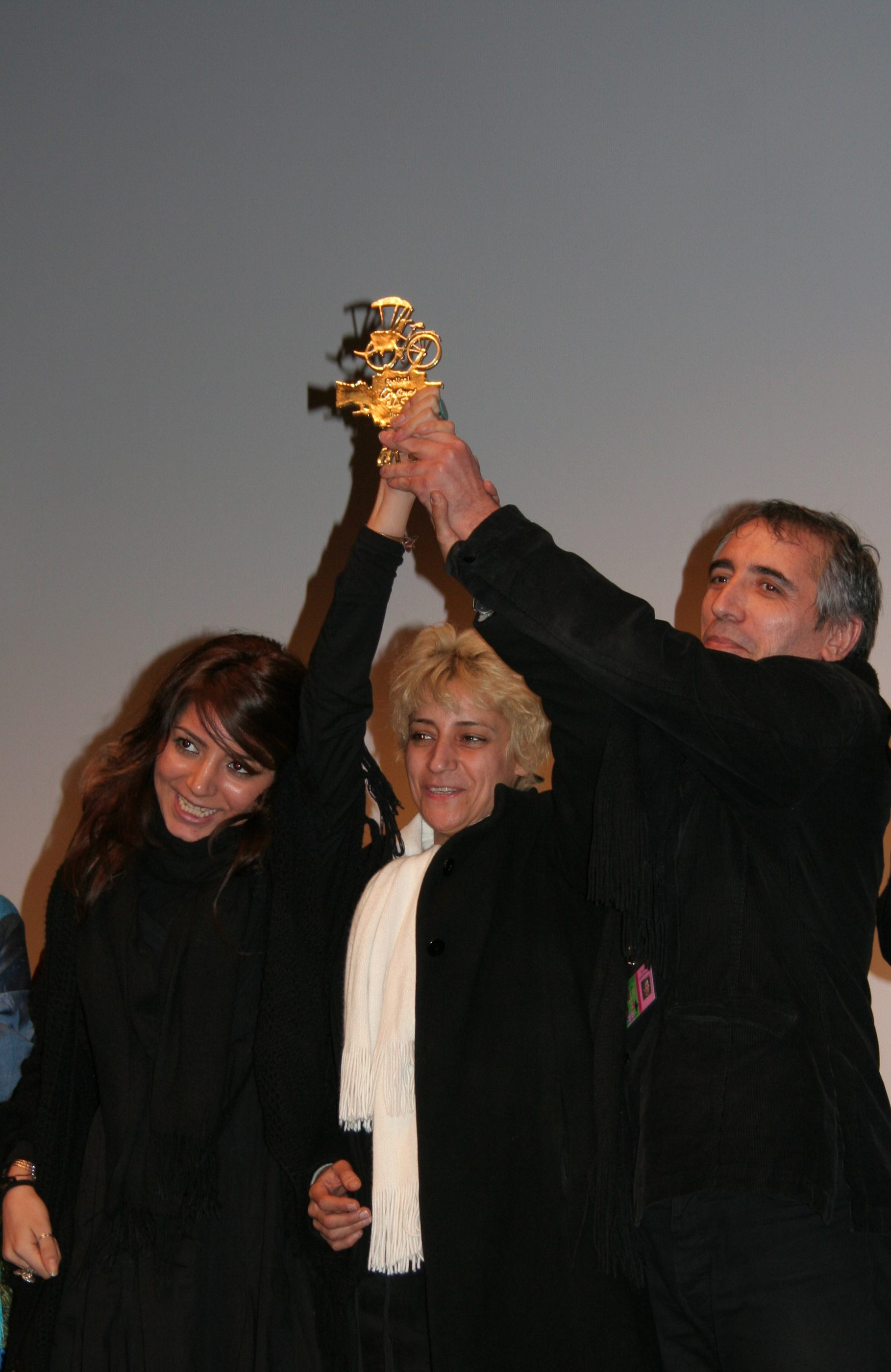
Hana Makhmalbaf, Marzieh Meshkini and Mohsen Makhmalbaf receiving the Cyclo d'or d'honneur in 2009

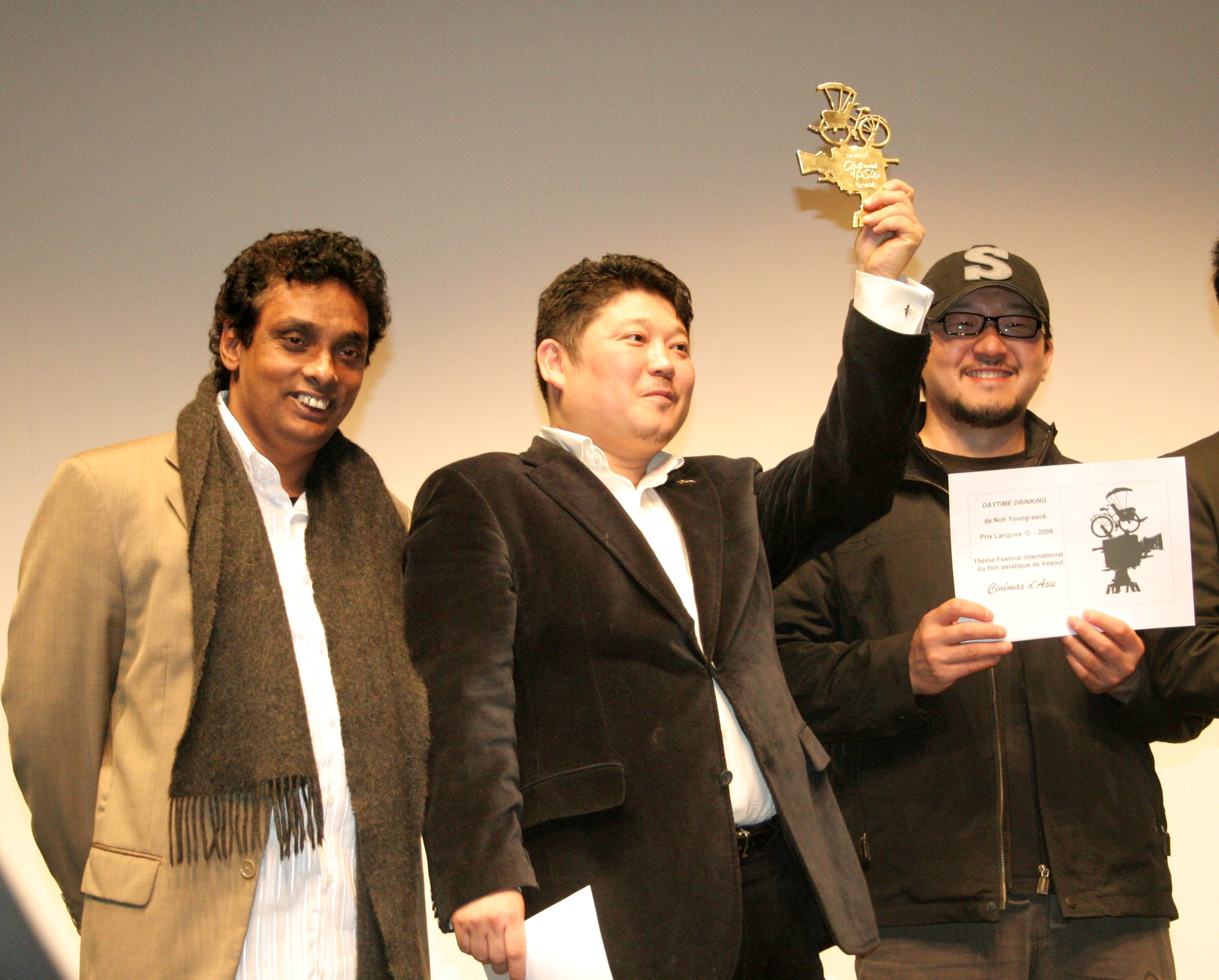
Prasanna Vithanage, Rustem Abdrashitov and Noh Young-seok receiving their award in 2009
