= Jatla Siddartha =

Indian filmmaker

- Occupation: Filmmaker
- Years active: 2012–
- Notable work: Love and Shukla (2017); In the Belly of a Tiger (2024).

Jatla Siddartha, also credited as Siddartha Jatla (sometimes spelt Siddhartha Jatla), is an Indian film director and cinematographer. He is known for his feature films Love and Shukla (2017) and In the Belly of a Tiger (2024).

== Early life and education ==
Siddartha Jatla was born and raised in India. His father was a film director, and his mother an actress. His father used to take him at the age of six to film clubs showing serious films by independent filmmakers, which he found boring. After seeing Jurassic Park, he wanted to be like Steven Spielberg, and he later admired the Chinese director Zhang Yimou. His mother encouraged him to study cinematography, but he always wanted to be a director.

He graduated in cinematography from the Film and Television Institute of India, after spending five and a half years there. He was then admitted to the cinematography program at the Asian Film Academy as part of cultural exchange program of the Busan Film Festival.

== Career ==
The filmmaker has been variously referred to as "Siddartha Jatla" "Siddhartha Jatla", and "Jatla Siddartha", but he appears to refer to himself in the latter way. (Note: Although most sources seem to suggest that Siddartha is more often used as a given name, and Jatla as surname, he refers to himself as Jatla Siddartha in an interview at the Berlinale, as does the official programme, his LinkedIn profile, and IMDb.)

Siddartha's first short film, The Artist, premiered at the Busan Film Festival in 2012.

He was cinematographer, director, co-producer, co-writer, and co-editor of his first feature film, Love and Shukla (originally titled Haanduk) which premiered at Busan in 2017. It screened at the Tallinn Black Nights Film Festival, Shanghai International Film Festival, and over 40 other international film festivals, before being sold to Netflix, where it was highly successful. Amanda Mooney co-wrote, co-produced, and co-edited the film.

His second feature film is In the Belly of a Tiger, which had its world premiere in the Forum section at the Berlin International Film Festival in February 2024, where it garnered excellent reviews. It also screened at the Adelaide Film Festival in October 2024, where it won the Feature Fiction Award. The film is co-written by Siddhartha and Amanda Mooney. While its cast consists mostly of non-professional actors, its technical crew features some big names in cinema, including Japanese composer Umebayashi Shigeru, sound designer Resul Pookutty (Slumdog Millionaire), and colour grading by the Chinese studio owned by director Wuershan. Siddhartha has said that the film is very personal to him, and that the main character (the son) represents his feelings. The idea for the plot came from what turned out to be a fabricated story about young people sending their parents into the forest to be killed by a tiger so that they could claim compensation, but this led him to do a lot of research into the poverty experienced by rural communities in India, and he wanted to make a film about social issues. The film came about after a US producer contacted him after seeing his first film on Netflix, and various other producers came on board from China, Taiwan, and Indonesia, so it became an international production.

In 2025, he also co-wrote and produced "Whisperings of the Moon", the debut film of mainland Chinese filmmaker Lai Yuqing, a co-production between India, Hongkong, mainland China and Cambodia. It screened at Busan International Film Festival 2025 in the Windows of Asian Cinema Section.

Jatla Siddartha is working on his third feature film, "If Ever You Shall be", a love story based in Cambodia and showing the Indian diaspora there. It is an India, Hongkong China, and Cambodia co-production.

== Recognition and awards ==
Awards received for his films include:

- 2017: NETPAC Award at the Jogja-NETPAC Asian Film Festival, for Love and Shukla
- 2017: SIGNIS Award, for Love and Shukla
- 2024: Feature Fiction Award " In the Belly of a Tiger" at Adelaide Film Festival
