= Nika Award for Best Film of the CIS and Baltic States =

Russian cinema award

- Country: Russia
- Presented by: Russian Academy of Cinema Arts and Science
- First award: 2003
- Currently held by: Shambala (2021)
- Website: Official site of the Russian Academy of Cinema Arts and Science

The Nika Award for Best Film of the CIS and Baltic States (Russian: Ника за лучший фильм стран СНГ и Балтии) is given annually by the Russian Academy of Cinema Arts and Science and presented at the Nika Awards.

In 2022, nominees were announced, but the Award ceremony was postponed and, eventually, cancelled.

The Award ceremony was also cancelled in 2023.

Nika Award for Best Film of the CIS and Baltic States was not presented in 2024 and 2025.

In the following lists, the titles and names in bold with a light blue background are the winners and recipients respectively; those not in bold are the nominees. The year with a light pink background is the one when nominees were announced, but the Award ceremony was not held.

== Winners and nominees ==
=== 2000s ===
Year	Winner and nominees	Original title	Country	Director	Ref(s)
**2003**	**Flashback**	**Flashback**	**Latvia**	**Herz Frank**	
2003	Documentarist	Vaveragrogh	Armenia	Harutyun Khachatryan	
2003	Leila's Prayer	Molitva Leyly	Kazakhstan	Satybaldy Narymbetov	
2003	Passengers from the Past	Пассажиры из прошлого столетия	Ukraine	Victor Olender	
2003	Comrade Boykenzhayev	Товарищ Бойкенжаев	Uzbekistan	Yusup Razykov	
**2004**	**Angel on the Right**	**Farishtai kitfi**	**Tajikistan**	**Jamshed Usmonov**	
2004	Keep Smiling!	Keep Smiling!	Latvia	Askolds Saulitis	
2004	Gold Rush	Золотая лихорадка	Ukraine	Mikhail Belikov	
2004	The Healer	Лекарь	Uzbekistan	Yusup Razykov	
2004	Somnambuul	Somnambuul	Estonia	Sulev Keedus	
**2005**	**The Hunter**	**Охотник**	**Kazakhstan**	**Serik Aprimov**	
2005	Boys in the Sky	Osmondagi bolalar	Uzbekistan	Zulfikar Musakov	
2005	Rebirth Island	Ostrov vozrozhdeniya	Kazakhstan	Rustem Abdrashev	
2005	Romeo And Juliet	Romeo un Džuljeta	Latvia	Viestur Kairish	
2005	Saratan	Saratan	Kyrgyzstan	Ernest Abdyjaparov	
**2006**	**Tbilisi-Tbilisi**	**Tbilisi-Tbilisi**	**Georgia**	**Levan Zakareishvili**	
2006	Erkak	Erkak	Uzbekistan	Yusup Razykov	
2006	Dangerously Free Man	Opasno Svobodniy Chelovek	Ukraine	Roman Shirman	
2006	A Trip to Karabakh	Gaseirneba Karabaghshi	Georgia	Levan Tutberidze	
2006	Seven Invisible Men	Septyni nematomi žmonės	Lithuania	Šarūnas Bartas	
**2007**	**Two in One**	**Dva v odnom**	**Ukraine**	**Kira Muratova**	
2007	Ghetto	Vilniaus getas	Lithuania	Audrius Juzenas	
2007	Notes on a Railway Inspector	Zapiski putevogo obkhodchika	Kazakhstan	Zhanabek Zhetiruov	
2007	Fed Up!	Kõrini!	Estonia	Peeter Simm	
2007	3 Girls	3 Girls	Azerbaijan	Murad Ibragimbekov	
**2008**	**The Russian Triangle**	**რუსული სამკუთხედი**	**Georgia**	**Aleko Tsabadze**	
2008	Monotony	Monotonija	Latvia	Juris Poskus	
2008	Autumn of the Magician	Autumn of the Magician	Armenia	Ruben Gevorkyants, Vahe Kevorkov	
2008	Pure Coolness	Boz Salkyn	Kyrgyzstan	Ernest Abdyjaparov	
2008	Swift	Strizh	Kazakhstan	Abai Kulbai	
2008	Whisper of Sin	Nuodemes uzkalbejimas	Lithuania	Algimantas Puipa	
**2009**	**Birds of Paradise**	**Райські птахи**	**Ukraine**	**Roman Balayan**	
2009	Unknown Route	Belgisiz marshrut	Kyrgyzstan	Temirbek Birnazarov	
2009	Autumn Ball	Sügisball	Estonia	Veiko Õunpuu	
2009	The Gift to Stalin	Podarok Stalinu	Kazakhstan	Rustem Abdrashev	
2009	Goodbye, Gulsary!	Қош бол, Гүлсары!	Kazakhstan	Ardak Amirkulov	

=== 2010s ===
Year	Winner and nominees	Original title	Country	Director	Ref(s)
**2010**	**Melody for a Street Organ**	**Melodiya dlya sharmanki**	**Ukraine**	**Kira Muratova**	
2010	The 40th Door	40-cı gapı	Azerbaijan	Elchin Musaoglu	
2010	The Other Bank	გაღმა ნაპირი	Georgia	Giorgi Ovashvili	
2010	Vortex	Duburys	Lithuania	Gytis Luksas	
2010	Songs from the Southern Seas	Песни южных морей	Kazakhstan	Marat Sarulu	
**2011**	**A Trap for the Ghost**	**Kabusun gözleri ile**	**Azerbaijan**	**Rustam Ibragimbekov**	
2011	Border	Sahman	Armenia	Harutyun Khachatryan	
2011	Family Instinct	Ģimenes lietas	Latvia	Andris Gauja	
2011	Eastern Drift	Eurazijos aborigenas	Lithuania	Šarūnas Bartas	
2011	The Light Thief	Svet-Ake	Kyrgyzstan	Aktan Abdykalykov	
**2012**	**Will There Be a Theatre Up There?!**	**Netavi ik teatri aris?!**	**Georgia**	**Nana Janelidze**	
2012	There Was Never a Better Brother	I ne bylo luchshe brata	Azerbaijan	Murad Ibragimbekov	
2012	Letters to Angel	Kirjad Inglile	Estonia	Sulev Keedus	
2012	Presumed Consent	Prezumptsiya soglasiya	Tajikistan	Farkhot Abdullaev	
2012	The Lead	Churgoschin	Uzbekistan	Zulfikar Musakov	
**2013**	**Eternal Homecoming**	**Одвiчне повернення**	**Ukraine**	**Kira Muratova**	
2013	Everybody's Gone	Vse ushli	Georgia	Georgiy Paradzhanov	
2013	If Only Everyone	Եթե բոլորը	Armenia	Nataliya Belyauskene	
2013	Heaven – my abode	Parizod	Uzbekistan	Ayub Shahobiddinov	
2013	Lonely Island	Üksik saar	Estonia	Peeter Simm	
**2014**	**Haytarma**	**Qaytarma**	**Ukraine**	**Akhtem Seitablayev**	
**2014**	**The Excursionist**	**Ekskursantė**	Lithuania	**Audrius Juzenas**	
2014	Capitalism at Crossroad Street	Capitalism at Crossroad Street	Latvia	Ivars Seleckis	
2014	Affection	Kumar	Kyrgyzstan	Temirbek Birnazarov	
2014	The Old Man	Shal	Kazakhstan	Ermek Tursunov	
**2015**	**The Tribe**	**Плем'я**	**Ukraine**	**Myroslav Slaboshpytskyi**	
2015	Corn Island	სიმინდის კუნძული	Georgia	Giorgi Ovashvili	
2015	Queen of the Mountains	Kurmanjan Datka	Kyrgyzstan	Sadyk Sher-Niyaz	
2015	Nabat	Nabat	Azerbaijan	Elchin Musaoglu	
2015	The Owners	Ukkili kamshat	Kazakhstan	Adilkhan Yerzhanov	
**2016**	**Heavenly Nomadic**	**Sutak**	**Kyrgyzstan**	**Mirlan Abdykalykov**	
2016	1944	1944	Estonia	Elmo Nüganen	
2016	The Caucasus Trio	Kavkazskoe trio	Georgia	Eldar Shengelaia, Fuad Ibragimbekov, Temur Butikashvili	
2016	Song of Songs	Пісня пісень	Ukraine	Eva Neymann	
2016	Peace to Us in Our Dreams	Ramybė mūsų sapnuose	Lithuania	Šarūnas Bartas	
**2017**	**House of Others**	**სხვისი სახლი**	**Georgia**	**Rusudan Glurjidze**	
2017	A Father's Will	Atanyn Kereezi	Kyrgyzstan	Bakyt Mukul, Dastan Zhapar Uulu	
2017	Red Garden	Pomegranate Garden	Azerbaijan	Mirbala Səlimli	
2017	Xazonrezgi	Xazonrezgi	Uzbekistan	Zulfikar Musakov	
2017	The Plague at the Karatas Village	Chuma v aule Karatas	Kazakhstan	Adilkhan Yerzhanov	
**2018**	**The Chair**	**Savardzeli**	**Georgia**	**Eldar Shengelaia**	
2018	A Call to Father	A Call to Father	Kazakhstan	Serik Aprimov	
2018	Centaur	Centaur	Kyrgyzstan	Aktan Abdykalykov	
2018	The Last Day Before June	Nabat	Republic of Moldova	Igor Kistol	
2018	Close Relations	Рідні	Latvia, Estonia, Ukraine	Vitaly Mansky	
**2019**	**Crystal Swan**	**Хрусталь**	**Belarus**	**Darya Zhuk**	
2019	Berlin – Akkurgan	Berlin – Akkurgan	Uzbekistan	Zulfikar Musakov	
2019	The Gentle Indifference of the World	Laskovoe bezrazlichie mira	Kazakhstan	Adilkhan Yerzhanov	
2019	Munabia	Munabia	Kyrgyzstan	Taalaibek Kulmendeev	
2019	Beautiful Corruption	Beautiful Corruption	Republic of Moldova	Eugen Damaschin	

=== 2020s ===
Year	Winner and nominees	Original title	Country	Director	Ref(s)
**2020**	**Inhale-Exhale**	**Inhale-Exhale**	**Georgia**	**Dito Tsintsadze**	
2020	Running to the Sky	Jo Kuluk	Kyrgyzstan	Mirlan Abdykalykov	
2020	Your Honor!	Kohtunik	Estonia	Andres Puustusmaa	
2020	Lengthy Night	Էրկեն Կիշեր	Armenia	Edgar Baghdasaryan	
2020	Guardian of the Light	Shyrakshy	Kazakhstan	Ermek Tursunov	
**2021**	**Shambala**	**Shambala**	**Kyrgyzstan**	**Artykpai Suyundukov**	
2021	2000 Songs of Farida	სიმინდის კუნძული	Uzbekistan	Yalkin Tuychiev	
2021	Yellow Cat	Zheltaya koshka	Kazakhstan	Adilkhan Yerzhanov	
2021	In Between Dying	Səpələnmiş ölümlər arasında	Azerbaijan	Hilal Baydarov	
2021	Sweetie, You Won't Believe It	Zhanym, ty ne poverish	Kazakhstan	Yernar Nurgaliyev	
2022	Water Boy	Pesari Ob	Tajikistan	Fayzullo Faiz	
2022	The Road to Eden	Akyrky koch	Kyrgyzstan	Bakyt Mukul, Dastan Zhapar Uulu	
2022	Zulali	Zulali	Armenia	Hayk Ordyan	
2022	Herd Immunity	Onbagandar	Kazakhstan	Adilkhan Yerzhanov	

== Awards by nation ==
Country	Number of winning films	Number of nominated films
Ukraine	6	11
Georgia	6	11
Kyrgyzstan	2	13
Kazakhstan	1	17
Latvia	1	7
Lithuania	1	7
Azerbaijan	1	7
Tajikistan	1	3
Belarus	1	1
Uzbekistan	0	9
Estonia	0	8
Armenia	0	6
Moldova	0	2
