= Suspended Time =

- Release poster
- French: Hors du temps
- Directed by: Olivier Assayas
- Written by: Olivier Assayas
- Produced by: Olivier Delbosc; Olivier Assayas
- Starring: Vincent Macaigne; Micha Lescot; Nora Hamzawi; Nine d'Urso
- Cinematography: Éric Gautier
- Edited by: Marion Monnier
- Production companies: Curiosa Films; Vortex Sutra
- Distributed by: Ad Vitam
- Release date: 17 February 2024 (Berlin)
- Running time: 106 minutes
- Country: France
- Language: French
- Box office: $212,618

Suspended Time (French: Hors du temps) is a 2024 French drama film directed by Olivier Assayas. The film premiered on 17 February 2024 at the 74th Berlin International Film Festival, where it competed for the Golden Bear. It has also been selected for the MAMI Mumbai Film Festival 2024, where it was screened together with It's Not Me by Leos Carax.

== Cast ==
- Vincent Macaigne as Paul Berger
- Micha Lescot as Étienne Berger
- Nora Hamzawi as Carole
- Nine d'Urso as Morgane
- Maud Wyler as Flavia
- Dominique Reymond as Paul's psychiatrist
- Magdalena Lafont as Britt

== Reception ==
On review aggregator Rotten Tomatoes, the film holds an approval rating of 66% based on 41 reviews, with an average rating of 6.5/10. The website's critical consensus states: "Lifted by director Olivier Assayas's fluid storytelling and Vincent Macaigne's magnetic presence, Suspended Time is a warm, gently reflective pandemic portrait that, while slight and overly nostalgic, remains engaging and quietly resonant". Metacritic, which uses a weighted average, assigned the film a score of 66 out of 100, based on 13 critics, indicating "generally favorable reviews".
