= Pola X =

- Theatrical release poster
- Directed by: Leos Carax
- Screenplay by: Leos Carax; Jean-Pol Fargeau
- Based on: Pierre: or, The Ambiguities by Herman Melville
- Produced by: Bruno Pésery
- Starring: Guillaume Depardieu; Yekaterina Golubeva; Catherine Deneuve
- Cinematography: Eric Gautier
- Edited by: Nelly Quettier
- Music by: Scott Walker
- Production companies: Canal+ France 2 Cinéma; La Sept-Arte; Pandora Filmproduktion
- Distributed by: Pathé Distribution (France); Filmcoopi (Switzerland); Arthaus Filmverleih (Germany); Eurospace (Japan)
- Release dates: 13 May 1999 (Cannes); 7 October 1999 (Switzerland); 9 December 1999 (Germany); 19 September 2001 (France)
- Running time: 134 minutes
- Countries: France; Switzerland; Germany; Japan
- Language: French
- Budget: $11 million
- Box office: $791,919

Pola X is a 1999 French drama film directed by Leos Carax and starring Guillaume Depardieu, Yekaterina Golubeva and Catherine Deneuve. The film is loosely based on the Herman Melville novel Pierre: or, The Ambiguities. It revolves around a young novelist who is confronted by a woman who claims to be his lost sister, and the two begin a romantic relationship. The film title is an acronym of the French title of the novel, Pierre ou les ambiguïtés, plus the Roman numeral "X" indicating the tenth draft version of the script that was used to make the film.

The film was entered into the 1999 Cannes Film Festival. Pola X has been associated by some with the New French Extremity.

== Plot ==
Pierre lives a carefree life with his widowed mother in a Normandy chateau, enjoying rising fame as a pseudonymous author. He also visits Lucie, his fiancée and childhood friend, at her parents' chateau. In a bar he sees his cousin Thibault, a stockbroker, who says he is welcome to stay at Thibault's apartment in Paris but wonders why Pierre is being followed by a young vagrant woman. When Pierre turns to look, the woman runs away.

Driving through the forest, Pierre is disturbed to see the vagrant woman, who resembles a ghostly figure from his dreams. She tells him in a strong foreign accent that she is his half-sister Isabelle and recounts her unhappy life. She and her two companions (a Romanian woman, Razerka, and a small girl) are apparently refugees from conflict in Eastern Europe.

Abandoning his home, mother and fiancée, Pierre takes Isabelle to Paris. Trying to find Thibault, a cab driver refuses to take them any further and says that the girls stink. When they finally find Thibault, he bitterly insists he does not recognise Pierre and throws them out. Wandering the streets of Paris, fearful of deportation, the group find a cheap hotel. Pierre rejects his previous ideas for a second novel in favour of a grittier, more mature work that reflects the hidden truths of life. His publisher warns that his sophomoric pursuit of harsh truths will result in affected and inferior work compared to the youthful innocence that comes naturally to him, and refuses his request for an advance.

At the zoo, Pierre tells the small girl that to animals all humans stink. After the small girl subsequently starts telling random people in the street that they stink, a man viciously slaps her and she falls, hitting her head. She dies the next day. Again fearful of deportation, Pierre, Isabelle, and Razerka leave the girl's body and proceed to a run-down warehouse where a strange para-military group training for guerrilla warfare and rehearsing industrial music. Apparently in exchange for chaperoning Razerka safely to a man she knows there, Pierre and Isabelle are given lodging with the group. Pierre and Isabelle initially sleep separate but eventually succumb to the incestuous passion that had been coalescing between them.

Broke, Pierre tries to write his second novel, punctuated by learning of his mother's death while riding his father's motorcycle. Against the wishes of Thibault, Lucie finds Pierre at the warehouse and demands to stay there without revealing her past relationship to Pierre to Isabelle. Although she suffers from a fever and the harshness of their life in the cold warehouse, she accepts Pierre's disappearance and relationship with Isabelle and does not ask any questions. Isabelle offers to take care of Lucie during her periods of sickness, but both women suffer in silence. At the urging of his publisher and desperate to raise funds, Pierre makes an appearance on television to reveal his true identity but finds some in the television audience disbelieving him and others hostile because of his disconnection to his debut novel.

Pierre's long days of writing continue through the winter; at one point he dreams of him and Isabelle copulating and then drowning in a river of blood. During a walk by the Seine, the trio happen upon an autobiography of Pierre's father: he is alarmed when Isabelle seems not to recognise the man on the cover, supposedly their father whom Isabelle said she had met once. Despairing over her self-doubt which she fears she has instilled in Pierre, Isabelle attempts suicide and goes to a hospital where a vengeful Thibault reveals Lucie's true identity to her.

After Pierre finally receives a letter from his publisher with a brutal rejection of his anonymous submission of the first three chapters of his second novel, Isabelle confronts him over his deception. She tells him Thibault wants to meet him and warns him not to go, but he steals two handguns and a van and confronts Thibault on the street. Thibault immediately punches him and stands over Pierre mocking him, but Pierre pulls out the two pistols and forces Thibault to open his mouth. He then shoots Thibault and is tackled by several bystanders. Isabelle and Lucie arrive to find police interrogating Pierre, but he says nothing, and they put him in a police van. In despair at losing Pierre, Isabelle insists to him that she was always telling the truth and throws herself in front of an oncoming van as he sits in custody.

== Cast ==
- Guillaume Depardieu as Pierre, aspiring author
- Yekaterina Golubeva as Isabelle, Pierre's foreign half-sister
- Catherine Deneuve as Marie
- Delphine Chuillot as Lucie, Pierre's fiancé
- Laurent Lucas as Thibault
- Patachou as Margherite
- Petruta Catana as Razerka, Rumanian companion of Isabelle
- Mihaella Silaghi as The Child, companion of Razerka
- Šarūnas Bartas as The Chief
- Samuel Dupuy as Fred
- Mathias Mlekuz as TV presenter
- Dine Souli as Taxi driver
- Miguel Yeco as Augusto
- Khireddine Medjoubi as Cafe owner's son
- Mark Zak as Romanian friend
- Anne Kanis as Chef's wife (Anne Richter)
- Till Lindemann as drummer
- Christoph Schneider as drummer

== Soundtrack ==
The soundtrack was produced by Scott Walker and features some instrumental tracks by him, as well as contributions by Sonic Youth and Bill Callahan, who also has a cameo appearance in the film.

== Alternate miniseries version ==
An alternate, longer TV cut entitled Pierre ou les ambiguïtés, edited into three episodes containing an additional 40 minutes of footage, premiered on 24 September 2001 on Arte German-French TV channel. The episodes were titled A la lumière, A l'ombre des lumières and Dans le sang.

Carax edited the TV version in the spirit of serials from his childhood, in particular Vidocq. The new scenes were produced during the original shoot with additional budget raised by producer Bruno Pesery to allow them to exceed their contractually agreed 140-minute running time. Some new sequences explore the dreams of Peter and his relationship with his mother, sister and fiancée, while others lengthen or alter existing scenes. In an interview with Jacques Morice, Carax stated that, "it is not an 'extended version' or a 'final version' of the film Pola X, but a different proposition for television."

Since the miniseries' original broadcast in 2001, it has only been screened very rarely at exhibition events, and has yet to receive an official physical or streaming release of any kind to date. In late 2021, a digitised recording of a VHS tape containing this version was illegally leaked onto the internet via an unknown source, and it was translated into English for the first time.

== Home media ==
The film will be released in a 4K UHD and Blu-ray box set on November 17, 2026, by French distributor Carlotta Films; it will contain both the theatrical version and the Pierre ou les ambiguïtés miniseries, in new restorations.

== See also ==
- List of mainstream movies with unsimulated sex
