= Kurmanjan Datka =

Kyrgyz politician (1811–1907)

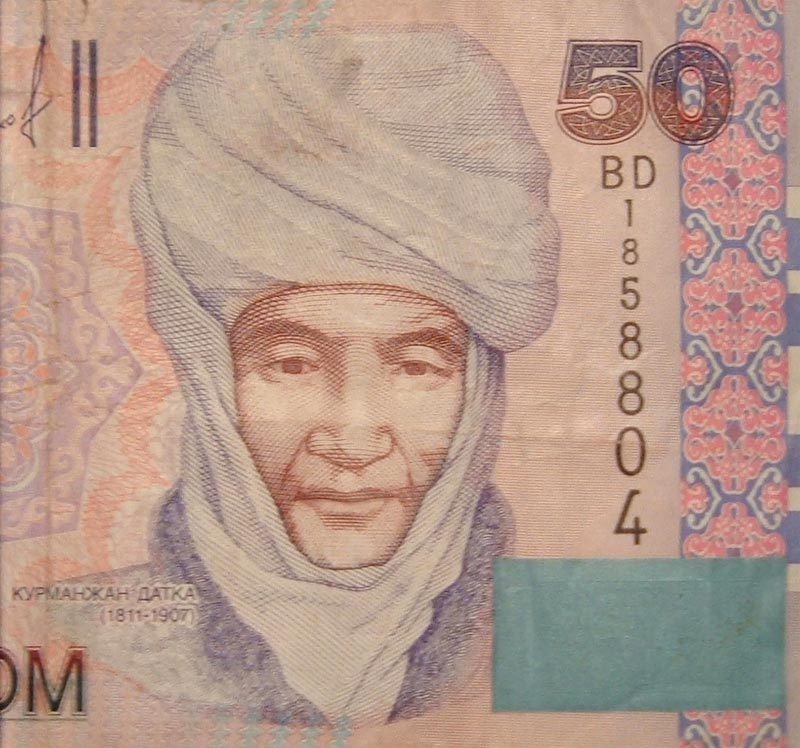
- Kurmanjan Datka, as shown on the Kyrgyz 50 som note.
- Born: 1811; Pamir-Alay, Osh Region, Khanate of Kokand
- Died: February 1, 1907 (aged 95–96); Osh, Fergana Oblast, Russian Empire
- Occupation: stateswoman
- Known for: Acquiesced under duress to the annexation of Kyrgyzstan to Russia

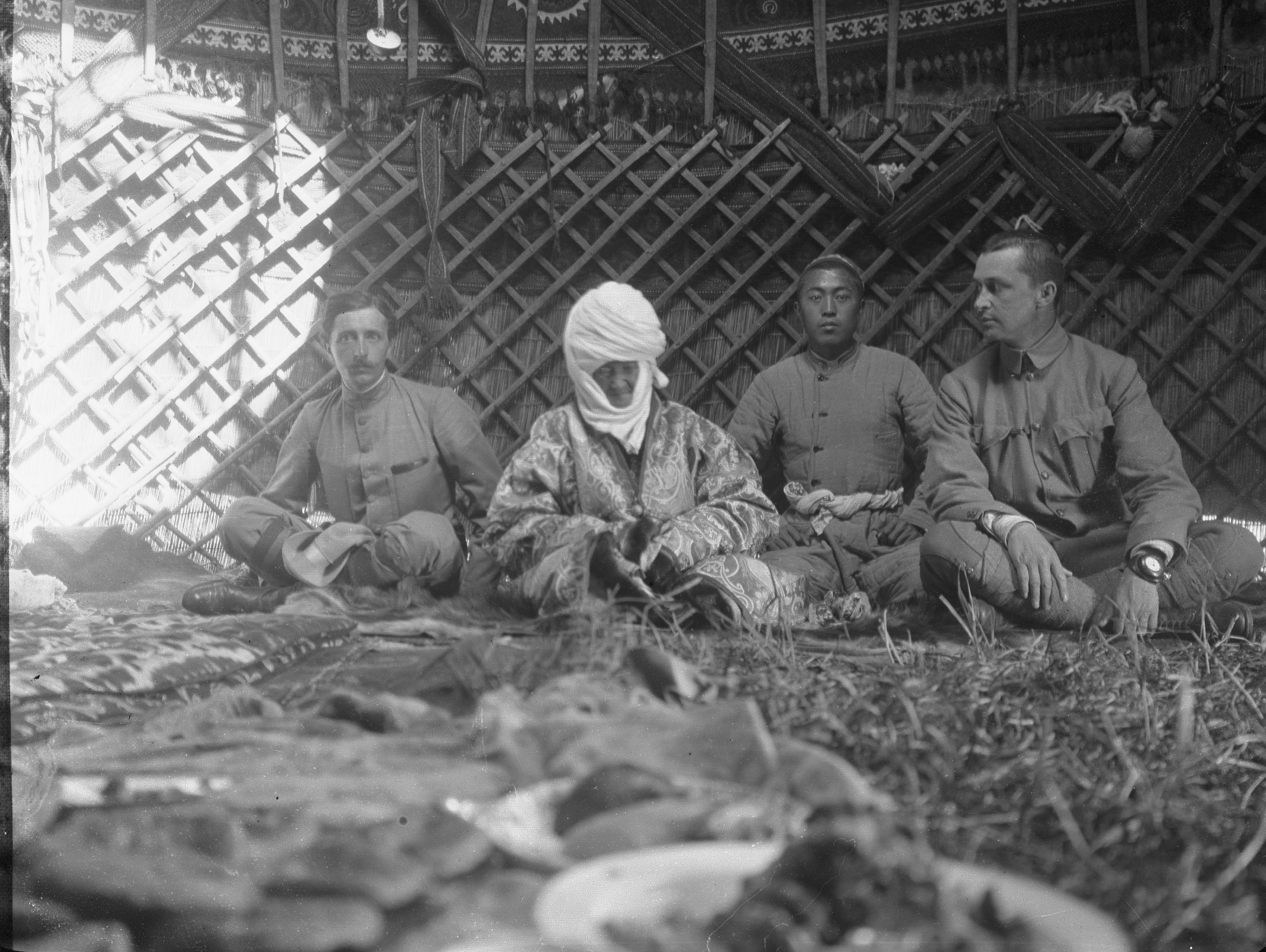
Gustaf Mannerheim (right) and Kurmanjan Datka

Kurmanjan Datka (Note: Kyrgyz: Курманжан Датка, IPA: [qʊɾmɑnt͡ɕɑ́n tɑtqɑ́]) or Datka Kurmanjan Mamatbay kyzy (22 May 1811 – 1 February 1907), also known as the "Tsaritsa of Alai" (Алайская царица) or the "Queen of the South", was a Kyrgyz politician who acquiesced under duress to the annexation of that region to Russia. She was a female tribal leader and nicknamed the Queen.

== History ==
Kurmanjan was born into a wealthy family of the Mungush clan in the Osh region. At the age of 18 she was supposed to be married to a man whom she did not see until her wedding day. When she met him, she did not like him and broke with tradition - first fleeing into neighboring China and later deciding to stay with her father, Mambatbai. In 1832, the local feudal lord, Alimbek, who had taken the title "Datka" and ruled all the Kyrgyz of the Alai, was attracted by the young, vivacious woman and married her. An instrumental politician in the increasingly decrepit Kokand khanate, Alimbek was murdered in the course of a palace coup in 1862 and his widow Kurmanjan was recognized by the khans of Bukhara and Kokand as ruler of the Alai and given the title of "Datka".

In 1876 the Alai region was annexed by the Russian Empire. Recognizing the futility of resistance, Kurmanjan Datka persuaded her people to accept Russian overlordship. During the subsequent continuing unrest and sporadic attempts by the local population to shake off Russian supremacy, gun-running and smuggling were profitable businesses and two of Kurmanjan's sons and two of her grandsons were charged with contraband trade and murdering customs officials in 1893. When her favourite son was sentenced to death, she refused the urging of some of her followers to effect a rescue, saying that she would not let her private hopes and ambitions be the cause of suffering for her people; she actually attended her son's public execution in 1895. The others were then exiled to Siberia and she essentially retired from public life.

Soon after Kurmanjan Datka became a hermit, she was reported to the emperor Nicholas II, and he decided to give her a special royal gift - a gold ladies' watch with the image of the state emblem of the empire with a chain and brooch, decorated with diamonds and roses. Accompanied by numerous mounted guards, the Osh district chief arrived in the village of Mady, solemnly presenting the "Queen of the South" with a gift from the emperor.

In 1906, she was visited by Baron Carl Gustaf Emil Mannerheim (later President of Finland) who was a colonel in the Russian army at the time. Mannerheim took her photograph. She died six months later. Kurmanjan Datka lived to be well over 96 and was survived by two sons, two daughters, 31 grandsons, 57 great grandsons and six great-great-grandsons.

Kurmanjan Datka died on February 1, 1907, at her home in Mady. She was buried in Osh next to her son Kamchibek, who was executed in 1895.

== Legacy ==
During the thirty years of sole rule in southern Kyrgyzstan, Kurmanjan Datka proved to be an outstanding stateswoman, and the legends that were composed about her were passed down from generation to generation and have reached our days. Kurmanjan enjoyed great prestige not only among the Alai and Kashgar Kyrgyz. Russian and foreign travelers, military and statesmen, and colonial officials certainly paid a visit to Kurmanjan Datka if they found themselves in the south of Kyrgyzstan. There is a case known to history when the people of Kurmanjan saved two British emissaries from death who were caught in a snowstorm on their way from India to Bukhara The "Alai Queen" made a particularly deep impression on Europeans. Articles about the legendary Kurmanjan Datka, including lifetime ones, were published in Russian, French, German, Polish and many other European publications. In 2002, a book about Kurmanjan Datka was published in three languages - Kyrgyz, Russian and English. In 2004, a monument to the ruler was erected on Erkindik Avenue in Oak Square in Bishkek. Streets in Bishkek are also named after Kurmanjan Datka and Osh.

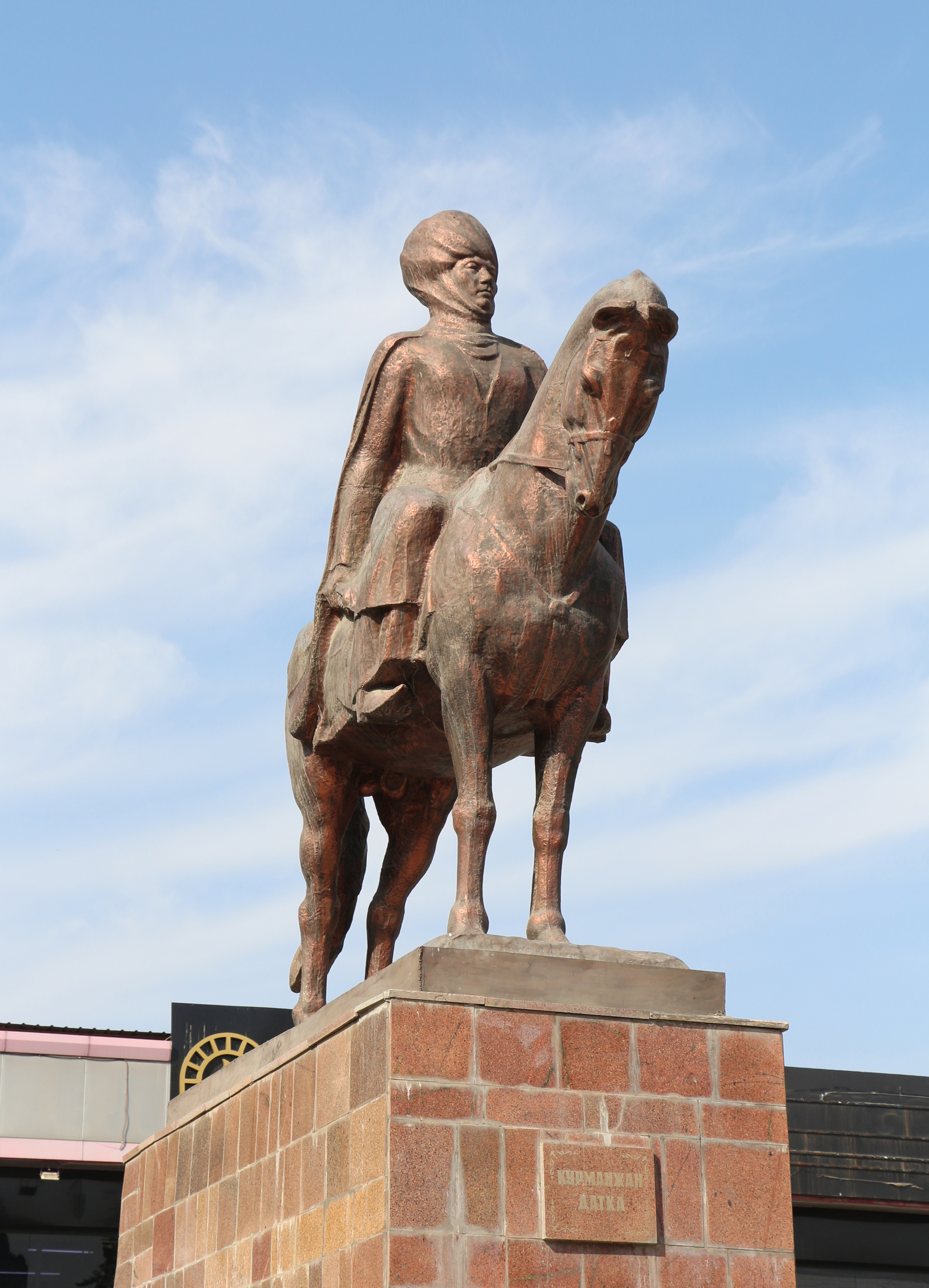
Statue of Kurmanjan Datka in Osh

The portrait of Kurmanjan can be seen on the front side of Kyrgyz banknotes worth 50 sums of all three issues. On the reverse side there is an image of an architectural complex in Uzgen, a city that was once part of the Kurmanjan possessions.

Kurmanjan Datka is the namesake of an international award established by Kyrgyz-Russian Slavic University. The prize has been repeatedly awarded to figures of science, culture and politics of different countries, in particular, the first Lady Kazakhstan (to Sarah Nazarbayeva) and Russia (Lyudmila Putin)

By decree of the acting president of the Kyrgyz Republic on December 28, 2010, declared 2011 the year of Kurmanjan Datka in the country, as the 200th anniversary of her birth. The president also held a meeting with two great-grandchildren of Kurmanjan, Kyrgyz public figure Chynybek Abdykaparov and professor of economics Adylbek Sultanbekov, who expressed their agreement with the decision of Rosa Otunbayeva.

"Kurmanjan Datka is a rare historical figure, she took responsibility during a very difficult period of the rule of the Kokand Khanate, China and Russia. Her wisdom and diplomatic skills saved us from death and destruction. She was able to find a way out of any difficult situation, therefore both Russia and the Kokand Khanate had to reckon with her". — R. I. Otunbayeva

In 2014, on August 31, Independence Day Kyrgyzstan hosted the premiere of the historical epic film "Kurmanzhan Datka" directed by Sadyk Sher-Niyaz is owned by Kyrgyzfilm and Aitysh Film studios. This is the first full-length historical feature film made by order of the Government of the Kyrgyz Republic during the years of independence of Kyrgyzstan.

The film tells about the life and work of the "Alai Queen", who was the leader of the Kyrgyz in the XIX century and is considered the mother of the nation. The world premiere of the film took place on August 22, 2014 at the international The Montreal Film Festival. In October 2014, the film was nominated on behalf of Kyrgyzstan for the Academy Award in the nomination "Best Foreign Language Film". In addition, the film is nominated for the Russian film award "Nika".

In 1995, the "Kurmanjan-Datka" women's committee, now known as Women's Public Union "Erayim", was established.

== In popular culture ==
In 2014, the film Queen of the Mountains (originally titled Kurmanjan Datka) was released, which centers around the story of her life.
