= Aitysh Film =

- Type: Film Making Company
- Industry: Film
- Founded: 2006
- Founder: Sadyk Sher-Niyaz, Temir Birnazarov
- Headquarters: Bishkek, Kyrgyzstan
- Products: Narrative, Animation, Documentary films

The film production company Aitysh Film was founded by public figure, producer and director Sadyk Sher-Niyaz in 2006 in Bishkek, Kyrgyzstan as a branch of Aitysh Public Fund. The company's purpose is the development of Kyrgyz cinema by supporting the creativity of talented young people. The company produces art-house, animation and documentary films.

In addition to Sadyk Sher-Niyaz, the other founders of Aitysh Film are Farkhad Bekmanbetov, Bakytbek Turdubaev and Akzholtoy Bekbolotov. The Director of the company is Farkhad Bekmanbetov. Since 2011, the company has hosted the annual international film festival Kyrgyzstan - Land of Short Films.

== Filmography ==
№	Film title	Category	Genre	Time	Year	Director
1	Born Kyrgyz	Documentary	Biography	45 minutes	2006	Temir Birnazarov
2	A Son's Duty	Narrative	Drama	23 minutes	2007	Temir Birnazarov
3	First Frame	Narrative	Comedy	60 minutes	2007	Sadyk Sher-Niyaz
4	City	Narrative	Drama	50 minutes	2007	Ulan Jukenov
5	Flower	Animation	Social	4 minutes	2007	Izat Abdraimov
6	Everything's OK	Narrative	Drama	17 minutes	2008	Akjol Bekbolotov
7	Strings	Narrative	Historical	10 minutes	2008	Sadyk Sher-Niyaz
8	The Bridge	Documentary	Iconic	15 minutes	2008	Bakytbek Turdubaev
9	Chord	Narrative	Drama	14 minutes	2008	Marina Ilina
10	Carousel	Narrative	Comedy	15 minutes	2008	Vladimir Shakeldyan-Zaharin
11	Force Majeure	Narrative	Psychological Drama	6 minutes	2009	Sadyk Sher-Niyaz
12	Dancing on Air	Documentary	Social	25 minutes	2009	Bakytbek Turdubaev
13	I Also Want to go to Kindergarten	Documentary	Social	12 minutes	2009	Bakytbek Turdubaev
14	We Believe in Tomorrow	Documentary	Social	16 minutes	2009	Bakytbek Turdubaev
15	Don't Let the Star of Chingyz Stop Shining!	Documentary	Requiem	10 minutes	2009	Sadyk Sher-Niyaz
16	Letter to Santa Claus	Narrative	Drama	17 minutes	2010	Akjol Bekbolotov
17	Trolleybus	Narrative	Drama	10 minutes	2010	Ernest Abdyjaparov
18	Answers for You	Documentary	Reportage	7 minutes	2010	Sadyk Sher-Niyaz
19	A Mother	Narrative	Drama	18 minutes	2011	Nurlan Abdykadyrov
20	Cup of Songs	Narrative	Comedy	10 minutes	2011	Nurlan Asanbekov
21	Salt	Narrative	Drama	45 min	2011	Marat Sarulu
22	Rain	Narrative	Drama	17 minutes	2011	Aigul bakanova
23	Kairat	Narrative	Drama	12 minutes	2011	Venera Jamankulova
24	A Gift	Narrative	Drama	7 minutes	2011	Jaken Chotonov
25	Different Roads	Animation	Drama	2,5 minutes	2011	Tolgobek Koichumanov
26	The Old Woman	Narrative	Comedy	15 minutes	2011	Nazym mendibairov
27	In the Rain	Narrative	Drama	14 minutes	2011	Aibek Daiyrbekov
28	Gold Nest	TV spectacular	Musical	40 minutes	2011	Akjol Bekbolotov
29	Running to the Fire	Documentary	Biography	19 minutes	2011	Bakyt Turdubaev
30	Dragon from the Cave	Animation	Fairytale	8 minutes	2011	Kanybek Omurbekov
31	Year of Fire	Documentary	Reportage	26 minutes	2011	Dalmira Tilepbergenova
31	Lazy man	Animation	Fairytale	8 minutes	2013	Kanybek Omurbekov
32	The Seagull	Narrative	Drama	15 minutes	2013	Elizaveta Stishova
33	Bachelor	Narrative	Comedy	80 minutes	2013	Akjol Bekbolotov
34	A wish to see her	Narrative	Drama	75 minutes	2013	Nurbek Musaev
31	I am a Big Boy	Narrative	Comedy	60 minutes	2014	Mirlan Abdulaev
3	Aku	Animation	Drama	60 minutes	2014	Tolgobek Koichumanov
31	Queen of the Mountains (film)	Narrative	Epic Drama	131 minutes	2014	Sadyk Sher-Niyaz

== Awards and Festival participation ==
'A Son's Duty' - Participation in Clermont-Ferrand International Short Film Festival and Hamburg Short Film Festival
- Special Jury Prize: International Tehran Film Festival
- Selected in the French Catalogue of Short Films 2007
- Special Prize: Eurasia International Film Festival, Astana, Kazakhstan

'First Frame' - Diploma for Best Music: International Festival of the 'Shanghai Cooperation Organisation' countries
- Diploma for Best Screenplay: 4th International Film Festival of the CIS and Baltic States 'New Cinema'

'City' Diploma for Best Debut: International Festival of 'Shanghai Cooperation Organisation' countries

'Everything's OK' - First prize: 'Odan' International Festival of Student Works (Turkey)
- Special Jury Prize: 'Start' Festival of Student Works (Azerbaijan)
- Grand Prix prize: 15th International Tehran Film Festival (Iran)
- 2nd prize: Dubai International Film Festival (United Arab Emirates)
- ARTE prize: Dresden International Film Festival (Germany)
- Grand Prix prize: 'Kyrgyzstan-Germany-France' Festival (Kyrgyzstan)
- Special Jury Prize: 'Urban' International Film Festival (Iran)
- Grand Prix prize: 1st National Film Festival Young Cinema 'Umut' (Kyrgyzstan)
- Special Jury Prize Film Festival of SCO member countries (Kyrgyzstan)
- Participation in International Film Festival Rotterdam (Netherlands)

== International Film Festival 'Kyrgyzstan - Land of Short Films' ==
Since 2011, Aitysh Film, together with the Department of Cinematography of the Kyrgyz Republic and with the support of the International Humanitarian Cooperation Fund has hosted the annual international film festival Kyrgyzstan - Land of Short Films for the Commonwealth of Independent States, the Baltic States, and Georgia. The festival has two competition programs, National and International, and awards presented in four categories: Best Film, Best Director, Special Jury Prize, and People's Choice Award. By tradition, the opening of the festival on 12 December marks the birthday of the famous national author Chingiz Aitmatov who died in 2008. Aitmatov was also a screenwriter and former Head of the Union of Filmmakers of Kyrgyzstan.
