= Amet-khan Sultan Museum =

Aerospace museum in Crimea

Coordinates: 44°25′26″N 34°03′17″E

- Музей Амет-Хана Султана
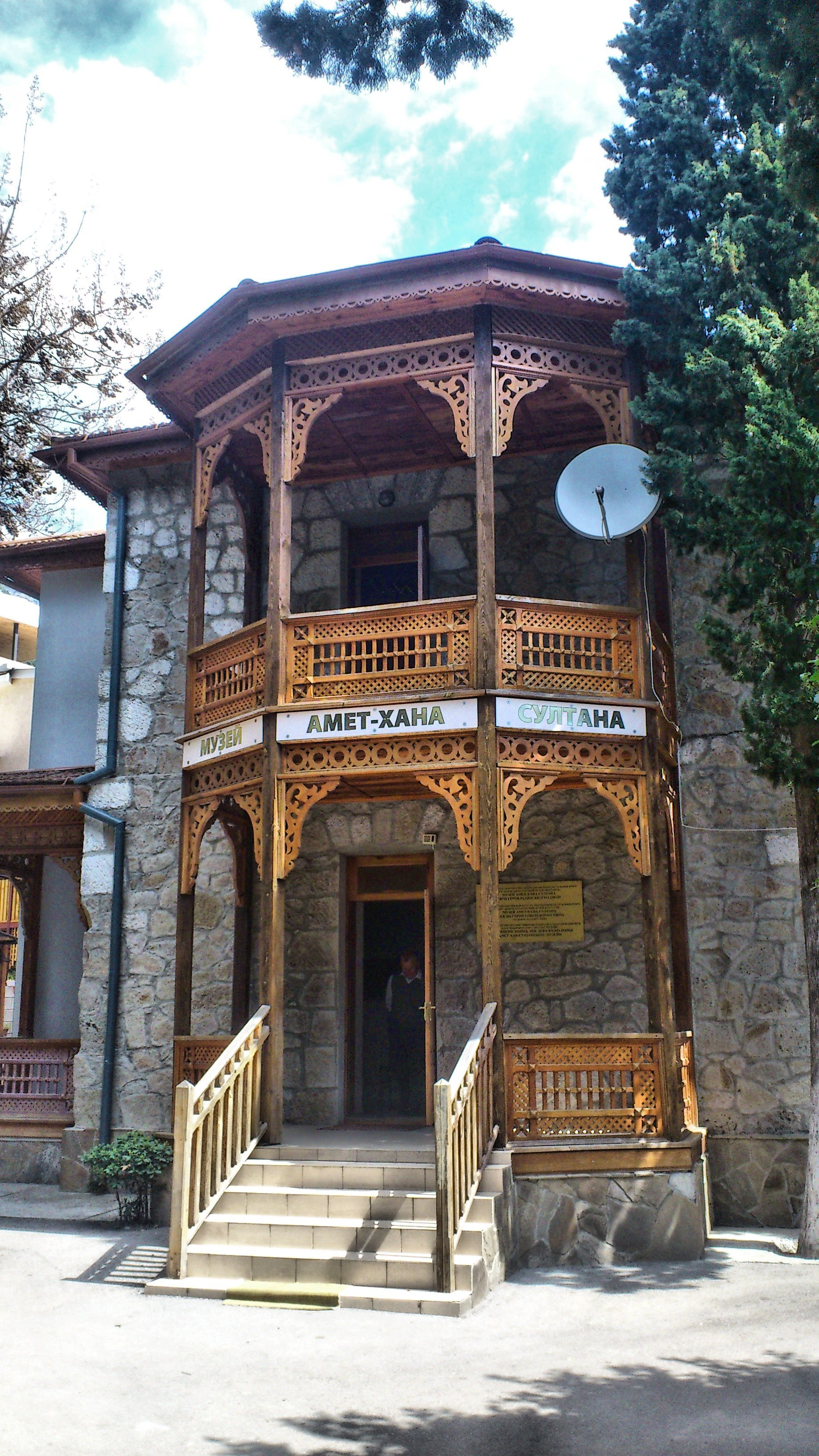
- Entrance of the museum
- Established: February 26, 1993
- Location: Alupka, Crimea, Russia/Ukraine
- Type: Aerospace museum
- Founder: Tefide Mukhterem
- Website: Official website

The Museum of Twice Hero of the Soviet Union Amet-Khan Sultan is a memorial museum in Alupka in Crimea, dedicated to the Soviet and Crimean Tatar test pilot and twice Hero of the Soviet Union Amet-khan Sultan. It opened on February 26, 1993, under the leadership of Yalta United Historical and Literary Museum researcher Tefide Mukhtarem and focuses on Amet-khan Sultan's military service and flight testing career. The institution occupies the restored former Nikolskaya dacha, which the Crimean Tatar Museum of Cultural and Historical Heritage recognizes as a protected cultural monument. Indoor and outdoor exhibits present artifacts, aircraft models, and interpretive displays that document his legacy for regional audiences.

Since 2002, the Crimean Tatar Art Museum, renamed the Crimean Tatar Museum of Cultural and Historical Heritage in 2014, has recognized the museum building, the former Nikolskaya's Dacha, as an architectural monument and a protected cultural heritage site of the peoples of Russia.

== Exhibitions ==
The museum features a permanent exhibition about Amet-khan Sultan's life, career, and flight testing activities, as well as his family and fellow fighters. Displays present memoirs from participants in the Great Patriotic War, testimony from colleagues involved in flight testing, photographs, archival documents, correspondence, books, personal belongings, and flight uniforms. The collection includes models of wartime and postwar aircraft that illustrate both military and civilian aviation. The grounds contain a La-5FN aircraft model donated after the filming of the feature film Haytarma and a missile plane that served as the prototype for the first Soviet anti-ship cruise missile KS-1 Komet.

== History ==
Since 1992, senior researcher Tefide Mukhtarem of the Yalta United Historical and Literary Museum led the effort to create a permanent exhibition about Amet-khan Sultan. The display, titled "The Life Path of the Twice Hero of the Soviet Union Amet-Khan Sultan," opened on February 26, 1993, at the Alupka City House of Culture with design work by Crimean Tatar artist Alim Useinov.

The museum held public museum status with free admission until 2002. Mukhtarem directed the institution through 2001, after which it became a branch of the Crimean Tatar Museum of Arts. Mustafa Mustafaev served as director from 2003 to 2014.

The museum building, the former Nikolskaya dacha, was transferred by the Ministry of Health of Ukraine to the Crimean Communal Property Fund for use by the museum in 1999. The house, completed in 1872, underwent restoration in 2007, and the permanent exhibition "The Life and Combat Path of the Glory of Amet-khan Sultan" opened there in 2010.

An order of the Council of Ministers of the Republic of Crimea issued on October 22, 2014, No. 1095-r, reorganized the Crimean Tatar Museum of Arts as the State Budgetary Institution of the Republic of Crimea "Crimean Tatar Museum of Cultural and Historical Heritage." The institution includes four departments: the Collections Department, the Research and Exhibition Department, the Cultural-Educational and Exhibition Department, and a field museums division that oversees sites in Alupka and Stary Krym.

Tefide Useinovna Mukhtarem became director in March 2015. Landscaping work added a pedestal for the missile plane display and refreshed the second floor exhibits in October 2015. The museum restored the La-5FN airplane model in October 2016.

Plans call for the construction of a memorial complex honoring Amet-khan Sultan in Simferopol.

== Gallery ==
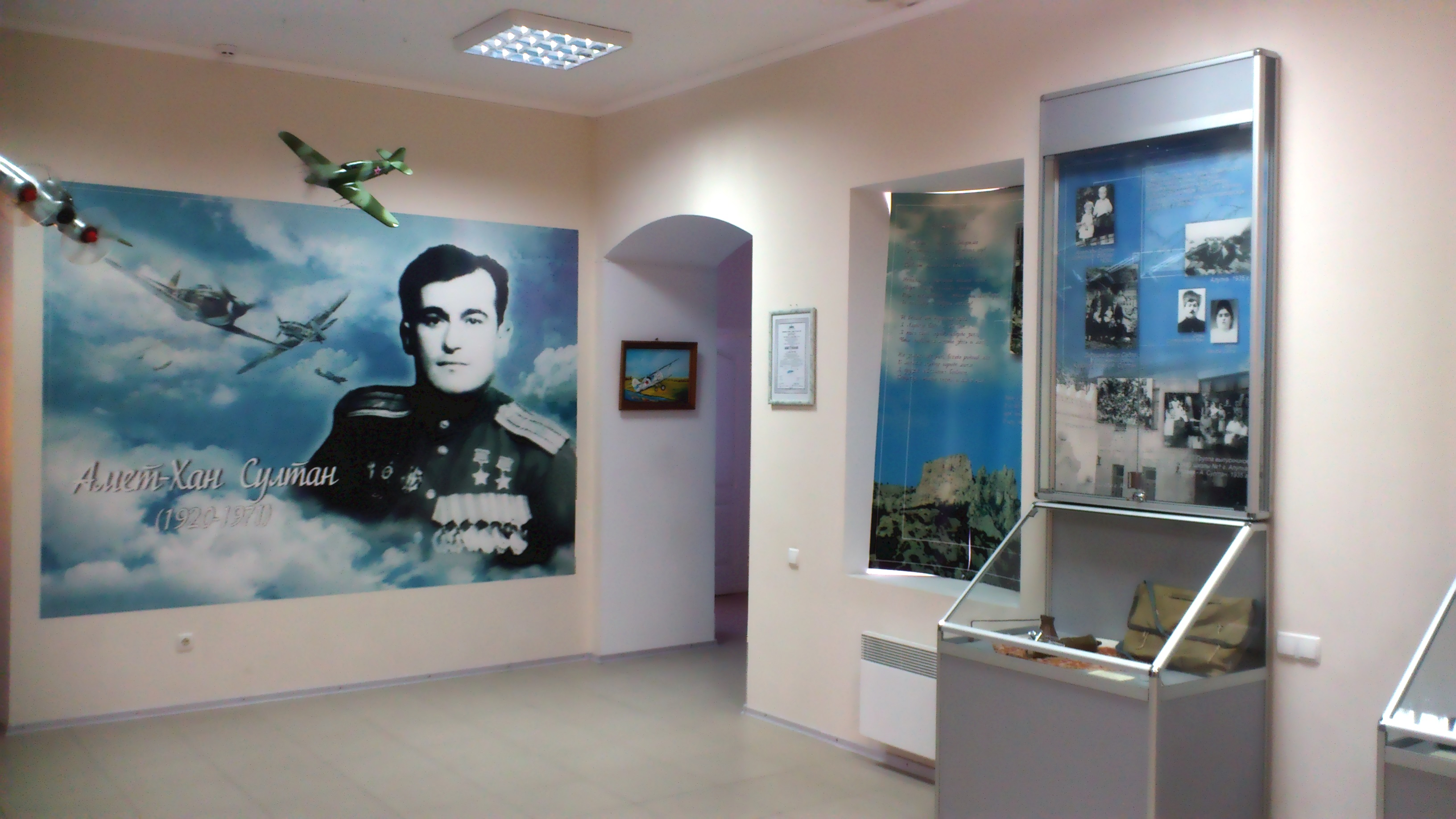
A fragment of the exposition of the Museum of Twice Hero of the Soviet Union Amet-khan Sultan in Alupka

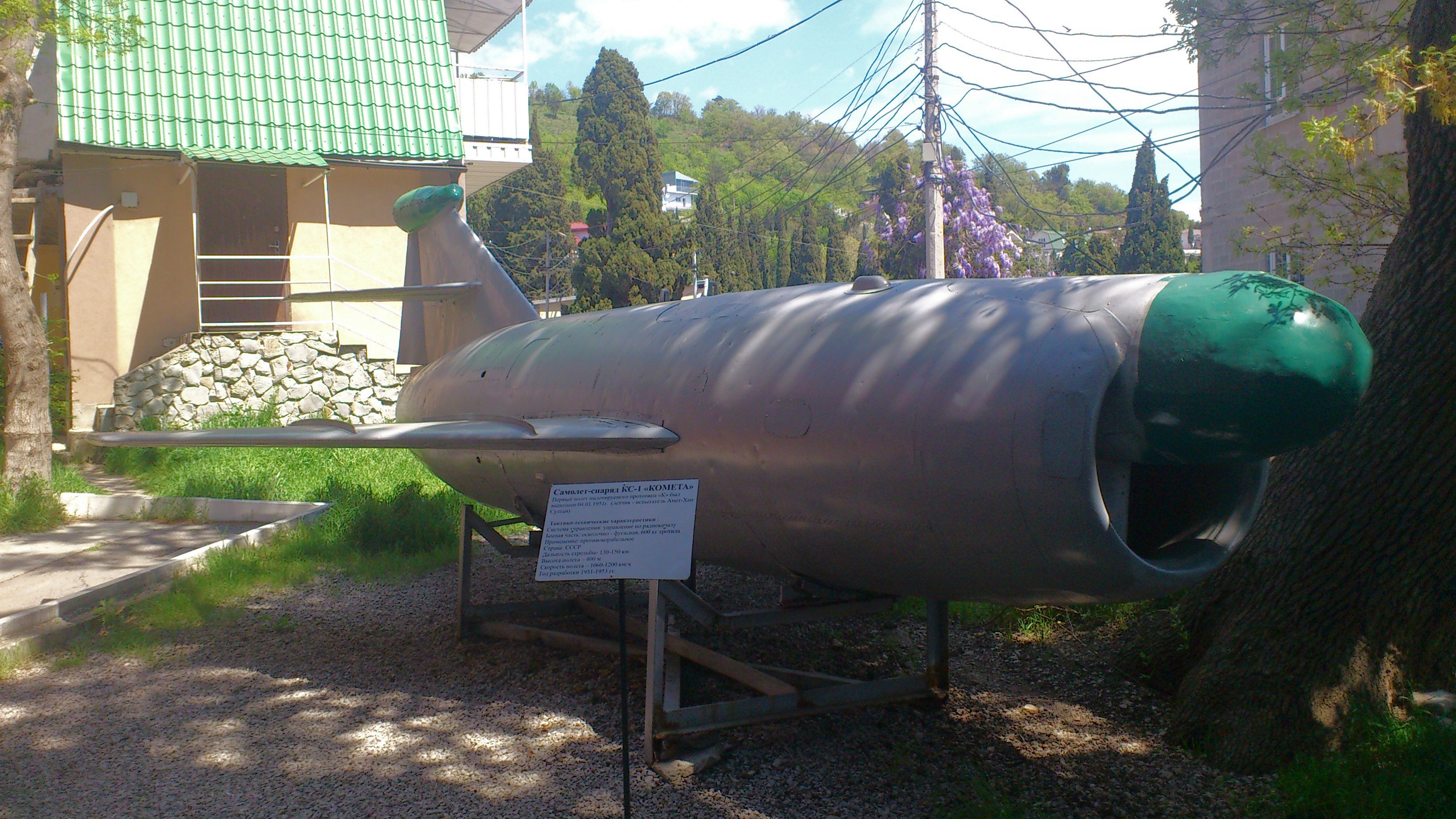
Prototype of the KS-1 cruise missile, which was tested by Amet-khan Sultan

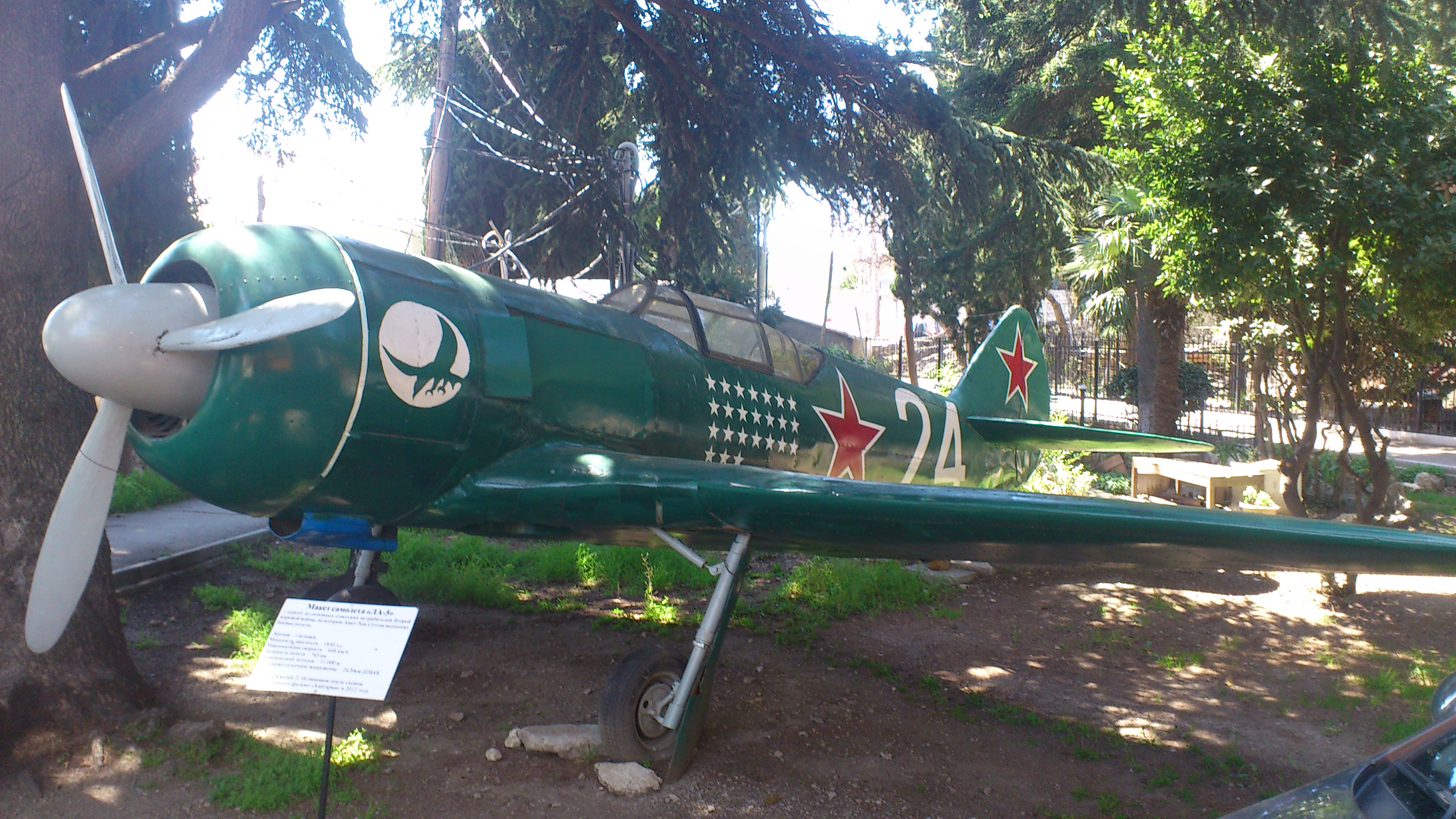
Model of the La-5FN in the open area of the museum
