= It's Not Me =

2024 film by Leos Carax

- Theatrical release poster
- French: C'est pas moi
- Directed by: Leos Carax
- Written by: Leos Carax
- Produced by: Charles Gillibert; Leos Carax
- Starring: Denis Lavant; Kateryna Yuspina; Nastya Golubeva Carax; Loreta Juodkaite; Bianca Maddaluno; Anna-Isabel Siefken; Petr Anevskii
- Cinematography: Caroline Champetier
- Edited by: Leos Carax
- Production companies: CG Cinéma; Théo Films; Arte France Cinéma
- Distributed by: Les Films du Losange
- Release dates: 18 May 2024 (Cannes); 12 June 2024 (France)
- Running time: 41 minutes
- Country: France

It's Not Me (French: C'est pas moi) is a 2024 French film written and directed by Leos Carax.

It had its world premiere in the non-competitive Cannes Premiere section at the 77th Cannes Film Festival on 18 May 2024. It was theatrically released on 12 June 2024 by Les Films du Losange.

== Synopsis ==
It's Not Me is self-portrait written in the first person. It is described by CG Cinéma as a "free-form" and "cut-up" film which features Leos Carax rediscovering the figures from his oeuvre. Traversing his 40-year filmography, it visits the decisive moments of his career, while capturing the political evolution of that time.

== Cast ==
- Leos Carax as LC
- Denis Lavant as Monsieur Merde
- Kateryna Yuspina as La mère
- Nastya Golubeva Carax as La pianiste
- Loreta Juodkaite as La spinneuse
- Bianca Maddaluno as La soeur
- Anna-Isabel Siefken as La plongeuse
- Petr Anevskii as Le frère
- Juliette Binoche (archival footage)
- Michel Piccoli (archival footage)
- Jean-François Balmer (archival footage)
- Guillaume Depardieu (archival footage)
- Yekaterina Golubeva (archival footage)

== Production ==
The project was first announced in May 2023 by CG Cinéma upon the wrap of principal photography in Paris. Leos Carax reteamed with cinematographer Caroline Champetier and production designer Florian Sanson, both of whom worked on Carax's last two films Annette and Holy Motors.

The first stills from the production indicate the return of Monsieur Merde, a character played by Denis Lavant in Holy Motors (2012) and the segment Merde of the omnibus film Tokyo! (2008). In the same photos, Carax is seen acting in the film with matching red hair and a goatee. In August 2023, during a masterclass at the 27th Lima Film Festival, Carax described it as an "essay" film and revealed it will be under an hour in length. He called it a very low-budget film made "without pressures".

The film was produced by Charles Gillibert at CG Cinéma, who produced Carax's previous film Annette, and by Carax through his company Théo Films. It was co-produced by Arte France Cinéma, in association with Scala Films, and with the participation of French fashion house Chanel.

== Release ==
The film was selected to be screened in the non-competitive Cannes Premiere section at the 77th Cannes Film Festival, where it had its world premiere on 18 May 2024. It was theatrically released in France on 12 June 2024 by Les Films du Losange. It was also selected in Icons at the 29th Busan International Film Festival and screened on 4 October 2024.

The film has been selected for the MAMI Mumbai Film Festival 2024 under the World Cinema section, where it will be screened together with Suspended Time by Olivier Assayas.

== Critical response ==
On the review aggregator website Rotten Tomatoes, 89% of 18 critics' reviews are positive, with an average rating of 7.5/10. On AlloCiné, the film received an average rating of 3.7 out of 5 stars, based on 20 reviews from French critics. Metacritic, which uses a weighted average, assigned the film a score of 78 out of 100, based on 10 critics, indicating "generally favorable" reviews.

== See also ==
- Mr. Leos caraX, 2014 documentary about Leos Carax
