= Yekaterina Golubeva =

Russian actress (1966–2011)

- Born: 9 October 1966; Leningrad, Russian SFSR, Soviet Union
- Died: August 2011 (aged 44); Paris, France
- Occupation: Actress
- Spouse: Šarūnas Bartas (divorced)
- Partner: Leos Carax
- Children: 3, including Ina Marija Bartaitė

Yekaterina Nikolaevna Golubeva (Russian: Екатери́на Никола́евна Го́лубева; 9 October 1966 – August 2011), (Note: Golubeva's death date is sometimes given as the 3rd, sometimes as the 14th of August.) usually credited as Katerina Golubeva or Katia Golubeva, was a Russian actress who moved to Paris and became known for her films with such directors as Šarūnas Bartas, Claire Denis, and Leos Carax.

== Biography ==
Golubeva was born in Leningrad. After studying at the Gerasimov Institute of Cinematography she began her acting career in Russian films.

She moved to Paris, France and lived and worked there. She married Lithuanian film director Šarūnas Bartas and starred in a series of films made under his direction. She also was a co-writer of the screenplay for his film The House (1997).

She also starred in films by Claire Denis and in her partner Leos Carax's Pola X (1999).

Golubeva died in Paris in August 2011; no official cause of death was given. She was buried at Père Lachaise Cemetery.

She was survived by three children. Her daughter Ina Marija Bartaitė became an actress. She was killed at the age of 24 in a traffic accident in April 2021 while bicycling, after being hit by a drunk driver.

== Partial filmography ==
Actress

- Nauchis tantsevat (1985) – Larisa
- Skazka pro vlyublyonnogo malyara (1987) — Katusha
- Three Days (1991)
- I Can't Sleep (1994) – Daiga
- Solina (1994, short) – Solina
- The Corridor (1995)
- Pribytiye poyezda (1995, segment Exercise No.5)
- Sur place (1996)
- Few of Us (1996)
- Sans titre (1997, short)
- Un affare trasversale (1998)
- Pola X (1999) – Isabelle
- L'Âme-soeur (1999, short) — Natalia
- Rostov-papa (2001, segment Les hommes de sa femme) — Natasha (dans le générique — Katerina Korf)
- Twentynine Palms (2003) – Katia
- Katia (2004, short) — Katia
- The Intruder (2004) – La jeune femme russe
- 977 (2006) – Tamara
- Essai 135 (2007, short) — Voix off
- Il dit qu'il est mort (2008, short) – La femme
- American Widow (2009) – Traveling woman
- Suite noire (2009, segment La reine des connes) — Aïcha
- Kotorogo ne bylo (2010) — Daria
- L’invention des jours heureux (2011, short) — Olga
- Dom s bashenkoy (2011) – Boy's ill mother
- The Funeral Party (2014) — Nina (film shot in 2010 but released in 2014)
- Histoire de l’ombre (histoire de France) (2014)

Screenwriter

- The House (1997, co-writer, dir. Šarūnas Bartas)
