= Eastern Drift =

- Film poster
- Lithuanian: Eurazijos aborigenas
- French: Indigène d'Eurasie
- Directed by: Šarūnas Bartas
- Written by: Šarūnas Bartas; Catherine Paillé
- Produced by: Grégoire Debailly
- Cinematography: Šarūnas Bartas
- Edited by: Danielius Kokanauskis
- Music by: Alexander Zekke
- Release date: 11 February 2010 (Berlinale)
- Running time: 111 minutes
- Countries: Lithuania; France; Russia
- Languages: Lithuanian; French; Russian

Eastern Drift is a 2010 Lithuanian crime film directed by Šarūnas Bartas, starring Bartas and Klavdiya Korshunova. Its Lithuanian title is Eurazijos aborigenas and its French title is Indigène d'Eurasie, which means "Eurasian native". It tells the story of a drug smuggler who wants to quit, but is betrayed and tries to flee, together with his prostitute ex-girlfriend, from Moscow to France through Belarus and Lithuania. The film premiered in the Forum section of the 60th Berlin International Film Festival.

== Cast ==
- Šarūnas Bartas as Gena
- Klavdiya Korshunova as Sasha
- Erwan Ribard as Philippe
- Elisa Sednaoui as Gabrielle
- Aurélien Vernhes-Lermusiaux as Aurélien

== Reception ==
Neil Young wrote in The Hollywood Reporter: "The fact that Bartas -- no oil-painting -- has co-devised a scenario where he's lusted after by two gorgeous babes may strike many as narcissistic. Ditto his decision to give himself numerous close-ups and to show off his wiry physique in a nude scene that allows contemplation of his trim buttocks. ... Taken as a whole, however, there is something quietly persuasive and cumulatively engaging about Eastern Drift, not least the way it depicts a Europe that seems to have become progressively 'Russified' since the early 1990s. Bartas finds grey, bleak corners of every city he comes across, often with ironically inappropriate terms like 'Eldorado' and 'Shangri-La' spelled out in Cyrillic neon on building fronts." Variety's Leslie Felperin wrote: "With the nicely shot but messily assembled thriller Eastern Drift, a French-Lithuanian-Russian co-prod, Lithuanian helmer-writer-lenser-thesp Sharunas Bartas further demonstrates, after Seven Invisible Men, that he should stick to camera operating. ... Dire editing, Bartas’ inability to shoot action, act himself or direct thesps all create a tedious excursion."
