= The House (1997 film) =

1997 film

- Directed by: Šarūnas Bartas
- Written by: Šarūnas Bartas; Yekaterina Golubeva
- Produced by: Paulo Branco
- Starring: Valeria Bruni Tedeschi
- Cinematography: Šarūnas Bartas; Rimvydas Leipus
- Edited by: Mingilié Murmulaitiné
- Release date: 1 October 1997
- Running time: 120 minutes
- Countries: Lithuania; France
- Languages: Lithuanian, French

The House (Lithuanian: Namai) is a 1997 French-Lithuanian drama film directed by Šarūnas Bartas. It was screened in the Un Certain Regard section at the 1997 Cannes Film Festival.

== Cast ==
- Valeria Bruni Tedeschi
- Leos Carax
- Micaela Cardoso
- Oksana Chernych
- Alex Descas
- Egle Kuckaite
- Jean-Louis Loca
- Viktorija Nareiko
- Francisco Nascimento
- Eugenia Sulgaite
- Leonardas Zelcius
- Marija Olšauskaitė

== Production ==
The old country manor where the film was shot is the famous Užutrakis Manor, which at the time of filming was abandoned and damaged by the previous Soviet occupation, ended in 1991. Restoration works began only in 1998, significantly altering the appearance of the villa compared to the film.
