= International Film Festival Kyrgyzstan - Land of Short Films =

Former Soviet Union film festival

The International Film Festival Kyrgyzstan - Land of Short Films is an annual film festival held to celebrate short films from the former Soviet Union. The 5th Annual International Film Festival Kyrgyzstan - Land of Short Films was held December 12–15, 2015 in Bishkek, Kyrgyz Republic.

== History ==
In 2011, Kyrgyzstan - Land of Short Films was founded by director, producer, and public figure, Sadyk Sher-Niyaz. Every year the Festival is organized by the Aitysh Public Fund, Aitysh Film, and the Union of Filmmakers of the Kyrgyz Republic from December 12–15 and takes place at the Manas Cinema Hall in Bishkek, Kyrgyzstan. The Festival Opening marks the birthday of the Kyrgyz writer Chingiz Aitmatov. The official language of the Film Festival is Russian. The Festival accepts all short films (including documentary, animations, and live action) from the former Soviet Union, including the Republic of Georgia and the Baltic states.

In 2025, it is announced that the festival's 13th edition will take place from December 12-15 in Bishkek.

== Mission ==
The festival is devoted to the memory of the writer Chingiz Aitmatov. Its purpose is to support short films, promote its status and traditional values, continue the preservation of uniform cinema space of the CIS countries, Baltic states and Georgia, promote creative contacts between cinematographers.

== Program and Juries ==
The Festival includes two programs—International and National Competition.

Each year the Festival invites 5 Jury Members well-known throughout the former Soviet Union to participate in the Festival Programs. Past jury members have included George Ovashvili and Khodjakuli Narliev.

== Awards ==
The Festival Jury selects the final awards for the International and National competitions in the following categories:

Best Film Best Director Special Jury Prize Audience Award

The Festival awards cash prizes for the winners in the total amount of 500,000 Kyrgyz som.
