= Aitysh Public Fund =

"Aitysh" Public Fund
- Founded: 2001
- Founder: Sadyk Sher-Niyaz
- Type: Charitable organization
- Location: Bishkek, Kyrgyzstan

Aitysh Public Fund is a charitable organization, which aims to promote and develop culture throughout Kyrgyzstan. Founded by public figure, producer and director Sadyk Sher-Niyaz in 2001 in the capital of Bishkek, the structure of the Fund consists of the Union of Improvised Singing ‘Aitysh’, Film Production Company ‘Aitysh Film’, International Film Festival "Kyrgyzstan - Land of Short Films", Manas Cinema network and Literary Organization ‘Kalemger’.

== History ==
The idea of creating Aitysh Public Fund was born in 1998 as at this time the art of traditional improvised singing was poorly developed throughout the country.

In 2001, Sadyk Sher-Niyaz established the Fund to support young singing improvisers and to restore the former greatness of this traditional art known as ‘Aitysh’. Together with such well-known singing improvisers as Ashyraly Aytaliev, Estebes Tursunaliev and Tuuganbay Abdiev, Sadyk Sher-Niyaz established a school for young singing improvisers. By 2014, the school had approximately 30 students.

In 2003, the singing improvisers were included in the UNESCO List of the Intangible Cultural Heritage of Humanity. The Head of UNESCO, Kōichirō Matsuura, gave special thanks to the founder, Sadyk Sher-Niyaz, for his contribution to world culture.

In 2004, the Russian NTV television channel devoted a programme to Aitysh Public Fund and the art of improvised singing and in 2005, the largest US newspaper ‘The Washington Post’ published an article about this tradition.

The Fund has helped to establish new, talented singing improvisers such as Amantay Kutmanaliev, Jenishbek Toktobek, Elmirbek Imanaliev, Aaly Tutkuchev, Azamat Bolgonbaev. In addition, the Fund has contributed to the resumption of cultural unity between Kyrgyzstan and Kazakhstan through international competitive concerts.

Later Aitysh Public Fund started to promote the development of other spheres of Kyrgyz culture and from 2004 to launch new cultural projects.

== Activities ==
Since 2001, Aitysh Public Fund has organized and sponsored:

- competitive concerts for singing improvisers 2-3 times per year, with a prize fund of one million Kyrgyz som
- charity concerts, cultural events and celebrations of the anniversaries of eminent singing improvisers
- film festivals, film screenings and other events in the field of cinema.

The fund also supports the release, presentation and distribution of publications, video and audio materials, the authors of which include singing improvisers and others.

In 2004, due to the large interest in the art of improvised singing among the population, the first public TV channel Public Television Radio Corporation (PTRC) and the second channel ElTR began live broadcasts of the competitive concerts.

Regular partners include the Ministry of Culture of the Kyrgyz Republic, International Humanitarian Cooperation Fund, The Platform ‘Dialogue Eurasia’, Kyrgyzfilm and International PEN.

== Projects ==
In 2001, in order to promote the development of the traditional art of improvised singers, Sadyk Sher-Niyaz founded a school for young singing improvisers.

In December 2004, he also founded the literary organization ‘Kalemger’. The purpose of the organization is to support young, talented writers in Kyrgyzstan. Several collections of member's work have been released, as well as dozens of periodic anthologies.

In 2006, Sadyk Sher-Niyaz founded the film production company ‘Aitysh Film’. The main objective of the film company is the development of Kyrgyz cinema by supporting the creativity of talented young people. Aitysh Film produces art-house, animation and documentary films.

‘Kyrgyzstan – Land of Short Films’, an annual International Film Festival for short films from the Commonwealth of Independent States, the Baltic States and Georgia, has been held in Bishkek, Kyrgyzstan since 2011. Traditionally, the festival opens on 12 December and lasts four days. The opening date of the festival marks the birthday of the famous Kyrgyz author Chingiz Aitmatov, who died in 2008. Aitmatov was also a screenwriter and former Head of the Union of Filmmakers of Kyrgyzstan.
