= Saide Arifova =

Crimean Tatar educator

- Born: 13 February 1916; Bakhchysarai, Crimea, Russian Empire
- Died: 9 September 2007 (age 91); Bakhchysarai, Ukraine

Saide Arifova (13 February 1916 – 9 September 2007) was a Crimean Tatar woman from Bakhchisarai, Crimea, who saved at least 74 Jewish children from the Nazis and the NKVD during World War II.

== Life ==
During the Nazi occupation of Crimea she worked as a kindergarten director and managed to forge documents, altering the Jewish children's recorded ethnicity to Crimean Tatar, teaching them to speak Crimean Tatar and to adopt Crimean Tatar customs. She also managed to conceal children from Kerch orphanage, who were due to be sent to Germany for medical experiments. The Nazis suspected she was involved in their concealment and tortured her, but she did not disclose any information. Despite resisting the Nazis and becoming a victim of the Gestapo herself, she still was deported to Uzbek SSR during Sürgün, as the Crimean Tatars were considered collectively guilty of collaboration. She did manage to convince the NKVD that the children were Jewish, not Crimean Tatar, and save them from exile. Only after Perestroika did she return to Crimea where she died in 2007.

Multiple sources claim she was declared Righteous Among the Nations by Yad Vashem, but she is not listed as a person awarded the title anywhere in their database. She is the main protagonist in the 2017 Ukrainian film, Another's Prayer, directed by Akhtem Seitablaiev, a Crimean Tatar film director who was born in exile. The movie was supposed to be filmed in Crimea, but after the annexation of Crimea by the Russian Federation in 2014 it was instead filmed in Georgia and mainland Ukraine.
