= 977 (film) =

2006 film

- Russian film poster
- Russian: Девять семь семь
- Directed by: Nikolay Khomeriki
- Written by: Nikolay Khomeriki; Yuni Davydov; Aleksandr Rodionov
- Produced by: Arsen Gottlieb; Vladimir Luzanov
- Starring: Fyodor Lavrov
- Cinematography: Alisher Khamidkhodjaev
- Edited by: Igor Kireyev
- Release date: 27 May 2006 (Cannes)
- Running time: 86 minutes
- Country: Russia
- Language: Russian

977 (Russian: Девять семь семь, romanized: Devyat sem sem, lit. 'Nine seven seven') is a 2006 Russian sci-fi drama film directed by Nikolay Khomeriki. It was screened in the Un Certain Regard section at the 2006 Cannes Film Festival, and was the only Russian film to show that year at the festival.

== Cast ==
- Fyodor Lavrov as Ivan
- Klavdiya Korshunova as Rita
- Yekaterina Golubeva as Tamara
- Pavel Lyubimtsev as Sergei Sergeyevich
- Alisa Khazanova as Sonya
- Andrei Kazakov as Gosha
- Olga Demidova
- Sergei Tsepov as Valera
- Igor Ovchinnikov
- Sergei Petrov
- Stanislav Mikhin
- Anna Ardova
- Tatyana Mitienko as Lyubov
- Irina Barskaya as Twin Ira
- Darya Barskaya as Twin Masha
- Leos Carax as Technic
