= Few of Us =

1996 film

- Directed by: Šarūnas Bartas
- Written by: Šarūnas Bartas
- Produced by: Paulo Branco; Joachim von Mengershausen
- Starring: Yekaterina Golubeva
- Cinematography: Šarūnas Bartas
- Edited by: Mingailė Murmulaitienė
- Release date: 18 September 1996
- Running time: 105 minutes
- Country: Lithuania
- Language: None

Few of Us (Lithuanian: Mūsų nedaug) is a 1996 Lithuanian drama film directed by Šarūnas Bartas. It was screened in the Un Certain Regard section at the 1996 Cannes Film Festival. The film shows a young woman visiting a nomadic Tofalar tribe in the Sayan Mountains. There is no dialogue throughout the film.

== Cast ==
- Yekaterina Golubeva
- Piotr Kishteev
- Sergei Tulayev
