= Tale in the Darkness =

2009 film

- Russian Film Poster
- Directed by: Nikolay Khomeriki
- Written by: Aleksandr Rodionov
- Produced by: Roman Borisevich
- Starring: Alisa Khazanova
- Cinematography: Alisher Khamidkhodjaev
- Release date: May 2009
- Running time: 72 minutes
- Country: Russia
- Language: Russian

Tale in the Darkness (Russian: Сказка про темноту, romanized: Skazka pro temnotu) is a 2009 Russian drama film directed by Nikolay Khomeriki. It competed in the Un Certain Regard section at the 2009 Cannes Film Festival.

== Plot ==
An employee of the Inspectorate for Minors Angelina lives in Vladivostok on the shore of the Sea of Japan. In the southern streets at night and in the daytime young, beautiful, energetic men and women are busy with one thing: getting acquainted, flirting, falling in love. Gelya is completely alone.

== Cast ==
- Alisa Khazanova as Angelina (Gelya)
- Yuri Safarov as Bagrat
- Boris Kamorzin as Dimych

== Awards and nominations ==
- Bratislava International Film Festival 2009 — Grand Prix (nom)
- Cannes Film Festival 2009 — Un Certain Regard Award (nom)
- Nika Award 2010 — Best Cinematographer (Alisher Khamidkhodjaev; nom)
- Pacific Meridian 2009 — Award from Vladivostok Mayor (Alisa Khazanova; won)
- Russian Guild of Film Critics 2009 — Best Cinematographer (Alisher Khamidkhodjaev; won), Best Supporting Actor (Boris Kamorzin; won)
- Sochi Open Russian Film Festival 2009 — Best Actor (Boris Kamorzin; won), Grand Prize of the Festival Full-Length Film (nom)
