= Nikolay Khomeriki =

Russian film director

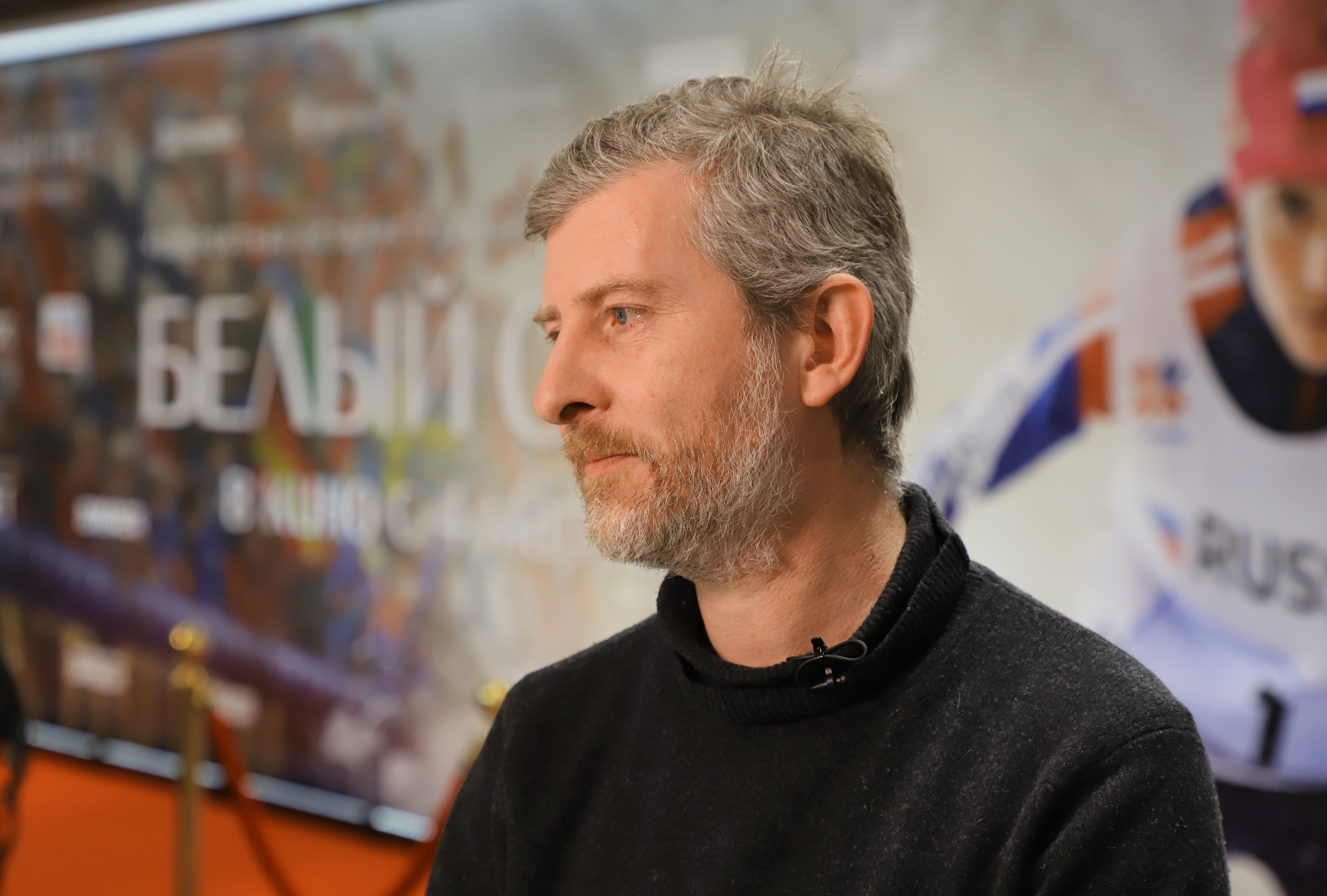
- Born: 17 April 1975 (age 51); Russia
- Occupations: Film director Screenwriter
- Years active: 2004-present

Nikolay Khomeriki (born 17 April 1975) is a Russian film director and screenwriter. He has directed six films since 2004. His film 977 was screened in the Un Certain Regard section at the 2006 Cannes Film Festival. Three years later his film Tale in the Darkness competed in the same section at the 2009 Cannes Film Festival.

== Filmography ==
- Tempête (2004)
- Vdvoyom (2005)
- 977 (2006)
- Belyaev (2009)
- Tale in the Darkness (2009)
- Heart's Boomerang (2011)
- The Icebreaker (2016)
- Selfie (2018)
- White Snow (2021)
- Freeze Dance (2021)
