= The Corridor (1995 film) =

- Directed by: Šarūnas Bartas
- Written by: Šarūnas Bartas
- Produced by: Šarūnas Bartas; Ilona Ziok
- Cinematography: Rimvydas Leipus
- Edited by: Mingailė Murmulaitienė
- Release date: 18 October 1995
- Running time: 79 minutes
- Country: Lithuania
- Language: Lithuanian

The Corridor (Lithuanian: Koridorius) is a 1995 Lithuanian drama film directed by Šarūnas Bartas. It has a fragmentary narrative without dialogue and depicts several people in Vilnius. According to the director, the title symbolizes "the atmosphere of a corridor between yesterday and today, containing many doors".

The film was shown in the Panorama section of the 45th Berlin International Film Festival. It won the Fipresci Prize at the 1995 Vienna International Film Festival.

== Cast ==
- Yekaterina Golubeva
- Viacheslav Amirhanian
- Šarūnas Bartas
- Eimuntas Nekrošius
- Mantvydas Janeliūnas
- Jurga Karauskaitė
- Daiva Kšivickienė

== Reception ==
David Stratton of Variety wrote: "The camera lingers on various characters, including a youth played by the director, who just sit or stand about, looking miserable. Nothing much happens. ... Whatever Bartas was trying to communicate in The Corridor is difficult to determine, and maybe only the initiated can work it out."
