= Three Days (1992 film) =

- Directed by: Šarūnas Bartas
- Written by: Šarūnas Bartas
- Produced by: Audrius Kuprevičius
- Cinematography: Vladas Naudžius
- Edited by: Mingilié Murmulaitiné
- Music by: Šarūnas Bartas
- Release dates: 15 November 1991 (Cinema Giovani); 15 February 1992 (Berlin)
- Running time: 75 minutes
- Country: Soviet Union
- Languages: Russian, Lithuanian

Three Days (Lithuanian: Trys dienos) is a 1991 Soviet drama film directed by Šarūnas Bartas. It is set in Kaliningrad and tells the story of four young people, two Lithuanian boys and two Russian girls, who due to misery and self-absorption are incapable of anything other than physical connection.

The film was shown in the Forum section of the 42nd Berlin International Film Festival, where it received two awards. It was nominated for Best Young European Film at the 5th European Film Awards.

== Cast ==
- Yekaterina Golubeva
- Rimma Latypova
- Arūnas Sakalauskas
- Audrius Stonys
