= Freeze Dance =

- Poster
- Directed by: Nikolay Khomeriki
- Written by: Nikolay Khomeriki; Aleksandr Rodionov
- Produced by: Roman Borisevich
- Starring: Olga Bodrova; Valery Stepanov; Yuliya Aug; Andrey Smolyakov
- Cinematography: Nikolai Zheludovich
- Edited by: Ivan Lebedev
- Production company: PLAN 9
- Distributed by: Planeta Inform
- Release dates: September 2021 (Kinotavr); December 9, 2021
- Running time: 124 minutes
- Country: Russia
- Language: Russian

Freeze Dance (Russian: Море волнуется раз, romanized: More volnuetsya raz) is a 2021 Russian teen drama film directed by Nikolay Khomeriki. The film received the grand prize of the Kinotavr festival in 2021.

== Plot ==
Sasha and Kolya are a young couple deeply in love, but their relationship is strained by Kolya's constant jealousy and Sasha's growing frustration. Seeking an escape from civilization, they venture into the remote mountains of the Krasnodar region, where they stumble upon an old, decrepit house in the woods. To confront their feelings and improve their relationship, they decide to stay in this unfamiliar home. However, Sasha is haunted by a secret that prevents her from fully enjoying their time together. Every night, she experiences the same vivid and frightening dream of her future: a life where she has a family and children, yet Kolya is absent, and a massive tidal wave ominously approaches the city she can see from her future apartment.

While exploring the area, Sasha and Kolya encounter a mysterious older couple living in an abandoned neighboring house, who strikingly resemble them but appear to be their future selves. This encounter proves to be pivotal for the young couple, prompting them to reflect on their relationship and consider the changes they need to make in their lives.

== Cast ==
- Olga Bodrova as Sasha
- Valery Stepanov as Kolya
- Yuliya Aug as Old woman
- Andrey Smolyakov as Old man
- Alexander Sotnikov as Andrey Vadimovich
