= Peace to Us in Our Dreams =

2015 film

- Film poster
- Directed by: Šarūnas Bartas
- Written by: Šarūnas Bartas
- Starring: Šarūnas Bartas
- Release dates: 20 May 2015 (Cannes); 9 October 2015 (Lithuania)
- Running time: 107 minutes
- Country: Lithuania
- Language: Lithuanian

Peace to Us in Our Dreams (Lithuanian: Ramybė mūsų sapnuose) is a 2015 Lithuanian drama film written, directed by and starring Šarūnas Bartas. It was screened in the Directors' Fortnight section at the 2015 Cannes Film Festival.

== Cast ==
- Šarūnas Bartas
- Lora Kmieliauskaitė
- Ina Marija Bartaitė
- Edvinas Goldšteinas
- Giedrius Nakas

== Awards ==
2016: Golden Crane: Best Feature Film of the Year.
