= Harutyun Khachatryan =

Harutyun Khachatryan Հարություն Խաչատրյան
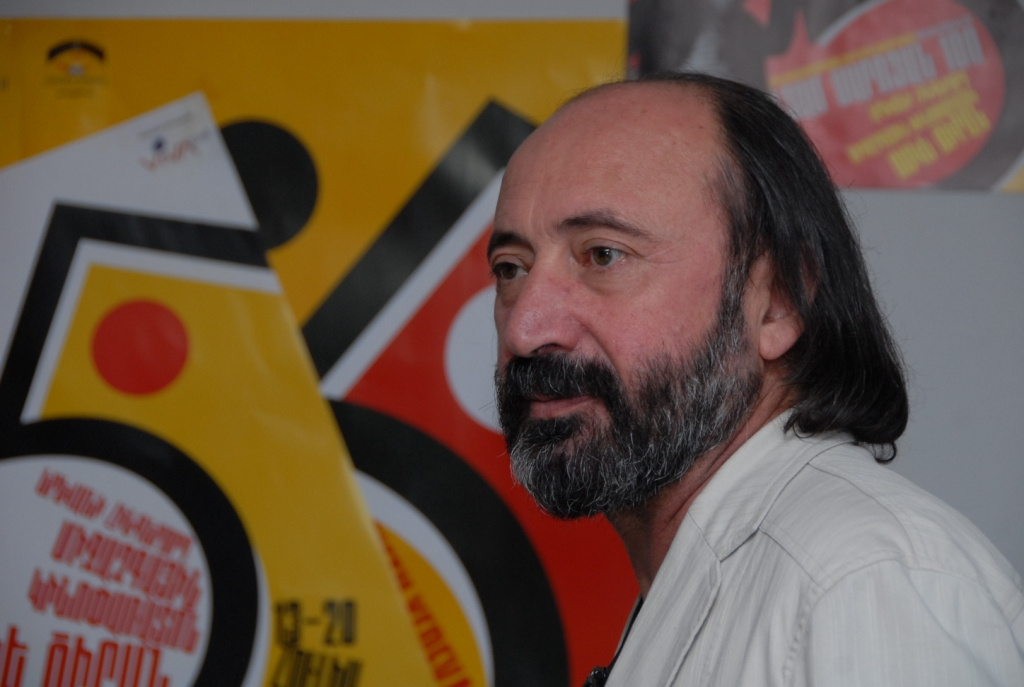
- Harutyun Khachatryan at 5th Golden Apricot International Film Festival
- Born: January 9, 1955 (age 71); Akhalkalaki, Georgian SSR
- Citizenship: Soviet Union; Armenia
- Occupations: Film director, screenwriter, film producer
- Years active: 1981–present
- Organization: Yerevan International Film Festival
- Awards: Khorenatsi medal Ordre des Arts et des Lettres Lenin Komsomol Prize

Harutyun Khachatryan (Armenian: Հարություն Ռուբենի Խաչատրյան, Russian: Арутюн Рубенович Хачатрян; born 9 January 1955) is an Armenian film director, script writer, director of photography, film producer, General director of the Golden Apricot Yerevan International Film Festival, Meritorious Artist of the Republic of Armenia and voting Member of European Film Academy since 2006.

== Biography ==
Harutyun Khachatryan was born on January 9, 1955, in Akhalkalak (Georgian SSR, now Georgia). 1981 the future director graduated from the Film Department of Cultural Faculty of the Armenian State Pedagogical Institute in Yerevan, Armenia. Worked as an assistant director and film-director at the Armenian Documentary Studio and later - at Hayfilm/Armenfilm Studio. 2003 Kachatryan was awarded by State Premium of Armenia and became Meritorious Artiste of Republic of Armenia.

2007 – received Prince Claus Award (The Netherlands).

2008 – Awarded by the Medal of “Movses Khorenatsi” by Armenian Government

2008 – Awarded by CHEVALIER DE L’Ordre des Arts et de Lettres by Ministry of Culture and Communications of French Republic. His films won many prizes at various International film festivals.

2010 - The Nilsson Award of the American Independent Filmmakers Alliance.

The Retrospectives of Harutyun Khachatryan have been shown in a number of international film festivals around the world: Moscow IFF, Tbilisi IFF, Melbourne International Film Festival, Telluride Film Festival, Documenta Madrid IFF, Cinema Planet IFF in Mexico, Cinema South IFF in Israel, as well as in Italy and Slovenia.

== Filmography ==
- 1981 - The Voices of the District / Mer Taghi Dzaynere, doc., 8 min.
- 1985 - Hosted by the Commander / Hyurenkalelov Hramanatarin, co-dir. (along with N.Hovhannisyan), doc., 16min.
- 1985 - Chronicle of a Case / Mi Eghelutyan Khronika, doc., 35 min.
- 1986 - Three Rounds From Vladimir Yengibaryan's Life / Erek Raund Engibaryani Kyankic, doc., 36min.
- 1987 – Kond / Kond, doc., 34 min.

Festivals and Prizes

1. First Prize at Young Film¬Makers Festival, Moscow, Russia, 1987;
2. First Prize for the Best Documentary Film at “Molodost” IFF, Ukraine, 1987;
3. Honourable Mention by the Jury at 20th Nyon International Documentary Film Festival, Switzerland, 1988;
4. Prize for the Best Documentary, Festival of Festivals, Kazakhstan, 1988;
5. Prize for the Best Documentary Film at Sverdlovsk Documentary Film Festival, Russia, 1988;• “The Best Film of the Year” Prize at Tbilisi Film Festival, Georgia, 1988.
6. Lenin Komsomol (Young Communist League) Award, 1989.
- 1988 - White Town / Spitak Kaghak, doc., 37 min.

Festivals and Prizes

1. “Sesterce D’Argent” Award at 21st Nyon International Documentary Film Festival, 1989;
2. Special Mention, Paris Film Festival (1989);
3. Lenin Komsomol (Young Communist League) Award, 1989.
- 1989 - The Wind of Emptiness (The Wind of Oblivion) / Kamin Unaynutyan, 90min.

Festivals and Prizes

1. Scheduled for AFI film Festival in Los Angeles, June 1992, and Kennedy Center, Washington, July 1992;
2. Presented in Montreal, Boston and Paris international film festivals;
3. Scheduled for Retrospective of Armenian Cinema at Pompidou Center, Paris, June¬October 1993.
- 1991 - Return to the Promised Land / Veradardz Avetyats Erkir, 87 min.

Festivals and Prizes

1. Three prizes including Ecumenical Jury Award at International Festival “Message to Man”, St. Petersburg, 1993;
2. “White Elephant” Russian Film Critics Guild's Award, 1993.
3. Special Prize at Gyor International Festival, Hungary, May 1993;
4. The Best Director Award at “Armenia¬Russia” Film Festival, Kapan, Armenia, 2000;
5. “The Best Film of the 90s”, Armenian Film Critics Award, 2002;
6. Scheduled for AFI film Festival in Los Angeles, June 1992 and Kennedy Center. Washington, July 1992; 26th Nyon International
7. Documentary Film Festival, 1993; for retrospective of Armenian Cinema at Pompidou Center, Paris, June–October 1993.
- 1994 - The Last Station / Verjin Kayaran, 90 min.

Festivals

Scheduled for Rotterdam IFF, Paris IFF, Los Angeles IFF, Montreal IFF, Cairo IFF, and London IFF.

- 2003 – Documentarist / Vaveragrogh, 62 min.

Festivals and Prizes

1. Documentary Jury's Special Mention at Karlovy Vary IFF, 2003;
2. Awarded by the State Premium of Armenia;
3. Nominated for Nika Award – Russian Cinema Academy Award 2003 as the best foreign film;
4. “The Best Film”, Armenian Film Critics Award, 2003;
5. Film-Press Prize at Listapad IFF, Minsk, Belarus, 2003;
6. Best Director Prize at Arsental International Film Forum, Riga, Latvia, 2004;
7. Jury Special Prize, IFF Smolensk, Russia, 2004.

Selected for the following film festivals: Montreal WFF, 2003 (CINEMA OF ASIA Program); Rotterdam IFF (Main Feature Program, 2004); Goteborg IFF (Cinemania Program); Minneapolis IFF, USA, April 2¬17, 2004; “goEast” Wiesbaden IFF, 2004; Buenos Aires IFF, 2004; MEDIAWAVE IFF, Gior, Hungary, 2004; Festival of Festivals, St. Petersburg, July, 2004; 58th Edinburgh International Film Festival,18¬29 August 2004; Pusan IFF (WIDE ANGLE Program, 2004); ARSENAL International Film Forum, Riga, Latvia, 18 – 26 Sept., 2004; Stuttgart IFF, 2004; FESTIVAL RENCONTRES INTERNATIONALES PARIS/BERLIN, France, 28 Oct. – 04 Nov., 2004; ZINEBI Bilbao Doc.FF, Spain, 28 Nov. – 04 Dec., 2004; MedFilmFestival, Rome, Italy, November, 2004.

- 2006 – Return of the Poet / Poeti Veradardze, 84 min.

Festivals and prizes

2010 - Best Film, Kish International Film Festival (Iran) World Premiere in Rotterdam IFF 2006. Selected for the following film festivals: Karlovy Vary IFF, 2006; FID Marseille Film Festival, 2006; Edinburgh Film Festival, 2006; New Era Horizons, Poland, 2006; New Zealand International Film Festival, 2006; Melbourne IFF, Australia, 2006; “Didor” IFF, Tajikistan, Bucharest IFF, Romania (2007), Batumi IFF, Georgia (2007), Tbilisi IFF, Georgia (2007) and others.

- 2009 - Border / Sahman, 82 min.

Festivals and Prizes (2009)

1. WorldFest – Houston (USA) - REMI platinum award
2. Syracuse IFF (USA)- Best Feature Documentary
3. Kinoshok (Russia) - Best Film Director
4. Romania IFF](Romania) - Critics' Jury Special Mention
5. Antalya IFF (Turkey) - Grand Prix
6. Listapad Film Festival IFF (Belarus) - Special Prize from “Mir” TV Studio
7. Gijón IFF (Spain) - Best Non-Fiction
8. Tbilisi IFF (Georgia) - Award for Human Rights and Peace from the EU Monitoring Mission in Georgia
9. Kinoatelje (Italy) - Darko Bratina Awards – Best Film of the year
- 2010
1. Fribourg IFF (Switzerland) - FIPRESCI Award
2. Armenian President Award for the Best Art Work 2010

"Border" was nominated for the Nika Best foreign film award.

== Sources ==
- Harutyun Khachatryan awarded with Prince Claus Award
- Border at SPLIT IFF, Croatia
