= The Excursionist =

2013 Lithuanian drama film

The Excursionist (Lithuanian: Ekskursantė, "Excursionist Girl") is a 2013 Lithuanian historical drama film that dramatizes the story of an eleven-year old Lithuanian girl Marija who escapes from a Soviet deportation to Siberia. Directed by Audrius Juzėnas, with the screenplay of Pranas Morkus, it is the first Lithuanian non-documentary film about Soviet deportations. The plot is loosely based on a real-life story published in Komjaunimo tiesa (the Lithuanian edition of Komsomolskaya Pravda) in 1989. Film languages are Lithuanian and Russian. The name of the film refers to an episode when Marija pretends to be a Russian girl strayed from an excursion.

== Awards ==
- 2014 Silver Crane (Lithuanian Film Awards)
  - Wins: best screenplay (Pranas Morkus), best actress (Anastasija Marčenkaitė), best cameraman (Ramūnas Greičius)
  - Nominations: best film, best director, best supporting actor (Igor Savochkin), best supporting actress (Raisa Ryazanova)
- 2014 Nika Awards, Best Film of the CIS and Baltics; tied with Haytarma
- 2014: Special award at the 44th international children's and youth film festival "Giffoni", Italy
