= Akhtem Seitablayev =

Crimean Tatar actor, screenwriter and film director based in Ukraine

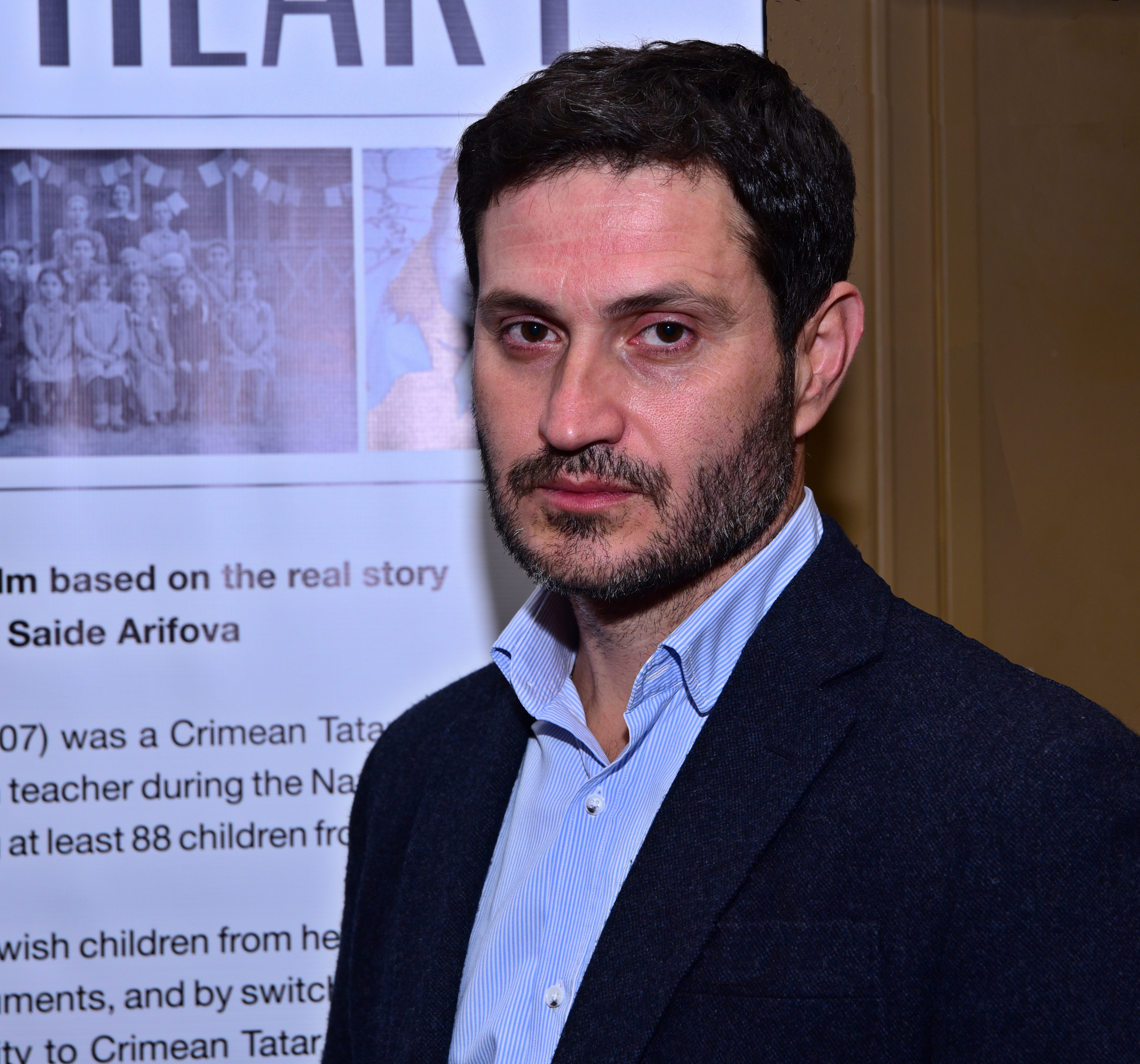
- Akhtem Seitablayev in Toronto (2018)
- Born: 11 December 1972 (age 53); Yangiyo‘l, Uzbek SSR
- Occupations: film director actor
- Years active: 1999 – present
- Notable work: Haytarma (2013); Cyborgs (2017); The Rising Hawk (2019)
- Children: 3

Akhtem Shevketovych Seitablayev (Crimean Tatar: Ahtem Şevket oğlu Seitablayev, Ukrainian: Ахтем Шевкетович Сеітаблаєв, Russian: Ахтем Шевкетович Сеитаблаев; born 11 December 1972) is a Ukrainian actor, screenwriter and film director of Crimean Tatar origin. He is the director of several high-profile films, including Haytarma in 2013, Cyborgs in 2017, The Rising Hawk in 2019, and Myrnyi-21 in 2023. He has expressed opposition to the annexation of Crimea by the Russian Federation and his films about the fate of several prominent Crimean Tatars have been praised throughout the former Soviet Union but criticized by hardline Russian nationalists.

== Early life ==
Seitablaiev was born in 1972 in Yangiyo‘l, then part of the Uzbek SSR. During the Stalinist period, his parents were deported by the Soviet authorities to Uzbekistan in the Sürgün since Crimean Tatars were one of the several ethnic groups to experience universal exile in the Stalin era. He attended school in Uzbekistan and remained in there with his family until they moved back to Crimea during the Perestroika era in 1989, where he began his film career in 1992 after graduating from the Crimean Cultural Enlightenment School.

== Career ==
From 1992 to 2004 he worked at the Simferopol State Crimean Tatar Theater, where he directed several plays including works of Alexander Pushkin. In 2005 he began working at the Kyiv Academic Theatre of Drama and Comedy on the left-bank of Dnieper. In 2009 he directed his first film, Quartet for Two. In 2013 he directed the movie Haytarma (English: Return) based on the real life of Amet-khan Sultan, a Crimean Tatar flying ace and twice Hero of the Soviet Union who witnessed the Sürgün but managed to avoid deportation due to his father's Lak ancestry and the intervention of Timofey Khryukin, commander of the 8th Air Army. The film was praised by the Kyiv Post as "must-see for history enthusiasts" and criticized by Komsomolskaya Pravda for depicting the NKVD officers doing the deportation as violent while portraying the deported women and children in a much more sympathetic light.

Russian consul in Crimea Vladimir Andreev said the film was "distorting the truth", and attacked the movie for being made by Crimean Tatars, who he said deserved to be deported, but he admitted that he did not actually watch the film, and based his opinion that the movie was inaccurate only because it was made by Crimean Tatars. However, Andreev's orders telling Russians invited to the film to not attend resulted in several Russian generals invited to the premiere cancelling, though some still saw it. Andreev's comments sparked a huge backlash that led to his resignation, while Seitablayev jokingly thanked Andreev for giving the movie free advertising.

In 2015, Seitablayev's family and film were featured in an Unreported World documentary about the Russian annexation of Crimea.

From 2016 to 2017 he directed Another's Prayer, based on the real life of Saide Arifova, a kindergarten director who saved over 80 Jewish children during the Holocaust by switching their ethnicity listing and teaching them to imitate Crimean Tatar customs and language to hide them from the Gestapo. Eventually the Nazis suspected she was involved in hiding Jewish children and tortured her, but she refused to betray any names. After the Red Army retook control of Crimea she saved them again by explaining to the NKVD that the children were Jewish, not Crimean Tatar, and hence were allowed to stay in Crimea instead of being deported to the desert. The film debuted on 18 May 2017, the anniversary of the Sürgün. Originally the film was supposed to be filmed in Crimea, but after the annexation of Crimea by the Russian Federation in 2014 it was decided that the filming would be done in mainland Ukraine and Georgia.

== Personal life and politics ==
On 29 May 2018, he released a statement in support of Oleg Sentsov, a film director arrested in Russian-controlled Crimea. He was married to actress Ivanna Diadiura, and has three children. He comes from a family of musicians on his mother's side; his mother Subiye was a teacher, actress, and singer who was deported from Crimea in 1944 but after returning in 1990 led the development of the first Crimean Tatar children's television program. His father Shevket, who was also deported from Crimea in 1944, served six months in Soviet prison in solitary confinement for supporting the Crimean Tatar National Movement. His eldest daughter Nazly is an actress, dancer, and model who also had a role in Haytarma. After the 2022 Russian invasion of Ukraine, he began serving in the Territorial Defense Forces of Ukraine.

== Awards ==
- Order "For Merits" III class - for significant personal contribution to state building, socio-economic, scientific and technical, cultural and educational development of Ukraine, significant labor achievements and high professionalism (August 24, 2017)
- Laureate of the State Prize of Crimea - for the role of Macbeth in the play "McDuff" ("McDuff" - the name of Shakespeare's play "Macbeth" in the Crimean Tatar version).
- Winner of the Kyiv Pectoral Theater Award for the role of Romeo in the play Romeo and Juliet.
- Nariman Aliyev's Ukrainian film "Home" was recognized as the best foreign film 7th International Bosphorus Film Festival, and Akhtem Seitablayev, who starred in the film, received the award for best male role.
- Winner of the Vasyl Stus Prize 2020.

== Filmography ==
=== Actor ===
Actor works
Year	Film	Role
2003	Mamay	Middle brother Umay
2004	Moskovskaya saga	(episode)
2004	Tatarskiy triptikh	Stambulskiy Sokhti / Rustem
2005	Muhtar's return-2	Safiullin
2005	Zoloti khloptsi	(episode)
2005	Navizhena	Security guy of parking lot
2006	Bohdan-Zynoviy Khmelnytskyi	
2006	Muhtar's return-3	Timur Khazov
2006	Zhinocha robota z ryzykom dlia zhyttia	Artem Polonskyi
2007	Zhaha ekstrymu	Nikita
2008	Prityazhenie	Arkadiy (son of Aleksandr Nikolayevich)
2009	Osinni kvity	Meshochnik in a train
2011	Temni vody	(episode)
2012	Actor, or the Love not after playwright	(not finished)
2012	Svaty-6	Murat Vladlenovych (owner of Bukovel)
2012	Haytarma	Amet-khan Sultan
2015	Hvardiya	Tatar
2015	Tsentralna likarnya	Rustam Agalarov
2016	Ya z toboyu	Andriy
2016	Den nezalezhnosti. Vasyl Stus	Vasyl Stus
2016	Skhidni solodoshchi	Ibrahim
2016	Na liniyi zhyttia	Serhiy Zadorozhnyi
2017	Pravylo boyu	Person in black
2017	Chuzhaya molitva	
2018	Spisok zhelaniy	Leonid Kaufman (mayor)
2019	Homeward	Mustafa

=== Director ===
Director works
Year	Film
2013	Haytarma
2017	Cyborgs: Heroes Never Die
2017	Another's Prayer
2019	The Rising Hawk (with John Wynn)
2023	Myrnyi-21
