= Sadyk Sher-Niyaz =

Sadyk Sher-Niyaz (/səˈdɪk ˌʃɛər niˈæz/ sə-DIK SHAIR nee-YAZ; Kyrgyz: Садык Шер-Нияз [sɑˈdɯχ ˌʃer niˈjɑs]) is a Kyrgyz director and producer, best known for his work on the film Kurmanjan Datka: Queen of the Mountains.

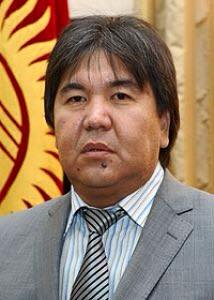
Sadyk-Sher Niyaz

== Biography ==
Sadyk Sher-Niyaz was born in the village of Chon-Kapka, Talas region, Kyrgyzstan. An ethnic Kyrgyz, Sher-Niyaz is married, the father of three children. At the age of 38 he left Kyrgyzstan to attend High Courses for Scriptwriters and Film Directors in Moscow. His first feature film, Kurmanjan Datka: Queen of the Mountains, was the Kyrgyz submission for Best Foreign Language Film at the 87th Academy Awards.

Sher-Niyaz is the founder of several organizations, including Aitysh Public Fund, "Kalemger" Literary Club, and Film Production Company Aitysh Film. In 2011, he started the Kyrgyzstan-Land of Short Films. Later in 2011, Sher-Niyaz became the Chairman of the Union of Cinematographers of Kyrgyzstan; he was re-elected to the position in January 2015. In 2012, he became one of the founders of the Ak Ilbirs Awards Later in 2011, Sher-Niyaz became the Chairman of the Union of Cinematographers of Kyrgyzstan, and was again re-elected to the position January 2015.

In late 2014, Sher-Niyaz founded the Asian World Film Festival in Los Angeles, California. According to The Wrap, Sher-Niyaz created the Festival to help other Asian filmmakers in their Oscar campaigns: ″'I created the Asian World Film Festival to fill a void that I noticed was missing in America. There is a wealth of underrated filmmakers from our region that deserve recognition and this festival was designed to champion and promote them,' festival chairman and creator Sadyk Sher-Niyaz said.″

== Education ==
- 2007–2009. - High Courses for Scriptwriters and Film Directors in Moscow (workshop Vladimir Khotinenko, Pavel Finn, Vladimir Fenchenko )
- 1994-2000 - Kyrgyz National University (KNU), Department of Law
- 1983-1987 - Frunze Engineering College, Technician

== Political activity ==
- 2021- First Ambassador of Kyrgyzstan to France (with residence), Permanent Delegate of Kyrgyzstan to UNESCO
- 2021 Participated in the presidential elections (withdrew his candidacy after |negotiations with Sadyr Japarov, who later became the President of the Kyrgyz Republic)
- 2015-2020 deputy of the Parliament of Kyrgyzstan
- 2014 Sher Niyaz was nominated to the post of Minister of Culture
- 2010 - Minister of Culture and Information of the Kyrgyz Republic
- 2005 - Member of the State Commission for the stabilization of the political situation in the Kyrgyz Republic
- 2004-2007 – Elected to the Parliament Deputy Ombudsman (Akyikatchy)

== State awards and titles ==
- Order of Manas I degree (2023) (Kyrgyzstan)
- Order of Friendship II degree (2021) (Kazakhstan)
- The Dank (Glory) medal (2015) (Kyrgyzstan)
- State Prize of the Kyrgyz Republic named after Toktogul in the field of literature, art and architecture for historical epic film Kurmanjan Datka (2017) (Kyrgyzstan)
- Honored Worker of Culture of the Kyrgyz Republic (2011) (Kyrgyzstan)
- Certificate of Honor of the Kyrgyz Republic (2006) (Kyrgyzstan)
- Gold Medal of TÜRKSOY for precious contribution to art and culture in the Turkic World (2022)
- The Honorary Citizen of the city of Culver City, Los Angeles (2019) (USA).
- The Honorary Citizen of the Manas region (2015) (Kyrgyzstan)

== Filmography ==
Film	Year	
Pars (Son"s Duty)	2007	Producer and Writer
The Salt	2011	Producer
Kurmanjan Datka: Queen of the Mountains	2014	Director and Writer
