= Leos Carax =

French director and writer (born 1960)

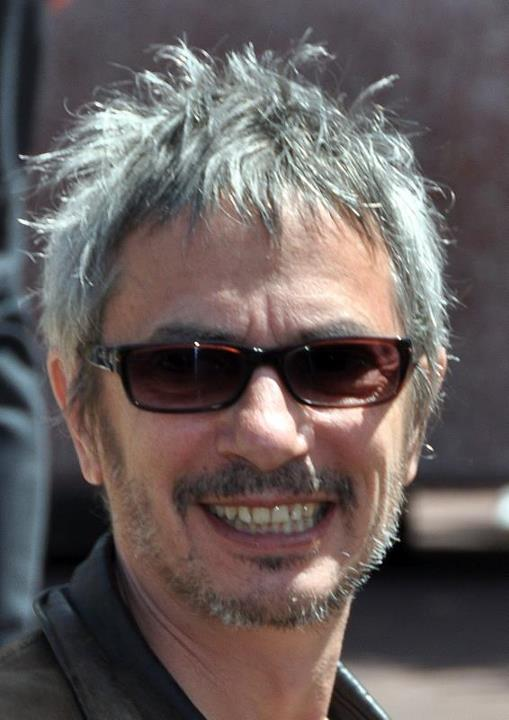
- Carax at the 2012 Cannes Film Festival
- Born: Alex Christophe Dupont; 22 November 1960 (age 65); Suresnes, Hauts-de-Seine, France
- Occupations: Film director; critic; actor; screenwriter
- Years active: 1984–present

Alex Christophe Dupont (Note: Some sources say Carax was born Alexandre Oscar Dupont, but a review addendum published in The New York Times in 2012 reads: "A film review on Wednesday about Holy Motors, using information from a publicist, misstated the original name of the director, Leos Carax. He was born Alex Christophe Dupont, not Alexandre Oscar Dupont.") (born 22 November 1960), best known as Leos Carax (French: [leɔs kaʁaks]), is a French film director, critic, and writer. Carax is noted for his poetic style and his tortured depictions of love. His first major work was Boy Meets Girl (1984), and his notable works include Les Amants du Pont-Neuf (1991), Pola X (1999), Holy Motors (2012) and Annette (2021). For the latter, he won the Best Director prize at the 2021 Cannes Film Festival.

== Early life ==
Carax was born Alex Christophe Dupont in Suresnes, Hauts-de-Seine, a commune in the suburbs of Paris, France. His father is French science journalist George Dupont, and his mother, Joan, is an American film journalist who wrote for the International Herald Tribune.

== Career ==
Carax's film career began with a series of short films, and as a film critic, before he released Boy Meets Girl (1984), which established his reputation for a mature visual style. It also saw the first grouping of Carax with Denis Lavant and cinematographer Jean-Yves Escoffier. His next film was Mauvais Sang (literally Bad Blood but mostly known as The Night is Young) in 1986, which alienated some of his audience, but continued to explore the complexities of love in the modern world, this time through a darker, more criminal viewpoint. The work was clearly an homage to French New Wave cinema, and his use of such actresses as Juliette Binoche was a tribute to his influences, especially Jean-Luc Godard. The film was entered into the 37th Berlin International Film Festival.

Five years later, Carax returned to directing with Les Amants du Pont-Neuf, an expensive undertaking as Parisian authorities granted him only 10 days to film on Pont Neuf. His initial reaction to the problems of filming on a public bridge had been to construct a model of the bridge in the community of Lansargues, in Southern France. But on the first day of filming Lavant severely injured his thumb, which pushed the movie back by a month. Subsequent financial difficulties further pushed filming over a much longer period than intended. The movie was released to critical acclaim and opened the door for Carax to enter more experimental waters with his fourth feature, Pola X (1999), an adaptation of Herman Melville's Pierre: or, The Ambiguities.

Carax's 2012 film Holy Motors also stars Lavant. The film competed for the Palme d'Or at the 2012 Cannes Film Festival.

In 2017, Carax performed vocals and accordion on the track "When You're a French Director" on Sparks's album Hippopotamus.

In 2021, Carax directed Annette, a music-filled drama feature film written by Sparks and starring Adam Driver and Marion Cotillard, for which he won the Cannes Film Festival Award for Best Director at the 2021 Cannes Film Festival.

In 2024, Carax starred in the short film An Urban Allegory, directed by Alice Rohrwacher and JR, which premiered out of competition at the 81st Venice International Film Festival.

== Filmography ==
=== Feature film ===
Year	English title	Director	Writer
1984	Boy Meets Girl	Yes	Yes
1986	Mauvais Sang	Yes	Yes
1991	Les Amants du Pont-Neuf	Yes	Yes
1999	Pola X	Yes	Yes
2012	Holy Motors	Yes	Yes
2021	Annette	Yes	No
2027	Lily May B	Yes	Yes

=== Short film ===
Year	Title	Director	Writer	Producer	Notes
1980	Strangulation Blues	Yes	Yes	No	
1997	Sans Titre	Yes	Yes	No	Prologue to Pola X
2006	My Last Minute	Yes	Yes	No	
2008	Merde	Yes	Yes	No	Segment of Tokyo!
2010	Naked Eyes	Yes	Yes	No	Segment of 42 One Dream Rush
2014	Gradiva	Yes	No	No	
2024	It's Not Me	Yes	Yes	Yes	

=== Acting roles ===
Year	Title	Role	Notes
1986	Mauvais Sang	Le voyeur du quartier	Uncredited
1987	King Lear	Edgar	Uncredited
1997	The House		
2004	Process	Un médecin	
2006	977	Technic	
2007	Mister Lonely	Renard	
2008	Je ne suis pas morte	Moitié d'archange	
2012	Holy Motors	Le Dormeur and Voix Limousine	Credited as "LC"
2024	It's Not Me	LC	
2024	An Urban Allegory	The Director	

=== Music video ===
Year	Title	Artist
2002	"Quelqu'un m'a dit"	Carla Bruni
2003	"Tout le monde"	Carla Bruni
2005	"Crystal" (alternative version)	New Order
