= Seven Invisible Men =

- Directed by: Šarūnas Bartas
- Written by: Šarūnas Bartas
- Produced by: Šarūnas Bartas; Paulo Branco
- Cinematography: Šarūnas Bartas
- Edited by: Niels Dekker
- Music by: Vytautas Leistrumas
- Release dates: 17 May 2005 (Cannes); 5 November 2005
- Running time: 119 minutes
- Country: Lithuania
- Language: Russian

Seven Invisible Men (Lithuanian: Septyni nematomi žmonės) is a 2005 Lithuanian drama film directed by Šarūnas Bartas. It tells the story of a group of Russian outcasts and criminals who travel in a stolen car and behave dysfunctionally and irresponsibly, eventually clashing with the surrounding world. The film was a co-production between companies in Lithuania, France and Portugal.

It premiered in the Directors' Fortnight section of the 2005 Cannes Film Festival. It was nominated for the 2005 Nika Award for Best Feature Film.

== Cast ==
- Dmitriy Podnozov as Vanechka
- Rita Klein as Masha
- Aleksandre Saulov as Pasha
- Saakanush Vanyan as Mila
- Denis Kirillov as Bobik
- Igor Cygankov as Karpusha
