= Haytarma =

- Directed by: Akhtem Seitablaiev
- Written by: Mykola Rybalka
- Produced by: Lenur Isliamov; Ivanna Diadiura
- Starring: Akhtem Seitablaiev; Oleksiy Horbunov
- Cinematography: Volodymyr Ivanov
- Music by: Dzhemil Karikov; Serhiy Kutsenko
- Release date: 2013
- Running time: 90 minutes
- Country: Ukraine
- Languages: Russian; Crimean Tatar
- Budget: $1,500,000

Haytarma (Crimean Tatar: Qaytarma, lit. 'return, homecoming', Russian: and Ukrainian: «Хайтарма») is a 2013 Ukrainian period drama film. It portrays Crimean Tatar flying ace and Hero of the Soviet Union Amet-khan Sultan against the background of the 1944 deportation of the Crimean Tatars. Haytarma means "return", but is also the name of the most popular Crimean Tatar national dance.

The film premiered on May 17, 2013, in Simferopol. It received widespread critical acclaim in Ukraine and abroad, was screened at the Odesa International Film Festival, and was Ukraine's submission for the Academy Award for Best Foreign Language Film.

== Plot ==
The film recounts a date in the history of the Crimean Tatar people—May 18, 1944—the day the Soviet operation to deport Crimean Tatars from their homeland began. At the center of the story is Amet-Khan Sultan, a fighter pilot, Guards Major, and twice-named Hero of the Soviet Union.

The events of the film begin on May 9, 1944, at an airfield on the outskirts of Sevastopol. The Great Patriotic War is underway, and Soviet forces are completing the liberation of Crimea from Nazi troops. During an aerial battle over Sevastopol, Amet-Khan's friend and wingman, the pilot Andrei, is killed. On May 16, 1944, following the liberation of Sevastopol, Amet-Khan Sultan—accompanied by his fellow frontline soldiers Vovka and François—heads to his native Alupka for a three-day leave, where he reunites with his numerous relatives. Then, at 4:00 a.m. on May 18, 1944, he witnesses the operation to deport his own people—the Crimean Tatars—from Crimea, including all his loved ones.

== Cast ==
- Akhtem Seitablaev as Guard Major, Military Fighter Pilot Amet-Khan Sultan
- Oleksiy Gorbunov as Major-Private Krotov
- Valery Shitovalov as father of Amet-Khan
- Usnie Khalilova as Nasibe, mother of Amet-Khan
- Yuri Tsurilo as General of the Special Department Vasiliev
- Nikolai Boklan as Guard Lieutenant Colonel Grigory Nikolaevich
- Andrey Saminin Vovka as Vladimir Naryshkin frontline comrade Amet-Khan Sultan
- Andrei Mostrenko as François de Jofre (from Normandy), frontline comrade of Amet-Khan Sultan
- Dmitry Surzhikov as Captain NKVD Trunin
- Daniel Belykh as Lieutenant Special Branch
- Guram Bablishvili as Martik
- Dinara Avaz as Feride
- Nazly Seitablaeva as Miaser sister Amet-Khana
- Alexey Tritenko as Mechanic Vanya
- Rasim Yusupov as Old man
- Lesya Samaeva as Russian neighbor

== Production and release ==
In 2004, Akhtem Seitablaev—an Honored Artist of the Autonomous Republic of Crimea born into a family of deported Crimean Tatars in Uzbekistan—conceived the idea of making a film about Amet-Khan Sultan: "He means a great deal to a Crimean Tatar. And, of course, as an actor, I wanted to play this hero. It is like a Scotsman playing William Wallace". Seitablaev served as both director and lead actor, while screenwriter Nikolai Rybalka wrote the script. Haytarma is the name of a traditional dance that symbolizes return.

Initially, the filmmakers hoped to secure funding in Turkey; however, Turkish representatives declined after reviewing the script. In 2012, Russian businessman Lenur İslâm— owner of Ukrainian television station ATR Channel and the Queen Group—stepped in to assist the creative team. İslâm's Crimean holdings included the transport company SimCityTrans, the Simferopol TV channel ATR, the radio stations Meydan and Lider, and the web portal crimeantatars.org. According to Seitablaev, İslâm had long dreamed of making a film about the deportation.

Production of the film began in October 2012 in Crimea. The initial budget for the film was US$2.5 million. İslâm provided the extras, weaponry, trains, vehicles, and aircraft of the era, investing approximately $1.5 million. Large-scale wartime sets were constructed in Bakhchysarai. Computer-generated imagery (CGI) and technical equipment for the shoot proved to be the most expensive elements. The team behind Timur Bekmambetov’s Night Watch and Day Watch worked on the battle scenes. Much expenditure was devoted to scenic design and costume design. According to director Akhtem Seitablaev, the film's total budget was approximately 9.26 million hryvnias. Filming took place in 2012 in Alupka and Sudak. Scenes set at an airfield were shot at the entrance to Bakhchysarai; a plywood aircraft was positioned there for the battle sequences and was later donated to the Amet-Khan Sultan Museum in Alupka. The night scene depicting the loading of people into train cars was filmed on the 9th auxiliary track of the Bakhchysarai railway station—not far from Syuren station, where the actual events of May 1944 had taken place. More than three thousand people from across Crimea participated in the crowd scenes depicting the deportation of the Crimean Tatars; approximately 700 of them had personally lived through the tragedy. Notably, Crimean Tatar theater actor Rasim Yunusov played a role closely mirroring his own grandfather—an elderly water carrier. In the deportation scene, one of the elderly men is shown hauling a sewing machine on his shoulder amidst the chaos—the very same machine his mother had managed to grab at the last moment in 1944, and which saved their family from starvation in Uzbekistan.

During the filming of a scene in which the protagonist was to propose to his beloved while on horseback, the animal threw Akhtem Seitablaev; he sustained a severe collarbone injury—his eleventh injury on a film set. This incident forced a significant reduction in the romantic storyline between Amet-Khan and Feride.

Haytarma was the first feature film to depict the history of the Crimean Tatar people. The film is dedicated to "the memory of grandfathers and great-grandfathers, fathers and mothers—all those without whom there would be no us, no children of ours, no memory, and no culture." Haytarma is also the first feature-length film produced by the production studio of ATR, the first Crimean Tatar TV channel. A preview of the film was released in March 2013. The premiere was scheduled for 18 May 2013, the 69th anniversary of the deportations; Amet-Khan's granddaughter Veronika, Soviet Air Force pilots, Russian generals, and ambassadors of foreign countries were invited to attend.

=== Musical Score ===
The film's musical score was performed by the Honored Academic Symphony Orchestra of the National Radio Company of Ukraine (conducted by Volodymyr Sheiko) and the ATR TV and Radio Company ensemble, led by Dzhemil Karikov. The soundtrack was released by Qartbaba Production in 2014 and includes 18 tracks featured in the film, as well as several Crimean Tatar folk melodies. The composers were Serhiy Krutsenko (primary orchestral score) and Dzhemil Karikov (ethnic music based on folk compositions). The album was recorded at the First Recording Company studio; the sound engineer was Maks Hladetskyi, and the conductor was Volodymyr Sheiko.

== Reactions ==
The film premiered on May 17, 2013, on the eve of the 69th anniversary of the deportation of the Crimean Tatar people. The news agency QHA announced the premiere using the bilingual names of Crimean cities: "Those interested can watch this film in Simferopol/Aqmescit and in Crimean cities such as Belogorsk/Qarasuvbazar, Kerch, Sevastopol/Aqyar, Sudak, Feodosia/Kefe, and Yevpatoria/Kezlev." The premiere of Haytarma was attended by Mejlis leaders and Ukrainian Verkhovna Rada deputies Mustafa Dzhemilev and Refat Chubarov; Deputy Prime Ministers of the Autonomous Republic’s government Georgy Psarev and Aziz Abdullaev; and a guest from Kyiv, Valery Patskan, head of the parliamentary committee on human rights. Military pilots and comrades-in-arms of Amet-Khan Sultan—twice named a Hero of the Soviet Union—were also invited from Moscow as guests of honor.

The Kyiv Post gave a positive review, describing Haytarma as a "must-see for history enthusiasts". In Simferopol, the Kosmos Cinema estimated that six thousand people had seen the film in the first week, and a thousand per day by 4 June; the cinema had begun with just two screenings per day, but added two additional ones in response to the unexpected demand. It was screened at the International Antalya Golden Orange Film Festival in October 2013. It was one of three films which made the Ukraine Oscar selection committee's shortlist to be submitted as a nominee in the Best Foreign Language Film category at the 86th Academy Awards.

The premiere of the film was immediately marred by controversy: security personnel at the Kosmos cinema barred entry to representatives of the Tatar public organization "Milli Firka," a group opposed to the Mejlis. Furthermore, it emerged that certain guests from Moscow failed to attend the screening; they had changed their minds after a conversation at the Russian Consulate General in Simferopol, where they were strongly advised against doing so. Vladimir Andreev, the Russian Consul in Simferopol provoked controversy following comments that the film "distorts the truth" by failing to mention alleged collaboration by Crimean Tatars during Nazi Germany's occupation of Ukraine. He told several Russian generals invited to the premiere to not attend, and said that the Crimean Tatars deserved to be deported, provoking a massive backlash. He later admitted that he "did not watch [Seitablaev’s] film", but knew it was "based on falsified history because it was produced by Crimean Tatars", stating:

"If this were a miniseries—say, 20 episodes long—where 17 episodes focused on the heroism of the Soviet people, Soviet soldiers, and legendary pilots during the Great Patriotic War; two episodes covered the collaboration of certain Crimean Tatars with the Nazi occupiers; and perhaps a final episode dealt with the deportation, the tragedy, and the crime committed by the Soviet leadership—then I would go see that film; I would watch all 20 episodes... so that the truth about the Great Patriotic War could be told, including those episodes that are, for some reason, hushed up. This film lacks them. It completely omits the theme of betrayal."

On 23 May 2013, about 300 people held a protest outside the consulate demanding that Andreev be declared persona non grata, while the Ukrainian Ministry of Foreign Affairs described Andreev's remarks as "inappropriate". Andreev initially stood by his Tatarophobic remarks and refused to retract them, but the following day the Russian Ministry of Foreign Affairs also described Andreev's words as "inappropriate" and "incorrect". Eventually he resigned in anger that the Russian government had not supported his comments.

Andreev was later supported by Sergey Aksyonov, leader of the Russian Unity party, who stated the Mejlis enjoyed the backing of the majority of Ukrainian liberal media: "It is quite obvious that an anti-Russian front is currently taking shape in Crimea and Ukraine, built upon a distortion of the truth. And it is very gratifying that Russia has politicians like Vladimir Andreev who stand up for our historical truth". The film’s director, Akhtem Seitablaev, stated that Vladimir Andreev had "condemned the film without knowing the subject matter," yet he was also "grateful for the tremendous publicity he generated for our picture".

Galina Sapozhnikova, a columnist for Komsomolskaya Pravda, wrote that the film was a major success across Crimea: "Everyone leaves the screening with teary eyes. It would be foolish to ask if the deportation affected their specific families, because it affected everyone without exception." In her view, the film represents a form of "propaganda of the heart" (as it is beneficial for everyone to witness the "savagery of the Stalinist deportation" as it actually occurred); however, the film also contains significant omissions—such as the service of Crimean Tatars in the Wehrmacht, their clashes with Soviet partisans, and the case of Amet-Khan’s younger brother, Imran, who served in the police force and was tried by a military tribunal. She also points out a number of clichés, such as a scene where a Soviet soldier sets a German shepherd on a fleeing young woman—a depiction typically reserved for SS troops in Soviet cinema.

According to Crimean political analyst Andrey Malgin, Director General of the Central Museum of Taurida, the film symbolized the fact that "Crimean Tatars are currently experiencing a period of historical optimism—they have returned home"—and that the conflict is shifting from the level of armed confrontation to the aesthetic realm. On September 9, 2013, the film was presented at the Kazan International Festival of Muslim Cinema; however, it was not included in the competition lineup, even though there had originally been plans for it to open the festival. The organizers changed their decision following a call from the Russian Foreign Ministry, which advised against screening the film in the competition. Sergei Lavrentyev, chairman of the selection committee, speculated that the Foreign Ministry was playing it safe due to a scandal that had previously occurred at a festival in Simferopol. A number of other experts surveyed by the Business Online newspaper shared this view. Consequently, the film, which drew a record audience, was screened out of competition, without the traditional post-screening discussion.

The film was criticized by Yuri Shevchuk of Harvard Ukrainian Research Institute Symposium for using "the language and iconography of the colonizers to communicate its message."

In 2014, while presenting the Nika film award to the movie in Moscow, Mikhail Shvydkoy—the Russian Presidential Special Representative for International Cultural Cooperation—stated that "art in general, and cinema in particular, is the most important thing in our lives; it is far more important than politics".

=== Awards ===
2013 — Winner of the National Union of Cinematographers of Ukraine award for "Best Film" and "Best Feature Film" of Ukraine in 2013;

2013 — Grand Prix at the Truskavets International Film Festival "Crown of the Carpathians";

2014 — Winner of the Russian national film award "Nika" for "Best Film from CIS and Baltic Countries" for 2013 (shared with the film The Excursionist (Lithuania));

2014 — Awards at the Kimera International Film Festival in Termoli, Italy, for "Best Director" and "Best Film";

2014 — Winner in the "Best Feature Film" category at the Trieste Film Festival in Italy.
