= Šarūnas Bartas =

Lithuanian film director

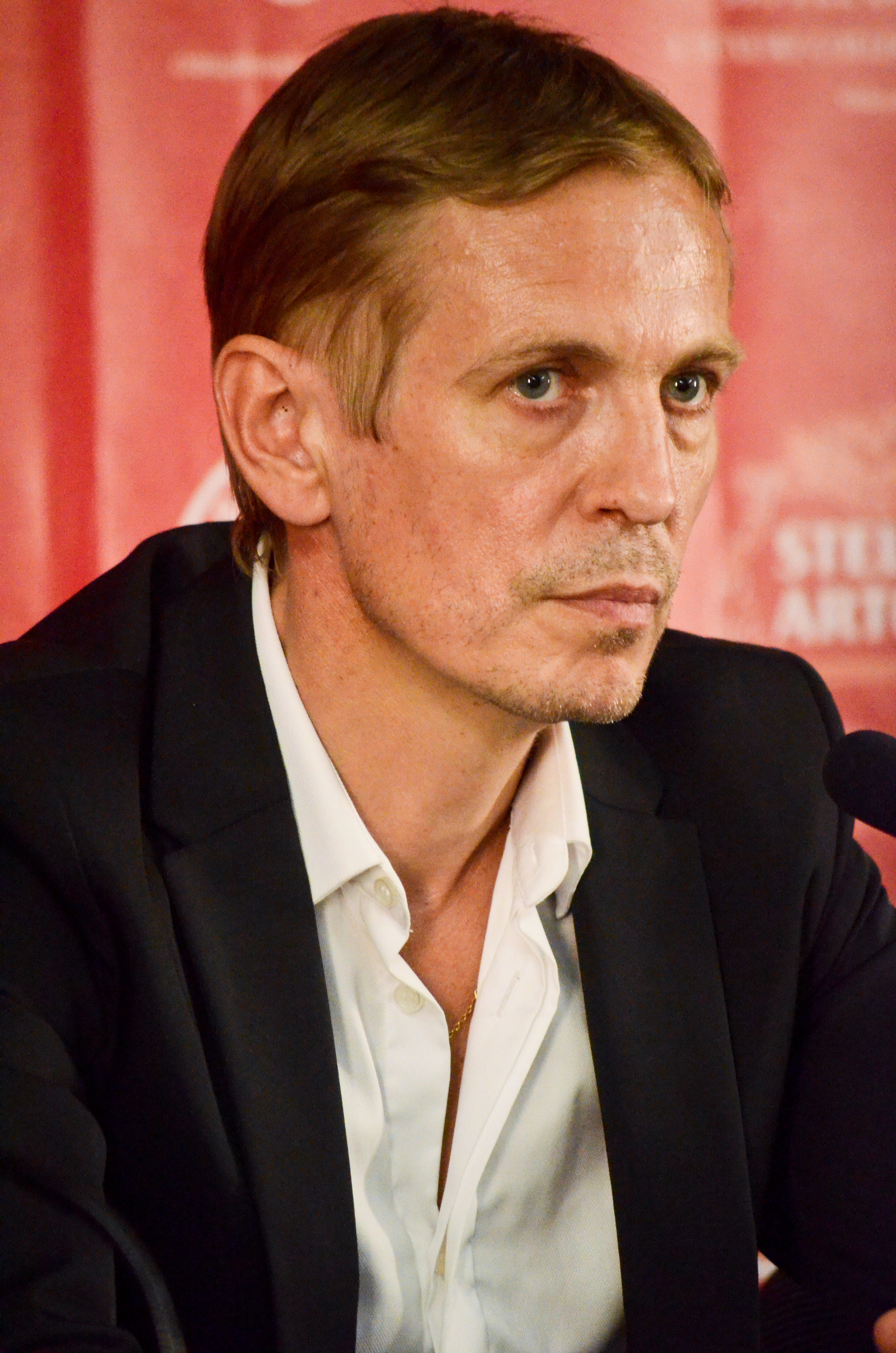
- Šarūnas Bartas at the Odesa International Film Festival 2015
- Born: 16 August 1964 (age 61); Šiauliai, Lithuanian SSR, Soviet Union
- Occupation: Film director
- Years active: 1986–present

Šarūnas Bartas (born 16 August 1964) is a Lithuanian film director. He is one of the most prominent Lithuanian film directors internationally from the late 20th century. His 2015 film Peace to Us in Our Dreams was screened in the Directors' Fortnight section at the 2015 Cannes Film Festival. His film In the Dusk was part of the official selection of the 2020 Cannes Film Festival.

== Filmography ==
- Tofolaria (1986, short film)
- In the Memory of a Day Gone By (Praėjusios dienos atminimui) (1990, documentary)
- Three Days (Trys dienos) (1991)
- The Corridor (Koridorius) (1995)
- Few of Us (Mūsų nedaug) (1996)
- The House (Namai) (1997)
- Freedom (Laisvė) (2000)
- "Children Lose Nothing" in Visions of Europe (2004)
- Seven Invisible Men (Septyni nematomi žmonės) (2005)
- Eastern Drift (Eurazijos aborigenas) (2010)
- Peace to Us in Our Dreams (Ramybė mūsų sapnuose) (2015)
- Frost (2017)
- In the Dusk (Sutemose) (2019)
- Back to the Family (2025), It competed in the Big Screen Competition section of the 54th International Film Festival Rotterdam to be screened in February 2025.
- Laguna (2025)

== Awards ==
- 1990 – Audience Award in International Documentary Film Festival Amsterdam, for "Praėjusios dienos atminimui"
- 1992 – FIPRESCI Prize – Honorable Mention and Prize of the Ecumenical Jury – Special Mention in Berlin International Film Festival, for "Trys dienos"
- 1995 – FIPRESCI Prize in Viennale, for "Koridorius"

C.I.C.A.E. Award in Torino International Festival of Young Cinema, for "Koridorius"

- 2000 – CinemAvvenire Award – Best Film on the Relationship Man-Nature, in Venice Film Festival, for Laisvė
