= List of Kyrgyzstani films =

This is a list of films produced in Kyrgyzstan.

== A ==
- Aku - 2014
- Altyn Kyrghol - 2001

== B ==
- Beket - 1995
- Beshkempir - 1998
- Bravo! - 2014

== C ==
- The Chimp (Maimil) - 2001

== D ==
- Down from the Seventh Floor - 2005

== E ==
- Ergii - 2001
- The Empty Home - 2012

== F ==
- A Father's Will - 2016
- Flowers of Freedom - 2014

== G ==
- Gde tvoy dom, ulitka? - 1992

== H ==
- Hassan Hussen - 1997
- Heaven Is Beneath Mother's Feet - 2024
- Heavenly Nomadic - 2015
- Hot Summer (Saratan) - 2004

== J ==
- Jamila - 1994

== K ==
- Kurmanjan Datka: Queen of the Mountains - 2014
- Kuday saktasyn - 2025

== L ==
- The Light Thief - 2010
- Lullaby - 2006

== M ==
- The Maestro of Mongolia - 2014
- Move - 2014

== P ==
- Penthouse - 2014
- Pure Coolness (Boz Salkyn) - 2007

== Q ==
- Queen of the Mountains - 2014

== R ==
- Running to the Sky - 2019

== S ==
- Sanzhyra - 2001
- Sel'kincek - 1993
- Silk Road Ghosts - 2014
- Soolugan Güldör - 2015
- Sultan Sulayman - 2014
- Sunduk predkov - 2006

== T ==
- Taranci - 1995
- The White Pony - 1999
- Thief in Love - 2009

== W ==
- The Wedding Chest - 2006

== See also ==
- List of Kyrgyz submissions for the Academy Award for Best Foreign Language Film
