= List of Kyrgyzstani submissions for the Academy Award for Best International Feature Film =

Best International Feature Film submissions from Kyrgyzstan

Highlights
- Debut: 1998
- Submissions: 19
- Nominations: none
- Oscar winners: none

Kyrgyzstan has submitted films to compete for the Academy Award for Best International Feature Film (Note: The category was previously named the Academy Award for Best Foreign Language Film, but this was changed to the Academy Award for Best International Feature Film in April 2019, after the Academy deemed the word "Foreign" to be outdated.) since 1999. The award is handed out annually by the United States Academy of Motion Picture Arts and Sciences to a feature-length motion picture produced outside the United States that contains primarily non-English dialogue.

The first-ever Kyrgyzstan film to be submitted for consideration was The Ferocious One (1974), a Kyrgyzstan production that was submitted by the Soviet Union in 1974, but was not nominated.

As of 2026, Kyrgyzstan has submitted nineteen films, but none of them were nominated.

== Submissions ==
Every year, each country is invited by the Academy of Motion Picture Arts and Sciences to submit its best film for the Academy Award for Best International Feature Film. The International Feature Film Committee oversees the process and reviews all the submitted films. Following this, they vote via secret ballot to determine the five nominees for the award.

The first-ever Kyrgyzstan film to be submitted for consideration was The Ferocious One (1974), a Kyrgyzstan production that was submitted by the Soviet Union in 1974, but was not nominated.

All the films submitted are primary in Kyrgyz. Below is a list of the films that have been submitted by Kyrgyzstan for review by the academy for the award since its conception.

Year (Ceremony)	Film title used in nomination	Original title	Language	Director	Result
1998 (71st)	Beshkempir: The Adopted Son	Бешкемпир	Kyrgyz	Aktan Abdykalykov	Not nominated
2001 (74th)	The Chimp	Маймыл	Kyrgyz, Russian	Aktan Abdykalykov	Not nominated
2006 (79th)	The Wedding Chest	Сундук предков	Kyrgyz, Russian and French	Nurbek Egen	Not nominated
2008 (81st)	Heavens Blue	Тенгри	Kyrgyz	Marie-Jaoul de Ponchville	Not nominated
2010 (83rd)	The Light Thief	Свет-Аке	Kyrgyz	Aktan Abdykalykov	Not nominated
2012 (85th)	The Empty Home	Пустой дом	Kyrgyz, Russian and French	Nurbek Egen	Not nominated
2014 (87th)	Queen of the Mountains	Курманжан Датка	Kyrgyz	Sadyk Sher-Niyaz	Not nominated
2015 (88th)	Heavenly Nomadic	Сутак	Kyrgyz	Mirlan Abdykalykov	Not nominated
2016 (89th)	A Father's Will	Atanyn Kereezi	Kyrgyz	Bakyt Mukul and Dastan Japar Uulu	Not nominated
2017 (90th)	Centaur	Kentavr	Kyrgyz	Aktan Abdykalykov	Not nominated
2018 (91st)	Night Accident	Tunku Kyrsyk	Kyrgyz	Temirbek Birnazarov	Not on the final list
2019 (92nd)	Aurora		Kyrgyz	Bekzat Pirmatov	Not nominated
2020 (93rd)	Running to the Sky	Жөө Күлүк	Kyrgyz	Mirlan Abdykalykov	Not nominated
2021 (94th)	Shambala	Шамбала	Kyrgyz and English	Artykpai Suyundukov	Not nominated
2022 (95th)	Home for Sale	Продается дом	Kyrgyz	Taalaibek Kulmendeev	Not nominated
2023 (96th)	This Is What I Remember	Эсимде	Kyrgyz	Aktan Abdykalykov	Disqualified
2024 (97th)	Heaven Is Beneath Mother's Feet	Бейиш - эненин таманында	Kyrgyz	Ruslan Akun	Not nominated
2025 (98th)	Black Red Yellow	Кара Кызыл Сары	Kyrgyz, Russian	Aktan Abdykalykov	Not nominated
2026 (99th)	Kassandra	Кассандра	Kyrgyz	Bekzat Pirmatov	Pending

== See also ==
- List of Academy Award winners and nominees for Best International Feature Film
- List of Academy Award-winning foreign language films
