= Cinema of Kyrgyzstan =

Produced feature films (2011)
- Total: 3

Gross box office (2011)
- Total: KGS 40,036,400

The cinema of Kyrgyzstan is part of the cinema of Central Asia.

== History ==
In 1998, Beshkempir, by Aktan Abdykalykov, won the Best Film Grand Prix at the 1st Eurasia International Film Festival, in Almaty, Kazakhstan. In 2005, at the 2nd Eurasia IFF, Saratan, by Ernest Abdyzhapparov, won the Special Jury Prize. In 2008, at the 5th Eurasia IFF, Unknown Route, by Temir Birnazarov, won the Special Feature Film Jury Award; Bridge, by Tina Ibragimov, and Debt, by Temir Birnazarov, won the Special Short Film Jury Award; Bolotbek Zhamshiev won the An Outstanding Contribution to World Cinema Art development award.

== Films ==
Year	Feature films produced
2007	1
2008	1
2009	1
2010	3
2011	3

== Directors ==
- Ernest Abdyzhapparov
- Aktan Abdykalykov
- Gennadi Bazarov
- Temir Birnazarov
- Izya Gershtein
- Tina Ibragimov
- Bakyt Karagulov
- Janysh Kulmambetov
- Tolomush Okeyev
- Bolotbek Zhamshiev

== Studios ==
- Kyrgyzfilm
