= Ak Ilbirs Awards =

Kyrgyz national film award

- Country: Kyrgyzstan, Bishkek
- Presented by: Ak Ilbirs Academy
- First award: 2012; 14 years ago
- Website: www.facebook.com/akilbirs2017/

Ak Ilbirs, National Film Awards in the Kyrgyz Republic, was established to recognize the best achievements in the cinema in the country and to stimulate the artistic growth of national cinema in all areas of filmmaking.

Film Award winners in each category are awarded statuettes of a snow leopard (ak Ilibris) a symbol of agility, luck and creative flight, sculpted by Sadyrbek Makeev.

The first film award ceremony of "Ak Ilbirs" was held on 27 October 2012.

== History ==
"Ak Ilbirs Awards" is held annually and takes place in the Kyrgyz Republic, awarding each year's winners in different categories. The main purpose of Ak Ilbirs Awards is to improve the quality of cinema, produced by national film production, as well as to provide an incentive for further development by selecting the best works in each category, approved by authority committee.

=== Founders of the "Ak Ilbirs" National Film Awards ===
1. Artykpay Suyundukov
2. Aktan Arym Kubat
3. Marat Sarulu
4. Sadyk Sher-Niyaz
5. Taalaibek Kulmendeev
6. Temir Birnazarov
7. Nurlan Abdykadyrov
8. Ernest Abdyjaparov

=== Management of the National Film Awards Ceremony ===
1. Directorate of the Ceremony consists of a Manager, Art director, Accountant and Administrator.
2. The Manager is accountable to the Directorate of the Founders of the National Film Awards and is responsible for conducting the National Film Ceremony.
3. Art director is accountable to the founders of the National Film Awards and is responsible for the selection of films nominated for the National Film Award.
4. Accountant reports to the Manager and is responsible for the financial activities of the National Film Awards ceremony.
5. The Administrator reports to the Manager and is responsible for conducting the ceremony of the National Film Awards.
6. The Manager has the right, according to estimates, to hire, as necessary, a technical and creative professionals for the award period of the ceremony.

=== Sources of Award Ceremony funding ===
1. Organization of the Ak Ilbirs Awards Ceremony are financed by personal contributions of the founder and partner support of individuals and entities, public and private initiatives, as well as International organization.
2. For the purposes of accounting and control of financial contributions and the optimal allocation of funds, the Organization Ceremony Founders established the General Executive Directorate of National Film Awards Ceremony.
3. The budget of the ceremony is set and approved by the founders of the National Film Awards on the basis of their confirmation on the schedule of the ceremony.

== Ak Ilbirs statuette ==
The Scythian snow leopard, made of gold and bronze in the first half of the 5th century. BC, was the inspiration for the statuette. It is made of bronze and black marble monolith, weighing 2.0 kg. The name of the National Film Award is carved on it in ancient Kyrgyz alphabet.

== Nominations ==
1. Best Film
2. Best Short Film
3. Best Documentary
4. Best Screenplay
5. Best Director
6. Best Cinematography
7. Best Artist
8. Best Composer
9. Best Sound
10. Best Actor
11. Best Actress
12. Best Producer
13. Audience Award
14. Best Film of Central Asia
15. Best Actor of Central Asia
16. Best Actress of Central Asia
17. Outstanding Contribution to National Cinema
18. Outstanding Contribution to World Cinema

=== Basic rules and criteria for the selection of nominees ===
- Any film of any genre, produced in the previous year, can be nominated for Ak Ilbirs National Film Awards.
- Anyone has right to apply for the Ak Ilbirs National Film Awards with films of any genre, produced in the previous year.
- Management of the ceremony registers each claimed film and organizes a screening for the members of the Kyrgyz Republic National Film Academy for rating.
- After viewing a film, Members of the Academy record their assessments according to a 10-point system on the Nominations column form (Best Picture, Best Cinematography, etc.) and sign. Upon request Members of the Academy can apply to sign their forms individually on a separate sheet. The Administration shall satisfy such a request only for valid reasons. Members of the Academy are deprived of the right to participate in the films' ratings if they are the director of the nominated movie. Members of the Academy have the right to submit three names in the "Outstanding Contribution to National Cinema" category. Evaluation forms are put into a sealed ballot box.
- The Ballot box containing the evaluation forms is opened on the day of delivery in the presence of the Founders of the National Film Awards and 2-3 representatives of the National Academy Awards. The calculated results are recorded, sealed in envelopes and announced only at the Awards Ceremony.

=== Date, place and format of the ceremony ===
- The deadline for nominations expires annually on 10 February.
- The evaluation forms shall be filled and signed no later than 15 March of the ceremony year.
- The ceremony takes place on 14 April at Manas Cinema Theater.

== Interesting facts ==
- Along with the National Film Awards Ak Ilbirs, a special award "Outstanding Contribution to National Cinema" and "Outstanding Contribution to World Cinema" was established.
- In order to promote Kyrgyz cinema, the founders of Ak Ilbirs National Prize announced a national "Perspective" competition for the best articles in the media about the Kyrgyz cinema.

Any article about Kyrgyz cinematography, film, or portraits of filmmakers published in the national media can participate in a competition.
The prize fund of 200 thousand soms was established by the General Partner of the "Perspective" contest, Aitysh Public Fund, and is distributed as follows:

1. "Grand Prix" – 75,000 Soms.
2. "The Best Analytical Article on Kyrgyz Cinema" – 55,000 Soms
3. "The Best Analysis of the Kyrgyz Film" – 35,000 Soms

Organization of Jury – 35,000 Soms

The contenders may send electronic versions of their articles with the title "Perspective" - Ak Ilbirs and a link to the published article. If it is printed, then provide the edition, where this article was published.
Articles published from 1 January to 30 April can participate in the competition.
The Award Ceremony of "Perspective" competition is held the day before Ak Ilbirs National Film Award Ceremony, in the first half of the May.
The Jury and assessment criteria are determined by the founders of the "Ak Ilbirs" National Film Awards
"Perspective"contestants cannot be members of the Jury.

== Original records ==
- Nomadic - 6 awards in 2012 (Best Film, Best Director, Best Screenplay, Best Cinematography, Best Sound, Best Editing)
- The Princess Nasik - 6 awards in 2013 (Best Film, Best Director, Best Screenplay, Best Cinematography, Best Artist, Best Actress)
- Salaam New York - 7 awards in 2014 (Best Film, Best Director, Best Screenplay, Best Editing, Best Artist, Best Composer, Audience Award)
- Kurmanjan Datka - 10 awards in 2015 (Best Film, Best Screenplay, Best Director, Best Cinematography, Best Editing, Best Actress, Best Actor, Best Composer, Best Sound, Audience Award)
- Heavenly Nomadic - 10 awards in 2016 (Best Film, Best Screenplay, Best Director, Best Cinematography, Best Artist, Best Editing, Best Actress, Best Actor, Best Composer, Best Sound)
- A Father's Will - 7 awards in 2017 (Best Film, Best Screenplay, Best Director, Best Cinematography, Best Artist, Best Editing, Best Actor)

== Winners ==
=== 2012 ===
- Best Picture: Nomadic, Dir.: Moldoseyit Mambetakunov and Artykpay Suyundukov
- Best Director: Dir. Moldoseyit Mambetakunov and Artykpay Suyundukov Nomadic
- Best Screenplay: Nomadic Moldoseyit Mambetakunov
- Best Cinematography: Stambulbek Mambetaliyev for Nomadic
- Best Artist: Eldiyar Madakim for How to Marry a Gu Jun Pyo?
- Best Composer: Nargiza Jalilova for How to Marry a Gu Jun Pyo?
- Best Sound: Marat Ergeshov for Nomadic
- Best Editing: Marat Ergeshov for Nomadic
- Best Actress: Zarema Asanalieva for Shahrezada of Kukushkino
- Best Actor: Eugene Rams for Shahrezada of Kukushkino

=== 2013 ===
- Best Picture: The Princess Nasik Kyrgyzfilm named after T.Okeev, dir. Erkin Saliyev
- Best Director: Dir. Erkin Saliyev for The Princess Nasik film
- Best Screenplay: The Princess Nasik, Erkin Saliyev
- Best Cinematography: Hassan Kydyraliev The Princess Nasik
- Best Artist: Erkin Saliyev for The Princess Nasik
- Best Sound: Ali Akhmadeev for Mezgil jana Alykul (Time and Alykul)
- Best Editing: Eldiyar Madakim for Mezgil jana Alykul (Time and Alykul)
- Best Actress: Aidai Salieva for The Princess Nasik
- Best Actor: Chyngyz Mamaev for Mezgil jana Alykul (Time and Alykul)
- Best Producer: Omurzak Tolobek for The President and the Homeless
- Best Documentary: Zaryl ishin bolboso, Zardalyda emne bar Kyrgyzs State Art Institute named after B.Beishenalieva, dir. Abdulalim Mamadaliev
- Best Short Fiction Film: Jymjyrt (Silence), Kyrgyzfilm named after T.Okeev, dir. Nargiza Mamatkulova
- Outstanding Contribution to Kyrgyz Cinema: Film Director Gennadiy Bazarov

=== 2014 ===
- Best Picture: Salam, New York, dir. Ruslan Akun
- Best Director: Ruslan Akun for Salam, New York
- Best Screenplay: Sergey Krolevich Ruslan Akun, Gulzhan Toktogulova for Salam, New York
- Best Cinematography: Akzhol Bekbolotov for Korgum Kelet
- Best Artist: Ruslan tokoch, Maksat Bolotbekov for Salam, New York
- Best Composer: Erlan Arstan, Ishimbekova Kerimbayev for Salam, New York
- Best Sound: Bakit Niyazaliev, Amanbek Mairambek uulu for Passion
- Best Editing: Eldiyar Madakim for Salaam, New York
- Best Actress: Kalipa Usenova for Passion
- Best Actor: Artik Suyundukov for Passion
- Best Documentary: The country in which we live, dir. Elnura Osmonalieva
- Best Short Fiction Film: Peregon dir. Ruslan Akun
- The Audience Award is given to the producer of the highest box office film. This Award was given to the Producer of the film Salam, New York, Nurbek Aybashov.
- Prize "Outstanding Contribution to the Kyrgyz Cinema" was awarded to Film Director Bolot Shamshiev

=== 2015 ===
- Best Picture: Kurmanjan Datka, dir. prod. Sadyk Sher-Niyaz
- Best Director: Sadyk Sher-Niyaz for Kurmanjan Datka
- Best Screenplay: Sadyk Sher-Niyaz, Bakytbek Turdubaev for Kurmanjan Datka
- Best Cinematography: Murat Aliev for Kurmanjan Datka
- Best Artist: Tolgobek Koychumanov for Aku
- Best Composer: Bakyt Alisherov, Murzali Zheenbaev for Kurmanjan Datka
- Best Sound: Bakit Niyazaliev for Kurmanjan Datka
- Best Editing: Eldiyar Madakim for Kurmanjan Datka
- Best Actress: Nazira Mambetova for Kurmanjan Datka
- Best Actor: Aziz Muradillaev for Kurmanjan Datka
- Best Documentary: Teacher, River and Gold, dir. Amanbek Ajymat
- Best Short Fiction Film: Topurak dir. Cholponay Borubaeva
- The Audience Award is given to the producer of the highest box office film. This Award was given to the Producer of the film Kurmanjan Datka, Zhyldyzkan Zholdosheva.
- Best Picture of Central Asia: The Hosts, dir. Adilhan Erjanov (Kazakhstan)
- Prize "Outstanding Contribution to the Kyrgyz Cinema" was awarded to Artist Sagynbek Ishenov
- Prize "Outstanding Contribution to the World Cinema" was awarded to Film Director Ali Hamraev

=== 2016 ===
- Best Picture: Heavenly Nomadic, prod. Sadyk Sher-Niyaz
- Best Director: Mirlan Abdykalykov for Heavenly Nomadic
- Best Screenplay: Ernest Abdyjaparov, Aktan Arym Kubat for Heavenly Nomadic
- Best Cinematography: Talantbek Akynbekov for Heavenly Nomadic
- Best Artist: Adis Seitaliev for Heavenly Nomadic
- Best Composer: Murzali Zheenbaev for Heavenly Nomadic
- Best Sound: Bakit Niyazaliev, Murat Ajiev for Heavenly Nomadic
- Best Editing: Eldiyar Madakim for Heavenly Nomadic
- Best Actress: Anara Nazarkulova for Heavenly Nomadic
- Best Actor: Tabyldy Aktanov for Heavenly Nomadic
- Best Documentary: Deti Chistoty, dir. Guzel Duyshonkulova
- Best Short Fiction Film: The Ring dir. Bakai Usenaliev
- The Audience Award is given to the producer of the highest box office film. This Award was given to the Producer of the film Birtuuganchik, 1.1 Studio
- Best Picture of Central Asia: House for Mermaids, dir. Yelkin Tuychiev (Uzbekistan)
- Prize "Outstanding Contribution to the Kyrgyz Cinema" was awarded to Cinematographer Nurtay Borbiev
- Prize "Outstanding Contribution to the World Cinema" was awarded to Actress Natalya Arinbasarova

=== 2017 ===
- Best Picture: A Father’s Will, prod. Gulmira Kerimova, Ermek Mukul
- Best Director: Bakyt Mukul, Dastan Zhapar uulu for A Father’s Will
- Best Screenplay: Dastan Zhapar uulu, Bakyt Mukul for A Father’s Will
- Best Cinematography: Akjol Bekbolotov for A Father’s Will
- Best Artist: Urmat Osmoev for A Father’s Will
- Best Composer: Murzali Zheenbaev for Munabia
- Best Sound: Kalybek Sherniyazov for Munabia
- Best Editing: Aktan Ryskeldiev for A Father’s Will
- Best Actress: Meerim Atantaeva for Munabia
- Best Actor: Iman Mukul for A Father’s Will
- Best Documentary: My Dreams will come true in Next Spring, dir. Aman Ajymat
- Best Short Fiction Film: Olgo dir. Bolsunbek Taalaybek uulu
- The Audience Award is given to the producer of the highest box office film. This Award was given to the Producer of the film Plan B, MBPRO studio
- Best Picture of Central Asia: The Path to Mother, dir. Akan Satayev (Kazakhstan)
- Best Actress of Central Asia: Feruza Saidova for Podrobnosti Oseni (Uzbekistan)
- Best Actor of Central Asia: Bahodur Miralibekov for The Dream of the Ape (Tajikistan)
- Prize "Outstanding Contribution to the Kyrgyz Cinema" was awarded to Writer Mar Baydjiev
- Prize "Outstanding Contribution to the World Cinema" was awarded to Film Director Hodjakuli Narliev

=== 2018 ===
- Best Picture: Centaur, prod. Oy Art Film Producing Company, Kyrgyzfilm
- Best Director: Aktan Arym Kubat for Centaur
- Best Screenplay: Aktan Arym Kubat, Ernest Abdyjaparov for Centaur
- Best Actress: Taalaikan Abazova for Centaur
- Best Actor: Azamat Ulanov for Finding Mother
- Best Editing: Eldiyar Madakim for Finding Mother
- The Audience Award is given for the highest box office film. This Award was received by Ruslan Akun, the Director of the film Finding Mother
