= Eurasia International Film Festival =

Eurasia International Film Festival is an international film festival held in Kazakhstan. With the exception of the fifth, held in Astana, all the editions were held in Almaty.

During the seventh festival in 2011, the Alley of Stars of Kazakh Cinema was inaugurated.

== Major award winners ==
Year	Best Film Grand Prix	Best Director	Best Male Performance	Best Female Performance
1998; 1st	(Kyrgyzstan) Beshkempir	(Kazakhstan) Serik Aprymov for Aksuat		Dalia Micheleviciute for Lunar Lithuania
2005; 2nd	(Ukraine) (Russia) The Tuner	(Russia) Alexander Sokurov for The Sun	(Japan) Issey Ogata for The Sun	(Russia) Alla Demidova for The Tuner
2006; 3rd	(Germany) (Switzerland) Eden	(China) Zhang Yuan for Little Red Flowers	(Japan) Masatō Ibu for Sway	(Iran) Ladan Mostofi for Goodnight Commander
2007; 4th	(Iran) (France) (Austria) (Iraq) Half Moon	(Russia) Alexei Popogrebski for Simple Things	(Russia) Leonid Bronevoy for Simple Things	(China) Fan Bingbing for Lost in Beijing
2008; 5th	(Kazakhstan) Farewell, Gulsary!	(Kazakhstan) Damiyar Salamat for Together with Father	(Uzbekistan) Diyas Rakhmatov for Little People (Kazakhstan) Bakhytzhan Alpeisov for Together with Father	(Kazakhstan) Irina Ageikina for Song from the Southern Seas
2010; 6th	(Kyrgyzstan) The Light Thief	(Turkey) Pelin Esmer for 10 to 11	(Russia) Andrey Merzlikin for Strayed	(Russia) Darya Gorshkaleva for Gastarbeiter
2011; 7th	(Japan) (Kazakhstan) Before the Storm	(Kazakhstan) Nariman Turebaev for Sunny Days	(Iceland) Theodór Júlíusson for Volcano	(Russia) Olga Simanova for Beduin
2012; 8th		(Turkey) Özcan Alper for Future Lasts Forever (Poland) Małgorzata Szumowska for Elles	(Russia) Azamat Nigmanov for The Convoy	(France) Anaïs Demoustier for Elles
2013; 9th	(Georgia (country)) (France) (Germany) In Bloom	(Kazakhstan) Serik Aprymov for Little Brother	(Italy) Carlo Cecchi for Miele (Singapore) Koh Jia Ler for Ilo Ilo	(Germany) Jördis Triebel for My Sisters (Iran) Elahe Hesari for Don't worry Sarah
2014; 10th	(Israel) Next to Her	(Iceland) Benedikt Erlingsson for Of Horses and Men	4 male actors for (Estonia) (Georgia (country)) Tangerines	(Georgia (country)) Tinatin Dalakishvili for Star
2015; 11th	(Kyrgyzstan) Heavenly Nomadic	(Azerbaijan) Elchin Musaoglu for Nabat	(Kazakhstan) Erzhan Nurymbet for Stranger	(Iran) Fatemeh Motamed-Arya for Nabat
2016; 12th	(Georgia (country)) (Croatia) (Spain) (Russia) House of Others	(Kazakhstan) Adilkhan Erjanov for The Plague at the Karatas Village	(Kazakhstan) Yury Pomarantsev for Once a Week	(France) Emmanuelle Devos for Moka
2017; 13th	(Kazakhstan) Returnee	(Kyrgyzstan) Aktan Abdykalykov for Centaur	(Azerbaijan) Gurban Ismailov for Pomegranate Orchard	(Georgia (country)) Ia Shugliashvili for My Happy Family
2018; 14th	(France) The Party's Over	(Bulgaria) (Germany) (France) Milko Lazarev for Aga	(Uzbekistan) Karim Mirkhadiyev for Perseverance	(Russia) Marta Kozlova for Anna’s War
2019; 15th	(Kazakhstan) The Secret of a Leader	(South Korea) Bong Joon-ho for Parasite	(Israel) Yoram Toledano for Echo	(France) Emilie Piponnier for Alice
