= List of submissions to the 85th Academy Awards for Best Foreign Language Film =

2012 Best Foreign Language Film submissions
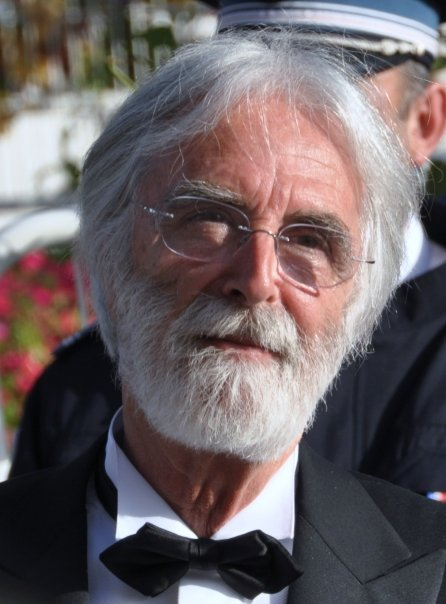
- Michael Haneke directed Amour, which won the year's award.

Highlights
- Oscar winner: (Austria) Amour
- Submissions: 73
- Debuts: 1
- Total eligible: 71

This is a list of submissions to the 85th Academy Awards for the Best Foreign Language Film. The Academy of Motion Picture Arts and Sciences (AMPAS) has invited the film industries of various countries to submit their best film for the Academy Award for Best Foreign Language Film every year since the award was created in 1956. The award is presented annually by the Academy to a feature-length motion picture produced outside the United States that contains primarily non-English dialogue. The Foreign Language Film Award Committee oversees the process and reviews all the submitted films.

For the 85th Academy Awards, the submitted motion pictures must have first been released theatrically in their respective countries between 1 October 2011 and 30 September 2012. The deadline for submissions to the Academy was 1 October 2012. 73 countries submitted films, and 71 were found to be eligible by AMPAS and screened for voters. Kenya submitted a film for the first time, while Cambodia made a submission for the first time since 1994. After the 9-film shortlist was announced on 21 December 2012, the five nominees were announced on 10 January 2013.

Austria won the award for the second time with Amour by Michael Haneke, which was also nominated for Best Picture, Best Director, Best Original Screenplay and Best Actress (Emmanuelle Riva).

== Submissions ==
Submitting country	Film title used in nomination	Original title	Language(s)	Director(s)	Result
Afghanistan	The Patience Stone	سنگ صبور	Dari	Atiq Rahimi	Not nominated
Albania	Pharmakon		Albanian	Joni Shanaj	Not nominated
Algeria	Zabana!	زبانة	Standard Algerian Amazigh, Arabic, French	Saïd Ould Khelifa	Not nominated
Argentina	Clandestine Childhood	Infancia clandestina	Spanish, Brazilian Portuguese	Benjamín Ávila	Not nominated
Armenia	If Only Everyone	Եթե բոլորը	Armenian, Karabakh Armenian, Russian	Nataliya Belyauskene	Not nominated
Australia	Lore		German, English, Russian	Cate Shortland	Not nominated
Austria	Amour		French, English	Michael Haneke	Won Academy Award
Azerbaijan	Buta		Azerbaijani	Ilgar Najaf	Not nominated
Bangladesh	Pleasure Boy Komola	ঘেটুপুত্র কমলা	Bengali, English	Humayun Ahmed	Not nominated
Belgium	Our Children	À perdre la raison	French, Arabic	Joachim Lafosse	Not nominated
Bolivia	Insurgents	Insurgentes	Spanish, Aymara, South Bolivian Quechua, Eastern Bolivian Guaraní	Jorge Sanjinés	Withdrawn
Bosnia and Herzegovina	Children of Sarajevo	Djeca	Bosnian	Aida Begić	Not nominated
Brazil	The Clown	O Palhaço	Brazilian Portuguese	Selton Mello	Not nominated
Bulgaria	Sneakers	Кецове	Bulgarian	Valeri Yordanov and Ivan Vladimirov	Not nominated
Cambodia	Lost Loves	ឃ្លាតទៅសែនឆ្ងាយ	Khmer	Chhay Bora	Not nominated
Canada	War Witch	Rebelle	French, Lingala	Kim Nguyen	Nominated
Chile	No		Spanish, English	Pablo Larraín	Nominated
China	Caught in the Web	搜索	Mandarin, Cantonese, English	Chen Kaige	Not nominated
Colombia	The Snitch Cartel	El cartel de los sapos	Spanish, English	Carlos Moreno	Not nominated
Croatia	Vegetarian Cannibal	Ljudožder vegetarijanac	Croatian	Branko Schmidt	Not nominated
Czech Republic	In the Shadow	Ve stínu	Czech, German, Polish	David Ondříček	Not nominated
Denmark	A Royal Affair	En kongelig affære	Danish, French, English, German	Nikolaj Arcel	Nominated
Dominican Republic	Jaque Mate		Spanish	José María Cabral	Not nominated
Estonia	Mushrooming	Seenelkäik	Estonian	Toomas Hussar	Not nominated
Finland	Purge	Puhdistus	Finnish	Antti Jokinen	Not nominated
France	The Intouchables	Intouchables	French, English	Éric Toledano and Olivier Nakache	Made shortlist
Georgia	Keep Smiling	გაიღიმეთ	Georgian, Russian	Rusudan Chkonia	Not nominated
Germany	Barbara		German	Christian Petzold	Not nominated
Greece	Unfair World	Άδικος Κόσμος	Greek	Filippos Tsitos	Not nominated
Greenland	Inuk		Greenlandic, Danish	Mike Magidson	Not nominated
Hong Kong	Life Without Principle	奪命金	Cantonese	Johnnie To	Not nominated
Hungary	Just the Wind	Csak a szél	Hungarian, English, Carpathian Romani	Benedek Fliegauf	Not nominated
Iceland	The Deep	Djúpið	Icelandic	Baltasar Kormákur	Made shortlist
India	Barfi!	बर्फी	Hindi	Anurag Basu	Not nominated
Indonesia	The Dancer	Sang Penari	Indonesian, Banyumasan	Ifa Isfansyah	Not nominated
Iran	A Cube of Sugar	یک حبه قند	Persian	Reza Mirkarimi	Withdrawn
Israel	Fill the Void	למלא את החלל	Hebrew	Rama Burshtein	Not nominated
Italy	Caesar Must Die	Cesare deve morire	Italian, Neapolitan, Sicilian, Barese Apulian, Central-Southern Calabrian, Romanesco	Paolo and Vittorio Taviani	Not nominated
Japan	Our Homeland	かぞくのくに	Japanese, Korean	Yang Yong-hi	Not nominated
Kazakhstan	Myn Bala: Warriors of the Steppe	Жаужүрек мың бала	Kazakh, Mongolian	Akan Satayev	Not nominated
Kenya	Nairobi Half Life		Swahili, English, Sheng, Kikuyu	Tosh Gitonga	Not nominated
Kyrgyzstan	The Empty Home	Пустой дом	Kyrgyz, Russian, French	Nurbek Egen	Not nominated
Latvia	Gulf Stream Under the Iceberg	Golfa straume zem ledus kalna / Гольфстрим под айсбергом	Russian	Jevgeņijs Paškevičs	Not nominated
Lithuania	Ramin	რამინი / Raminas	Georgian	Audrius Stonys	Not nominated
(North Macedonia) Macedonia	The Third Half	Трето полувреме	Macedonian, German, Bulgarian, Serbian, Judaeo-Spanish, English	Darko Mitrevski	Not nominated
Malaysia	Bunohan		Malay, Kelantan Malay	Dain Said	Not nominated
Mexico	After Lucia	Después de Lucía	Spanish	Michel Franco	Not nominated
Morocco	Death for Sale	موت للبيع	Arabic	Faouzi Bensaïdi	Not nominated
Netherlands	Kauwboy		Dutch	Boudewijn Koole	Not nominated
Norway	Kon-Tiki		Norwegian, English, Danish, German, French, Swedish, Spanish	Joachim Rønning and Espen Sandberg	Nominated
Palestine	When I Saw You	لما شفتك	Arabic, English	Annemarie Jacir	Not nominated
Peru	The Bad Intentions	Las malas intenciones	Spanish, Ayacucho Quechua	Rosario García-Montero	Not nominated
Philippines	Bwakaw		Filipino, English	Jun Lana	Not nominated
Poland	80 Million	80 milionów	Polish	Waldemar Krzystek	Not nominated
Portugal	Blood of My Blood	Sangue do Meu Sangue	Portuguese	João Canijo	Not nominated
Romania	Beyond the Hills	După dealuri	Romanian	Cristian Mungiu	Made shortlist
Russia	White Tiger	Белый тигр	Russian, German	Karen Shakhnazarov	Not nominated
Serbia	When Day Breaks	Кад сване дан	Serbian, German	Goran Paskaljević	Not nominated
Singapore	Already Famous	一泡而红	Mandarin, Singaporean Hokkien, Malay, English	Michelle Chong	Not nominated
Slovakia	Made in Ash	Až do mesta Aš	Slovak, German, Czech, Russian, Carpathian Romani	Iveta Grófová	Not nominated
Slovenia	A Trip	Izlet	Slovene	Nejc Gazvoda	Not nominated
South Africa	Little One		Zulu, English	Darrell Roodt	Not nominated
South Korea	Pietà	피에타	Korean	Kim Ki-duk	Not nominated
Spain	Blancanieves	Blancanieves / Blancaneu	No dialogue	Pablo Berger	Not nominated
Sweden	The Hypnotist	Hypnotisören	Swedish, Finnish	Lasse Hallström	Not nominated
Switzerland	Sister	L'enfant d'en haut	French, English	Ursula Meier	Made shortlist
Taiwan	Touch of the Light	逆光飛翔	Mandarin, Taiwanese Hokkien	Chang Jung-chi	Not nominated
Thailand	Headshot	ฝนตกขึ้นฟ้า	Thai	Pen-ek Ratanaruang	Not nominated
Turkey	Where the Fire Burns	Ateşin Düştüğü Yer	Turkish	İsmail Güneş	Not nominated
Ukraine	Firecrosser	Той, хто пройшов крізь вогонь	Ukrainian, Russian, English, Crimean Tatar, German, Mohawk	Mykhailo Illienko	Not nominated
Uruguay	The Delay	La demora	Spanish	Rodrigo Plá	Not nominated
Venezuela	Rock, Paper, Scissors	Piedra, papel o tijera	Spanish	Hernán Jabes	Not nominated
Vietnam	The Scent of Burning Grass	Mùi cỏ cháy	Vietnamese	Nguyễn Hữu Mười	Not nominated

== Notes ==
- Bolivia's nominating body, the Asociación de Cineastas Bolivianos, proposed submitting Insurgents by Jorge Sanjinés to represent Bolivia, and invited the film's producers to assemble the necessary documents to enter the film in the race. However, citing time restraints, the film's representatives declined to participate. Bolivia had been absent the past two years in large part because no local films fully met all AMPAS requirements.
- Cuba confirmed that it would not submit a film.
- Iran's Academy confirmed their participation in the competition on 21 September 2012, noting however that they had considered boycotting the Oscars due to the Innocence of Muslims video on YouTube that originated in the United States, and planned to send a strongly worded letter to that effect. On 24 September, it was announced that Iran's official selection committee had selected A Cube of Sugar by Reza Mirkarimi as the official Iranian submission. On the same day, the head of Iran's government controlled cinema agency called for a boycott of the Oscars and Reuters reported that Iran's Culture and Islamic Guidance Minister Mohammad Hosseini had confirmed that Iran would boycott.
- Luxembourg announced that their national selection committee had met and decided not to send a film. The country last competed in 2009.
