= Black Red Yellow =

2025 Kyrgyzstani drama film

- Promotional poster
- Kyrgyz: Кара Кызыл Сары
- Directed by: Aktan Abdykalykov
- Written by: Topchugul Shaidullayeva; Aktan Abdykalykov
- Starring: Nargiza Mamatkulova; Aigul Busurmankulova; Mirlan Abdykalykov
- Cinematography: Talant Akynbekov
- Edited by: Evgeny Krokhmalenko
- Music by: Balasagyn Musaev
- Production company: Kyrgyzfilm National Film Studio
- Release dates: 18 June 2025 (Shanghai); 31 August 2025 (Kyrgyzstan)
- Running time: 93 minutes
- Country: Kyrgyzstan
- Language: Kyrgyz

Black Red Yellow (Kyrgyz: Кара Кызыл Сары) is a 2025 Kyrgyz drama film co-written and directed by Aktan Abdykalykov. The film is based on short stories by writer Topchugul Shaidullaeva, focuses on a traditional carpet weaver and a horse herder, exploring themes of love, family, and destiny through the symbolism of carpet colors. It premiered at the Shanghai International Film Festival on 18 June 2025, where it won Golden Goblet.

It was selected as the Kyrgyz entry for the Best International Feature Film at the 98th Academy Awards, but it was not nominated.

== Cast ==
- Nargiza Mamatkulova
- Aigul Busurmankulova
- Mirlan Abdykalykov

== Production ==
The film produced by the Kyrgyzfilm National Film Studio was shot in Batken Region of Kyrgyzstan.

== Release ==
In August 2025, the film was screened at the SCO Outstanding Film Week programme in Qingdao, China.

The film was released in Bishkek, Kyrgyzstan on 31 August 2025 coinciding with the Independence Day holiday. Deputy Prime Minister Edil Baisalov attended the film screening.

== Accolades ==
Award	Date of ceremony	Category	Recipient	Result	Ref.
Shanghai International Film Festival	23 June 2025	Golden Goblet	Black Red Yellow	Won	
Asia Pacific Screen Awards	27 November 2025	Cultural Diversity Award	Black Red Yellow	Won	

== See also ==
- List of submissions to the 98th Academy Awards for Best International Feature Film
- List of Kyrgyzstani submissions for the Academy Award for Best International Feature Film
