= List of submissions to the 71st Academy Awards for Best Foreign Language Film =

1998 Best Foreign Language Film submissions
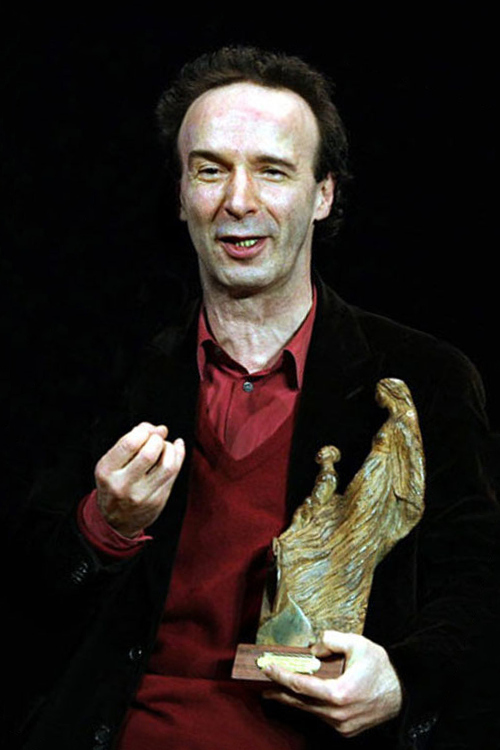
- Roberto Benigni directed Life Is Beautiful, which won the year's award.

Highlights
- Oscar winner: (Italy) Life Is Beautiful
- Submissions: 45
- Debuts: 1
- Total eligible: 44

This is a list of submissions to the 91st Academy Awards for the Best Foreign Language Film. The Academy of Motion Picture Arts and Sciences (AMPAS) has invited the film industries of various countries to submit their best film for the Academy Award for Best Foreign Language Film every year since the award was created in 1956. The award is presented annually by the Academy to a feature-length motion picture produced outside the United States that contains primarily non-English dialogue. The Foreign Language Film Award Committee oversees the process and reviews all the submitted films.

For the 71st Academy Awards, the submitted motion pictures must have first been released theatrically in their respective countries between 1 November 1997 and 31 October 1998. The deadline for submissions to the Academy was 2 November 1998. 45 countries submitted films, and 44 were found to be eligible by AMPAS and screened for voters. Kyrgyzstan submitted a film for the first time, while Lebanon and Morocco made submissions for the first time since 1978 and 1977, respectively. The five nominees were announced on 9 February 1999.

Italy won the award for the thirteenth time, expanding its own record as the most winning country, with Life Is Beautiful by Roberto Benigni, which also won Best Actor (Roberto Benigni) and Best Original Dramatic Score, and was also nominated for Best Picture, Best Director, Best Original Screenplay and Best Film Editing.

== Submissions ==
Submitting country	Film title used in nomination	Original title	Language(s)	Director(s)	Result
Argentina	Tango	Tango, no me dejes nunca	Spanish	Carlos Saura	Nominated
Austria	The Inheritors	Die Siebtelbauern	Mühlviertlerisch	Stefan Ruzowitzky	Not nominated
Belgium	Rosie		Flemish	Patrice Toye	Not nominated
Brazil	Central Station	Central do Brasil	Brazilian Portuguese	Walter Salles	Nominated
Canada	August 32nd on Earth	Un 32 août sur terre	French, English	Denis Villeneuve	Not nominated
China	Genghis Khan	一代天骄成吉思汗	Mandarin, Mongolian	Sai Fu and Lisi Mai	Not nominated
Colombia	The Rose Seller	La vendedora de rosas	Spanish	Víctor Gaviria	Not nominated
Croatia	Transatlantic	Transatlantik	Croatian	Mladen Juran	Not nominated
Czech Republic	Sekal Has to Die	Je třeba zabít Sekala / Zabić Sekala	Czech	Vladimír Michálek	Not nominated
Denmark	The Celebration	Festen	Danish, German, English	Thomas Vinterberg	Not nominated
Finland	A Summer by the River	Kuningasjätkä	Finnish	Markku Pölönen	Not nominated
France	The Dreamlife of Angels	La vie rêvée des anges	French	Erick Zonca	Not nominated
Germany	Run Lola Run	Lola rennt	German	Tom Tykwer	Not nominated
Greece	Eternity and a Day	Μια Αιωνιότητα και Μια Μέρα	Greek, Italian, English	Theo Angelopoulos	Not nominated
Hong Kong	Made in Hong Kong	香港製造	Cantonese	Fruit Chan	Not nominated
Hungary	Gypsy Lore	Romani kris / Cigánytörvény	Lovari Romani, Hungarian, German	Bence Gyöngyössy	Not nominated
Iceland	Count Me Out	Stikkfrí	Icelandic	Ari Kristinsson	Not nominated
India	Jeans	ஜீன்ஸ்	Tamil	S. Shankar	Not nominated
Indonesia	Leaf on a Pillow	Daun di Atas Bantal	Indonesian, Javanese, Minangkabau, Acehnese	Garin Nugroho	Not nominated
Iran	Children of Heaven	بچه هاي آسمان	Persian	Majid Majidi	Nominated
Israel	Circus Palestine	קרקס פלשתינה	Hebrew, Arabic, Russian, English	Eyal Halfon	Not nominated
Italy	Life Is Beautiful	La vita è bella	Italian, Tuscan, German	Roberto Benigni	Won Academy Award
Japan	Begging for Love	愛を乞う人	Japanese, Taiwanese Hokkien	Hideyuki Hirayama	Not nominated
Kyrgyzstan	The Adopted Son	Бешкемпир	Kyrgyz	Aktan Arym Kubat	Not nominated
Lebanon	West Beirut	بيروت الغربية / West Beyrouth	Arabic, French	Ziad Doueiri	Not nominated
Luxembourg	Back in Trouble		Luxembourgish, German, French	Andy Bausch	Not nominated
(North Macedonia) Macedonia	Goodbye, 20th Century!	Збогум на дваесеттиот век!	Macedonian	Darko Mitrevski and Aleksandar Popovski	Not nominated
Mexico	Under a Spell	Un embrujo	Spanish	Carlos Carrera	Not nominated
Morocco	Mektoub	مكتوب	Arabic	Nabil Ayouch	Not nominated
Netherlands	The Polish Bride	De Poolse bruid	Dutch, Polish	Karim Traidia	Not nominated
Norway	Only Clouds Move the Stars	Bare skyer beveger stjernene	Norwegian	Torun Lian	Not nominated
Philippines	In the Navel of the Sea	Sa Pusod ng Dagat	Filipino	Marilou Diaz-Abaya	Not nominated
Portugal	Anxiety	Inquietude	Portuguese	Manoel de Oliveira	Not nominated
Puerto Rico	Heroes from Another Country	Heroes de otra patria	Spanish, English	Iván Dariel Ortiz	Not nominated
Romania	Next Stop Paradise	Terminus paradis	Romanian	Lucian Pintilie	Not nominated
Russia	The Barber of Siberia	Сибирский цирюльник	Russian, English, French, German	Nikita Mikhalkov	Disqualified
Slovakia	Rivers of Babylon		Slovak	Vladimír Balco	Not nominated
Spain	The Grandfather	El abuelo	Spanish	José Luis Garci	Nominated
Sweden	Show Me Love	Fucking Åmål	Swedish	Lukas Moodysson	Not nominated
Switzerland	War in the Highlands	La guerre dans le Haut Pays	French	Francis Reusser	Not nominated
Taiwan	Flowers of Shanghai	海上花	Shanghainese, Cantonese	Hou Hsiao-hsien	Not nominated
Thailand	Who Is Running?	ท้าฟ้าลิขิต	Thai	Oxide Pang Chun	Not nominated
United Kingdom	Chameleon	Cameleon	Welsh	Ceri Sherlock	Not nominated
Venezuela	Loop	Rizo	Spanish	Julio Sosa Pietri	Not nominated
FR Yugoslavia	The Powder Keg	Буре барута	Serbian, Croatian	Goran Paskaljević	Not nominated

== Notes ==
- Russia submitted The Barber of Siberia by Nikita Mikhalkov, but it was disqualified when the print did not arrive in Los Angeles on time for screening.
- Venezuela submitted Loop by Julio Sosa Pietri. It was selected by a four-member jury after the cinematography union boycotted the panel. The choice was criticized because jury chairman Lorenzo González Izquierdo owned the theater that gave the film its only screening. CNAC president Abdel Güerere asked AMPAS to let CNAC choose the jury, but González Izquierdo opposed this, saying it would invite corruption.
