= Elnura Osmonalieva =

- Born: 12 January 1981 (age 45); Osh, Kyrgyz SSR, USSR
- Education: American University of Central Asia, Tisch School of the Arts at New York University
- Occupation: Film director

Osmonalieva, Elnura (born January 12, 1981, in Osh, Kyrgyzstan) is a Kyrgyzstani film director.

She attended a Soviet school and later studied in the US just a few years following the disintegration of the Soviet Union. She is an advocate for art and education. Her works explore human experiences in the circumstances of poverty and strong societal pressures.

Currently she is based in New York where she is a graduate film student at the Tisch School of the Arts at New York University.

She is a mother of three and made her recent short "Seide" while having her new baby.

== Filmography ==
- Farewell, short, Best Central Asian Auteur Film in 2009
- Almaz, documentary, Best Feature Length Documentary, Stars of Shaken, 2010
- Kyrgyzland, documentary, The Kyrgyz National Film Award of 2013
- Seide, short, official selections: Venice Films Festivals (2015), Sundance (2016), Int'l Santa Barbara Film Festival (2016), Clermont Ferrand Int'l Short Film Festival (2016), Manchester Film Festival (2016)
