= Izya Gershtein =

Kyrgyzstani film director (1923–2013)

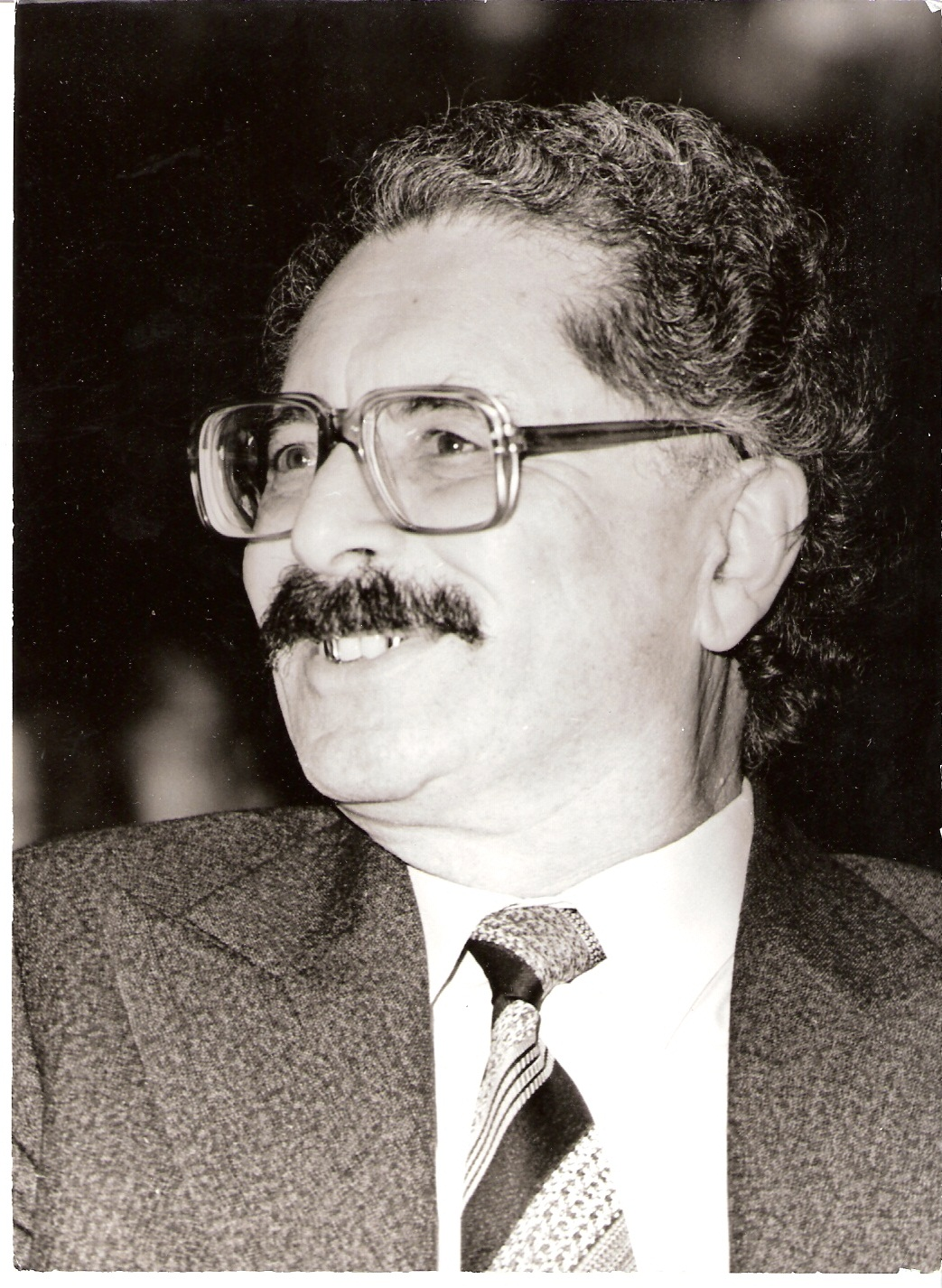
- Born: 22 June 1923; Kiev, USSR
- Died: 13 February 2013 (aged 89); Haifa, Israel
- Occupations: Film director Screenwriter; Cameraman
- Awards: Lenin Komsomol Prize

Izya Abramovich Gershtein (Russian Изя Абрамович Герштейн; born on 22 June 1923 in Kiev, USSR – 13 February 2013 in Haifa, Israel) was a notable Kyrgyz Soviet documentary filmmaker, cameraman and director. People's Artist of Kyrgyz SSR, Honoured Culture Worker of Kyrgyz SSR (1974), Lenin Komsomol Prize Laureate.

== Biography ==
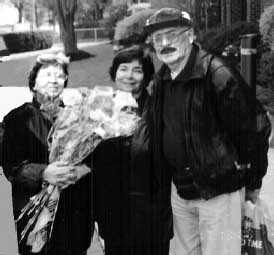
Natalia Mikhoels, Eugenia Gitis and Izya Gershtein, Baltimore, USA, 2000.

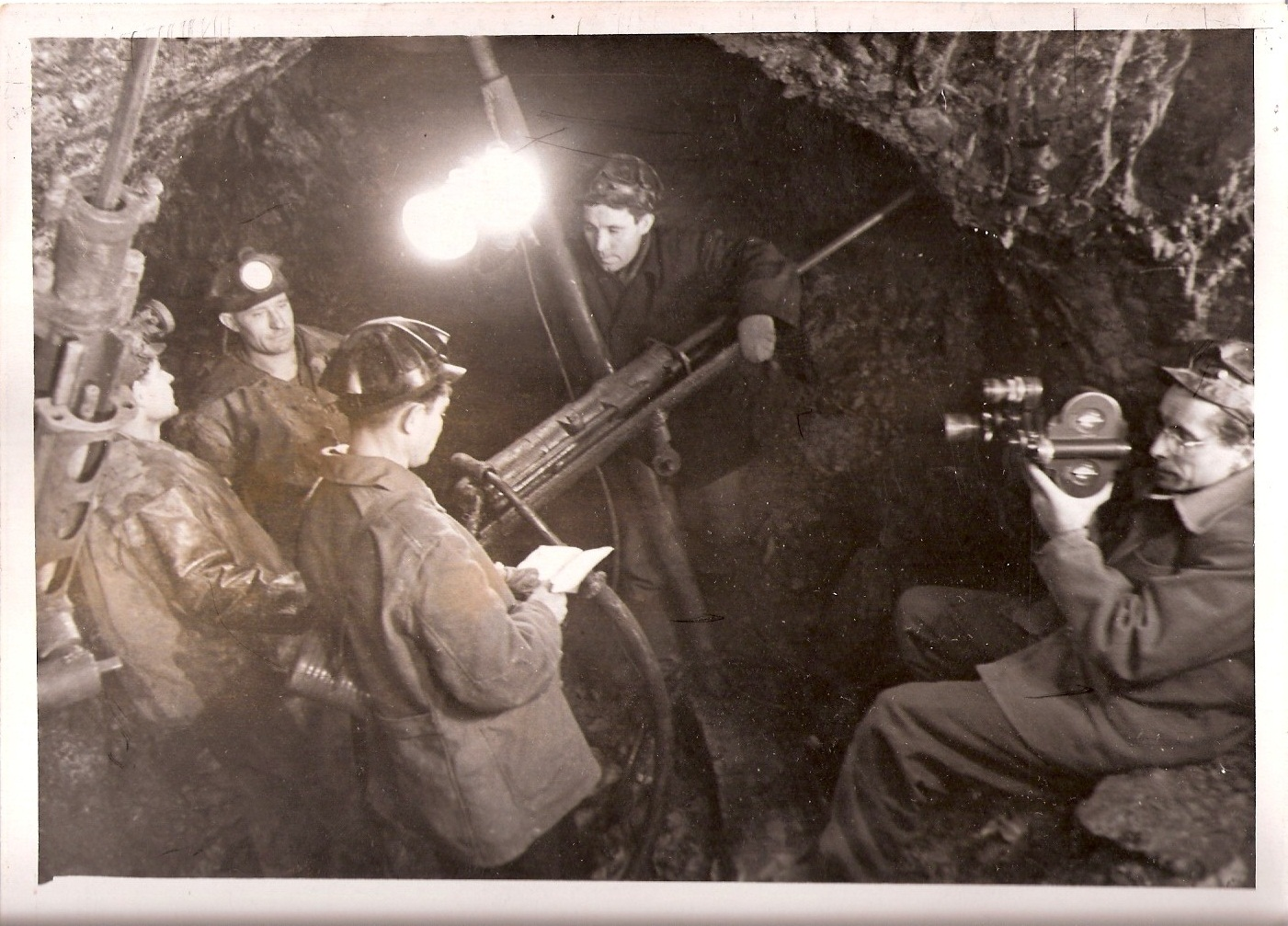
Working away

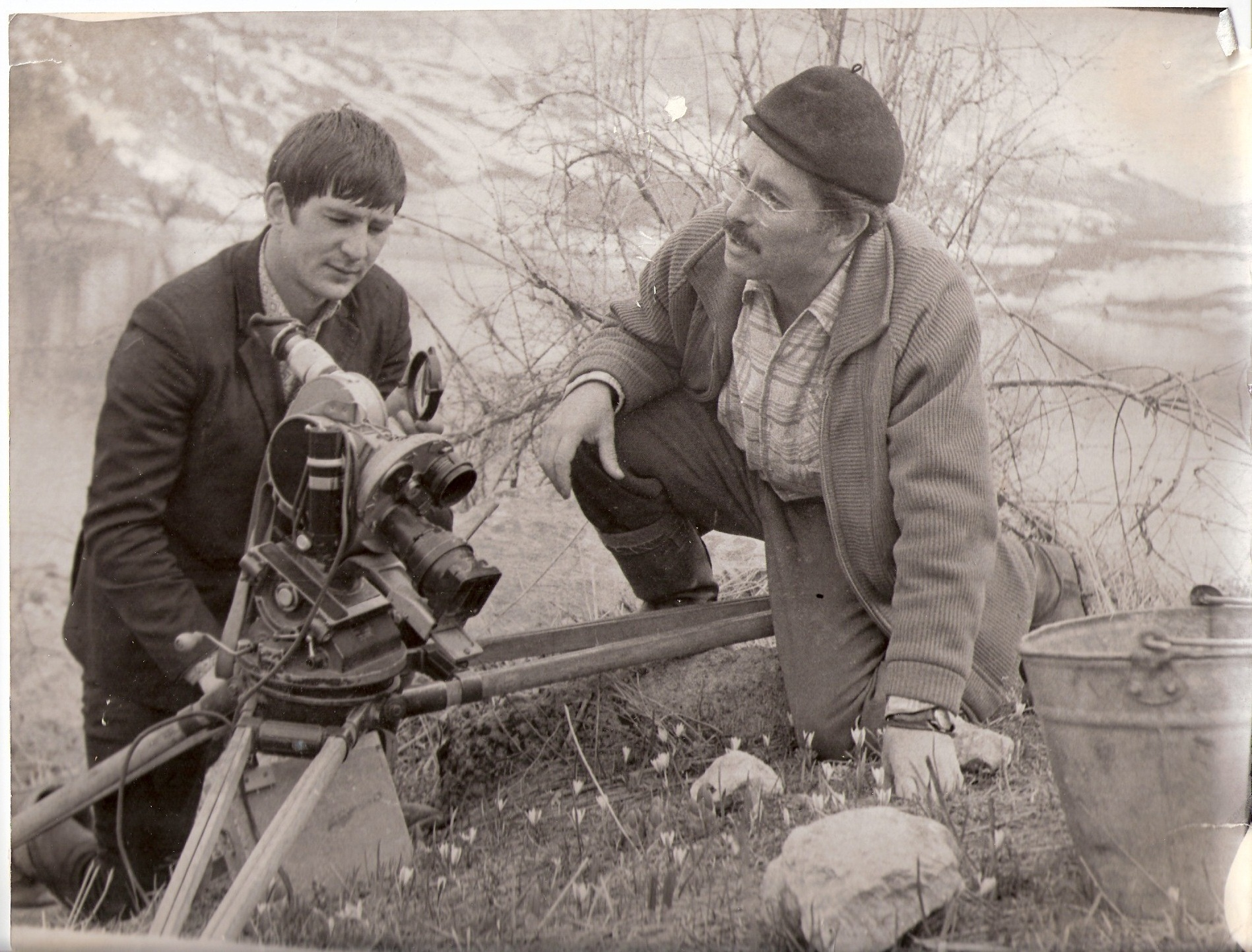
In the mountains

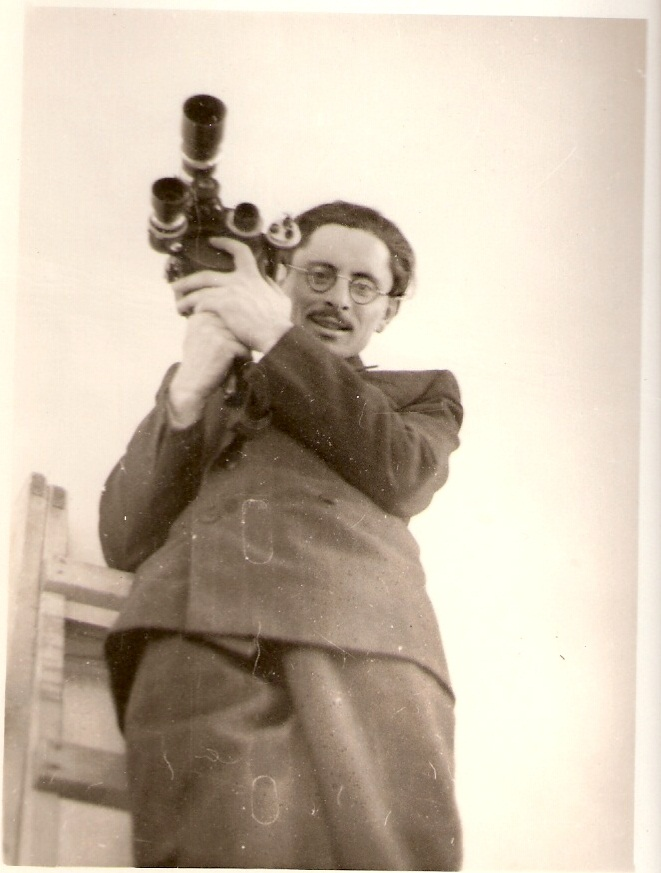
Before a shoot

In 1941 and 1942 he worked as a technician at the Aktyubinsk power plant. In 1942 became an assistant cameraman at the Frunze "Sibtechfilm" news and documentary film studio.

Later in 1942 he started working at the Kyrgyzfilm studio, eventually becoming a director. Directed (and often wrote the screenplays) the following documentary films (a short list) "Right flank man" (Russian «Правофланговый») (1960), "Three answers for the mountains" (Russian «Три ответа горам») (1963), "Shift" (Russian «Смена») (1964), "Boomerang" (Russian «Бумеранг») (1965), "There, past the mountains, lies the horizon" (Russian «Там, за горами, горизонт») (1966), "Cape of the bay runner" (Russian «Мыс гнедого скакуна») (1966), "Chingiz Aitmatov" (Russian «Чингиз Айтматов») (1968), "Pamir – the roof of the world" (Russian «Памир – крыша мира») (1969), "A happy man" (Russian «Счастливый человек») (1972), "Why the reward?" (Russian «За что премия?») (1973), "Sheepherders" (Russian «Чабаны») (1977), "Farewell, windmill" (Russian «Прощай, мельница») (1978), "Four portraits" (Russian «Четыре портрета») (1979), "For sale to demolish" (Russian «Продаётся на слом») (1982; Winner of the Oberhausen International Short Film Festival prize, 1983) and others.

His work is characterized by a sharp journalistic vision and an expressive editing style.

Emigrated to Israel in the second half of the 1990s.

Gershtein died on 13 February 2013, in Haifa, Israel.

== Filmography ==
Most notable works

=== (1960–1983) ===
No.	Info about the film
01	"Right flank man" (Russian "Правофланговый"), documentary film (1960)
02	"Semion Chuikov, the artist" (Russian "Художник Семен Чуйков"), a documentary essay (1962)
03	"Three answers for the mountains" (Russian «Три ответа горам»), documentary film (1963) 3 parts, color: 2nd degree diploma for the best documentary essay, at the Ashgabat Film Festival (1963).; Best camera work diploma, at the Central Asia and Kazakhstan Film Festival in Dushanbe(1963) .; Soviet wide Film Festival diploma, Leningrad (1964).
04	"Shift" (Russian «Смена»), documentary film (1964) b/w, wide screen, Soviet wide screening: 1st degree diploma for the best documentary essay, at the IV Central Asia Republics and Kazakhstan Film Festival in Almaty (1965)
05	"Boomerang" (Russian «Бумеранг»), documentary film (1965) 2 parts, color, popular science, Soviet wide screening: Special diploma for "a sharp journalistic review of an important problem" at the VI Competition Review for Central Asian republics and Kazakhstan filmmakers, in Ashgabat (1966)
06	"There, past the mountains, lies the horizon" (Russian «Там, за горами, горизонт»), documentary film (1966) 5 parts, b/w, Soviet wide screening: A special diploma for the documentary filmmaker I. Gershtein, for persistent journalistic work, at the V Competition Review for Central Asian republics and Kazakhstan filmmakers, in Dushanbe (1967).
07	"Cape of the bay runner" (Russian «Мыс гнедого скакуна»), documentary film (1966) 2 parts, b/w, Soviet wide screening: 2nd degree diploma at the VI Competition Review for Central Asian republics and Kazakhstan filmmakers, in Dushanbe (1967).
08	"Chingiz Aitmatov" (Russian «Чингиз Айтматов»), documentary film about the People's Writer of Kyrgyzstan Chingiz Aitmatov (1968) 2 parts, b/w, popular science, Soviet wide screening: A diploma at the VIII Competition Review for Central Asian republics and Kazakhstan filmmakers, for "the best popular science film and the best screenplay", in Almaty (1969)
09	"Pamir – the roof of the world" (Russian «Памир – крыша мира») (1969), documentary film, 3 parts, color, Soviet wide screening: A prize and a diploma for the best Camera work, at the VIII Competition Review for Central Asian republics and Kazakhstan filmmakers in Almaty (1969); "Silver Dolphin" prize, at the International Competition for Films on Geography, in Teheran, Iran (1970); Best camera work diploma; Best sound and musical score diploma, Best documentary film about mountain climbers award, at an international film festival in Switzerland (1970)
10	"A happy man" (Russian «Счастливый человек») (1972), documentary film
11	"Why the reward?" (Russian «За что премия?») (1973), documentary film
12	"Sheepherders" (Russian «Чабаны») (1977), documentary film
13	"Farewell, windmill" (Russian «Прощай, мельница») (1978), documentary film, 2 parts, color: Received a number of prizes, at various international film festivals
14	"Four portraits" (Russian «Четыре портрета») (1979), documentary film
15	"For sale to demolish" (Russian «Продаётся на слом») (1982) 2 parts, color, Soviet wide screening: Winner of the Oberhausen International Short Film Festival prize, (1983)

=== (2000) ===
No.	Info about the film
01	"While I remember, I'm alive (Russian "Пока я помню, я живу..."), documentary film (2000). Gershtein's last film, in which the daughters of Solomon Mikhoels, Natalia and Nina, talk about their father's fate.

== Encyclopedic mentions ==
- Cinema: An encyclopedia glossary (Russian Кино: Энциклопедический словарь)/S.I. Yutkevich; Y.S. Afansiev, V.E. Baskakov, I.V. Weisfeld, Small Soviet Encyclopedia, 1987.- 640 pages., 96 photographs.
- Soviet filmmaker association guide, 1981 edition.
