= Sherlock in Russia =

- Genre: Crime drama
- Created by: Nurbek Egen; Based on the works of; Sir Arthur Conan Doyle
- Written by: Oleg Malovichenko
- Directed by: Nurbek Egen
- Starring: Maksim Matveyev; Vladimir Mishukov; Irina Starshenbaum
- Country of origin: Russia
- Original language: Russian (with some scenes spoken in English)
- No. of series: 1
- No. of episodes: 8

Production
- Executive producers: Aleksandr Tsekalo; Aleksander Remizov
- Producer: Aleksandr Tsekalo
- Cinematography: Nikolai Bogachyov
- Editor: Anna Kozlova
- Camera setup: Dolby Digital
- Production company: Sreda

Original release
- Network: Start.ru
- Release: October 22, 2020

Sherlock in Russia (Russian: Ше́рлок в России, romanized: Sherlok v Rossii, also known as Sherlock: The Russian Chronicles) is a Russian detective TV series based on Arthur Conan Doyle's stories about the legendary detective Sherlock Holmes. This is the third Russian adaptation of the character and the first with original script. The series was released in October 2020 on the Start.ru streaming service.

== Synopsis ==
Jack the Ripper leaves behind a trail of victims and escapes from London to Saint-Petersburg. Sherlock Holmes leaves a badly injured Doctor Watson in Britain and goes after the deadly killer to Saint Petersburg.

In Russia, he meets Doctor Kartsev, from whom he rents a living room. Dr. Kartsev starts helping him solve very strange, confusing, and complicated crimes, and Holmes is once again forced to convince law enforcement authorities of the correctness of his deductive methods of investigation.

== Cast ==
- Maksim Matveyev as Sherlock Holmes
- Vladimir Mishukov as Dr. Ilya Kartsev
- Irina Starshenbaum as Sofya Kasatkina
- Pavel Maykov as Lavr Trudniy, collegiate assessor, head of the St. Petersburg detective police
- Konstantin Bogomolov as Pyotr Znamenskiy, Major General, Chief of Police of St. Petersburg
- Konstantin Yushkevich as Dr. Bakhmetyev
- Yevgeny Dyatlov as Kobylin
- Kirill Gordleev as Koshko
- Yevgeny Sannikov as Ilya Moiseev
- Eugenia Mandzhieva as Aigul Valikhanova, curator-archivist of the Museum of the Saint Petersburg Mining University
- Oksana Bazilevich as Madam Manuilova
- Fyodor Fedotov as Anton Sviridov
- Yevgeny Romantsov as Kat
- Fyodor Pisarenko as Venya Kasatkin, Sophia's deaf and dumb little son
- Valery Kukhareshin as Albert Dreitsen
- Boris Khasanov as Emperor Alexander III of Russia
- Dmitry Lomakin as Grand Duke George Alexandrovich of Russia
- Andrey Feskov as Dr. John Watson
- Aleksey Vdovin as Inspector Lestrade
- Nikita Kologrivyy as Ivan, "the Limper"

== Production ==
Filming began in St. Petersburg in spring 2019. The director was Nurbek Egen. He has already shot such series and films as “Alibi”, “Secret Sign” and other detective dramas on Russian television. Oleg Malovichenko worked on the script, his previous works were “Ice”, “Method”, “Attraction” and others. The series is not a full-fledged adaptation of Arthur Conan Doyle's works; it is based on an original script.

Producer Aleksander Remizov claimed: “The plot is based on exciting and mysterious crimes that Sherlock would never have encountered in his native England. We will show the viewer a story familiar to everyone, but on the other side. The unification of cultures through the adaptation of the Englishman in Russia, new crimes and love are the components of the project that create a new story - 'Sherlock in Russia'”.

== See also ==
- Sherlock Holmes vs. Jack the Ripper
- Sherlock Holmes (2013 TV series)
