= Versus (2016 film) =

- Directed by: Nurbek Egen
- Screenplay by: Oleg Malovichko
- Produced by: Alexandra But; Avdey Kiryanov; Natalia Lazareva; Yuriy Sapronov; Evgeniya Tsitsina
- Starring: Aleksey Chadov; Oksana Akinshina; Anton Shagin; Sergey Chirkov; Melvin Manhoef
- Cinematography: Sergey Machilskiy; Maksim Osadchiy-Korytkovskiy
- Edited by: Sean Albertson; Alexei Volnov
- Music by: Paul Mills
- Production company: Russian Golden Episodes
- Release date: November 3, 2016 (Russia)
- Country: Russia
- Language: Russian
- Budget: $5.8 million

Versus (Russian: Молот, romanized: Molot) is a 2016 Russian sports-drama film directed by Nurbek Egen. It was released on November 3, 2016 (in Russia).

== Plot ==
When MMA fighter Victor gets into a car accident, the bandit Shark threatens to kill his beloved girl if he does not agree to throw a fight in the ring.

== Filming ==
The movie was filmed partly in Saint Petersburg. For filming Birzhevoy Bridge was blocked, which connects the Vasilyevsky Island with the Petrograd side.

== Cast ==
- Aleksey Chadov as Victor Stroev aka Russian Hammer
- Oksana Akinshina as Vera
- Anton Shagin as Shark
- Sergey Chirkov as Alik
- Melvin Manhoef as Manuel Rivera aka Typhoon

== Marketing ==
Movie trailer was released online September 7, 2016.

== Facts ==
- All the scenes of fights with Aleksey Chadov were filmed without stunt doubles.
