= Loop (1998 film) =

1999 film

- Promotional release poster
- Directed by: Julio Sosa Pietri
- Written by: Julio Sosa Pietri
- Starring: Jean Carlo Simancas
- Release dates: 15 November 1998 (Mar del Plata); 10 December 1998 (Venezuela); 23 April 1999 (Colombia)
- Running time: 110 minutes
- Countries: Venezuela; Colombia; Mexico
- Language: Spanish

Loop (Spanish: Rizo) is a 1998 drama film written and directed by Julio Sosa Pietri. The film was selected as the Venezuelan entry for the Best Foreign Language Film at the 71st Academy Awards, but was not accepted as a nominee.

== Cast ==
- Jean Carlo Simancas as Alejandro del Rey
- Arcelia Ramírez as Lucía / Sandra
- Luly Bossa as Shara Goldberg
- Claudio Obregón as Julio Andrés Martínez
- Julio Medina as Ataúlfo
- Fausto Cabrera as Alfonso del Rey
- Roberto Colmenares as Francisco Leoz
- Amanda Gutiérrez as Mimí Cordero

== See also ==
- List of submissions to the 71st Academy Awards for Best Foreign Language Film
- List of Venezuelan submissions for the Academy Award for Best Foreign Language Film
