= Centaur (2017 film) =

2017 film

- Film poster
- Directed by: Aktan Abdykalykov
- Written by: Aktan Abdykalykov
- Starring: Aktan Abdykalykov
- Release date: 17 February 2017 (Germany)
- Running time: 99 minutes
- Country: Kyrgyzstan
- Language: Kyrgyz

Centaur is a 2017 Kyrgyzstani drama film directed by Aktan Abdykalykov. It was screened in the Panorama section at the 67th Berlin International Film Festival and won the CICAE award. It was selected as the Kyrgyzstani entry for the Best Foreign Language Film at the 90th Academy Awards, but it was not nominated.

== Plot ==
Outside Bishkek, a cinema projectionist named Centaur steals racehorses at night and sets them free.

== Cast ==
- Aktan Abdykalykov as Centaur
- Nuraly Tursunkojoev as Nurberdi
- Zarema Asanalieva as Maripa
- Taalaikan Abazova as Sharapat
- Ilim Kalmuratov as Sadyr
- Bolot Tentimyshov as Karabay
- Maksat Mamyrkanov as Teit

== See also ==
- List of submissions to the 90th Academy Awards for Best Foreign Language Film
- List of Kyrgyzstani submissions for the Academy Award for Best International Feature Film
