= Heaven Is Beneath Mother's Feet =

- Theatrical release poster
- Directed by: Ruslan Akun
- Written by: Ruslan Akun; Emil Esenaliev
- Produced by: Tugolbay Koychiev; Aziza Khalbekova
- Starring: Emil Esenaliev
- Cinematography: Kalmatov Kanybek
- Release date: March 1, 2024
- Running time: 140 minutes
- Country: Kyrgyzstan
- Language: Kyrgyz

Heaven Is Beneath Mother's Feet (Kyrgyz: Бейиш - эненин таманында) is a 2024 Kyrgyzstani drama film directed by Ruslan Akun and written by Akun and Emil Esenaliev. Starring Esenaliev accompanied by Anarkul Nazarkulova and Bolot Tentimyshov. It is about a man with an intellectual disability who will take his mother to Mecca so she can go to paradise.

It was selected as the Kyrgyzstani entry for the Best International Feature Film at the 97th Academy Awards, but was not nominated.

== Synopsis ==
Adil is a 35-year-old man with intellectual disability who lives with his 75-year-old mother, Raikhan, in a small town. She always tells Adil that he will go straight to heaven, but he does not want to go without his mother's presence. One day, an 8-year-old boy tells him that if he takes his mother to the Holy city of Mecca for the Hajj, then she will go to heaven. As a result, Adil undertakes a journey on foot to the place while carrying his mother in a wheelbarrow.

== Cast ==
- Emil Esenaliev as Adil
- Anarkul Nazarkulova as Raikhan
- Bolot Tentimyshov

== Production ==
Principal photography took place in Kyrgyzstan, Uzbekistan, Kazakhstan, Azerbaijan, Turkey, Egypt and Saudi Arabia.

== Release ==
It premiered on March 1, 2024, in Kyrgystani theaters, then was released on March 21, 2024, in Kazakh theaters, and on April 11, 2024, in Russian and Uzbek theaters.

== Reception ==
=== Box-office ===
The film established itself as one of the highest-grossing films of 2024 in the Kyrgyzstan and Kazakhstan market. After 4 days of its release in Kazakhstan, it grossed ₸454 million tenge (just over $1 million), surpassing Dune: Part Two, Kung Fu Panda 4 and Ghostbusters: Frozen Empire in grosses.

=== Accolades ===
Year	Award / Festival	Category	Recipient	Result	Ref.
2024	3rd International Film Festival in Good Direction - Russia	Grand Prize	Ruslan Akun	Won	

== See also ==
- List of submissions to the 97th Academy Awards for Best International Feature Film
- List of Kyrgyzstani submissions for the Academy Award for Best International Feature Film
