= Running to the Sky =

2019 film

- Directed by: Mirlan Abdykalykov
- Starring: Temirlan Asankadyrov
- Release dates: 8 October 2019 (Busan); 17 October 2019
- Running time: 88 minutes
- Country: Kyrgyzstan
- Language: Kyrgyz

Running to the Sky is a 2019 Kyrgyzstani drama film directed by Mirlan Abdykalykov. It was selected as the Kyrgyzstani entry for the Best International Feature Film at the 93rd Academy Awards, but it was not nominated.

== Synopsis ==
A schoolboy gets a chance of bigger opportunities after displaying a talent for running.

== Cast ==
- Temirlan Asankadyrov as Jekshen
- Ruslan Orozakunov as Saparbek
- Meerim Atantaeva as Gym teacher
- Ilim Kalmuratov as Math teacher

== See also ==
- List of submissions to the 93rd Academy Awards for Best International Feature Film
- List of Kyrgyzstani submissions for the Academy Award for Best International Feature Film
