= Ruslan Akun =

Kyrgyz director (born 1984)

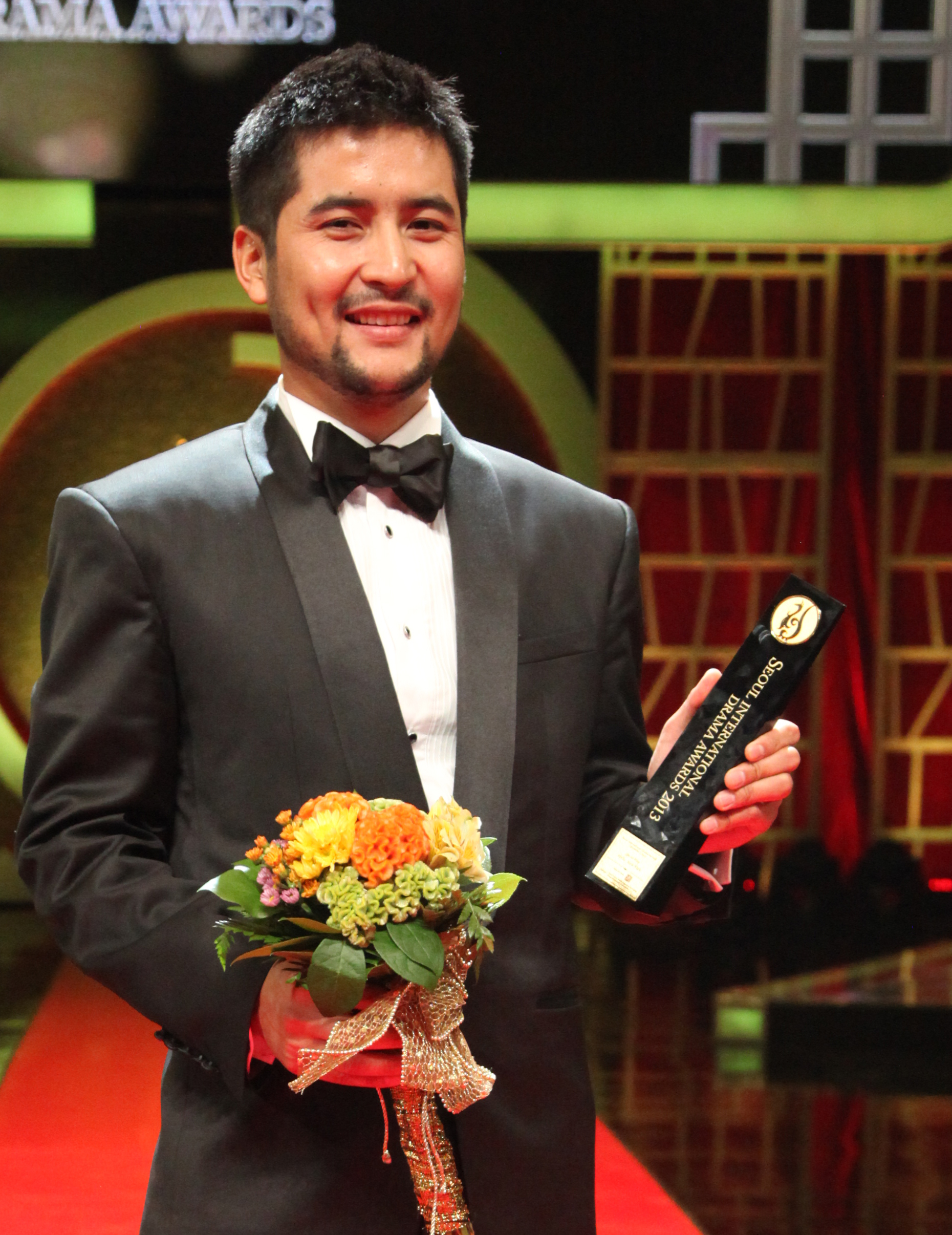
- Ruslan Akun at Seoul International Drama Awards
- Born: November 30, 1984 (age 40); Bishkek, Kyrgyzstan
- Occupation(s): Director, screenwriter, producer

Ruslan Akun (Kyrgyz: Руслан Акун; born November 30, 1984) is a Kyrgyz director, producer and screenwriter who has worked on films and TV shows. He is best known for Salam, New York (2013), Herding (2014) and Kök Börü: Game of the Tough (2018).

== Early life ==
Akun grew up in the small town of Naryn bordering China. As a student and TV producer, he covered two revolutions, ethnic clash, and witnessed turbulent changes happening in his newly independent country of Kyrgyzstan.

== Career ==
After graduating from American University - Central Asia, Akun's advocacy for positive social changes in his country made him direct and produce educational films. He was commissioned by Swiss Red Cross to write and direct health-related educational films for school children and young people in Kyrgyz countryside. Follow-up effectiveness evaluations showed that, for instance, a fictionalized educational film on dental health were successful with number of children brushing their teeth twice a day growing from 37% to 71%. In addition, Akun created and produced several prime-time political TV shows on Kyrgyz National Public TV.

In 2011, Akun and his friends wrote a script and filmed non-actors. The movie came out about 110 minutes long and was about Bishkek. Friends also negotiated the theatre release of his film Bishkek, I love you!].

His second independent film Salam, New York became the biggest box office hit in a history of Kyrgyz Republic. The film won Best Film, Best Director, Best Original Screenplay, Best Music, Best Editing awards at the Kyrgyz National Cinema Awards. During the theatre release, pirates leaked the film but were stopped by Akun's company and Intellectual Property Agency Kyrgyz Patent. It was the first time piracy was persecuted in Kyrgyzstan's history.

Akun's short film Herding was selected to more than 50 film festivals international competition section worldwide including Clermont-Ferrand, San Paolo, and Brussels.

Since 2014, Akun pursuing his master's degree at School of Cinematic Arts, University of Southern California; he holds a bachelor's degree from Mass Communications, American University - Central Asia.

== Filmography ==
- No Regrets (Не тужить), 2009
- Thank You! (Рахмат), 2010
- Bishkek, I Love You (Бишкек, я тебя люблю), 2011
- Salam, New York (Салам, Нью-Йорк), 2013
- Herding, 2014
- My Girlfriend's Hero (Герой моей девушки), 2015
- Director's Cut, 2015
- Kök Börü: Game of the Tough (Время стойких), 2018
- Heaven Is Beneath Mother's Feet (Бейиш - эненин таманында), 2024
- Am I Really Going to Die Being Such a Beauty? (Я такая красивая, неужели я умру?)
