= The Chimp (2001 film) =

2001 film by Aktan Abdykalykov

- Directed by: Aktan Abdykalykov
- Written by: Aktan Abdykalykov; Avtandil Adikulov; Artandie Adykyeov; Tonino Guerra
- Produced by: Marc Baschet
- Starring: Mirlan Abdykalykov
- Cinematography: Khasan Kydyraliyev
- Release date: May 2001
- Running time: 92 minutes
- Countries: Kyrgyzstan; Russia; France; Japan
- Languages: Kyrgyz, Russian

The Chimp (Kyrgyz: Maimil, Маймыл) is a 2001 Kyrgyzstani film directed by Aktan Abdykalykov. It was Kyrgyzstan's submission to the 74th Academy Awards for the Academy Award for Best Foreign Language Film, but was not accepted as a nominee. It was also screened in the Un Certain Regard section at the 2001 Cannes Film Festival.

== Cast ==
- Mirlan Abdykalykov - The Chimp
- Dzylykcy Dzakypov - The father
- Sergej Golovkin - Sacha
- Alexandra Mitrokhina - Zina
- Yuri Sokolov - Iouri
- Salynbek Sarymsakov - Akbar
- Alexei Manzinbine - Friend of the father
- Tchynarkoul Moukacheva - Woman with the skin stain
- Jyldyz Abakirova - Jyldyz
- Veronika Semibratova - Vicki
- Renata Tanabaeva - Renata
- Nelli Soultangazieva - Nelli
- Saida Mamyrbaeva - Saida
- Nikolai Bouriak - Head worker
- Ainagoul Essenkojeva - The Mother

== See also ==
- List of submissions to the 74th Academy Awards for Best Foreign Language Film
