= The Empty Home =

2012 film

- Directed by: Nurbek Egen
- Written by: Ekaterina Tirdatova
- Starring: Maral Koichukaraeva
- Cinematography: Dmitry Ermakov
- Release date: 7 June 2012 (Seattle)
- Running time: 98 minutes
- Countries: Kyrgyzstan; Russia; France
- Languages: Kyrgyz; Russian; French

The Empty Home is a 2012 Kyrgyzstani-Russian drama film directed by Nurbek Egen. The film was selected as the Kyrgyzstani entry for the Best Foreign Language Oscar at the 85th Academy Awards, but it did not make the final shortlist.

== Cast ==
- Maral Koichukaraeva as Ascel
- Cecile Plage as Virginie
- Atai Omurbekov as Marat
- Asan Amanov as Tynchtyk
- Bolot Tentimyshov as Sultan
- Denis Sukhanov as Arkady
- Kseniya Lavrova-Glinka as Masha
- Françoise Michaud as Virginie's mother
- Maxim Glotov as Igor
- Roman Nesterenko as Victor
- Michele Levieux as Midwife

== See also ==
- List of submissions to the 85th Academy Awards for Best Foreign Language Film
- List of Kyrgyzstani submissions for the Academy Award for Best International Feature Film
