= Janysh Kulmambetov =

Kyrgyz playwright and screenwriter

Janysh Kulmambetov Жаныш Кулмамбетов
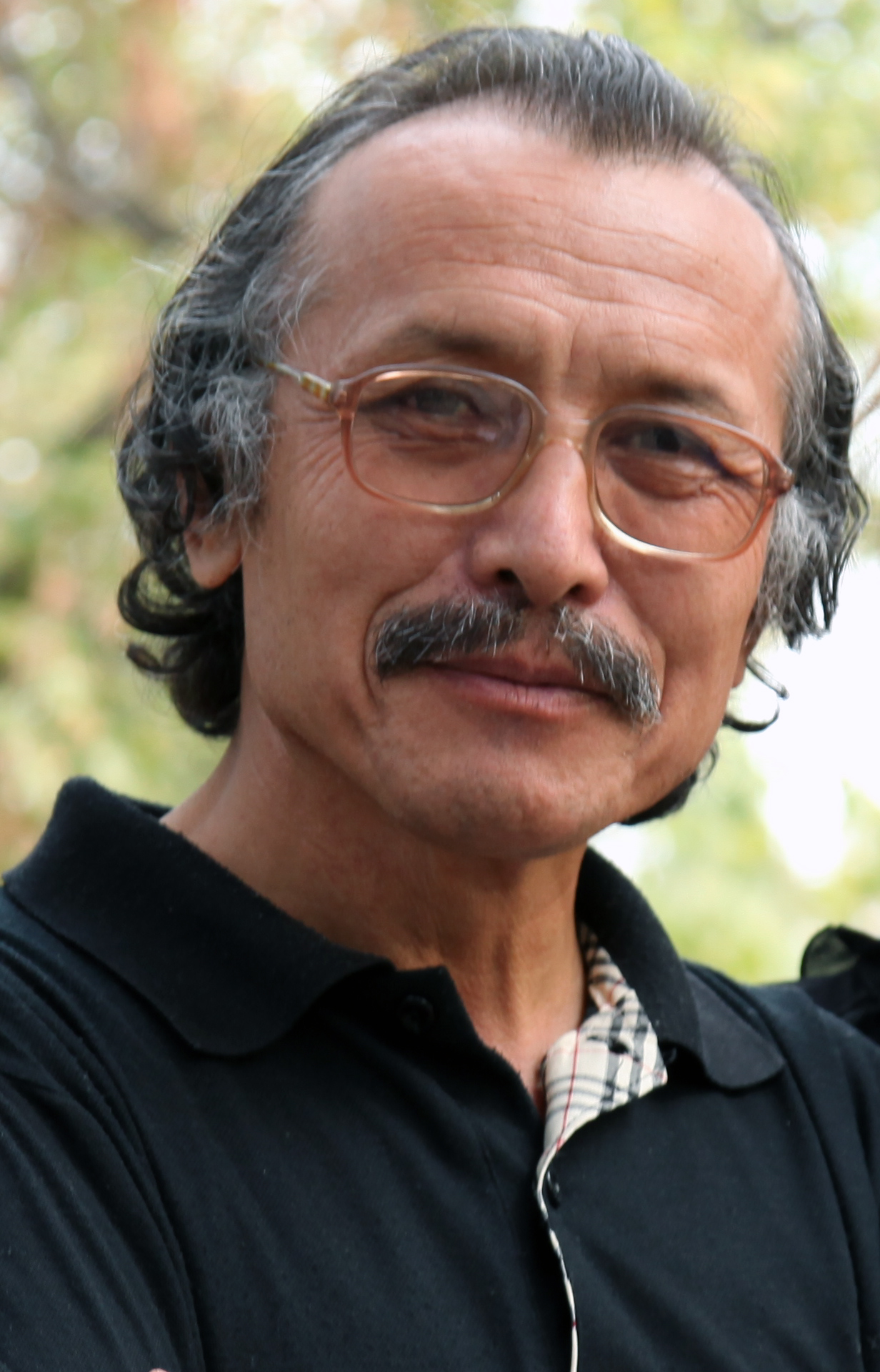
- Born: January 1, 1955; Minbulak v., Naryn Region, Kirgiz SSR, Soviet Union
- Education: Tashkent State Institute of Theatre and Arts named after A.N. Ostrovsky
- Occupations: Kyrgyz writer-screenwriter, playwright, theatrical and director, screenwriter, producer, editor, journalist, and theater critic.
- Years active: 1975 — present

Janysh Osmonovich Kulmambetov (Kyrgyz and Russian: Жаныш Осмонович Кулмамбетов;) (born 1955) is a Kyrgyz writer-screenwriter, playwright, stage and film director, screenwriter, producer, editor, journalist, and theater critic.

He holds a Doctor of Philosophy in Cultural Studies and was named People's Writer of the Kyrgyz Republic (2021).

== Biography ==
After graduating from high school, Janysh entered the theatre school at Kyrgyz State Academic Drama Theater (in Frunze), from which he graduated in 1974 with honors. From 1975-82, he studied at the Department of Theater at the Tashkent Theatre and Arts Institute of A.N. Ostrovsky (in Tashkent), graduating with honors. From 1989-92, he attended graduate school at the All-Union Scientific Research Institute of Art (in Moscow).

== Creativity ==
According to his memoirs, Kulmambetov began to try his hand at writing in sixth grade His first play, Stolen Fire, was broadcast in 1976 in the Republican radio broadcast of Kyrgyzstan, and was later staged.

Since then, he has written more than a dozen plays for radio, and a total of more than 50 dramatic works. His plays have been performed and published in Kyrgyzstan, Tajikistan and Kazakhstan, and Armenia. In addition to plays, Kulmambetov's work includes novels, stories and screenplays. He has translated works by Molière, Oscar Wilde, Viktor Rozov, and other authors.

Central to the work of Kulmambetov are themes of figures of Kyrgyz history.

Kulmambetov also directs theatrically. He has staged a number of performances, including Jaisan and Ademi. Since 2000, he has made more than twenty films (feature, documentary), and others.

In 2012, he won first prize at the international competition scenarios, based on fairy tales, legends and epics of the peoples of Asia - Asia 2012, with a script full-length feature film Stone of my country.

== Literary works ==
=== Drama ===
- 2020 - Bloody day
- 2019 — Legends of Issyk-Kul
- 2018 - The Curse of Surechka - winner in the nomination "Best National Play", the national theater award "Erguu" ("Inspiration"), in 2019
- 2018 - Night letter
- 2016 - Osmon and Olga ( Osmon menen Olga)
- 2016 - Osmon and Olga ( Osmon menen Olga)
- 2016 - American bride (Amerikalyk kelin)
- 2015 - Mother, my Manas -2 (Kagylayyn Manas -2!)!
- 2015 - Japanese is
- 2014 - Revenge of the girls (Kyzdardyn өchү)
- 2014 - Mountain Girl (Tooluk Kiz)
- 2013 - My homeland Stone
- 2012 - Do not be afraid, Mokocho (Не бойся Мокочо)
- 2012 - Gold jug (inspired by folk tales) (Алтын кумара)
- 2012 - Groom (Күйөө бала)
- 2011 - Three brothers and peri (Үч биртууган менен перизат)
- 2011 – Lovers (Кыз-жигит)
- 2011 - Silent Witness (Тили каткан адам)
- 2011- The Wizard and the dog (Волшебник и пес)
- 2011 - Five younger wives (Беш токол)
- 2011 - History of the suicide bomber (История шахидки)
- 2010 – 2011 - Alai queen (Алай ханышасы)
- 2010 - Wind, wind do not carry away (Шамал, шамал жулба, ыйлатып)
- 2010 - He returned from the city (Ал шаардан келгенде)
- 2009 - The Mystery Cave (Сырдуу үңкүр)
- 2009- Kezkaman and Kekchekez or Traitors (on the epic "Manas") (Көзкаман менен Көкчөкөз)
- 2008 - Han Zhakyp (on the epic "Manas") (Хан Жакып)
- 2008 -Day of the apocalypse (Oh, great Ameterasu, save Antigone!) (Ааламат келген күн же о-о,

улуу Амэтерасу, Антигонуну сакта!)

- 2008 - Iparhan-Xiang Fei (Ипархан – Сянь-Фэй)
- 2007- Scaffold (Эшафот)
- 2007 - People in the twilight (Күүгүмдөгү кишилер)
- 2007- New Journey (Жаңы саякат)
- 2007- You are alive, captain? (Эсенсиңби, есаул?!)
- 2007 - Kurmanbek (for small Kyrgyz epic "Kurmanbek") (Курманбек)
- 2006- Shooting in Aqsy, or black dark days of Bospiek (Аксыдагы атуу же Боспиектеги карантүн)
- 2006 - We are with you ... (Биз, экөөбүз)
- 2006- Southerner (Түштүктүк кыз)
- 2006- On the night (Ошол түнү)
- 2005 - Kanat and Zarina (Канат менен Зарина)
- 2004 - The talent and destiny (Талант жана тагдыр)
- 2003 - Grey Wolf and Goats (based on folk tales) (Серый волк и козлята)
- 2002 - When life goes ... (Өмүр бизден өтүп кетсе...)
- 2000 - And there is an old song over the steppe (Чөл үсүтндө ошол эски ыр калды)
- 2000 - Little Red Riding Hood (by Charles Perrault) (Кызыл топу, Ш.Перронуку боюнча)
- 1998-1999 - Chingiz and Bubusara (Чыңгыз менен Бүбүсайра)
- 1996 - Damn you, JanylMirza - Salome! (Каргыш тийсин сага, Жаңыл Мырза – Саломея!)
- 1994 - The fate of an actress (Актрисанын тагдыры)
- 1993- Just Mayrash (Жөн эле Майраш)
- 1991 - Manas, my dear! (Кагылайын, Манасым!)
- 1990 - The hidden secret of Chingis Khan (Чыңгыз хандын купуя сыры)
- 1990 - Daughter Umaya (Умайдын кызы)
- 1988 - Munabiya (Мунабия, co-authored with K.Akmatov)
- 1988 - When Manas became Manas ... (Манас, Манас болгону...)
- 1987 - Education (Тарбия)
- 1987 - My poor tale (Бечера менин жомогум)
- 1986 - Boomerang (Бумеранг же бир кылмыштын тарыхы)
- 1984 - Croak frog (Чардагыла, бакалар!)
- 1983 - Holy my mother (Ыйыгым менин - апакем)
- 1980 - I brought you a cat (Мен сизге мышык алып келдим)
- 1979 - Beautiful World (Кереметтүү дүйнө)
- 1979 - Bear (Мамалак)
- 1978 - Our Telibay (Биздин Телибай)
- 1978 - Blue mane (Көк кулун)
- 1977 - Mannequins (Манекендер)
- 1977 - Guard (Корукчу)
- 1976 - Welcome the fairy tale! (Жашасын, жомок!)
- 1976 - Stolen Fire (Уурдалган от)

=== Prose ===
- 2005 - Unfamiliar ghost (novel thriller)
- 1996- The daughter of General
- 1992- Particularly dangerous criminal
- 1991- Bloody love
- 1991 - A lone crane

=== Screenplays ===
- 2021 - Sagyndyk: life turned into a legend
- 2021 - Zhanyl Myrza
- 2020 - Suimenkul
- 2018 - We, with you
- 2016 - The childhood of Manas (Manastyn ball chagy, 52 series)
- 2015 - Japanese is
- 2015- Revenge girls (Kyzdardyn өchү)
- 2014 - Wild girl (Жапайы селки)
- 2014 - Dangerous gorge (Коркунучтуу капчыгай)
- 2013 - Our crazy comedy (Биздин боорду эзген комедиябыз)
- 2012 - Stone of my Motherland (Мекенимдин ташы)
- 2012 - Prince of my daughter (Кызымдын ханзадасы)
- 2011 2012 - Curse (Каргыш)
- 2011 - Lovers (Кыз-жигит)
- 2011 - Stir of younger wives (Токолдор тополоңу)
- 2010 - I believe in you (Мен сага ишенем)
- 2010 - Shot on Sonkul (Соңкөлдөгү атуу)
- 2010 - Wounded Cranes (Жараланган турналар)
- 2010 - Train of my hope (Үмүтүмдүн поезди)
- 2009 - Shooting in Aqsy, or black days of Bospiek (Аксыдагы атуу же Боспиектеги карантүн)
- 2008 - Osmon and Olga (Осмон менен Ольга)
- 2008 - Chingiz and Bubusara (Чыңгыз менен Бүбүсайра)
- 2007 - Bloody love (Кандуу сүйүү)
- 2002 - Particularly dangerous criminal (Өтө коркунучтуу кылмышкер)

== Theatrical production ==
- 2016 - Once in the village Koshalak (Кошалактагы окуя)
- 2012 - Do not be afraid, Mokocho (Не бойся Мокочо)
- 2011 - The Wizard and the dog (Волшебник и пес)
- 2011 - Alai queen (Алай ханышасы)
- 2010 - He returned from the city (Ал шаардан келгенде)
- 2009 - My Confession (Менин сырым)
- 2008 - Iparhan-Xiang Fei (Ипархан – Сянь - Фэй)
- 2007 - Bloody love (Кандуу сүйүү)
- 2007 - Shooting in Aqsy, or black dark days of Bospiek (Аксыдагы атуу же Боспиектеги карантүн)
- 2006 - On the night (Ошол түнү)
- 2005 - Chingiz and Bubusara (Чыңгыз менен Бүбүсайра)
- 2002 - Bloody love (Кровавая любовь)
- 1997 - Damn you, Janyl Mirza - Salome! (Каргыш тийсин сага, Жаңыл Мырза – Саломея!)

== Filmography ==
- 2021 - Sagyndyk: life turned into a legend (d/f)
- 2019 - American Bride
- 2018 - We, with you
- 2016 - The childhood of Manas (animated film)
- 2015 - Japanese is
- 2015 - Revenge of the girls (Kyzdardyn өchү)
- 2014 - Wild girl (Жапайы селки)
- 2014 - Dangerous gorge (Коркунучтуу капчыгай)
- 2013 - Kamikaze-psychos (Камикадзе - психи)
- 2013 - Prince of my daughter (Kүйөө balls - Water Carrier – Күйөө балам - водовоз)
- 2012-2013 - Wounded cranes 2 (Zharalangan turnalar-2)
- 2012 - Your language - the language of Manas (Senin tiliң-Manastyn Styles, c / m)
- 2012 - An unknown ghost (Beytaanysh arbak)
- 2012 - Return of prodigal daughter (Побег блудной девочки)
- 2011 - Love (Kiz-zhigit)
- 2011 - Dash because younger women (Токолдор тополоңу)
- 2011 - I believe in you (Мен сага ишенем)
- 2010 - Wounded cranes (Zharalangan turnalar)
- 2009 - Bloody Love 2 (Кандуу сүйүү - 2)
- 2008 - Chingiz and Bubusara (Чыңгыз менен Бүбүсайра)
- 2007 - Bloody love (Кандуу сүйүү)

== Citations ==
- Who is Who: Kulmambetov, literatura.kg. Accessed November 15, 2022.
- "Janysh Kulmambetov: I like being free". MSN. October 28, 2005. Archived from the original on 2016-03-04.
- Sergei Zeylyuk (April 24, 2009). "After all, Aitmatov predicted!". IslamRF.ru.
- Alexander Vasylkova (January 18, 2012). "JanyshKulmambetov, director: Shameful no excuses". Evening Bishkek.
