= The Wedding Chest =

- Directed by: Nurbek Egen
- Produced by: Axel Moebius, Christoph Thoke
- Edited by: Marat Magambetov
- Music by: Alexei Aigui
- Release date: 2005
- Countries: Kyrgyzstan; Russia; France
- Languages: Kyrgyz; Russian; French

The Wedding Chest (Russian: Сундук предков) is a 2005 Kyrgyzstani film directed by Nurbek Egen. It was Kyrgyzstan's submission to the 79th Academy Awards for the Academy Award for Best Foreign Language Film, as well as its first submission to the Academy in its history, but it was not accepted as a nominee.

== See also ==
- List of submissions to the 79th Academy Awards for Best Foreign Language Film
