= A Father's Will =

2016 film

- Film poster
- Directed by: Bakyt Mukul; Dastan Zhapar Uulu
- Written by: Dastan Zhapar Uulu; Bakyt Mukul
- Starring: Iman Mukul; Marat Alyshbaev; Taalai Kasymaliev; Bakyt Mukul; Tynara Abdrazaeva; Diana Sabyrbekova
- Cinematography: Akjol Bekbolotov
- Edited by: Aktan Ryskeldiev
- Release date: 25 August 2016 (Montreal)
- Running time: 112 minutes
- Country: Kyrgyzstan
- Languages: Kyrgyz; English

A Father's Will (Kyrgyz: Atanyn Kereezi) is a 2016 Kyrgyzstani drama film directed by Bakyt Mukul and Dastan Zhapar Uulu. The film was selected as the Kyrgyzstani entry for the Best Foreign Language Film at the 89th Academy Awards but it was not nominated.

== See also ==
- List of submissions to the 89th Academy Awards for Best Foreign Language Film
- List of Kyrgyzstani submissions for the Academy Award for Best International Feature Film
