= Aktan Abdykalykov =

Kyrgyz screenwriter and film director

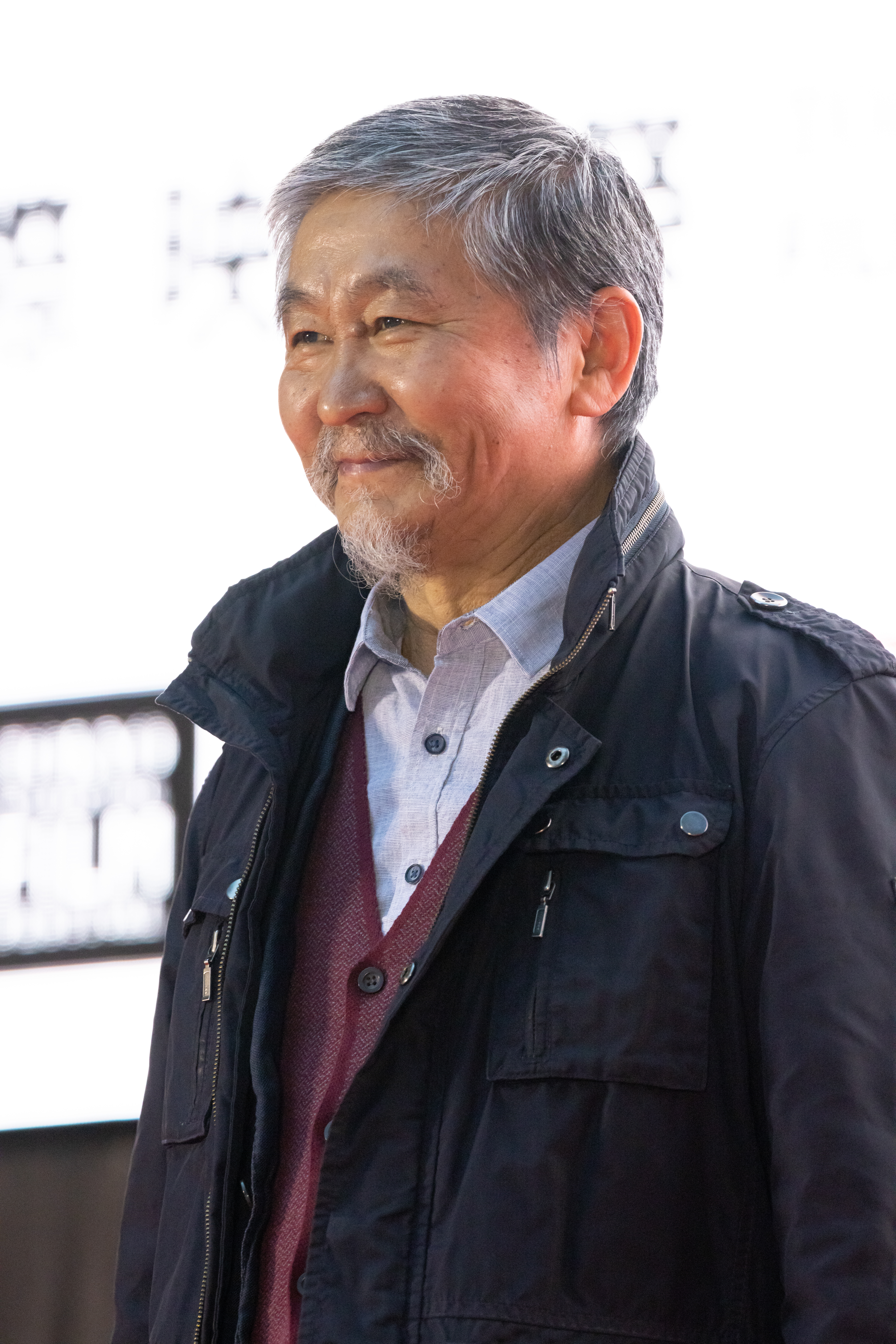
- Aktan Arym Kubat in 2022
- Born: Aktan Abdykalykov; 26 March 1957 (age 69); Kirgiz SSR, Soviet Union
- Occupations: Film director, screenwriter, actor
- Notable work: Beshkempir (1998), Maimyl/The Chimp (2001), The Light Thief (2010), Centaur (2017)

Aktan Arym Kubat (Kyrgyz: Актан Арым Кубат; born March 26, 1957, Sokuluk District, Kirghiz SSR), also known as Aktan Abdykalykov, is a Kyrgyzstani director, screenwriter and actor. Member of the National Film Academy of the Kyrgyzstan, acting Member of the European Film Academy, acting Member of Asia Pacific Screen Academy.

Aktan Arym Kubat has received many industry awards, including Silver Leopard at the Locarno Film Festival, Bronze Lion at the Cannes Lions International Festival of Creativity, the FIPRESCI Prizes from International Federation of Film Critics, and the Findling Award; he was a participant of Un Certain Regard and Lа Quinzaine des Realisateurs at the Cannes Film Festival, Panorama section at the Berlin International Film Festival and other festivals.

Best known for the films Beshkempir/The Adopted Son (1998), Maimyl/The Chimp (2001), The Light Thief (2010), Centaur (2017).

In 2016, Aktan Arym Kubat was recognized as one of the best directors in Asia, and Beshkempir/The Adopted Son entered the top 100 Asian films of all time, released by the Busan International Film Festival, which conducted a survey among 73 prominent film professionals, film critics, festival executives, programmers and directors.

== Biography ==
Born in 1957, Aktan Arym Kubat was 13 when he learned that his mother and father were not his biological parents. Later, he explained in Russian that it was customary in his country for parents of a large family to offer a baby boy to an infertile couple. (Baby girls are considered undesirable.) In a time-honored ritual, five old women pass around the infant and name him Beshkempir. His birth mother was a geography teacher who already had nine children and so gave away her 8-month-old son to her brother. Kubat had a carefree childhood with no boundaries between him and his pals. He studied the required Russian language in school and roughhoused with other boys in the dusty, primitive village of Kuntu, where he still lives. Everyone told him he was fated to be an artist, and he would wish on a falling star, he said, that it would become true. As a youngster, he enjoyed the Russian and Indian movies shown at the little theater in his village. (In one scene in Beshkempir, villagers watch in wonder as a movie, showing a gaudy Indian song and dance number, is projected onto an outdoor screen.) He thought of films as windows to another world, he said.

In 1974, Aktan Arym Kubat graduated from Dzhamgerchinov High School, in the village of Kuntuu, and then went to Kyrgyz State Fine Arts College named after S. A. Chuykov, major in “Professor of painting and technical drawing”. After graduation, in 1980 he studied at the Creative Arts Workshop of People's Artist of the USSR Gapar Aitiev in Bishkek. In 1981, he started working as a set decorator, production designer at the Kyrgyzfilm. In the 1990s, he also proved to be a capable director who highlights his country's pressing issues from a poetic angle.

In 1990, Aktan Arym Kubat made his directorial debut with a 17-minute film The Dog was Running documentary under the production of Kyrgyzfilm, co-authored with Erkin Ryspaev, and in 1992 he released his first feature film Where is your home?. The Swing, his second feature, a semi-autobiographical tale about the discovery of the world by an 11-year-old boy who is infatuated with an older girl, won the Grand Prize for the best short film at the Locarno Film Festival in the competition section for short films in 1993 and the FIPRESCI Prize at the Torino Film Festival. This event gave Aktan Arym Kubat an opportunity to meet his French producer Cédomir Kolar, who later became the main producer of his main films. Five years later in 1998 at the Locarno Film Festival he won a Silver Leopard for Beshkempir/The Adopted Son, which also competed at the Karlovy Vary International Film Festival in the East of the West Competition. In 2001 Maimyl/The Chimp was selected to Un Certain Regard in Cannes and was nominated by the European Film Academy for the Discovery Award. The Light Thief, in which Aktan Arym Kubat took the lead role, premiered at Director's Fortnight in Cannes, won numerous awards and was screened in many festivals such as Locarno, Toronto, Montreal, Viennale, Doha and others. In 2017 this experience in front of the camera had a great effect once again in Centaur, which premiered in Berlinale's Panorama section and won CICAE Award at Berlinale IFF, “Best Actor” award at Asian World Film Festival in USA and other prestigious awards.

In 1998, Aktan Arym Kubat created his own studio named Beshkempir. Since 2004, he is a founder and art director of the Oy Art producing company.

Mirlan Abdykalykov, the son of Aktan Arym Kubat, played the lead role in his autobiographical trilogy The Swing, Beshkempir/The Adopted Son and Maimyl/The Chimp. In the interview during the Rotterdam Film Festival in January 2002, Aktan Arym Kubat said: "... It was like the periods of my life: childhood, adolescence and becoming an adult... The events of The Swing were drawn from direct experiences. I was an adopted son and I had the nickname ape, the chimp. Furthermore, when I was a young boy, I was in love with my neighbour and I followed here everywhere... Another painful memory from my childhood that found its way to the film is growing up with an alcoholic father... This is an autobiographical trilogy, I thought of someone closest to me to interpret my ideas, feelings and emotions, and I chose my son..."

In the next films The Light Thief and Centaur, Aktan Arym Kubat played the lead roles himself.

== Social work ==
Aktan Arym Kubat actively participates in public activities in the field of cinema, he is one of the initiators and developers of the Target Program “Kyrgyzstan's Cinematography - 2010”, which has key segments such as education in cinema, film production, technical equipment, distribution and promotion of cinema, copyright, popularization of the author cinema in Kyrgyzstan. Since 2005, as a founding member of Public Organization "Cinema Development Fund" he participated in the development and implementation of such projects as “DVD-collection Kyrgyz Miracle” - restoration, digitalization and English subtitling of 10 best Kyrgyz classic films", "Art House Film Festival", "Film directors’ courses", "Training program for film producers and art managers" and other various master-classes and courses for cinematographers.

== Honors ==
- Laureate of Manas Order of the Second Degree (Kyrgyzstan)
- Laureate of the Toktogul State Award (Kyrgyzstan)
- Laureate of the Youth Union Prize (Kyrgyzstan)

== Filmography and awards (selected) ==
| Year | Title | Role | Notes | Awards |
|---|---|---|---|---|
| 1990 | The Dog was Running | Co-director, co-whiter | Documentary film | Grand Prix at the International Film Festival of Baku (Azerbaijan) |
| 1992 | Where is Your Home? | Director | Feature film | Jury Prize at the International Film Festival in Ashgabat (Turkmenistan) |
| 1993 | The Swing | Director, co-writer | Short film | Grand Prix for the best short film at the Locarno Film Festival FIPRESCI Prize - Special Mention: “For the human message and strong ascetic images, which put silent black and white cinema language in a modern context” at the Torino Film Festival Grand Prix at the Potsdam International Film Festival (Germany) |
| 1996 | Let's Work Together | Director, screenwriter | Public advertising | Grand Prix at the Moscow International Advertising Festival (Russia) Bronze Lion at the Cannes Lions International Festival of Creativity |
| 1996 | Alakandai Elibis, Yntymaktuu Bololu | Director, screenwriter | Public advertising | First Prize in the Nomination “Public Advertising” at the Moscow International Advertising Festival (Russia) |
| 1997 | Hassan-Hussen | Director, screenwriter | Short film | Grand Prix at The Siena International Short Film Festival (Italy) Jury Prize at the Chicago International Children's Film Festival Audience Award at the Castellinaria International Festival of Young Cinema (Switzerland) |
| 1998 | Beshkempir/The Adopted Son | Director, co-writer | Feature film | Silver Leopard at the Locarno Film Festival Don Quijote Award from International Federation of Film Societies Grand Prix at the Eurasia International Film Festival Audience Prize, Jury Prize at the Vienna International Film Festival Asian film Juries Award at the Tokyo International Film Festival Grand Prix at the Cottbus Film Festival of Young East European Cinema Audience Award, Procirep Award, European Cities' Jury Award at the Angers European First Film Festival (1999) Jury Prize for the Artistic Contribution at the Buenos Aires International Festival of Independent Cinema Silver Film Can Young Cinema Award, FIPRESCI Prize and NETPAC AWARD - Special Mention: “For its refreshing approach to building character and depicting sexual awakening through its poetic documentation of village life, respectfully and lovingly observed through its stunning black and white cinematography.” at the Singapore International Film Festival (1999) Grand Prix, Audience Award at the Ljubljana International Film Festival (1999) Grand Prix at the Belgrade International Author's Film Festival (Yugoslavia) |
| 2000 | The Stop | Director, co-writer | Short film | Jury Prize for the Best Short Film at the Anapa International Film Festival (Russia) Jury Prize at the Cottbus International Film Festival (Germany) |
| 2001 | The Chimp | Director, co-writer | Feature film | Participation in the Un Certain Regard section at the Cannes International Film Festival Grand Prix at the International Film Festival in Yalta (Ukraine) Jury Prize for the Best Scenario at the Anapa International Film Festival (Russia) Jury Award for Best Director at Minsk International Film Festival Listapad Jury Special Prize at the Festroia International Film Festival FIPRESCI Prize - Special Mention: “For a humorous yet melancholic portrayal of a young man disillusioned with a traumatized former Soviet Republic” at the Bratislava International Film Festival |
| 2008 | The Bride | Story by, co-writer | Feature film | |
| 2010 | Svet-ake/The Light Thief | Director, co-writer, lead actor | Feature film | Participation in the official section Director's Fortnight at the Cannes International Film Festival Grand Prix and FIPRESCI Prize at the Eurasia International Film Festival Grand Prix at the Didor International Film Festival Best Actor Prize and Film Critics and Film Experts Prize at Kinoshok IFF (Russia) Audience Award at Cottbus IFF (Germany) Special Jury Prize at Amiens IFF (France) Jury Prize Bronze Alhambra at the Cines del Sur IFF Grand Prix at the Rabat IFF (Marocco) |
| 2011 | Mother's Heaven | Director | Feature film | World Premiere at the Karlovy Vary International Film Festival |
| 2015 | Heavenly Nomadic | Co-writer | Feature film | Best Screenplay at Ak Ilbirs National Film Awards |
| 2017 | Centaur | Director, co-writer, lead actor | Feature film | CICAE Award: "This is a film which completely fulfils the CICAE award criteria. The beautiful rural landscape has a history behind and dangers in front. The hero who proudly believes in this values acts single-handedly and makes a legend. The community responds to this action and the drama takes form. Those who help him and those who oppose him are all parts of same origin. We think that the film is very important to be seen by a huge audience, because our knowledge of ancient stories and values - who we are and where we come from - is an antidote against conflict.” at the Berlinale International Film Festival Grand Prix at MOOOV IFF (Belgium) Best Director Award and NETPAC Award: “For the brave incarnation of the traditions of the past and the organic transformation of them into the context of contemporary spiritual values.” at the Eurasia International Film Festival Best Actor at the Asian World Film Festival Best Film, Best Director, Best Screenplay, Best Actress at Ak Ilbirs National Film Awards |
| 2025 | Black Red Yellow Кара Кызыл Сары | Co-writer | Feature film | Kyrgyzstani entry for the Best International Feature Film at the 98th Academy Awards. |
