= Beshkempir =

Beshkempir the Adopted Son
- Directed by: Aktan Abdykalykov
- Written by: Aktan Abdykalykov; Avtandil Adikulov; Marat Sarulu
- Produced by: Irizbaj Alybayev; Marc Baschet; Frédérique Dumas; Cédomir Kolar
- Starring: Mirlan Abdykalykov (Beshkempir); Adir Abilkassimov; Mirlan Cinkozoev; Bakit Dzhylkychiev; Albina Imasheva (Aynura)
- Cinematography: Khassan Kydyraliev
- Edited by: Tilek Mambetova
- Music by: Nurlan Nishanov
- Distributed by: Kyrgyzfilm; Noé Production
- Release date: 1998
- Running time: 81 minutes
- Country: Kyrgyzstan
- Language: Kyrgyz

Beshkempir (released as Beshkempir the Adopted Son in Anglophone countries, Le fils adoptif: Beshkempir in Francophone countries) is a 1998 Kyrgyzstani film. Shot and produced in Kyrgyzstan, it is representative of the first wave of independently produced cinema in the country after its independence from Soviet Union. It was directed by Aktan Abdykalykov, and stars the director's son Mirlan Abdykalykov in the lead role. This simple bildungsroman went on to receive critical acclaim, and won numerous international awards including the Silver Leopard Prize at the 1998 Locarno International Film Festival. The film was selected as the Kyrgyzstani entry for the Best Foreign Language Film at the 71st Academy Awards, but was not accepted as a nominee.

== Plot ==
The film starts with an adoption ceremony presided over by five old women (Beshkempir literally means "five grandmothers"), in a village in Kyrgyzstan. The movie then flashes forward a decade or so to show the coming of age of the adopted child - Beshkempir. He is shown indulging in childhood pranks and activities with friends in a rural setting, like stealing honey from beehives and going to watch screened Hindi movies. However, approaching adolescence leads the boys to spy on a village woman's breasts, make clay models of the female form and pretend to make love and eye girls. Beshkempir is even shown as the message carrier between an older boy and his girlfriend.

Rivalry over a girl Aynura leads to Beshkempir's friend divulging the fact of his adoption to Beshkempir by calling Beshkempir a foundling, who had been unaware of his roots till then. Even though his grandmother denies the story, Beshkempir is upset, and this leads to numerous scuffles with his friend. Hostility is also shown between Beshkempir's adoptive mother and his friend's mother on numerous occasions, culminating in the friend's mother coming to Beshkempir's house to complain about Beshkempir beating up his son.

Beshkempir's adoptive father beats Beshkempir over the incident, who runs away and joins a fisherman. Meanwhile, Beshkempir's grandmother dies and asks that Beshkempir be told the truth in her will. Beshkempir is located and brought home, and is reconciled with adoptive family and friends. The funeral ceremony shows Beshkempir suddenly growing up by giving the customary speech at the funeral where he pledges to repay his grandmother's debts (if any) and to forgo any outstanding debts to his grandmother. The film ends with Beshkempir courting Aynura and a brief shot of an engagement ceremony.

== Critical appeal ==
The film is a bildungsroman, treating universal issues of growing up in a rural landscape. The movie shows little or no Kyrgyzstan-specific footage, except for a brief glimpse of money at one point. However, it depicts several Kyrgyz customs - including the ceremony of placing a baby in a cradle (beshike saluu), the funerary ceremony and the engagement ceremony. The ceremonies depict several ethnic Kyrgyz artifacts, like the tekemet rugs of the region, the kigiz felt carpets and the Kyrgyz cradle or beshik.

The storytelling is simple and direct, and the plentiful visuals of nature and village life is complemented by soundtrack recordings of accentuated village sounds and the sounds of nature. The film is shot in black and white, occasionally interspersed with color sequences. The color sequences typically depict colorful focal themes like the girl Aynura, colorful Tekemet rugs, or a hoopoe (a kind of bird). Some critics have placed the film in the Neorealist school.

Most of the shooting took place on location in the village of Bar-Boulak in Kyrgyzstan.

== Awards ==
The film won several awards in international film festivals, including:

- The Findling Award, 1998
- The Silver Leopard Prize at the Locarno International Film Festival in Switzerland, 1998
- The Jury Award for Artistic Contribution at the Buenos Aires International Festival of Independent Films in Argentina, 1999
- The Silver Film Can Award and the FIPRESSI Award at the Singapore International Film Festival, 1999

== See also ==
- List of submissions to the 71st Academy Awards for Best Foreign Language Film
- List of Kyrgyzstani submissions for the Academy Award for Best International Feature Film
