= Nurbek Egen =

Kyrgyz and Russian film and TV director and screenwriter

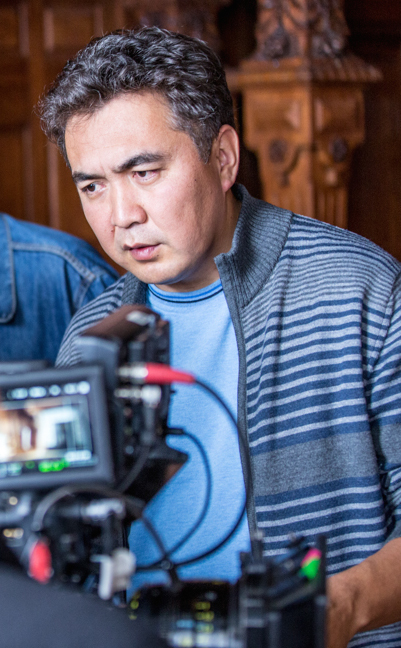
Egen at work

Nurbek Egen (Kyrgyz and Russian: Нурбек Эген) is a Kyrgyz and Russian film director and screenwriter. His films have won two Young Artist Awards: his short film Sanzhyra as Best Short Foreign Film and his feature film The Wedding Chest as Outstanding International Drama. Nurbek Egen's television series Alibi is the winner of the Golden Eagle Award for 2023 in the nominations "Best TV Series" and "Best Actor in a TV Series" - Evgeny Stychkin.

== Biography ==
Nurbek Egen was born in Osh Oblast, Kirghiz SSR. Having graduated from Physics and Mathematics school, he studied acting at Arts Institute in Bishkek for two years. In 1994 he entered the Faculty of Directing at Russian State University of Cinematography (VGIK) and studied under the guidance of Vladimir Khotinenko. He graduated from VGIK in 2000. In 2009-2010 he studied Directing at New York Film Academy in Los Angeles, US.

While studying at VGIK, Egen made his short films One Day Older (1998) and Closed Space (1999). His short film Sanzhyra has been a part of competition programs of more than 50 international festivals and received the Best Short Foreign Film Award at the Young Artist Awards in Los Angeles.

The Wedding Chest, Egen's feature film about Aydar who came back from Paris to his native ail with his French bride Isabelle, received the Best Foreign Film Award at the Young Artist Awards in Los Angeles, USA, as well as the Audience Award at the Cottbus Film Festival, Germany. FBW (Deutsche Film- und Medienbewertung), a German federal authority for evaluating and rating film and media, rated the film with the certification mark Wertvoll (valuable) for its high artistic quality.

In his works, Nurbek Egen repeatedly turns to his native culture and traditions. Modern social and political life of Kyrgyzstan, as well as its background and cultural past, are reflected in his documentary film The Birth of Manas as a Presentiment.

Egen's social drama The Empty Home (2012) brings up one of the most relevant and sensitive issues - emigration, interpenetration and mutual rejection of different cultures, national identity. The film won the Best Feature Film Award at the 10th Shaken's Stars International Film Festival in Almaty, Kazakhstan.

Egen's The Wedding Chest and The Empty Home were Kyrgyzstan's submissions for the Academy Award for Best Foreign Language Film in the years 2006 and 2012, respectively.

Egen is currently engaged in active filmmaking and TV production.

== Awards ==
- 1998 - Camerimage International Film Festival in Toruń, Poland - Bronze Tadpole award (One Day Older)
- 1998 - Fifth St. Anna Festival for Student and Debut Films - Festival First Prize (One Day Older)
- 1998 - 18th VGIK Festival in Moscow, Russia - Special Kodak Award "For Camera Expressiveness" (One Day Older)
- 1998 - Message to Man International Film Festival in St. Petersburg, Russia
- 1998 - Tous Ecrans International Film Festival in Geneva, Switzerland
- 2001 - nomination for entry for Best Student film at Student Academy Awards
- 2001 - VIII St. Anna Festival for Student and Debut Films - Union of Cinematographers of Russia Special prize "For following the humanistic tradition of national cinema" (Sanzhyra)
- 2001 - Ciné Сinécourt International Film Festival in Aix-en-Provence, France - Jury Special Prize / Prix Ciné Cinécourts (Sanzhyra)
- 2001 - International Film Festival in Amiens, France (Sanzhyra)
- 2001 - 51st Berlin International Film Festival, Germany - Kinderfilmfest (Sanzhyra)
- 2001 - 36th Karlovy Vary International Film Festival, Czech Republic (Sanzhyra)
- 2001 - International Festival in Capalbio, Italy - Jury special prize (Sanzhyra)
- 2002 – Young Artist Awards International Film Festival in Los Angeles, USA – Best Short Foreign Film (Sanzhyra)
- 2002 - 16th Fribourg International Film Festival, Switzerland (Sanzhyra)
- 2002 - Edinburgh International Film Festival, UK (Sanzhyra)
- 2002 - The Montreal World Film Festival, Canada (Sanzhyra)
- 2002 - Barcelona International Environmental Film Festival (FICMA), Spain - Best Short Film Award (Sanzhyra)
- 2002 - International Film Festival in Biarritz, France - Second Prize (Sanzhyra)
- 2002 - International Film Festival in Libya - First Prize for best short film (Sanzhyra)
- 2002 - Festival for Debut Films Spirit of Fire in Khanty-Mansiysk, Russia - Best Shot Film Award (Sanzhyra)
- 2005 - Nomination for entry for Best Foreign film at the Academy Awards (The Wedding Chest)
- 2006 - Young Artist Awards International Film Festival in Los Angeles, USA - Outstanding International Drama Award (The Wedding Chest)
- 2006 - Cottbus Film Festival of Young East European Cinema, Germany - Audience Award, Main Prize nomination (The Wedding Chest)
- 2006 - 41st Karlovy Vary International Film Festival, Czech Republic - competition programme (The Wedding Chest)
- 2006 - Open Film Festival of CIS countries, Latvia, Lithuania, Estonia "Kinoshock" in Anapa - Special Jury Diploma, Prize for Best Director Debut (The Wedding Chest)
- 2006 - 2nd Golden Minbar International Film Festival in Kazan, Russia - Best cinematographer Award, Special prize of the President of the Republic of Tatarstan for Humanism in Cinema Art (The Wedding Chest)
- 2006 - Zolotoy Vityaz International Film Forum in Serpukhov, Russia - Silver Vityaz Award, Best cinematographer Award, Best Actor Award (The Wedding Chest)
- 2006 - Amur Autumn Film and Theater Festival in Blagoveshchensk, Russia - Best scriptwriter Award (The Wedding Chest)
- 2006 - 3rd Eurasia International Film Festival in Almaty, Kazakhstan - Jury Special Award (The Wedding Chest)
- 2006 - New Cinema Film Festival - Best Directing Award (The Wedding Chest)
- 2006 - Minsk International Film Festival "Listapad", Belarus - Special Award "Film Without Borders" (The Wedding Chest)
- 2006 - International Film Festival in Sevastopol, Ukraine - Audience Award (The Wedding Chest)
- 2007 – FBW (Filmbewertungsstelle Wiesbaden), Germany – certification mark Wertvoll (The Wedding Chest)
- 2011 - 15th Russian Festival of Visual Arts - Children Jury Special Award for Best Male Performance (It Doesn't Hurt A Fighter)
- 2011 - Moscow Premiere Film Festival - Audience Award (It Doesn't Hurt A Fighter)
- 2012 - 10th Krasnogorsk Festival of Sports Films - Best Directing Award (It Doesn't Hurt A Fighter)
- 2012 - Russian film festival of children's films "Detskiy Kinomay" - Best Child Actor Performance Award (It Doesn't Hurt A Fighter)
- 2012 - Volokolamsky Rubezh International festival of military-patriotic films named after S.F. Bondarchuk - Audience Award (Kalachi)
- 2012 - Smile, Russia! Film Festival - Most Patriotic Comedy Award (Kalachi)
- 2012 - 10th Shaken's Stars International Film Festival in Almaty, Kazakhstan - Best Feature Film Award (The Empty Home)
- 2013 - Osaka Asian Film Festival, Japan - Grand-Prix Nomination (The Empty Home)
- 2013 - Sofia International Film Festival, Bulgaria - Grand-Prix Nomination (The Empty Home)

== Filmography ==
=== Director ===
- 1997 - One Day Older (short film)
- 2001 - Sanzhyra (short film)
- 2002 - Villises (television film)
- 2003 - Secret Sign (television film)
- 2005 - The Wedding Chest (feature film)
- 2008 - Network (television film)
- 2010 - Birth of Manas as a presentiment (documentary film)
- 2010 - It Doesn't Hurt A Fighter (feature film)
- 2011 - Kalachi (feature film)
- 2012 - The Empty Home (feature film)
- 2013 - Mine (feature film)
- 2016 - Versus (feature film)
- 2017 - Two Against the Death (television Film)
- 2018 - The Harbor
- 2019 - Alibi (The winner of the Golden Eagle Award for 2023 in the nominations "Best TV Series" and "Best Actor in a TV Series" - Evgeny Stychkin)
- 2019 - Sherlock Holmes in Russia
- 2022 — Silver Spoon
- 2022 — Port
- 2022 — Negotiator
- 2023 — Fandorin. Azazel
- 2023 — Contact 2
- 2023 — Kalimba
- 2024 — Atom

==== Screenwriter ====
- 1997 - One Day Older (short film)
- 2001 - Sanzhyra (short film)
- 2005 - The Wedding Chest (feature film)
