= International Confederation of Art Cinemas =

The International Confederation of Arthouse Cinemas (CICAE, from French Confédération Internationale des Cinémas d’Art et d’Essai) is an international non-profit association with address of record in Paris which tries to support and to promote art cinema. It is the only international art cinema organisation of its kind.

== History ==
CICAE was founded in 1956 by the national art house cinema associations of Germany, France, the Netherlands and Switzerland as an international lobby or pressure-group in order to support the art cinema sector and to protect the cinematographic diversity against the supremacy of so-called commercial filmmaking. Since then it unites about 3000 independent as well as already nationally associated art house cinemas, 15 festivals and a certain number of film distributors from approximately 30 countries from all over the world in an international umbrella association. Detlef Rossmann, member of the German art house cinema association AG Kino - Gilde deutscher Filmkunstkinos e.V., officiated as CICAE's president from 2002 to 2019. Since May 2019, the new CICAE president is Christian Bräuer, who is also the president of AG Kino - Gilde deutscher Filmkunstkinos e.V..

The Art Cinema Award is awarded eleven times a year to art house films at certain cooperating festivals such as the Directors' Fortnight in Cannes, Panorama and Berlin International Film Festival in Berlin and the Sarajevo Film Festival.

The organisation also organizes a training workshop for art house cinema exhibitors and managers with the support of the Creative Europe MEDIA Programme.
