= The Light Thief =

The Light Thief (Svet-Ake)
- US film poster
- Directed by: Aktan Arym Kubat
- Written by: Aktan Arym Kubat
- Produced by: Altynai Koichumanova; Cedomir Kolar; Thanassis Karathanos; MarcBaschet; Karl Baumgartner; Denis Vaslin
- Starring: Aktan Arym Kubat; Taalaikan Abazova; Askat Sulaimanov
- Cinematography: Hassan Kydyraliyev
- Release date: May 15, 2010 (Cannes)
- Running time: 80 minutes
- Country: Kyrgyzstan
- Language: Kyrgyz

The Light Thief (Kyrgyz: Свет-аке, Svet-Ake) is a 2010 Kyrgyzstani drama film directed by Aktan Arym Kubat. The film was Kyrgyzstan's submission for Best Foreign Language Film for the 83rd Academy Awards, but did not make the final shortlist.

== Cast ==
- Aktan Arym Kubat as Svet-Ake
- Taalaikan Abazova as Bermet
- Askat Sulaimanov as Bekzat
- Asan Amanov as Esen
- Stanbek Toichubaev as Mansur

== Plot ==
Our main character Svet-Ake, or Mr. Light, is the local electrician in an extremely impoverished, underfunded Kyrgyz town. He tries his best to be the man of the people who, in a robin hood fashion, manipulates the electric meters for those who cannot afford to pay for their electricity. Even with this, he sees that more and more townspeople are leaving the town in search of better jobs, threatening the town's tradition and way of life.

Svet-Ake is a humble and humorous man, however, this may be his undoing. When Bezkat, a businessman, comes to Svet-Ake's town, he promises to fund Svet-ake's windmills and modernize the valleys if he works for him. However, Bezkat is corrupt and tries to manipulate the local government and becomes the mayor. Svet-Ake soon realizes that Bezkat's work is destroying the very land and tradition he so dearly wanted to protect.

== Corruption in the Movie ==
- Bekzat names Mansur the mayor without any voting at all.
- The windmills are tied up. If they were freed, everyone could have had electricity and the village would flourish
- Protests against the presidency with red flags.
- Political Opposition Silenced: when Svet was beaten as he tried to speak out against the corruption.

== Reviews ==
“The Light Thief might be a simple story, but it's ultimately a complex film” –Montreal Gazette

“With a burning subject such as energy control high on the world’s priority list, this is a surefire festival item, with definite chances for niche art house distribution.” –[./Http://www.screendaily.com/reviews/latest-reviews/the-light-thief-svet-ake/5016911.article Screen Daily]

== Awards ==
- Locarno International Film Festival - Piazza Grande
- Toronto International Film Festival - Contemporary World Cinema
- Cannes Film Festival - Directors' Fortnight
- Eurasia International Film Festival - FIPRESCI Prize
