= Heavenly Nomadic =

2015 film

- Film poster
- Directed by: Mirlan Abdykalykov
- Written by: Ernest Abdyjaparov; Aktan Arym Kubat
- Starring: Taalaikan Abazova
- Release date: 4 July 2015 (Karlovy)
- Running time: 81 minutes
- Country: Kyrgyzstan
- Language: Kyrgyz

Heavenly Nomadic (Kyrgyz: Сутак — Sutak) is a 2015 Kyrgyzstani drama film directed by Mirlan Abdykalykov. The film was selected as the Kyrgyzstani entry for the Best Foreign Language Film at the 88th Academy Awards but it was not nominated.

== Cast ==
- Taalaikan Abazova as Shaiyr
- Tabyldy Aktanov as Tabyldy
- Jibek Baktybekova as Umsunai
- Jenish Kangeldiev as Ermek
- Anar Nazarkulova as Karachach
- Myrza Subanbekov as Ulan

== See also ==
- List of submissions to the 88th Academy Awards for Best Foreign Language Film
- List of Kyrgyzstani submissions for the Academy Award for Best International Feature Film
