= Kyrgyzfilm =

Film studio in Kyrgysztan

- Company type: Corporation
- Industry: Motion pictures Animated films
- Founded: 1941
- Headquarters: Bishkek, Kyrgyzstan
- Products: Motion pictures Television programs

Kyrgyzfilm (Kyrgyz: Кыргызфильм, Kırgızfilm; Russian: Кыргызфильм) is the largest and oldest film studio in Kyrgyzstan. It was established on November 17, 1941.The studio produces films in both Russian and Kyrgyz.

The studio is based in Bishkek, Kyrgyzstan.

== See also ==
- Cinema of Kyrgyzstan
