= 62nd Venice International Film Festival =

2005 Italian film festival

- Festival poster
- Opening film: Seven Swords
- Closing film: Perhaps Love
- Location: Venice, Italy
- Founded: 1932
- Awards: Golden Lion: Brokeback Mountain
- Hosted by: Inés Sastre
- Artistic director: Marco Müller
- Festival date: 31 August – 10 September 2005
- Website: Website

Venice Film Festival chronology
- 63rd 61st

The 62nd annual Venice International Film Festival, was held from 31 August 2005 to 10 September 2005, at Venice Lido in Italy.

Italian production and costume designer Dante Ferretti was the jury president for the main competition. Spanish actress Inés Sastre hosted the opening and closing nights of the festival. The Golden Lion was awarded to Ang Lee's Brokeback Mountain.

Japanese filmmaker Hayao Miyazaki and Italian actress Stefania Sandrelli the recipients of the Golden Lion for Lifetime Achievement.

Digital films competed in all categories for the first time in the festival's history.

During this edition of the festival, an International Design Competition of the new Palazzo del Cinema took place. The winner of the competition was 5+1 & Rudy Ricciotti. The purpose of the new building is to house the main headquarters of the Film Festival, as well as congresses and cultural events.

The festival opened with Seven Swords by Tsui Hark, and closed with Perhaps Love by Peter Chan.

== Juries ==
=== Main Competition (Venezia 62) ===
- Dante Ferretti, Italian production designer, art director and costume designer - Jury President
- Ah Cheng, Chinese author and screenwriter
- Claire Denis, French filmmaker
- Amos Gitai, Israeli filmmaker
- Edgar Reitz, German filmmaker and Professor of Film
- Emilíana Torrini, Icelandic singer, songwriter and actress
- Christine Vachon, American producer active in independent film sector

=== Horizons (Orizzonti) ===
- Mimmo Rotella, Italian artist, closely related to cinema - Jury President
- Isabel Coixet, Spanish filmmaker
- Jean-Michel Frodon, French film critic
- Valerio Mastandrea, Italian actor
- Shinya Tsukamoto, Japanese director and actor

=== Short Film Competition (Corto Cortissimo) ===
- Chema Prado, Spanish film critic - Jury President
- Giovanna Gagliardo, Italian filmmaker
- Clemens Klopfenstein, Swiss film director

=== Opera Prima ("Luigi de Laurentiis" Award for a Debut Film) ===
In a contest that examines all feature-length films that are first works present in the various sections of the Festival, this jury assigns the "Lion of the Future - Luigi De Laurentis award for best debut work" to one film, as well as a prize of Euro 100,000 put forward by Filmauro and of 20,000 metres of film stock offered by Kodak.

- Guy Maddin, Canadian screenwriter, director, author, cinematographer and editor - Jury President
- Peter Cowie, British film historian and author
- Isabella Ferrari, Italian actress
- Ismaël Ferroukhi, French-Moroccan film director
- Renata Litvinova, Russian actress, director and screenwriter

== Official Sections ==
=== In competition ===
The following films were selected for the main competition:

English title	Original title	Director(s)	Production country
The Beast in the Heart	La bestia nel cuore	Cristina Comencini	Italy
Brokeback Mountain		Ang Lee	United States, Canada
The Brothers Grimm		Terry Gilliam	United States, United Kingdom, Czech Republic
The Constant Gardener		Fernando Meirelles	United Kingdom, Germany, United States
The Days of Abandonment	I giorni dell'abbandono	Roberto Faenza	Italy
Everlasting Regret	長恨歌	Stanley Kwan	Hong Kong, China
The Fatalist	O Fatalista	João Botelho	Portugal, France
Gabrielle		Patrice Chéreau	France, Italy
Garpastum	Гарпастум	Aleksey German Jr	Russia
Good Night, and Good Luck		George Clooney	United States
Heading South	Vers le sud	Laurent Cantet	France, Canada
Lady Vengeance	친절한 금자씨	Park Chan-wook	South Korea
Magic Mirror	Espelho Magico	Manoel de Oliveira	Portugal
Mary		Abel Ferrara	Italy, France, United States
Persona Non Grata		Krzysztof Zanussi	Poland, Italy, Russia, France
Proof		John Madden	United States
Regular Lovers	Les amants réguliers	Philippe Garrel	France
Romance and Cigarettes		John Turturro	United States
The Second Wedding Night	La seconda notte di nozze	Pupi Avati	Italy
Takeshis'		Takeshi Kitano	Japan

=== Out of Competition ===
The following films were selected to be screened out of competition:

English title	Original title	Director(s)	Production country
All the Invisible Children		Mehdi Charef, Emir Kusturica, Spike Lee, Kátia Lund, Jordan Scott, Ridley Scott, Stefano Veneruso, John Woo	Italy
Backstage		Emmanuelle Bercot	France
Bubble		Steven Soderbergh	United States
Casanova		Lasse Hallström	United States
Cinderella Man		Ron Howard	United States
Corpse Bride		Tim Burton, Mike Johnson	United Kingdom
The Descent		Neil Marshall	United Kingdom
Edmond		Stuart Gordon	United States
Elizabethtown		Cameron Crowe	United States
The Exorcism of Emily Rose		Scott Derrickson	United States
Final Fantasy VII: Advent Children	ファイナルファンタジーVII アドベントチルドレン	Tetsuya Nomura	Japan
The Fine Art of Love		John Irvin	Italy, Czech Republic, United Kingdom
Four Brothers		John Singleton	United States
Fragile	Frágiles	Jaume Balagueró	Spain
The Great Yokai War	妖怪大戦争	Takashi Miike	Japan
Initial D	頭文字D	Andrew Lau, Alan Mak	Hong Kong
Le Parfum de la dame en noir		Bruno Podalydes	France
Perhaps Love (closing film)	如果·愛	Peter Ho-sun Chan	China, Hong Kong
Seven Swords (opening film)	七劍	Tsui Hark	China, Hong Kong
Special Event: Golden Lion for Lifetime Achievement to Hayao Miyazaki
Nausicaä of the Valley of the Wind (1984)	風の谷のナウシカ	Hayao Miyazaki	Japan
Porco Rosso (1992)	紅の豚	Hayao Miyazaki	Japan
On Your Mark (1995)	ジブリ実験劇場	Hayao Miyazaki	Japan

=== Orizzonti ===
The following films were selected for the Horizons (Orizzonti) section:

English title	Original title	Director(s)	Production country
Fiction films
Árido Movie		Lirio Ferreira	Brazil
Carmen		Jean-Pierre Limosin	France
Dam Street	红颜	Li Yu	China, France
Drawing Restraint 9		Matthew Barney	United States
Everything is Illuminated		Liev Schreiber	United States
First on the Moon	Первые на Луне	Aleksei Fedorchenko	Russia
Musikanten		Franco Battiato	Italy
On the Way	Yolda	Erden Kiral	Turkey, Bulgaria
Perpetual Motion	無窮動	Ning Ying	China
Texas		Fausto Paravidino	Italy
The Wild Blue Yonder		Werner Herzog	Germany, United Kingdom, France
Documentaries
The Dignity of the Nobodies	La Dignidad de los Nadies	Fernando E. Solanas	Argentina
East of Paradise		Lech Kowalski	France
Into Great Silence	Die Große Stille	Philip Gröning	Germany
Parallel Voices	Вокальные параллели	Rustam Khamdamov	Kazakhstan
Veruschka: A Life for the Camera	Veruschka – (m)ein inszenierter Körper	Paul Morrissey, Bernd Böhm	France
Workingman's Death		Michael Glawogger	Austria, Germany
Out of Competition
The Secret Life of Words		Isabel Coixet	Spain
Special event
Kill Gil Volume 1		Gil Rossellini	Italy

=== Short Film Competition (Corto Cortissimo) ===
The following films were selected for the short films competition (Corto Cortissimo):

Title	Director(s)	Production country
In competition
113	Jason Brandenberg	Switzerland
La Apertura	Duska Zagorac	United Kingdom, Argentina
Au Petit Matin	Xavier Gens	France
Ballada	Marcell Iványi	Hungary, Belgium
Butterflies	Max Jaco	Luxembourg
A case of you	Jack Davies	United Kingdom
Come on Strange	Gabriela Gruber	Germany
Contracuerpo	Eduardo Chapero-Jackson	Spain
Da ikhos dghech chveni dghe dghegrdzeli (alt. title: Let Our Days Be Long)	Georgy Paradzanov	Russia
Flesh	Edouard Salier	France
Giorno 122	Fulvio Ottaviano	Italy
The Glass Beads	Angeles Woo	United States
Happy Birthday	Jun-won Hong	Korea
Layla Afel	Leon Prudovsky	Israel
P.E.O.Z.	Christo Petrou	Greece
A rapariga da mão morta	Alberto Seixas Santos	Portugal
Rien d'insoluble	Xavier Seron	Belgium
Small Station (Xiaozhan)	Lin Chien Ping	Taiwan
Trevirgolaottantasette	Valerio Mastandrea	Italy
Tube Poker	Simon Levene	United Kingdom
Out of competition
De Glauber para Jirges	André Ristum	Brasil
Special events: Crossings (Incroci)
La Trama di Amleto	Salvatore Chiosi	Italy
Compleanno	Sandro Dionisio	Italy
Five Minutes, Mr Welles	Vincent D'Onofrio	United States
Naufragi di Don Chisciotte	Dominick Tambasco	Italy
Special events: Between Europe and Middle East
Quelques miettes pour les oiseaux	Nassim Amaouche	Belgium, France, Jordan
De quelle couleur sont les murs de votre maison?	Timon Koulmasis	France
Diaspora	Ula Tabari	France, Belgium, Palestine
Schools of cinema: Centro Sperimentale di Cinematografia - Scuola Nazionale di Cinema:
Un posto libero	Eros Achiardi	Italy
Nature - Machini	Marco Danieli	Italy
Nature - Al buio	Fabio Mollo	Italy
Nature - Consuelo	Carlo Pisani	Italy
Schools of cinema: London Film School
Vado a messa	Ginevra Elkann	United Kingdom

=== Retrospective - The Secret History of Asian Cinema ===
This is a retrospective section on Chinese cinema (1934 to 1990) and Japanese cinema (1926 to 1978). The films are listed here in chronological order.

"The Secret History of Chinese Cinema"
English title	Original title	Year	Director(s)
The Big Road	大路	1934	Sun Yu
Plunder of Peach and Plum	桃李劫	1934	Ying Yunwei
New Women	新女性	1935	Cai Chusheng
Street Angel	馬路天使	1937	Yuan Muzhi
Crossroads	十字街頭	1937	Shen Xiling
Song at Midnight	夜半歌聲	1937	Ma-Xu Weibang
Princess Iron Fan	铁扇公主	1941	Wan Laiming, Wan Guchan
Spring in a Small Town	李天濟	1948	Fei Mu
Crows and Sparrows	烏鴉與麻雀	1949	Zheng Junli
The Adventures of Sanmao the Waif	三毛流浪記	1949	Zhao Ming, Yan Gong
This Life of Mine	我這一輩子	1950	Shi Hui
Two Stage Sisters	舞臺姐妹	1965	Xie Jin
The Valiant Ones	忠烈圖	1975	King Hu
One and Eight	一個和八個	1983	Zhang Junzhao
Mama	媽媽	1990	Zhang Yuan
"The Secret History of Japanese Cinema"
Chōkon	長恨	1926	Daisuke Itō
A Diary of Chuji's Travels	忠次旅日記	1927	Daisuke Itō
Oatsurae Jirokichi Koshi	御誂治郎吉格子	1931	Daisuke Itō
The Million Ryo Pot	丹下左膳余話 百萬両の壺	1935	Sadao Yamanaka
Priest of Darkness (aka)	河内山宗俊 / Kōchiyama Sōshun	1936	Sadao Yamanaka
Humanity and Paper Balloons	人情紙風船	1937	Sadao Yamanaka
Rivals (aka)	エノケンの頑張り戦術	1939	Nobuo Nakagawa
The 47 Ronin	元禄 忠臣蔵	1941–1942	Kenji Mizoguchi
The Famous Sword Bijomaru	名刀美女丸	1945	Kenji Mizoguchi
A Tale of Archery at the Sanjusangendo	三十三間堂通し矢物語	1945	Mikio Naruse
Princess Yang Kwei Fei	楊貴妃	1955	Kenji Mizoguchi
A Wicked Woman	毒婦高橋お伝	1958	Nobuo Nakagawa
The Ghost of Yotsuya	東海道四谷怪談	1959	Nobuo Nakagawa
Go to Hell, Hoodlums! aka Fighting Delinquents	くたばれ愚連隊	1960	Seijun Suzuki
Akumyō	悪名	1961	Tokuzō Tanaka
High Noon for Gangsters aka Villains in Broad Daylight	白昼の無頼漢	1961	Kinji Fukasaku
The Tale of Zatoichi	座頭市物語	1962	Kenji Misumi
Detective Bureau 2-3: Go to Hell Bastards!	探偵事務所23くたばれ悪党ども	1963	Seijun Suzuki
The Great Killing	大殺陣	1964	Eiichi Kudo
The Flower and the Angry Waves	花と怒濤	1964	Seijun Suzuki
On the Road Forever aka Homeless Drifter	無宿者	1964	Kenji Misumi
Tales of Chivalry in Japan	日本侠客伝	1964	Masahiro Makino
Wolves, Pigs and Men aka Wolves, Pigs and People	狼と豚と人間	1964	Kinji Fukasaku
Our Blood Will Not Forgive aka Our Blood Will Not Allow It	俺たちの血が許さない	1964	Seijun Suzuki
Fight, Zatoichi, Fight	座頭市血笑旅	1964	Kenji Misumi
Blood of Revenge	明治俠客伝 三代目襲名	1965	Tai Kato
A Solitary Knight	沓掛時次郎・遊侠一匹	1966	Tai Kato
Red Peony Gambler: Flower Cards Match	緋牡丹博徒 花札勝負	1969	Tai Kato
Japan Organized Crime Boss aka Japan's Violent Gangs - The Boss and the Killers	日本暴力団 組長	1969	Kinji Fukasaku
Red Peony Gambler: Oryu's Return	緋牡丹博徒・お竜参上	1970	Tai Kato
Sympathy for the Underdog	博徒外人部隊	1971	Kinji Fukasaku
Street Mobster	現代やくざ 人斬り与太	1972	Kinji Fukasaku
Battles Without Honor and Humanity	仁義なき戦い	1973	Kinji Fukasaku
Graveyard of Honor	仁義の墓場	1975	Kinji Fukasaku
Cops vs. Thugs	県警対組織暴力	1975	Kinji Fukasaku
Yakuza Graveyard	やくざの墓場 くちなしの花	1976	Kinji Fukasaku
Shogun's Samurai	柳生一族の陰謀	1978	Kinji Fukasaku

=== Retrospective - The Secret History of Italian Cinema 2 ===
A retrospective section on Italian film (1946 to 1976). This section is part of a planned 4-year retrospective on some lesser known sides of Italian Cinema that started on the 61st edition of the festival.

English title	Original title	Year	Director(s)
Casanova on the screen
The Mysterious Rider	Il cavaliere misterioso	1948	Riccardo Freda
Sins of Casanova	Le avventure di Giacomo Casanova	1955	Steno
Giacomo Casanova: Childhood and Adolescence	Infanzia, vocazioni, prime esperienze di Giacomo Casanova, veneziano	1969	Luigi Comencini
Fellini's Casanova	Il Casanova di Federico Fellini	1976	Federico Fellini
Homage to Fulvio Lucisano
Planet of the Vampires	Terrore nello spazio	1965	Mario Bava
Dr. Goldfoot and the Girl Bombs	Le spie vengono dal semifreddo	1966	Mario Bava
What Have You Done to Solange?	Cosa avete fatto a Solange?	1972	Massimo Dallamano
The Cursed Medallion	Il medaglione insanguinato	1975	Massimo Dallamano
Un mondo perfetto		1946–1957	Nino Pagot, Gibba
Pier Paolo Pasolini (1922–1975)
Salò, or the 120 Days of Sodom	Salò o le 120 giornate di Sodoma	1975	Pier Paolo Pasolini
Bandits of Orgosolo	Banditi a Orgosolo	1961	Vittorio De Seta

== Independent Sections ==
=== Venice International Film Critics' Week ===
The following feature films were selected to be screened as In Competition for the 20th Venice International Film Critics' Week:

English title	Original title	Director(s)	Production country
In competition
Así		Jesús-Mario Lozano	Mexico
Brick		Rian Johnson	United States
Mother Nature	Mater Natura	Massimo Andrei	Italy
The Passenger	Le Passager	Éric Caravaca	France
Pavee Lackeen: The Traveller Girl		Perry Ogden	Ireland
The Sunflowers	Kuihua Duoduo	Wang Baomin	China
Writing on the Earth	Yadasht bar zamin	Ali Mohammad Ghasemi	Iran
Special event
Belzec		Guillaume Moscovitz	France
Homage to Alberto Lattuada
Giacomo the Idealist (1943)	Giacomo l'idealista	Alberto Lattuada	Italy

=== Venice Days ===
The following films were selected for the 2nd edition of Venice Days (Giornate Degli Autori) autonomous section:

English title	Original title	Director(s)	Production country
13 Tzameti		Gela Babluani	France
Allegro		Christoffer Boe	Denmark
Waiting	Attente	Rashid Masharawi	Palestine, France
Before It Had a Name		Giada Colagrande	United States
C.R.A.Z.Y.		Jean-Marc Vallée	Canada
Craj - Domani		Davide Marengo	Italy
The Wind	El Viento	Eduardo Mignogna	Argentina, Spain
Elio Petri. Notes On A Filmmaker	Elio Petri... appunti su un autore	Federico Bacci, Stefano Leone, Nicola Guarneri	Italy
Falling... In Love	Lian ren	Wang Ming-Tai	Taiwan
Giacomo the Idealist (1943)	Giacomo l'idealista	Alberto Lattuada	Italy
La passione di Giosuè l'Ebreo		Pasquale Scimeca	Italy, Spain
The Young Lieutenant	Le petit lieutenant	Xavier Beauvois	France
Love		Vladan Nikolic	United States, Serbia and Montenegro
Man Push Cart		Ramin Bahrani	United States
Next Door	Naboer	Pål Sletaune	Norway, Sweden, Denmark
Parabola		Karim Ouelhaj	Belgium

== Official Awards ==
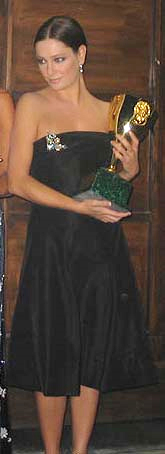
Giovanna Mezzogiorno, winner of Volpi Cup Best Actress at 62nd Venice International Film Festival

=== In Competition ===
- Golden Lion: Brokeback Mountain by Ang Lee
- Silver Lion for Best Director: Regular Lovers by Philippe Garrel
- Grand Special Jury Prize: Mary by Abel Ferrara
- Volpi Cup for Best Actor: David Strathairn for Good Night, and Good Luck
- Volpi Cup for Best Actress: Giovanna Mezzogiorno for The Beast in the Heart
- Marcello Mastroianni Award: Ménothy Cesar for Heading South
- Golden Osella for Best Cinematography: William Lubtchansky for Regular Lovers
- Golden Osella for Best Screenplay: George Clooney and Grant Heslov for Good Night, and Good Luck
- Special Lion: Isabelle Huppert

=== Orizzonti ===
- Best Film: First on the Moon by Aleksei Fedorchenko
- Best Documentary: East of Paradise by Lech Kowalski

=== Short Film Competition (Corto Cortissimo Lion) ===
- Citroen Short Super-Short Lion for Best Short Film: Small Station by Lin Chien-ping
  - Special Mention: Layla Afel by Leon Prudovsky
- UIP Prize for Best European Short Film: Butterflies by Max Jacoby

=== Lion of the Future - "Luigi de Laurentiis" Award for a Debut Film ===
- 13 Tzameti by Gela Babluani

== Independent Sections Awards ==
The following official and collateral awards were conferred to films of the autonomous sections:

=== Venice International Film Critics' Week ===
- Audience Award: Mother Nature by Massimo Andrei
- Isvema Award: Mother Nature by Massimo Andrei
- FEDIC Award: Mother Nature by Massimo Andrei

=== Venice Days (Giornate Degli Autori) ===
- Netpac Award: 13 Tzameti by Gela Babluani
- UNESCO Award: La passione di Giosué l'Ebreo by Pasquale Scimeca
- Pasinetti Awards (Venice Days): Elio Petri. Notes on a Filmmaker by Federico Bacci, Stefano Leone, Nicola Guarneri
- Label Europa Cinemas: The Young Lieutenant by Xavier Beauvois
- "Lino Miccichè" First Feature Award: Craj - Domani by Davide Marengo
- Venice Authors Prize: Love by Vladan Nikolic

== Independent Awards ==
The following collateral awards were conferred to films of the official selection:

=== FIPRESCI Award ===
- Best Film (Main competition): Good Night, and Good Luck by George Clooney
- Best Film (Horizons): The Wild Blue Yonder by Werner Herzog

=== SIGNIS Award ===
- Mary by Abel Ferrara

=== C.I.C.A.E. Award ===
- Dam Street by Li Yu (Horizons)

=== UNICEF Award ===
- The Beast in the Heart by Cristina Comencini

=== Pasinetti Awards ===
- Best Film (Main competition): Good Night, and Good Luck by George Clooney
- Best Film (Horizons): Texas by Fausto Paravidino

=== Little Golden Lion ===
- Lady Vengeance by Park Chan-wook

=== Jameson Short Film Award ===
- Aria by Claudio Noce

=== Young Cinema Award ===
- Alternatives: Lady Vengeance by Park Chan-wook
- Best International Film: The Constant Gardener by Fernando Meirelles
- Best Italian Film: The Beast in the Heart by Cristina Comencini

=== Wella Prize ===
- The Beast in the Heart by Cristina Comencini

=== Open Prize ===
- Everlasting Regret by Stanley Kwan

=== Doc/It Award ===
- East of Paradise by Lech Kowalski
- The Dignity of the Nobodies by Fernando Solanas

=== Lina Mangiacapre Award ===
- The Secret Life of Words by Isabel Coixet

=== Future Film Festival Digital Award ===
- Corpse Bride by Tim Burton and Mike Johnson

=== Laterna Magica Prize ===
- Everything Is Illuminated by Liev Schreiber

=== Sergio Trasatti Award ===
- Mary by Abel Ferrara

=== Biografilm Award ===
- Everything Is Illuminated by Liev Schreiber

=== 'CinemAvvenire' Award ===
- Best Film in Competition: Lady Vengeance by Park Chan-wook
- Cinema for Peace: Heading South by Laurent Cantet

=== Award of the City of Rome ===
- The Beast in the Heart by Cristina Comencini
- The Dignity of the Nobodies by Fernando Solanas (Horizons)

=== Human Rights Film Network Award ===
- The Dignity of the Nobodies by Fernando Solanas
  - Special mention: Good Night, and Good Luck by George Clooney

=== EIUC Award ===
- Giulio Manfredonia, Giobbe Covatta

=== Mimmo Rotella Foundation Award ===
- Mary by Abel Ferrara
