= Love (2005 film) =

2005 film by Vladan Nikolic

- Promotional poster
- Directed by: Vladan Nikolic
- Written by: Vladan Nikolic
- Produced by: Jim Stark
- Starring: Sergej Trifunović; Geno Lechner; Peter Gevisser; Didier Flamand
- Cinematography: Vladimir Subotić
- Edited by: Vladan Nikolic
- Music by: Standing in Lines
- Distributed by: Forward Entertainment LLC
- Release date: April 21, 2005
- Running time: 93 minutes
- Countries: United States; Serbia and Montenegro
- Language: English
- Budget: $350,000

Love is a 2005 independent feature film, written, directed and edited by Vladan Nikolic, produced by Jim Stark (Down by Law, Night on Earth, Factotum) and executive produced by Christoph Thoke (Tropical Malady). The film was made in New York City for $350,000, with a cast and crew from over 20 countries, with 168 scenes, shot at over 60 locations. The film was shot on mini DV in 20 days, transferred to 35mm film, and received high praise in the September 2005 issue of American Cinematographer for its stylish look.

It impressed audiences and critics at the 2005 Tribeca Film Festival, Venice Film Festival, and the Oldenburg Film Festival. Love also won the Prix De Jeunes at the Cinéma Tout Ecran festival in Geneva, Switzerland. Critics compared the film to Pulp Fiction, Memento, Rashomon, and in its political subtext to Marathon Man and Dirty Pretty Things (Variety).

Told through a non-linear narrative from each of the characters' points of view, the film reconstructs the stories of a Yugoslav hit man (Sergej Trifunovic), his former lover (Geno Lechner), and her police officer boyfriend (Peter Gevisser), as their paths cross in New York.

== Cast ==
- Sergej Trifunovic as Vanya
- Geno Lechner as Anna
- Peter Gevisser as Dirk
- Didier Flamand as Jean
- Mario Padula as Manny
- Al Nazemian as Ali (as Al Naz)
- Liat Glick as Faye
- Eric Frandsen as Hayes
- Mariano Mederos as Rivera
