= Everything That Will Happen Has Already Happened =

- Directed by: Vladan Nikolic
- Story by: Vladan Nikolic
- Produced by: Anthony Argento; Julie Deffet; Vladan Nikolic; Shireen Khaled; Christoph Thoke; Matthew Wachsman; Eric Werthman
- Starring: Austin Chick; Didier Flamand; Agnes Artych; Henry Watkins
- Cinematography: Orfeas Skutelis
- Edited by: Vladan Nikolic
- Music by: Susann Offenmüller
- Production company: Surla Films
- Release date: November 14, 2024 (Tallinn Black Nights Film Festival)
- Running time: 95 minutes
- Country: United States
- Languages: English, French, Spanish, Mandarin

Everything That Will Happen Has Already Happened is a 2024 independent feature film written, directed and edited by Vladan Nikolic. The film consists of a series of interconnected short films created by filmmakers from various countries around the world, including Lebanon, Belgium, Venezuela, Ukraine, and Pakistan. The short films explore societal turmoil, blending personal and global challenges while addressing themes of time, identity and the human experience in a post-pandemic world. The main plot is presented in black and white, while the individual short films are shown in color, creating a visual contrast.

== Plot ==
Alice, a university student from Eastern Europe, travels to New York City to work on her dissertation, which consists of a series of short films. She stays in a friend’s apartment, but when her internet connection goes out, she encounters a man on the building’s rooftop who appears to be contemplating suicide. He explains that he often stands on ledges of rooftops to feel alive, but he never reveals his real name, using different identities instead. As Alice and the man engage in intellectual discussions about current events, life, the past and the future, they develop a deep connection and fall for each other. They visit locations around New York, including the World’s Fair in Queens, while continuing their philosophical conversations. In the end, Alice leaves New York but decides to return, ultimately moving to the city after the man reveals his name.

== Production ==
The film was produced on a no-budget basis, with Nikolic forming a co-op with key filmmakers. Supported by a small benefactor, the project came to life through service deals and global collaboration. Filmmakers from around the world contributed short films that aligned with the central theme while maintaining creative control over their respective shorts. The New York portion was shot in one week with three Red cameras. The global shorts were contributed over time, some shot with small crews, others evolving into larger productions.

== Release ==
The film had its world premiere at the 2024 Tallinn Black Nights Film Festival in Tallinn, Estonia. The film also premiered at Lakedance Film Festival in Palić, Serbia.

== Cast ==
- Didier Flamand as The Actor
- Austin Chick as The Director
- Agnes Artych as Alice
- Henry Watkins as Jake

== See also ==
- List of French-language films
- List of Mandarin-language films
