= Baggage Battles =

- Starring: William Leroy; Mark Meyer; Valérie-Jeanne Mathieu; Laurence Martin; Sally Martin
- Narrated by: Jake Kaplan
- Country of origin: Canada
- Original language: English
- No. of seasons: 5
- No. of episodes: 65

Original release
- Network: Travel Channel
- Release: April 11, 2012 – March 17, 2016

Baggage Battles is an American docu-reality series produced by The Travel Channel from 2012 until 2016. The first episode of the show was aired on April 11, 2012. Season 5 was produced in Canada for Travel Channel International and Canada's CMT Network.

Laurence and Sally Martin are also recurring appraisers on Storage Wars. William Leroy appeared once in Toy Hunter and Jordan Hembrough appeared three times on "Baggage Battles".

A spin-off focussing on William Leroy "Billy Buys Brooklyn", aired its first 20 episodes in 2021. Mark Meyer made an appearance in the first season.

== Format ==
The program is related to lost baggage auctions, police auctions, and estate auctions. Season 5 features professional buyers Billy Leroy (an antique expert and dealer) who owned the famous Billy's Antiques on the Bowery in New York City, Val (a production designer and online store owner) and Mark Meyer (an eCommerce expert) traveling around North America searching for amazing finds to resell. Previous seasons of the series featured other buyers such as Laurence and Sally Martin, and Traci Lombardo. They often call experts/appraisers to evaluate the objects they have bought. Leroy started filming his new series Billy Buys Brooklyn on August 6, 2020, for Discovery channel. It premiered on Discovery plus in the UK on June 16, 2021.

== Seasons ==
=== Season 1 ===
Total #	Episode #	Title	Location	Original release date
1	101	"Miami"	Miami, Florida	April 11, 2012
2	102	"London"	London, England	April 11, 2012
3	103	"Indianapolis"	Indianapolis, Indiana	April 18, 2012
4	104	"Atlanta"	Atlanta, Georgia	April 25, 2012
5	105	"New Jersey"	New Jersey	May 2, 2012
6	106	"Los Angeles"	Los Angeles, California	May 9, 2012
7	107	"Scotland"	Glasgow, Scotland	May 30, 2012
8	108	"Florida"	Miami, Florida	June 6, 2012
9	109	"Vancouver"	Vancouver, British Columbia	June 27, 2012
10	110	"NY Port Authority"	New York, New York	July 11, 2012
11	111	"Toronto"	Toronto, Ontario	July 18, 2012
12	112	"North Carolina"	Archdale, North Carolina	July 25, 2012

=== Season 2 ===
Total #	Episode #	Title	Location	Original release date
13	201	"Diamonds in the Rough"	Brooklyn, New York	November 14, 2012
14	202	"Blast From the Past"	Middleboro, Massachusetts	November 14, 2012
15	203	"Breaking the Bank"	Atlanta, Georgia	November 21, 2012
16	204	"Man On Fire"	Greensboro, North Carolina	November 28, 2012
17	205	"Cash Is King"	London, England	December 5, 2012
18	206	"Knightwalkers"	Dublin, Ireland	December 12, 2012
19	207	"Boy Toys"	Greensboro, North Carolina	December 19, 2012
20	208	"Crate Expectations"	Phoenix, Arizona	January 9, 2013
21	209	"Grand Theft Auto"	Tampa, Florida	January 16, 2013
22	210	"California Scheming"	Santa Cruz, California	January 23, 2013
23	211	"Eye For an Eye"	Toronto, Ontario	February 6, 2013
24	212	"Liar Liar"	Shreveport, Louisiana	February 13, 2013
25	213	"Daredevils"	Toronto, Ontario	February 20, 2013
26	214	"Shock and Awe"	Louisiana	February 27, 2013

=== Season 3 ===
Total #	Episode #	Title	Location	Original release date
27	301	"Guns A-Blazin'"	Stockton, California	October 15, 2013
28	302	"Mike Tyson's Punch Out"	Jacksonville, Florida	October 15, 2013
29	303	"Bunny Money"	Denver, Colorado	October 22, 2013
30	304	"Golden Ticket"	Nashville, Tennessee	October 29, 2013
31	305	"Blow Up"	Tucson, Arizona	November 5, 2013
32	306	"Platinum Hits"	New York, New York	November 12, 2013
33	307	"Sin City Win"	Las Vegas, Nevada	November 19, 2013
34	308	"World War Score"	Normandy, France	November 26, 2013
35	309	"Two Faced"	Stockton, California	December 3, 2013
36	310	"Bad Blood"	Red Hook, New York	December 10, 2013
37	311	"What a Dummy"	Stockton, California	December 17, 2013
38	312	"Lady Luck"	St. Paul, Minnesota	January 7, 2014
39	313	"Space Case"	Sacramento, California	January 7, 2014

=== Season 4 ===
Total #	Episode #	Title	Location	Original release date
40	401	"Steal Drum"	Nashville, Tennessee	April 23, 2014
41	402	"Monster Money"	Hollywood, California	April 23, 2014
42	403	"Intergalactic Bounty"	Nashville, Tennessee	April 30, 2014
43	404	"Big Boy Bucks"	Las Vegas, Nevada	April 30, 2014
44	405	"Safari Sale"	Johannesburg, South Africa	May 7, 2014
45	406	"Inflated Egos"	Commerce, Georgia	May 7, 2014
46	407	"Walk the Plank"	Orlando, Florida	May 14, 2014
47	408	"Gunning For Dollars"	Las Vegas, Nevada	May 21, 2014
48	409	"Swami Says"	Austin, Texas	May 28, 2014
49	410	"It's Not Easy Making Green"	Allentown, Pennsylvania	June 4, 2014
50	411	"Dino-Mite"	Knoxville, Tennessee	June 11, 2014
51	412	"Greedy Pig"	Alpharetta, Georgia	June 18, 2014
52	413	"The Wizard of Odd"	Toronto, Ontario	June 18, 2014

=== Season 5 ===
Total #	Episode #	Title	Location	Original release date
53	501	"Prohibitive Costs"	Huntingdon, Quebec	November 18, 2015
54	502	"Formula for Success"	Montreal, Quebec	November 18, 2015
55	503	"Auction Prayers"	Quebec City, Quebec	November 18, 2015
56	504	"Titanic Deals!"	Halifax, Nova Scotia	November 18, 2015
57	505	"Burial Expenses"	Providence, Rhode Island	December 3, 2015
58	506	"Once a Pawn a Time"	Tampa, Florida	March 14, 2016
59	507	"Oils Well That Ends Well"	Edmonton, Alberta	March 14, 2016
60	508	"Live Free or Buy"	Concord, New Hampshire	March 15, 2016
61	509	"Blast From The Past"	Los Angeles, California	March 15, 2016
62	510	"Hometown Hero"	Long Island, New York	March 16, 2016
63	511	"Un-Beliebable Bargains"	Toronto, Ontario	March 16, 2016
64	512	"Capital Gains"	Ottawa, Ontario	March 17, 2016
65	513	"Disco Deals"	New York, New York	March 17, 2016

== Critical reaction ==
The show is well received by the critics. It has received 7.4/10 ratings on TV.com and has received 2.3/10 ratings on TVGuide.co.uk. AV Club found it derivative of Storage Wars, but more positively said that the travel angle did add some local color and occasionally it did surprise with what the participants found.

== International distribution ==
- Albania: On Travel Channel Albania HD
- Australia: On A&E Australia and 7mate
- Brazil: On Travel & Living Channel
- Bulgaria : On Travel Channel Bulgaria and Discovery Channel Bulgaria
- Canada: OLN, DTour, CMT Canada
- Croatia: On Discovery Channel Croatia
- France: On Discovery Channel France
- Germany: On DMAX Germany and TLC Germany
- Hong Kong: On Lifetime (South East Asia), under the name "行李大戰(Baggage Wars)"
- India: On History TV18
- Italy: On DMAX Italia and Fine Living, under the name Affari in valigia
- Ireland: on Travel Channel Ireland and Discovery Channel Ireland
- Taiwan: On Travel Channel HD (Asia), under the name "行李戰爭(Baggage Wars)"
- Malaysia: On Lifetime Channel
- Malta: On Discovery Channel Malta and Travel Channel Malta
- Norway: On Discovery Channel Norway
- Poland: On Discovery Channel Poland, under the name Walka o Bagaż.
- Serbia: On Travel Channel Serbia
- Spain: On Discovery Channel Spain under the name "Perdido, Vendido"
- Sweden: On Discovery Channel Sweden
- Switzerland: On SRF zwei
- The Netherlands: On Discovery Channel Netherlands
- United Kingdom: On Travel Channel UK and Discovery Channel UK
