= Bourek (film) =

- Directed by: Vladan Nikolic
- Written by: Vladan Nikolic
- Produced by: Mario Piperides; Vladan Nikolic; Katerina Misichroni; Vladimir Subotic
- Starring: William Leroy; Katerina Misichroni; Robert Rees; Marios Iannou
- Cinematography: Vladimir Subotic
- Edited by: Vladan Nikolic
- Music by: Theodore
- Production companies: Surla Films; AMP Filmworks
- Distributed by: CINEMAflix
- Release dates: 29 September 2015 (Athens Film Festival); 29 April 2016 (US)
- Running time: 88 minutes
- Countries: Cyprus; United States; Greece; Serbia
- Languages: English; Greek; Serbian

Bourek is a 2015 American-Cypriot comedy film directed by Vladan Nikolic, starring William Leroy, Katerina Misichroni, Robert Rees and Marios Iannou.

== Cast ==
- William Leroy as W.C. Rupperts
- Katerina Misichroni as Eleni
- Robert Rees as Cal
- Marios Iannou as Adem
- Sergej Trifunović as Mirko
- Branislav Trifunović as Slavko
- Paul Sevigny as Pastor

== Release ==
The film was released in the United States on 29 April 2016.

== Reception ==
Jeannette Catsoulis of The New York Times called the acting "fair-to-middling" and the plot "enervated" while praising the cinematography.

Robert Abele of the Los Angeles Times wrote that while the film is "well-meaning", it is "woefully lacking in dimension or urgency", and called it the "movie equivalent of a scenic tourist trap".

The Hollywood Reporter wrote that the film "cross-cultural good vibes and occasional food porn do little to spice up the picture’s limp jokes and reheated hijinks".
