= Didier Flamand =

French actor (born 1947)

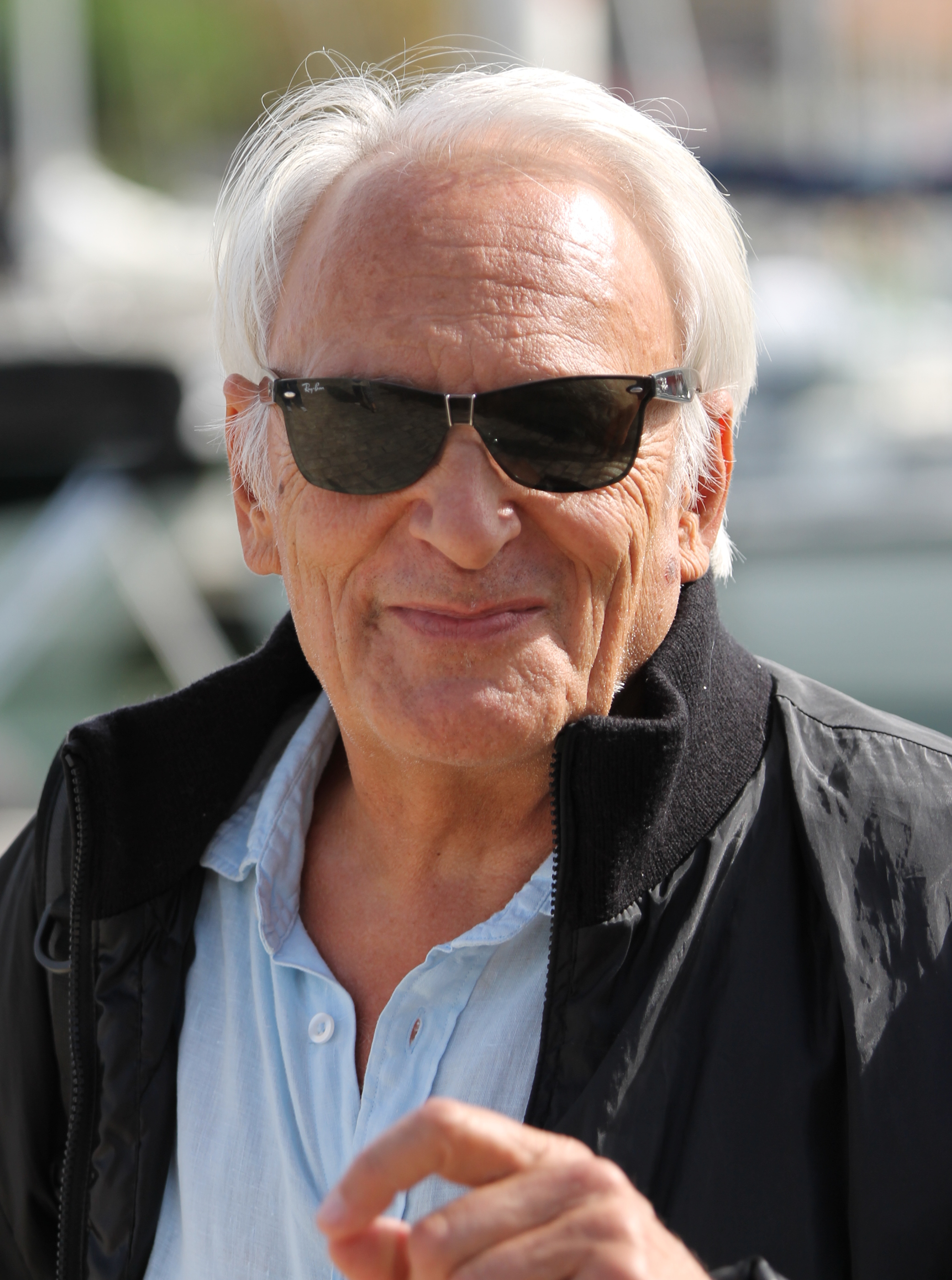
- Born: 12 March 1947 (age 79); Boulogne-Billancourt, France
- Occupations: Actor; Theatre director
- Years active: 1973–present

Didier Flamand (French: [didje flamɑ̃]; born 12 March 1947) is a French actor and theatre director. He has appeared in more than 200 films and television shows since 1973. He starred in Raúl Ruiz's 1978 film The Suspended Vocation.

== Theater ==
Year	Title	Author	Director	Notes
1977	Prends bien garde aux zeppelins	Didier Flamand	Didier Flamand	
1977	La Colline	Colins	Didier Flamand	Théâtre des Bouffes du Nord
1978	Ecce Homo ?	Didier Flamand	Didier Flamand	
1980	Prometheus Bound	Aeschylus	André Engel	National Theatre of Strasbourg
1981	Prends bien garde aux zeppelins	Didier Flamand	Didier Flamand	
1982	Société 1	Didier Flamand	Didier Flamand	
1983	La Manufacture	Didier Flamand	Didier Flamand	
1983	Le cadeau de l'empereur	Giovanna Marini	Didier Flamand	
1985-86	La Nuit d'Irlande	Bruno Bayen	Hélène Vincent	Festival d'Avignon
1987	Allez hop !	Pascal Rambert	Pascal Rambert	
1988	Des sentiments soudains	Jean-Louis Livi	Jean Bouchaud	
1989	Le Chemin solitaire	Arthur Schnitzler	Luc Bondy	
2000	The Lady of the Camellias	Alexandre Dumas	Alfredo Arias	Théâtre Marigny
2002	Prends bien garde aux zeppelins	Didier Flamand	Didier Flamand	Théâtre national de Chaillot
2002	La Grande Roue	Václav Havel	Marcel Bozonnet	Festival d'Avignon
2005	Sous le ciel de Quichotte	Jean-Claude Carrière & Dorothée Zumstein	Romain Bonnin	
2006	Manon Lescaut	Giacomo Puccini	Didier Flamand	
2009	Le Démon de Hannah	Antoine Rault	Michel Fagadau	Théâtre des Champs-Élysées
2012	The Lady from the Sea	Henrik Ibsen	Claude Baqué	Théâtre des Bouffes du Nord
2013	Nos femmes	Éric Assous	Richard Berry	Théâtre de Paris

== Filmography ==
=== Actor ===
Year	Title	Role	Director	Notes
1973	George Who?	Juste Ollivier	Michèle Rosier	
1973	Bel ordure	A Server	Jean Marboeuf	
1974	The Phantom of Liberty	The Secretary	Luis Buñuel	
1974	La confession d'un enfant du siècle	Valentin	Claude Santelli	TV movie
1974	Les Faucheurs de marguerites	Hubert Latham	Marcel Camus	TV mini-series
1974	Le pain noir	The Godfather	Serge Moati	TV mini-series
1975	India Song	The Young Guest	Marguerite Duras	
1975	Tous les jours de la vie	Leclerc	Maurice Frydland	TV movie
1976	Enfin	The Man	Daniel Jouanisson	Short
1977	Animal	The Cousin	Claude Zidi	
1977	Les dossiers de l'écran	Antoine	Robert Enrico	TV series (1 episode)
1978	The Suspended Vocation	Jérôme	Raúl Ruiz	
1978	Poker menteuses et révolver matin	Didier	Christine van de Putte	
1978	De mémoire d'homme	Von Rath	Maurice Frydland	TV series (1 episode)
1979	Mais ou et donc Ornicar	Philippe	Bertrand Van Effenterre	
1979	Le pull-over rouge	Jean Garnier	Michel Drach	
1980	Mont-Oriol	Gontrand de Ravenel	Serge Moati	TV movie
1980	Le taciturne	The young man	Jacques Floran	TV movie
1980	Simon, la royauté du vent	Simon	Paul Planchon	TV movie
1980	L'enfant dans le corridor	Pierre	Jacques Tréfouel	TV movie
1981	Un assassin qui passe	Edouard	Michel Vianey	
1981	La revanche	The Editor	Pierre Lary	
1982	La petite fille dans un paysage bleu	Father	Bernard Gesbert	TV movie
1982	Un moment de bonheur	Marc	Yves Laumet	TV movie
1982	Paris-Saint-Lazare	Monsieur Belleau	Marco Pico	TV mini-series
1982	Cinéma 16	Bernard	Colette Djidou	TV series (1 episode)
1983	Ballade à blanc	Maurice Talmain	Bertrand Gauthier	
1983	Le bâtard	Jean Triol	Bertrand Van Effenterre	
1983	Stella	Xavier	Laurent Heynemann	
1984	Ne quittez pas	The Fireman	Sophie Schmit	Short
1984	Yalta	Eden	Yves-André Hubert	TV movie
1984	Un seul être vous manque	Guillaume	Jacques Doniol-Valcroze	TV series
1985	Blanche et Marie	Orion	Jacques Renard	
1985	Le deuxième couteau	Yan Brique	Josée Dayan	TV movie
1985	Colette	Henri De Jouvenel	Gérard Poitou-Weber	TV mini-series
1985	Messieurs les jurés	Monsieur Ferrière	Gérard Gozlan	TV series (1 episode)
1986	My Brother-in-Law Killed My Sister	The journalist	Jacques Rouffio	
1986	Le complexe du kangourou	Jacques Kurland	Pierre Jolivet	
1986	Faire la fête	The man	Anne-Marie Miéville	Short
1987	Wings of Desire	The Angel	Wim Wenders	
1987	La Rusa	Juan Altamirano	Mario Camus	
1987	Monsieur Benjamin	Maurice	Marie-Hélène Rebois	TV movie
1987	Opération Ypsilon	Lebeau	Peter Kassovitz	TV movie
1988	Chocolat	Captain Védrine	Claire Denis	
1988	Le cabinet noir des pâles amours	The Man	Catherine Tissier-Ventura	Short
1988	Le chevalier de Pardaillan	The Duke of Guise	Josée Dayan	TV series
1989	The Hostage of Europe	General Bertrand	Jerzy Kawalerowicz	
1989	Blancs cassés	François	Philippe Venault	
1989	Erreur de jeunesse	Patrick	Radovan Tadic	
1989	Navarro	Trotsky	Patrick Jamain	TV series (1 episode)
1989	Le retour d'Arsène Lupin	The Baron Suares	Philippe Condroyer	TV series (1 episode)
1990	Le bal du gouverneur	Charles Forestier	Marie-France Pisier	
1990	Un jeu d'enfant	Georges	Pascal Kané	
1990	Le chemin solitaire	Professor Wegrat	Luc Bondy	TV movie
1990	Blaues Blut	Jean Merant	Robert Young	TV mini-series
1990	Bordertown	Emile Chabrolet	Daniel Moosmann	TV series (1 episode)
1991	Iran : Days of Crisis	Sadegh Ghotbzadeh	Kevin Connor	TV movie
1991	Red Fox	Paul de Vigny	Ian Toynton	TV movie in 2 parts
1992	La Crise	Monsieur Laville	Coline Serreau	
1992	Krapatchouk	Lagachis	Enrique Gabriel	
1992	Blanc d'ébène	Lieutenant Joubert	Cheik Doukouré	
1992	Les années campagne	The Father	Philippe Leriche	
1992	La femme de l'amant	Jean-Paul	Christopher Frank	TV movie
1992	Une maman dans la ville	Garcin	Miguel Courtois	TV movie
1992	L'arbre de la discorde	Bernard	François Rossini	TV movie
1992	Warburg : A Man of Influence	Grunfeld	Moshé Mizrahi	TV mini-series
1992	Le Lyonnais	Danremond	Michel Favart	TV series (1 episode)
1993	Rupture(s)	Man with the Dog	Christine Citti	
1993	Meurtre en ut majeur	Walter Malvern	Michel Boisrond	TV movie
1993	Pris au piège	Commissioner Anjubault	Michel Favart	TV movie
1993	L'interdiction	The Minister of Justice	Jean-Daniel Verhaeghe	TV movie
1993	Les marchands du silence	Michel	François Labonté	TV movie
1994	I Can't Sleep	The Detective	Claire Denis	
1994	Vengeances	Commissioner Mathieu	Miguel Courtois	TV movie
1994	Un alibi en or	Lawyer Costang	Michèle Ferrand-Lafaye	TV movie
1994	Julie Lescaut	Vincent	Josée Dayan	TV series (1 episode)
1995	L'année Juliette	Brett	Philippe Le Guay	
1995	To Have (or Not)	Personnel Officer	Laetitia Masson	
1995	Danse avec la vie	Philippe	Michel Favart	TV movie
1996	La Belle Verte	Politician	Coline Serreau	
1996	Sortez des rangs	The Captain	Jean-Denis Robert	
1996	L'insoumise	Jourdain	Nadine Trintignant	TV movie
1996	J'ai rendez-vous avec vous	David	Laurent Heynemann	TV movie
1996	Maigret	Doctor Vernoux	Claude Goretta & Christian Karcher	TV series (1 episode)
1997	Elles	Edgar	Luís Galvão Teles	
1997	Babiole	The Speech Therapist	Bruno Daniault	Short
1997	Viens jouer dans la cour des grands	Villeneuve	Caroline Huppert	TV movie
1997	Somnia ou le voyage en hypnopompia	Voice	Hélène Guétary	TV movie
1997	Des gens si bien élevés	Pierre	Alain Nahum	TV movie
1997	Hors limites	The French Consul	Dennis Berry	TV series (1 episode)
1998	Ça ne se refuse pas	Marcus	Eric Woreth	
1998	Un père en plus	Hubert	Didier Albert	TV movie
1998	Une femme à suivre	Jacques	Patrick Dewolf	TV movie
1999	Quasimodo d'El Paris	The Governor	Patrick Timsit	
1999	Le juge est une femme	Nonzi	Pierre Boutron	TV series (1 episode)
2000	Sentimental Destinies	Guy Barnery	Olivier Assayas	
2000	Code Unknown	The Director	Michael Haneke	
2000	Most Promising Young Actress	Belabre	Gérard Jugnot	
2000	The Crimson Rivers	The Dean	Mathieu Kassovitz	
2001	Les Rois mages	The Mother's Friend	Didier Bourdon & Bernard Campan	
2001	The Château	Jean	Jesse Peretz	
2001	Ceci est mon corps	Gabriel	Rodolphe Marconi	
2001	Avec préméditation	Edouard	Bernard Villiot	Short
2002	The Race	Lino	Djamel Bensalah	
2002	Merci Docteur Rey	The Detective	Andrew Litvack	
2002	If I Were a Rich Man	Monsieur Agénor	Gérard Bitton & Michel Munz	
2002	Sexes très opposés	Gérard	Eric Assous	
2002	Le juge est une femme	Judge Gendreau	Pierre Boutron	TV series (1 episode)
2003	Dissonances	Henry	Jérôme Cornuau	
2003	Dans le rouge du couchant	Kusnet	Edgardo Cozarinsky	
2003	Par amour	The Comedian	Yvon Marciano	Short
2003	Les Liaisons dangereuses	The Director	Josée Dayan	TV mini-series
2003	Franck Keller	Luc Vernet	Claude-Michel Rome	TV series (1 episode)
2004	The Chorus	Old Pépinot	Christophe Barratier	
2004	L'Enquête Corse	Dargent	Alain Berbérian	
2004	The Ex-Wife of My Life	René	Josiane Balasko	
2004	Double zéro	Pierre de Franqueville	Gérard Pirès	
2004	Princesse Marie	Jean	Benoît Jacquot	TV movie
2004	Julie, chevalier de Maupin	Gaston de Maupin	Charlotte Brändström	TV movie
2004	Louis Page	Father March	Jean-Daniel Verhaeghe	TV series (1 episode)
2005	Factotum	Pierre	Bent Hamer	
2005	Love	Jean Mitnick Rochand	Vladan Nikolic	
2005	Travaux, on sait quand ça commence...	Thierry	Brigitte Roüan	
2005	Imposture	Massignon	Patrick Bouchitey	
2005	Vive la vie	The Psy	Yves Fajnberg	
2005	Vous êtes libre ?	Paul	Pierre Joassin	TV movie
2005	Le proc	Édouard Grimault	Claudio Tonetti	TV series (1 episode)
2005	Vénus & Apollon	Alexandre	Pascal Lahmani	TV series (2 episodes)
2005	Les Montana	Charles Montana	Benoît d'Aubert	TV series (3 episodes)
2006	Les Brigades du Tigre	Louis Lépine	Jérôme Cornuau	
2006	La Maison du Bonheur	The Banker	Dany Boon	
2006	Jeune homme	Hugues Dumoulin	Christoph Schaub	
2006	L'entente cordiale	General Mandelieu	Vincent De Brus	
2006	Sentence finale	Director of the Psychiatric	Franck Allera	Short
2006	La blonde au bois dormant	Doctor Georges Parrain	Sébastien Grall	TV movie
2006	La tempête	Christopher	Bertrand Arthuys	TV movie
2007	L'île aux trésors	The Buzzard	Alain Berbérian	
2007	L'affaire Christian Ranucci	The Bar Tenor	Denys Granier-Deferre	TV movie
2008	Vincent, le magnifique	Blackstone	Pascal Forney	Short
2008	Une maman pour un coeur	Professor Sarlat	Patrice Martineau	TV movie
2009	Don't Look Back	Robert	Marina de Van	
2010	Zenith	The Rich Man	Vladan Nikolic	
2010	Coursier	Maurice Skjqurilngskwicz	Hervé Renoh	
2010	Double enquête	André Costes	Pierre Boutron	TV movie
2010	En cas de malheur	Marc Guérand	Jean-Daniel Verhaeghe	TV movie
2010	Frères	Lazare	Virginie Sauveur	TV movie
2010	La plus pire semaine de ma vie	Richard	Frédéric Auburtin	TV series (2 episodes)
2010	1788... et demi	Armand du Roy d'Aranson	Olivier Guignard	TV series (3 episodes)
2011	Let My People Go !	André	Mikael Buch	
2011	Chicken with Plums	The Music Master	Marjane Satrapi & Vincent Paronnaud	
2011	Notre paradis	Victor	Gaël Morel	
2011	Forces spéciales	Jacques Beauregard	Stéphane Rybojad	
2011	Une pure affaire	Michel	Alexandre Coffre	
2011	V comme Vian	Jean Paulhan	Philippe Le Guay	TV movie
2011	Les belles soeurs	Yvan	Gabriel Aghion	TV movie
2011	Changer la vie !	Jacques Chaban-Delmas	Serge Moati	TV movie
2011	À la maison pour Noël	Jeff	Christian Merret-Palmair	TV movie
2012	Il était une fois, une fois	Monsieur Detarnaud	Christian Merret-Palmair	
2012	Des soucis et des hommes	Etienne	Christophe Barraud	TV series (3 episodes)
2013	L'harmonie familiale	René	Camille de Casabianca	
2013	Win Win	Schmid	Claudio Tonetti	
2013	Clownwise	Oskar	Viktor Taus	
2013	Sidney	The Man	Karan Kandhari	Short
2013	Quartier latin	Eugène Delaporte	Michel Andrieu	TV movie
2013	Rouge Brésil	Thévet	Sylvain Archambault	TV mini-series
2014	1001 Grams	Gérard	Bent Hamer	
2014	The Easy Way Out	Chastenet	Brice Cauvin	
2014	Allure	Jean	Vladan Nikolic	
2014	La guerre des ondes	Philippe Henriot	Laurent Jaoui	TV movie
2014	Ma pire angoisse	Noémie's Father	Vladimir Rodionov	TV series (1 episode)
2015	Forget-you-not		Elisabeth Loesch	
2015	Parallel Dreams	Joseph Cornell	Aleksandar Kostic	Short
2015	Le Dernier Cigare	Paul	Kevin Haefelin	Short
2015	Stavisky, l'escroc du siècle	The Unknown	Claude-Michel Rome	TV movie
2015	Le passager	Jean-Claude Chatelet	Jérôme Cornuau	TV mini-series
2016	Back to Mom's	Jean	Éric Lavaine	
2016	The law of Christophe	Charles Devaux	Jacques Malaterre	TV movie
2023	Little Girl Blue	Jorge Semprún	Mona Achache	
2023	Daaaaaalí!	Salvador Dalí	Quentin Dupieux	
2024	Everything That Will Happen Has Already Happened	The Actor	Vladan Nikolic	

=== Director ===
Year	Title	Notes
1993	La vis	Short; Also Writer; César Award for Best Short Film; Brest European Short Film Festival - Best First Work; Tampere International Short Film Festival - Best Fiction; Nominated - Academy Award for Best Live Action Short Film; Nominated - Chicago International Film Festival - Best Short Film
2005	Tête de gondole	Short
2010	The Spirit of Navigation	Short
