= Allure (2014 film) =

- Theatrical release poster
- Directed by: Vladan Nikolic
- Story by: Vladan Nikolic
- Produced by: Vladan Nikolic; Aleksandar Kostic; Kenneth Anderson; Von Harris; Vladana Ilic; Lara Sfire; Eric Werthman
- Starring: Madeleine Assas; Didier Flamand; Caveh Zahedi
- Cinematography: Aleksandar Kostic
- Edited by: Vladan Nikolic
- Music by: Yves Dharamraj
- Release dates: November 14, 2014 (Tallinn Black Nights Film Festival); March 6, 2015
- Running time: 85 minutes
- Country: United States
- Languages: English, French, Spanish, Mandarin

Allure is a 2014 independent feature film written, directed and edited by Vladan Nikolic. It is based on true stories. Filmmakers and performers - actors and non-actors - worked together to flesh out the story and protagonists. All scenes and dialogue in the film were improvised.

Some scenes were shot with actors participating in the actual Occupy Wall Street protests of 2011 and 2012. The film premiered at the 2014 Black Nights film festival in Tallinn, Estonia, where it was nominated for best North American Independent feature film, and had a limited release in the US in March 2015, followed by on video-on-demand and online streaming in the Fall of 2015.

== Plot ==
Billed as an "experiment in situationist cinema," the film focuses on five women in New York, who have come from different countries and settings. Each one struggles to overcome her personal conflict, set against the Occupy Wall Street movements of 2011. These separate, but intersecting multi-ethnic storylines touch and inform each other, and create a larger narrative about gender, emigration, power, class, and personal politics. The film also references some ideas of The Society of the Spectacle by Guy Debord through contemporary stories.

== Cast ==
- Madeleine Assas as Valerie
- Didier Flamand as Jean
- Caveh Zahedi as The Professor
- Diana Lotus as Liliana
- Ying Ying Li as Jin
- Julia Konrad as Marta
- Aisha de Bankole as Kasoke

== Production ==
The film was produced in an unusual and experimental way, on almost no budget. Filmmakers and actors formed a co-op, shooting non-consecutively in New York City over several months in the summer and fall of 2012.

== Critical reception ==
The film opened to positive or mixed reviews. Jeannette Catsoulis in The New York Times wrote: "Mr. Nikolic, who teaches film at the New School, draws lovely performances from his cosmopolitan cast and oodles of atmosphere." Frank Scheck of The Hollywood Reporter remarked that, while the film boasts "striking black-and-white, widescreen cinematography by Aleksandar Kostic and strong performances by its ethnically diverse ensemble, Allure never quite coheres into a dramatically arresting whole," while Michael Nordine of The Village Voice commented that "Allure tries to make sense of the Occupy Movement."

== See also ==
- List of French-language films
- List of Mandarin-language films
