= Jamie King (producer) =

British filmmaker, writer, and activist

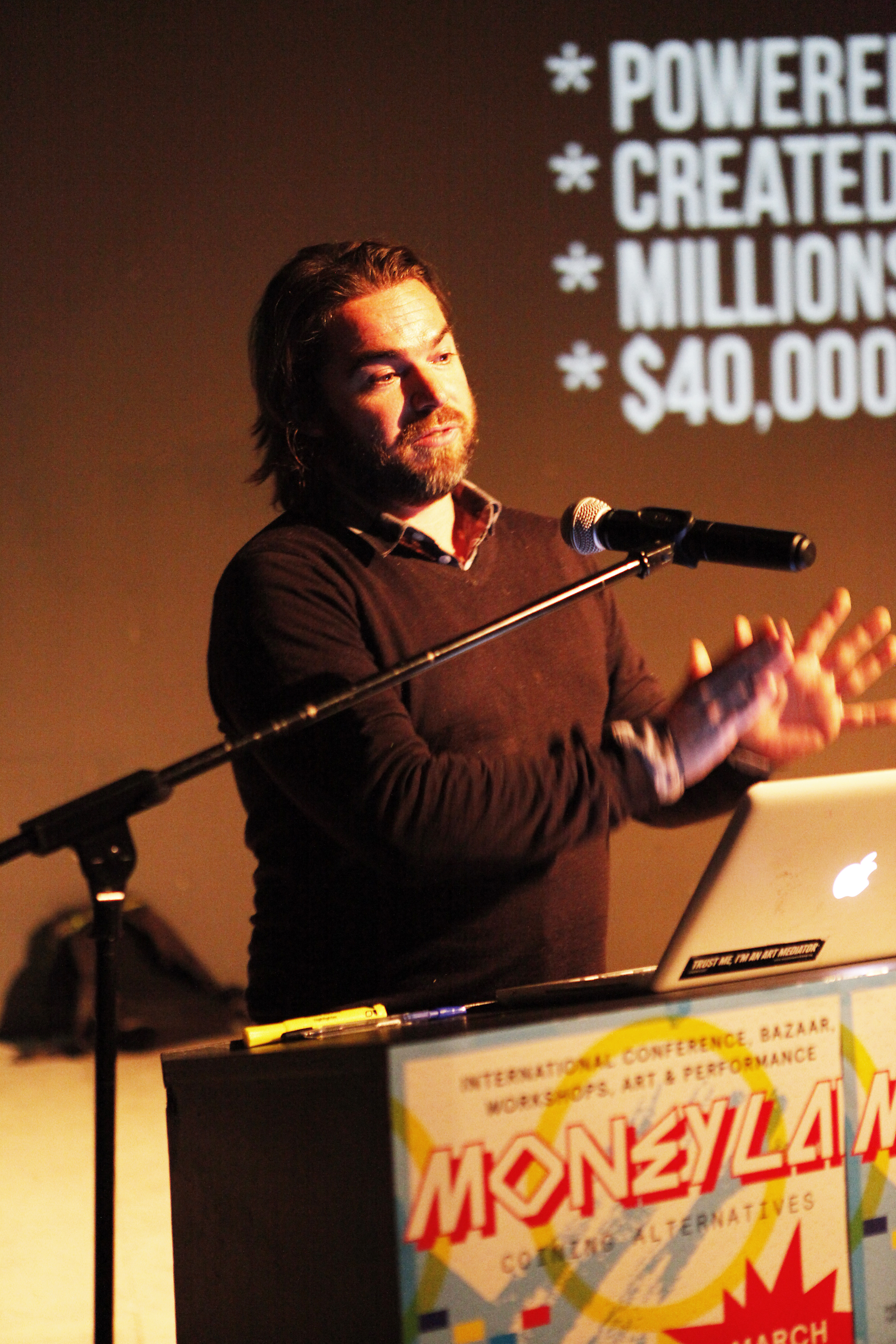
- Occupations: Film director, producer, and writer
- Notable work: Steal This Film, VODO

Jamie King is a British filmmaker, writer, and activist, best known for directing Steal This Film, a documentary that observes intellectual property in favour of P2P filesharing. He is also the founder of VODO, an online crossmedia distribution project for film, games, books, and music. Ted Hope described King as one of the "great free thinkers of Indie film." He is currently host of the podcast STEAL THIS SHOW, produced in conjunction with TorrentFreak.

Jamie King studied Philosophy at the University of Southampton, where he received a PhD for his thesis, "

Jamie King was an original member of the Mute editorial team and served as the Information politics editor and deputy editor. During this time, he also published columns on the development of online culture for ITN and Channel 4 News.

In 2006 he produced Steal This Film, one of the most downloaded film documentaries to date. In the following year, he produced and directed Steal This Film 2 and Steal This Film “Spectrial Edition” (also called Steal This Film 2.5).

In 2009 he founded VODO, a media distribution, crowdfunding and attention-sourcing network for independent artists. VODO has distributed prominent projects including The Yes Men Fix The World, Pioneer One, and Zeitgeist. VODO has also generated millions of dollars in revenue using free-sharing distribution and voluntary payment models.

King has also delivered lectures and keynotes at various events and top-tier universities worldwide. He has published fiction, academic articles, as well as numerous articles in international media including The Times, The Guardian, the Telegraph, and others.

He served as executive producer of the BitTorrent-only TV show titled Pioneer One. Part of his film work has been featured in the Oscar-nominated film The Internet's Own Boy. King currently hosts a podcast produced in conjunction with TorrentFreak titled Steal This Show. He also continues to work in other peer-to-peer distribution-related projects.

== Filmography ==
Film	Year	Role
Steal This Film	2006	Director
Steal This Film 2	2007	Director
In Guantanamo	2009	Producer
Dark Fibre	2009	Co-director
Patent Absurdity	2010	Producer
Republic of Soya	2011	Director
