= Texas (2005 film) =

- Theatrical release poster
- Directed by: Fausto Paravidino
- Written by: Fausto Paravidino; Iris Fusetti; Carlo Orlando
- Produced by: Ivan Fiorini
- Starring: Fausto Paravidino; Riccardo Scamarcio; Iris Fusetti; Alessia Bellotto; Valerio Binasco; Valeria Golino
- Cinematography: Gherardo Gossi
- Edited by: Giogiò Franchini
- Music by: Nicola Tescari
- Production company: Fandango
- Distributed by: Medusa Film
- Release date: 2005
- Running time: 100 minutes
- Country: Italy
- Language: Italian

Texas is a 2005 Italian drama film written and directed by Fausto Paravidino and starring Riccardo Scamarcio and Valeria Golino. It was screened in the Horizons section at the 62nd Venice International Film Festival.

== Plot ==
A group of friends reunites each Saturday evening at Elisa’s small villa. They drink a couple of shots, joke, mess up the house, whatever they have to do not to realize they’re becoming adults. All of them live in the vast outskirts, so far from the city they can barely be called outskirts. In the span of a few months the sudden passage from adolescence to the adult age develops in the group, through grudges, fears and insecurities. The life of the group of friends and the small town risks being disturbed because of the adulterous relationship between the teacher in the elementary school of the town, Maria, with the younger Gianluca, son of a mayor candidate. Gianluca, in turn, cheats on his girlfriend Cinzia of whom Enrico, Gianluca’s best friend, is secretly in love. In the meantime the other friend Davide solves with violence his insecurities with women.

== Cast ==
- Valeria Golino as Maria
- Riccardo Scamarcio as Gianluca
- Valerio Binasco as Alessandro
- Fausto Paravidino as Enrico
- Iris Fusetti as Cinzia
- Alessia Bellotto as Elisa
- Carlo Orlando as Davide

== See also ==
- List of Italian films of 2005
