= Us Now =

- Directed by: Ivo Gormley
- Produced by: Hugh Hartford (Banyak Films)
- Cinematography: Robin Fox
- Edited by: Mark Atkins
- Music by: Orlando Roberton (Pixelphonics)
- Release date: April 2009
- Running time: 60 minutes
- Country: United Kingdom
- Language: English

Us Now is a 2009 documentary film project "about the power of mass collaboration, the government and the Internet". The New York Times describes it as a film which "paints a future in which every citizen is connected to the state as easily as to Facebook, choosing policies, questioning politicians, collaborating with neighbours."

The documentary weaves together the perceptions of leading thinkers on the power of the web, with the overriding suggestion that people gain a sense of satisfaction from active participation rather than symbolic representation in decision-making processes. (Rebecca Frankel, editor of Channel 4's FourDocs)

The project claims the founding principles of mass collaborative projects, including transparency, self-selection and open-participation are nearing mainstream social and political lives. Us Now describes this transition and confronts politicians George Osborne and Ed Miliband with the possibilities for collaborative government as described by Don Tapscott and Clay Shirky amongst others.

== Synopsis ==
The Us Now website describes the project as an examination of the role of the internet, and more specifically Web 2.0 in facilitating direct public governance without the need for politicians. The film tells the stories of the online mass collaboration projects such as Mumsnet, CouchSurfing, Slice the Pie and My Football Club whose self-organising structures may "threaten to change the fabric of government."

== Release and distribution ==
Us Now premiered at the Prince Charles Cinema in December 2008 and was released in spring '09 for free online viewing. All of the material generated during the project is available to view and download on a Creative Commons license "and also encourages others to remix the core content with the 20 hours of footage available on the Us Now website (and presumably their own material) to draw other conclusions."
Following release online the film was screened on Channel 4's More4 on 11 July 2009. In late 2009 Us Now was the first film to be distributed on VODO, a legal torrent distribution website, and received 100,000 downloads in its first five days of being available. The film has been translated and subtitled into 29 languages on the dotSUB platform and has been screened in many locations across the world.

== See also ==
- Electronic direct democracy
- Open source governance
- Participatory democracy
- E-democracy
- Participatory culture and technology
- Collaborative e-democracy
- Metagovernment, international group of projects instantiating a vision similar to the one in this film
