= VODO =

Online media distributor offering films, books, games and music

VODO was an online media distributor offering films, books, games and music under pay-what-you-want pricing models. Founded by film director Jamie King, VODO has recently focused on bundle offers, bringing together a variety of creators under the themes of H.P. Lovecraft, Big Brother (surveillance and privacy), NSFW (sex positive culture), Otherworlds (sci-fi) and Really Creepy (indie horror).

VODO's background is in distribution of film under Creative Commons licenses, using the BitTorrent protocol. Filmmakers can upload films on the site and selected works are also promoted on third-party sites and services such as the Butter Project, μTorrent and The Pirate Bay.

Past releases include sci-fi series Pioneer One, The Yes Men Fix the World and Zenith. Users are encouraged to donate after watching the films, and the highest earning to date has received almost $100,000.

== VODO releases ==
As of February 2012, VODO hosts a total of 148 films. Some of the most known are listed below.

Date	Title	Version	Director	Notes
2009-10-17	Us Now		Ivo Gormley	
2009-11-11	In Guantanamo		David Miller	
2009-12-19	The Lionshare		Josh Bernhard	Included Legacy by Grzegorz Jonkajtys
2010-02-08	Mixtape#1		Various	
2010-06-15	Pioneer One	S01E01	Bracey Smith	A REDUX cut was released 2010-12-15 featuring additional footage and re-shot scenes.
2010-07-23	The Yes Men Fix The World		The Yes Men	Special 'P2P Edition' of the film including new footage from the House of Commerce.
2010-10-02	Person of Interest		Gregory Bayne	
2010-11-10	Snowblind		Kilian Manning	
2010-11-10	Four Eyed Monsters		Arin Crumley, Susan Buice	
2010-12-15	Pioneer One	S01E02	Bracey Smith	
2011-01-28	Beyond the Game		Jos de Putter	
2011-03-14	Zenith	Part 1	Anonymous	
2011-03-28	Pioneer One	S01E03	Bracey Smith	
2011-04-28	Zenith	Part 2	Anonymous	
2011-04-28	Pioneer One	S01E04	Bracey Smith	
2011-05-19	The Tunnel		Carlo Ledesma	
2011-06-03	Zenith	Part 3	Anonymous	
2011-07-01	A Lonely Place for Dying		Justin Eugene Evans	
2011-10-05	Pioneer One	S01E05	Bracey Smith	
2011-12-13	Pioneer One	S01E06	Bracey Smith	Season 1 finale
2011-12-27	Otherworlds		various	six original Sci-Fi short films: The Third Letter, Perspective, The Return of John Frum, Dimensional Meltdown, Candy, Kitty-Kitty and IDT
2012-01-20	The Notorious Newman Brothers		Ryan Noel	Retro Films Entertainment & Substance Production
2012-02-21	L5		Stanley Von Medvey	Studio Hemogoblin

== Free Film Fund ==
As from 17 January 2012, five percent of all VODO income was allocated to the Free Film Fund, an online fundraising forum for the development of free-to-share productions.
