= Zenith (film) =

- Promotional poster
- Directed by: Vladan Nikolic
- Screenplay by: Vladan Nikolic
- Story by: Vladan Nikolic
- Produced by: Vladan Nikolic; George Lekovic; Jason Robards III (co-producer)
- Starring: Peter Scanavino; Jason Robards III; Ana Asensio
- Cinematography: Vladimir Subotic
- Edited by: Milica Zec
- Music by: Luigi Colarullo
- Release date: October 1, 2010
- Running time: 93 minutes
- Country: United States
- Language: English

Zenith (also styled as Zenith - A Film by Anonymous) is a 2010 American psychological thriller directed by Vladan Nikolic and starring Peter Scanavino, Jason Robards III, and Ana Asensio. The screenplay concerns two men attempting to solve the same conspiracy theory. The title refers to a grand 'Zenith Conspiracy' formed by the film's protagonist, Ed Crowley. The film also utilizes an alternate reality game and transmedia storytelling to augment its narrative.

Zenith premiered at The IFC Center in New York City on October 1, 2010, and had an extended run in January 2011 at the Kraine Theatre with its distribution company, Cinema Purgatorio. All three parts have been made available as a free-to-share download at the BitTorrent powered distribution site VODO.

== Plot ==
In the post-apocalyptic year 2044, the population has been genetically altered to live in a constant state of happiness, but without sorrow, happiness dissipates, leaving only a feeling of never-ending paresthesia. Only pain can make people feel alive.

Jack (Peter Scanavino), a young man and former neurosurgeon, is a peddler of substances that induce pain. A stranger knocks on Jack's door and hands him a single video tape that Jack's long lost father, Ed Alexander Crowley (Jason Robards III), left behind. It is the first in a series of 10 tapes in which Ed has documented his life and his pursuit of what he calls the “Grand Conspiracy,” a conspiracy that quite possibly could be the answer to what happened to Jack's world.

Inspired by his father's tape, Jack sets out on his own investigation. But in order to solve the whole puzzle, he must locate the remaining nine tapes. Jack begins to track down four more tapes, but the larger answer still eludes him.

Jack meets the provocative Lisa (Ana Asensio) in a strip club, and is struck by the fact that she is just as conflicted and lonely as he is. Through her, Jack encounters the possibility of real love. As Jack finds the remaining tapes, the lines between his interior and exterior world blur, leading him to question reality itself. Lisa and Jack decide to abandon the search for the tapes and leave the city.

Jack locates Ed's last tape, and is suddenly faced with the same choice his father had to make forty years ago: to surrender his soul, or to remain true to himself, no matter the consequences. Jack's reality becomes the same reality as the final tape.

Jack is revealed to be an institutionalized patient (named Ed Crowley) with both epilepsy and a brain tumor, taking part in a clinical research trial in 2012, scribbling notes about Zenith while being monitored by a camera in his cell, wondering if this isn't another part of the conspiracy.

== Cast ==
- Peter Scanavino as Jack Crowley
- Jason Robards III as Ed Crowley
- Ana Asensio as Lisa Berger
- Al Nazemian as Nimble
- Arthur French as Mateo
- Raynor Scheine as Dale
- David Thornton as Rudolf Berger
- Jay O. Sanders as Doug Oberts
- Tim Biancalana as Hank Mirren
- Didier Flamand as The Rich Man
- Kenneth Anderson as Lanky Man

== Production ==
Zenith was written and directed by Vladan Nikolic.

== BitTorrent promotion ==
On March 16, 2011, BitTorrent Inc. promoted an open licensed version (CC by-nc-nd) of the first section of the film for two weeks with Vodo.net and other torrent-based distribution partners. Users downloading BitTorrent client software are encouraged to download and share the first of three parts of the film during the software installation. On May 4, 2011, Part Two of the film was made available on Vodo. The BitTorrent promotion and ARG transmedia campaign resulted in over a million downloads of the first section of the film.

== Reception ==
Upon the film's limited release in theaters, reviews ranged from positive to mixed. In the Village Voice, Michael Atkinson noted, "A brooding science-fiction trip enjoyed largely as a monologue. Luckily, Nikolic's lust for paranoid desperation is powerful, and his way with actors is stunningly graceful."

Joe Leydon praised the film in Variety: "Smoothly incorporating influences as diverse as Philip K. Dick and Terry Gilliam, Zenith commands attention and builds suspense by taking inventive detours through familiar territory."

Maitland McDonagh wrote in Film Journal International that the film weaves together "dystopian visions of a desensitized, crumbling future a la Philip K. Dick and J.G. Ballard, in which ubiquitous techno-distractions, dispassionate sex and dependence on artificial sensation are gradually leaching the humanity from the human race."

Jeannette Catsoulis in The New York Times commented, this "bewildering collision of noir narration and purple paranoia may be long on atmosphere but is woefully short on sense."

Noel Murray of The A.V. Club gave the 90-minute film a C+, while calling it "an audacious, impressive feat of imagination, turning a few sets and characters into a generation-spanning look at a society where benevolence and malevolence are so finely interwoven that it’s hard to know what to fight against." Murray found that, in 90-minute film form, it "doesn’t fully work"; both the beginning and end of the film were "strong", but in between, the film seemed padded with "cheesy-looking sex and fight scenes, and with a doubling-back narrative structure" that was confusing, and looked like an "attempt to save money by reusing footage."

Kevin Thomas wrote in the Los Angeles Times "Many of Nikolic's concerns and motifs are familiar yet their expression here is vivid and idiosyncratic, designed to intensify a highly contemporary concern about the loss of freedom and power of the individual to secret, manipulative cartels."

Brett Michel in the Boston Herald gave the film a "B", and remarked, "persistent voiceover narration, a device that helps smooth over a lack of scene transitions — [is] one area that exposes the film’s budgetary limitations. Still, the use of dilapidated Brooklyn and Queens locations, creatively photographed by Vladimir Subotic, goes a ways toward selling a future not too far removed from ones en-visioned by Philip K. Dick or J.G. Ballard."

Loren Smith of the Boston Globe noted "With its bleak fatalism, “Zenith’’ at times echoes futuristic thrillers such as “12 Monkeys’’ and “Children of Men.’’ The shoestring budget is often obvious, with one too many strobe-light sequences, and it is dispiriting that even a movie set in 2044 has a gold-hearted hooker as the hero’s object of desire. But “Zenith’’ boasts terrific photography by Vladimir Subotic and offers a few genuine surprises. Director Nikolic shouldn’t remain “anonymous’’ for long: He gets solid performances from all the actors and creates an atmosphere of mounting paranoia that’s grim and chilling."
