= The Buffalo Boy =

2004 film

- The Buffalo Boy film poster
- Directed by: Nguyễn Võ Nghiêm Minh
- Written by: Nguyễn Võ Nghiêm Minh
- Produced by: Jean Bréhat, Christoph Thoke
- Starring: Antony Bert; The Lu Le
- Distributed by: Global Film Initiative
- Release date: 14 August 2004 (Toronto Film Festival)
- Running time: 102 min
- Country: Vietnam
- Language: Vietnamese

The Buffalo Boy (Vietnamese: Mùa len trâu, French: Le Gardien des Buffles) is a 2004 film directed by Nguyễn Võ Nghiêm Minh. The movie was the official entry from Vietnam for Best Foreign Language Film category at the 78th Academy Awards. It was filmed in Cà Mau province, Vietnam's southernmost province.

== Plot summary ==
An old man named Kim is telling his family history to his grand daughter, as she found the bones of his father.

When he was a boy, Kim's father was ill when their lands flooded. His two buffaloes had no forage. Kim takes the two buffaloes in search of good grass. He joins Lap's herding team, but one of the two buffaloes dies.

Later he helps Det, who builds a new herding team with him to reunite with his girlfriend and their son, whom Det hasn't seen for 5 years.

When Kim hears his father is dying, he goes to U Minh. The father reveals the truth of Kim's ancestry. A couple of strangers help Kim put his father's corpse in a safe place in the water, until the flooding subsides and he can be properly buried.

Lap confirms what Kim's father told him as he died:--that Kim's true mother is the sister of Lap, whom Kim's father raped on a buffalo herding run.

Kim tries to rape Det's wife. Det dies in a skirmish between Lap's and Kieng's buffalo herding teams. Kim adopts Det's son, Thiệu.

In a voiceover, Kim says that the Japanese came in to drive out the French, and then were themselves driven out. This political change does not seem to affect rural Vietnam.
