= 9:06 =

2009 film directed by Igor Šterk

- Film poster
- Directed by: Igor Šterk
- Produced by: Igor Šterk, Christoph Thoke
- Starring: Igor Samobor
- Cinematography: Simon Tansek
- Edited by: Petar Markovic
- Release date: 9 May 2009 (EuroCine 27)
- Running time: 71 minutes
- Country: Slovenia
- Language: Slovene

9:06 is a 2009 Slovene thriller film directed by Igor Šterk. The film was selected as the Slovene entry for the Best Foreign Language Film at the 83rd Academy Awards but it did not make the final shortlist. The film won 15 awards at the 2009 Slovene Film Festival, including Best Film and Best Director.

== Cast ==
- Silva Cusin - Ex Wife
- Labina Mitevska - Milena
- Pavle Ravnohrib - Tine
- Igor Samobor - Dusan

== See also ==
- List of submissions to the 83rd Academy Awards for Best Foreign Language Film
- List of Slovenian submissions for the Academy Award for Best Foreign Language Film
