= Fausto Paravidino =

Italian dramatist, director, actor and screenwriter

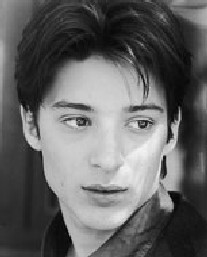
- Born: 15 June 1976 (age 49); Genoa, Italy
- Occupation(s): Director; Screenwriter

Fausto Paravidino (born 15 June 1976) is an Italian dramatist, director, actor and screenwriter.

== Life and career ==
Born in Genoa, Paravidino spent his childhood in Rocca Grimalda, Alessandria. He started his professional career on stage at very young age, in 1990, as part of the company "La Soffitta". In 1995, he moved back to Genoa, where he enrolled at the drama courses of the Teatro Nazionale. In 1996 he wrote his first comedy play, Trinciapollo, and in 1998 he came to the fore thanks to the critically acclaimed dramas Gabriele and Due Fratelli.

Paravidino made his film debut in 1999, appearing in Pupi Avati's Midsummer Night's Dance. In 2000 his play Peanuts was represented at the Royal Court Theatre. In 2004 he won the Vittorio Gassman Prize for the drama play Natura morta in un fosso. The play was staged by Andrea Ferran for Volta International Festival at the Arcola Theatre in 2016.

Paravidino made his directorial film debut in 2005 with Texas, which was screened in the Horizons section at the 62nd edition of the Venice Film Festival and got him a Pasinetti Award. For this film he was also nominated for David di Donatello for Best New Director and for Nastro d'Argento in the same category and for Best Original Story.

Paravidino was the eighth Italian author to be presented at the Comédie-Française in Paris, with the play La malattia della famiglia M ("La Maladie de la famille M." in its French adaptation) he also directed. Other of his works were adapted in German and presented in various theaters, including at the Schaubühne am Lehniner Platz.
