= Lorraine Leckie =

Canadian singer and songwriter

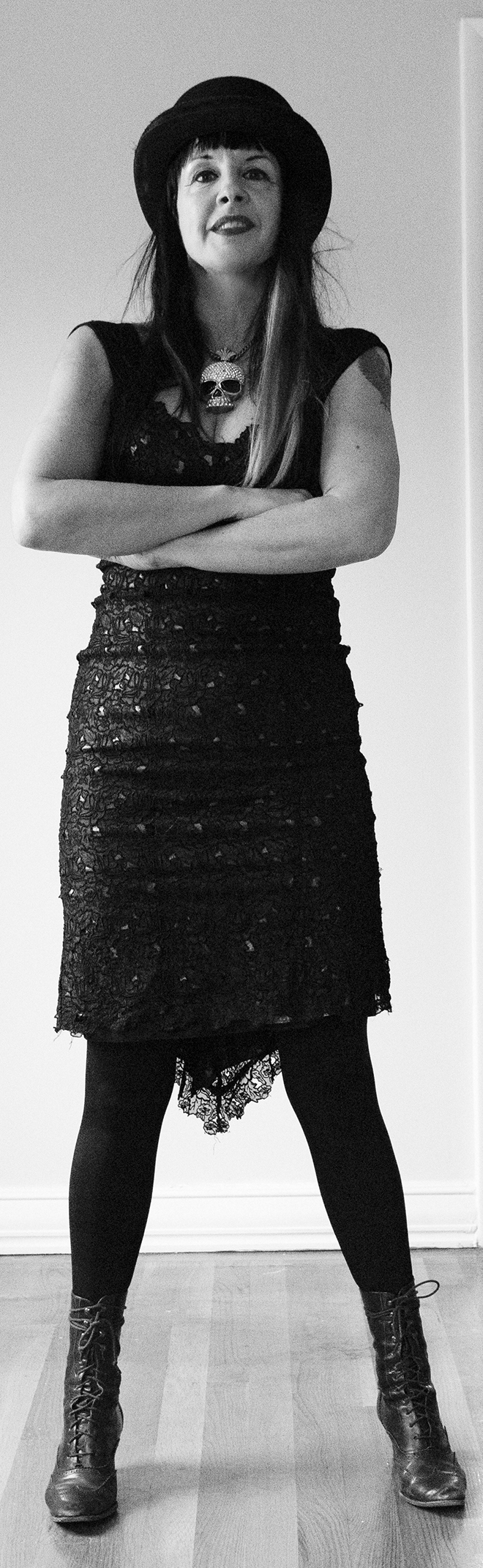

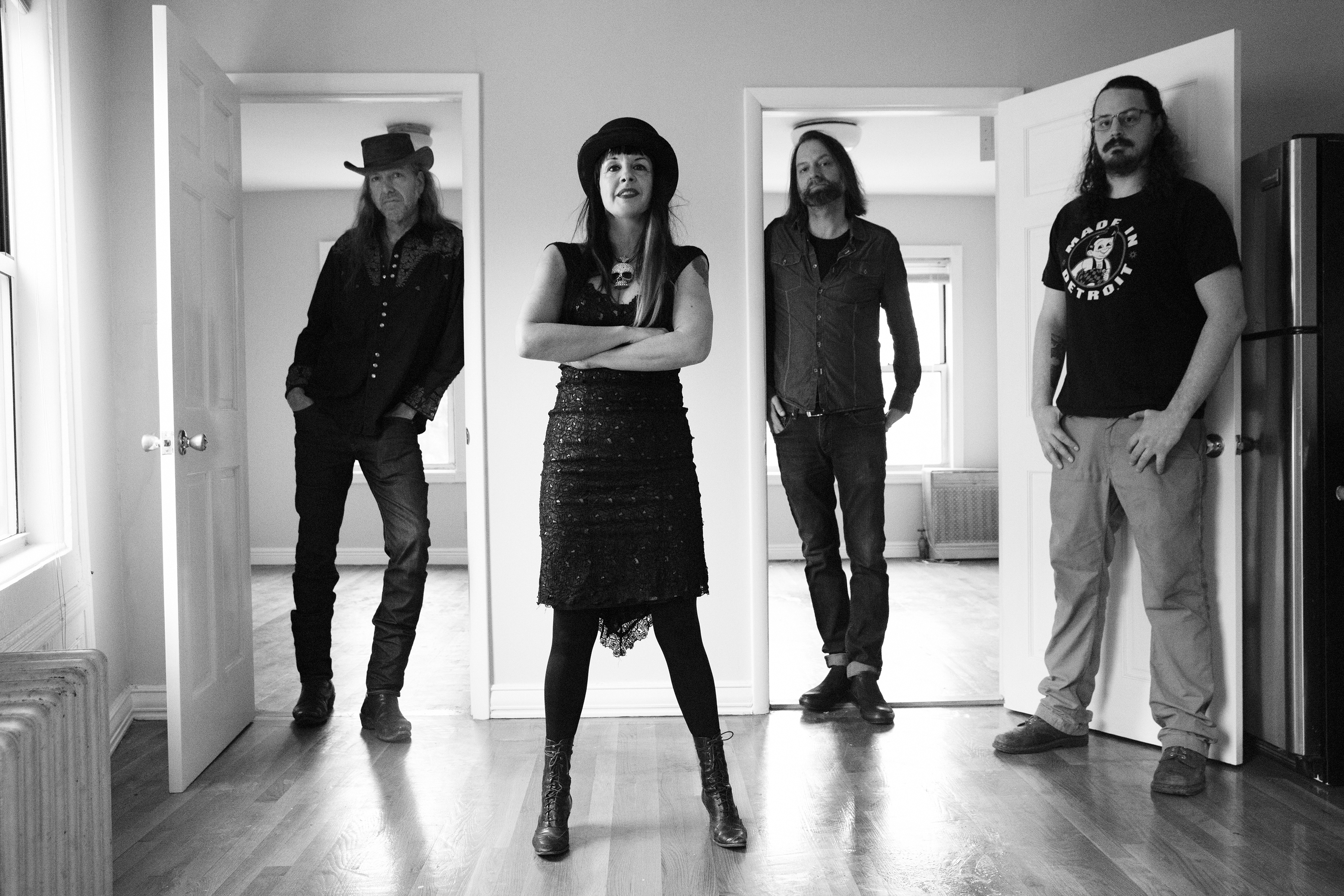
Photo by John Huba

Lorraine Leckie (née Turansky), is a New York City based Canadian singer and songwriter. She performs solo and with her Brooklyn-based rock band Lorraine Leckie & Her Demons.

== Biography ==
Lorraine Leckie was born and raised in Whitby, Ontario, near Toronto, with her sister Brenda Turansky and brother Paul Turansky (deceased). In her early years, she was surrounded by the music of Neil Young and The Rolling Stones, but in the seventies she converted to punk rock, married Steve Leckie of The Viletones, and started her career as a makeup artist in the fashion industry. After a decade of working in Europe, she put down roots in New York City and began working with celebrity clients such as Paul McCartney, Claudia Schiffer, Carla Bruni, and Heidi Klum. By the age of 37, Leckie changed her style to that of a guitar and started performing by the age of 40. Leckie earned her title as the Lower East Side folk noir troubadour playing venues such as Bowery Ballroom, Webster Hall & Mercury Lounge, often joined by her Rock band, Her Demons.

Lorraine Leckie & Her Demons released their first full-length album, 'Four Cold Angels,' in 2008, a deeply rooted rock album with grungy guitar and heavy-hitting drums. 'Four Cold Angels' was rated on The Village Voice's Pazz and Jop 2008 list, and the song "Ontario" was on Pazz & Jop 2009. Anton Newcombe of Brian Jonestown Massacre collaborated and sang with Leckie on a cover of the Pogues’ “Dirty Old Town” for the album. The song went on to become the featured title track for the acclaimed 2011 film 'Dirty Old Town' directed by Jenner Furst. The film is an ode to the Lower East Side starring Billy Leroy, the actor and Leckie's current husband.

A departure from her rock n' roll debut, Leckie released her solo album, Martini Eyes, in New York on September 29, 2010.

Leckie's next album, 'Rudely Interrupted' was a collaboration with Anthony Haden-Guest. Drawing inspiration from Haden-Guest's book of cartoons and verses, "In The Mean Time." 'Rudely Interrupted' was released in New York on November 12, 2012 at the Mercury Lounge.

In 2014, Leckie released Rebel Devil Devil Rebel, her third album and second with a full band. Receiving positive response: the Huffington Post called Leckie a "Noir folk rock goddess", and No Depression characterized it as "A sonic rave-up worthy of Neil's Crazy Horse."

Leckie's next album, The Raven Smiled, was released in 2015, a spare collaboration with Czech violinist Pavel Cingl. Critics responded favorably: both Modern Folk and New Canadian Music compared the chemistry between the two musicians to the rapport between Nick Cave and Warren Ellis, while the blog Days of Purple and Orange called it "utterly bewitching."

In 2018, Leckie released Live at Mercury Lounge NYC, the final concert played by drummer Paul Triff, who died shortly thereafter the show. New York Music Daily ranked the album among the fifty best of the year.

During the pandemic of 2020, Leckie released Razor Wing Butterfly (released on June 26, 2020), a full-length studio album, and a single “Lady With The Dark Eyes” which was used as a fundraiser for the Biden/Harris campaign.

In 2021 Lorraine and Hugh Pool released singles "Good Morning Andrew" and "When the War is Over." On Feb 3rd 2023 LLDH released a single “Blue & Yellow” which is a tribute to the Ukrainian people. She released the singles “Misfits” in November 2023, "My Lucky Number is Zero" in January 2025, and "Monica Forever" on July 20, 2025, in honor of her mother. Lorraine Leckie and Her Demons recorded a new album, Goddamn Outer Space, released November 7, 2025.

== Discography ==
Year released	Album title	Credits
2008	Four Cold Angels	Lorraine Leckie (words except*, vocals, acoustic guitar, piano); Hugh Pool (production except **, recording, guitar, harmonica, mandolin, percussion); George Jackson (bass guitar); Paul Triff (drums, percussion); *Ewan MacColl (words and music for "Dirty Old Town"); **Anton Newcombe (production, guitar, bass guitar, harmonica for "Dirty Old Town")
2010	Martini Eyes	Lorraine Leckie (all words, vocals, guitar, piano, harmonica); George Jackson (production, recording)
2012	Rudely Interrupted	Lorraine Leckie (words, composition, vocals except*, guitar, piano); *Anthony Haden-Guest (original verses as published in the book "In The Mean Time", vocals on "Goodbye to All This"); George Jackson (production, bass. floor tom, guitar); Hugh Pool (guitar, lap steel, harmonica); Matt Kanelos (piano); Tracy Ann Blaser (violin); Charles Dechants (recording)
2014	Rebel Devil Devil Rebel	Lorraine Leckie (words, vocals, acoustic guitar, piano); Hugh Pool (production, recording, guitar, harmonica, mandolin, percussion); Charles DeChants (bass guitar); Paul Triff (drums, percussion)
2015	The Raven Smiled	Lorraine Leckie (words, vocals, acoustic guitar, piano); Pavel Cingl (production, violin)
2018	Live at Mercury Lounge NYC	Lorraine Leckie (words, vocals, acoustic guitar, piano); Hugh Pool (guitar); Charles DeChants (bass guitar); Paul Triff (drums, percussion)
2020	Razor Wing Butterfly	Lorraine Leckie (words, vocals, guitars, and piano ); Hugh Pool (guitars, wurlitzer, tambourine); Charles De Chants (bass); Keith Robinson (drums, percussion), Pavel Cingl (violin)
