= TVGuide.co.uk =

British website

- Website: tvguide.co.uk
- Commercial: Yes
- Registration: Yes

TVGuide.co.uk is a British television listings website.

== History ==
The creators of TVGuide.co.uk envisioned people searching and watching television online, which the website cites as the reason they registered the domain name. In 2007, the brand's chief executive officer was Chetan Damani. The website was relaunched to include user-generated content and a new format: the television listings grid. It also enabled users to customise the guide to hide channels unavailable to them. Sister company Imano were commissioned to develop the changes. By 2008, TVGuide.co.uk had over one million unique users.

TVGuide.co.uk entered a partnership with TVCatchup to allow their users to watch television online without leaving their website. The brand later released their service as an application for Apple and Android devices. The application was originally designed by Imano. TVGuide.co.uk's use of deep linking has caused problems with British broadcasters. In March 2008, ITV and BBC hired lawyers to investigate the legality of TVGuide.co.uk linking directly to their video content. ITV later devised a strategy to prevent the website and similar websites from doing so, fearing profit loss. The broadcaster along with Channel 4 also altered their streaming services to block the deep linking.

The company has been represented by Monetise, which was later acquired by Glam Media. The website continued to receive advertising directing from Glam Media as well as Orange UK. In 2012, the website was investigated by the Advertising Standards Agency after it featured an advertisement for Durex. The watchdog concluded that it was "unlikely to cause serious or widespread offence". The website also revealed that only 4.6% of users were under eighteen years old.

The brand has begun a new project covering international television listings which operated at "yo.tv". In 2014, the website announced that it had acquired over three million monthly website users and downloads of their application had surpassed seven million. They also revealed that they gained more than five million unique users across their entire franchise.

Digitalbox purchased the assets of the site in 2022. In September 2023 the website was completely overhauled with the mobile web interface replacing the desktop site, which was no longer accessible.
