= The Dignity of the Nobodies =

- Spanish: La dignidad de los nadies
- Directed by: Fernando E. Solanas
- Written by: Fernando E. Solanas
- Starring: Fernando E. Solanas
- Release date: 2005
- Running time: 120 minutes
- Countries: Argentina; Brazil; Switzerland
- Language: Spanish
- Box office: $5,995

The Dignity of the Nobodies (Spanish: La dignidad de los nadies) is a 2005 Argentine documentary film directed by Fernando Solanas.

== Plot ==
The film focuses on the life of several Argentine persons after the December 2001 riots in Argentina. It highlights the aims and wishes of the outcasts and their hopes.
