= Tropical Malady =

- The French film poster
- Directed by: Apichatpong Weerasethakul
- Written by: Apichatpong Weerasethakul
- Produced by: Charles de Meaux; Axel Moebius; Pantham Thongsang; Christoph Thoke
- Starring: Sakda Kaewbuadee; Banlop Lomnoi; Sirivech Jareonchon; Udom Promma; Huai Deesom
- Cinematography: Jarin Pengpanitch; Vichit Tanapanitch; Jean-Louis Vialard
- Edited by: Lee Chatametikool; Jacopo Quadri (Editing Advisor)
- Production companies: Anna Sanders Films; TIFA; Downtown Pictures; Thoke Moebius Film Company; Kick the Machine Films; RAI Cinema; Fabrica Cinema
- Distributed by: GMM Pictures (Thailand); Ad Vitam Distribution (France); Istituto Luce (Italy)
- Release dates: 17 May 2004 (Cannes); 24 June 2004 (Thailand)
- Running time: 125 minutes
- Countries: Thailand; France; Germany; Italy
- Language: Thai

Tropical Malady (สัตว์ประหลาด RTGS: Satpralat; lit. "monster") is a 2004 Thai romantic psychological drama art film written and directed by Apichatpong Weerasethakul. The film is divided into two segments – the first is a romance between two men, and the second a mysterious tale about a soldier lost in the woods, bedeviled by the spirit of a shaman.

Tropical Malady won the Jury Prize at the 2004 Cannes Film Festival, and was the first Thai film to be in the main competition at Cannes. It is also the first Thai film to win a prize at one of the "Big Three" film festivals.

In 2022, Tropical Malady was ranked the 62nd greatest film of all time in the Sight & Sound directors' poll and 95th in their critics' poll. In 2016, it was ranked the 6th greatest LGBT film of all time in the British Film Institute poll. It is the 164th greatest film of all time as per the list-aggregation site They Shoot Pictures, Don't They?

== Plot ==
=== First Narrative ===
Keng (Banlop Lomnoi) is a soldier assigned to a post in a small city in rural Thailand. The troop's main duty is to investigate the mysterious slaying of cattle at local farms. While in the field one day, Keng briefly meets a villager named Tong (Sakda Kaewbuadee). Later, Keng sees Tong riding in a truck, they talk some more, and a romantic friendship soon develops between them.

Keng helps Tong with his job at an ice factory. One night while driving an ice delivery truck, they find a sick dog on the side of the road. They bring it to a veterinarian, but learn that it has cancer. Tong signs a form to allow it to undergo chemotherapy. Later, the two of them go to a movie theater.

While sitting together the next day, they are approached by an older woman who tells a story on how two poor farmers lost an opportunity to become rich. In the story, a young monk instructed them to collect rocks from a nearby pond. When the farmers brought the rocks back, those turned to silver and gold. When they greedily went back for more though, the silver and gold bars they had previously obtained turned into frogs. Keng, Tong, and the older woman spend the rest of the afternoon together, walking through a cave and meeting the woman's friends.

One night, Keng and Tong ride around the city on a motorcycle. While stopped on the side of the road, they share a brief romantic moment, only for Tong to abruptly wander off into the dark. Keng and his troops leave the village the next day. Some time later, Keng overhears some people saying a monster keeps killing their cattle.

=== Second Narrative ===
A soldier (Lomnoi) is sent alone into the woods to kill the spirit of a tiger shaman (Kaewbuadee). He follows its pawprints and waits by a tree once it gets dark. When he wakes up the next morning, he finds himself face to face with the shaman in human form. He chases and fights it, but is knocked unconscious and pushed down a steep slope.

When he wakes up, he still has his gun, but his radio and backpack are destroyed. A monkey tells the soldier he needs to kill the shaman; otherwise, the soldier will be devoured and will enter the shaman's ghost world. When it gets dark again, the soldier hears a sound in the distance and fires his gun in that direction, only to discover he killed a cow. The cow's spirit then rises from its body and walks towards a glowing tree. As the soldier walks away, the shaman (now in the form of a tiger) follows him.

The soldier loses his gun and begins walking on his hands and knees until he comes across the tiger shaman in a tree. After staring at each other for a while, the soldier says "I give you my spirit, my flesh, and my memories" as a graphical image of the tiger shaman absorbing him is shown. The soldier continues looking up at the tiger shaman as the wind picks up.

== Cast ==
- Banlop Lomnoi as Keng
- Sakda Kaewbuadee as Tong
- Huai Dessom
- Sirivech Jareonchon
- Udom Promma

== Release ==
In Thailand, the film screened for just 10 days at the Siam Theatre. The film was once available for streaming in North America through The Criterion Channel. Since 2020, the film has been removed from Criterion's lineup.

As of 2021, the film's distribution and sales rights in Thailand is currently owned by GDH 559 as a result of ownership of the GMM Pictures' catalog along with GTH titles as well. However it remains unclear if the director's own production company, Kick The Machine retained other rights.

== Reception ==
At the press screening at the 2004 Cannes Film Festival, several audience members left before the film was over and some of those who stayed until the end booed it. The film received generally poor reviews from such industry journals as Variety and The Hollywood Reporter, but then won the Jury Prize from the jury, headed by Quentin Tarantino. Deborah Young of Variety stated in May 2004, it had a "weakly structured story" and "its loosely connected scenes will sorely try the patience of most viewers". Manohla Dargis from The New York Times in October 2004 noted it was "unabashedly strange" and this is a "young filmmaker pushing at the limits of cinematic narrative with grace and a certain amount of puckish willfulness". Peter Bradshaw from The Guardian stated "masterpiece, cult classic or just barking mad?", it "makes me want to burst out laughing at its sheer audacity, its eccentricity, its unashamed aspiration to poetry" and it is "sumptuous and scary, and a brilliant adventure in structure and style". S. F. Said from The Telegraph in 2005 noted it was "weird yet utterly beguiling" and "something from another world".

The film has generally been met with favorable reviews since then.

Rotten Tomatoes considers 80% of 50 reviews to be positive with "Critics Consensus: Tropical Malady forsakes straight narrative lines and easy answers in favor of an utterly unique drama that leaves a lingering, dreamlike impact". Metacritic considers the film received "Universal Acclaim" with a weighted average score of 81/100 based on 16 critics' ratings.

Ed Gonzalez of Slant Magazine ranked Tropical Malady the third best film of 2005. In 2016, the movie ranked 52nd on an international critics' poll of the greatest films since 2000 by the BBC. In 2019, The Guardian ranked Tropical Malady 84th in its 100 Best Films of the 21st Century list.

It is currently registered as one of Thailand's national heritage films by the Thai Film Archive on its eight annual listing in 2018.

== Awards ==
- 2004 Cannes Film Festival - Jury Prize
- 2004 São Paulo International Film Festival - Critics Award
- 2005 Indianapolis International Film Festival - Special Jury Prize for Directing

== See also ==
- List of Thai films
- Nudity in film (East Asian cinema since 1929)
- Atsushi Nakajima (The film opens with a quote from "The Moon Over the Mountain" by Atsushi Nakajima.)
