= Pioneer One =

- Genre: Science fiction drama
- Starring: James Rich; Alexandra Blatt; Jack Haley; Guy Wegener; E. James Ford; Laura Graham; Laurence Cantor; Einar Gunn
- Country of origin: United States
- No. of seasons: 1
- No. of episodes: 6

Production
- Executive producers: Bracey Smith; Josh Bernhard; Ari Meisel
- Producer: Louis Meisel
- Running time: 30–40 minutes

Original release
- Release: June 16, 2010 – December 13, 2011

Pioneer One is a 2010 American web series produced by Josh Bernhard and Bracey Smith. It was funded purely through donations, and is the first series created for and released on BitTorrent networks.

== Background ==
Pioneer One was a serialized drama produced and distributed online through VODO and the DISCO network. Downloaded more than 3,730,000 times since May 2012 and winner for Best Drama Pilot at the 2010 New York Television Festival, the show was independently produced and financed by viewer donations. The pilot episode was filmed on a budget of $6,000, raised in advance using Kickstarter. The series itself was released under an Attribution-NonCommercial-ShareAlike Creative Commons license and was distributed for free in collaboration with VODO, as with Bernhard's previous independent film The Lionshare, over the Internet including peer-to-peer networks. Six episodes were produced. Production of the rest of the season was funded through direct donations from the fanbase.

== Pilot plot ==
A mysterious spaceship enters Earth's atmosphere, triggering a massive response from the American government. Since the ship has spread radiation over hundreds of miles of rural Montana, officials are quick to bring up the possibility of a terrorist attack, specifically the detonation of a dirty bomb, however, that idea is discarded subtly by the leading investigator, asking the rhetorical question "Who would launch an attack on Montana?". Debris is found in Canada, where an investigation of the crash discovers a live human being in a Soviet space suit. Federal agents working for the American Department of Homeland Security get involved, receiving permission from the Royal Canadian Mounted Police to operate in Canada. The man is in an unstable condition and his initial blood work shows signs of severe cancer, with his doctors proclaiming him too badly injured to transport. A note handwritten in Russian found at the crash site says that the man is the child of cosmonauts living at a base on Mars. Not believing the note and wanting to announce a Department of Homeland Security success to the press, the American DHS orders Agent Taylor to bring the man back to the United States as a suspected terrorist, despite his severe condition. Believing the note could be true, Taylor ignores his orders and destroys the permission from the RCMP, forcing his team to stay on site. He also brings in Dr. Walzer, an expert who has written several books about the possibility of human survival on Mars, to discuss the incident. At the end of the episode, a radio signal is heard and the screen display of a computer at Baikonur Cosmodrome is shown.

== Episodes ==
No.	Title	Directed by	Written by	Original release date
1	"Earthfall (Pilot)"	Bracey Smith	Josh Bernhard	June 16, 2010
An object from space spreads radiation over North America. Fearing terrorism, U.S. Homeland Security agents are dispatched to investigate and contain the damage. What they discover is a forgotten relic of the old Soviet space program, whose return to Earth will have implications for the entire world.
2	"The Man From Mars"	Bracey Smith	Josh Bernhard	December 15, 2010
Hired Mars expert Dr. Zachary Walzer (Jack Haley) fights to prove the validity of the Mars story. Can he convince the government to mount a crewed mission to Mars? Agent in charge Tom Taylor (James Rich) faces pressure from both the Canadians and his own superiors, and has to make a call.
3	"Alone in the Night"	Bracey Smith	Josh Bernhard	March 28, 2011
Now quarantined to the Calgary base for three days, Taylor and his team have bought time to get answers from the supposed Martian cosmonaut. But who can get him to talk?
4	"Triangular Diplomacy"	Bracey Smith	Josh Bernhard	April 28, 2011
As the media begins to question the story about the crashed satellite, Secretary McClellan (Einar Gunn) starts to play hardball with the Russians in pursuit of his own truth. But everything hinges on what Yuri (Aleksandr Evtushenko), the frightened boy at the center of it all, might have to say…
5	"Sea Change"	Bracey Smith	Josh Bernhard	October 5, 2011
When an unannounced visitor breaks into the Calgary base with just days left in the quarantine, tensions are higher than ever. The fate of Yuri and everyone on Tom Taylor’s team is about to be decided.
6	"War of the World"	Bracey Smith	Josh Bernhard	December 13, 2011
As Taylor prepares to address the media, he and his team learn the consequences of their actions.

== Cast ==
- James Rich as Tom Taylor
- Alexandra Blatt as Sofie Larson
- Aleksandr Evtushenko as Yuri
- Jack Haley as Dr. Zachary Walzer (a character based on Robert Zubrin)
  - Matthew Foster played Walzer in the original pilot
- Guy Wegener as Vernon
- E. James Ford as Dileo
- Laurence Cantor as Norton
- Einar Gunn as McClellan
- Laura Graham as Jane Campbell

== Reception ==
Within the first week of its initial release, the pilot episode had been downloaded 420,000 times, 170,000 more downloads than predicted. As of December 13, 2011, the Pioneer One series had collectively been downloaded over 3.5 million times through VODO and raised almost $100,000 in fan donations. It is difficult to estimate how many other downloads may have taken place through other means, such as the torrent being automatically added to the latest version of μTorrent.

Initial reviews were positive, with many reviewers praising the show for being surprisingly good for an independent project. For example, Download Squad described the first episode as "surpris[ing] ... I found myself wishing there were more episodes available when it finished."

The New York Television Festival selected Pioneer One as the "Best Drama Pilot" for their 2010 Independent Pilot Competition and the International Academy of Web Television nominated Pioneer One for "Best Drama" at the Inaugural IAWTV Awards.

== Funding ==
The pilot episode of the show was shot on a budget of $6,000 donated by people through the Kickstarter website. Because the project lacked funding by traditional means such as a TV station or DVD sales, funding had to come directly from the fanbase. On June 29, 2010, a minimum of $20,000 necessary for production on the next block of three episodes was raised. On February 11, 2011, the project announced that it would accept donations in Bitcoin.

== Production history ==
On October 6, 2010, local press reported that filming of the second episode was underway in Binghamton, New York.

On November 5, 2010, Rachel McLaughlin reported she has been working as Production Coordinator/Assistant director in Pioneer One and that three episodes were shot.

Episode three was released on March 28, 2011, and episode four was released on April 28. The last two episodes of Season One were aired between October and December 2011, with the episodes being produced in Binghamton, New York, New York City, and Long Island.

Six episodes, vlogs, and extras are on their YouTube channel.
