= Vladan Nikolic =

Serbian film director, screenwriter and producer (born 1965)

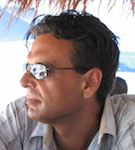
- Born: Belgrade, Serbia

Vladan Nikolic is a Serbian independent film director, screenwriter and film producer.

== Biography ==
Nikolic has taught film directing, production, and digital filmmaking classes at various universities, including New York University. He is Dean of the School of Media Studies at The New School.

His book "Independent Filmmaking and Digital Convergence - Transmedia and Beyond" was published by Routledge/Focal Press in 2017.

His awards include the TV Sarajevo Award and Zeta Film Award for Best Screenplay, Telluride Indiefest Best Film Award, and Tiburon International Film Festival Golden Reel Award. His feature film Love premiered at the Venice and Tribeca film festivals to critical acclaim and went on to win awards at film festivals in Geneva, Switzerland, and Barcelona, Spain. His subsequent film Zenith, incorporated an extensive transmedia project, expanding the film over multiple platforms, including theatrical, video, and online releases.

== Filmography ==
- Burn (2001) – writer, director, producer
- Going Under (2004) – producer
- Love (2005) – writer, director, producer
- Fire Under the Snow (2008) – producer
- Here and There (2009) – producer
- Zenith (2010) – writer, director, producer
- Allure (2014) – director, producer
- Bourek (2015) – writer, director
- Most Beautiful Island (2017) – consulting producer
- The Drummer (2021) – producer
- Everything That Will Happen Has Already Happened (2024) – writer, director
