= William Leroy =

American businessman

William Leroy

William Leroy (born in Amiens, France), also known as Billy Leroy, is an American reality television personality, actor, businessman and appraiser. He was the owner of store "Billy's Antiques and Props" on the Lower East Side of New York City. In 2023 he lives in Greenpoint Brooklyn.

== Biography ==
Leroy was born in France and grew up on the Upper East Side of Manhattan. In 1979, at the age of 19, Leroy graduated from the Williston Northampton School. Leroy stars in the Lower Eastside cult movie Dirty Old Town. He is married to Canadian American singer and songwriter Lorraine Leckie, who also appears in the movie.

Leroy's store, Billy's Antiques, was known for being the "last holdout of the old Bowery". Leroy is also known for his unique economic policy - accepting only euros during the plummeting value of the American dollar in 2008.

Leroy appeared regularly on the American docu-reality show Baggage Battles produced by The Travel Channel from 2012 to 2014 and shown in 23 countries.

Leroy starred in the movie Bourek. In 2021 Leroy stars as the host of the new Discovery series Billy Buys Brooklyn
