= List of Mandarin-language films =

This is a list of films with a significant amount of dialogue in the Mandarin Chinese language.

Film	Year	Country	Director	Genre
Fearless	2006	China; Hong Kong	Ronny Yu	Martial arts biopic
Crossed Lines	2007	China	Liu Yiwei; Lin Jinhe	Comedy
The Equation of Love and Death	2008	China	Cao Baoping	Drama
The Butterfly Lovers	2008	Hong Kong	Jingle Ma	Drama; Romance
City of Life and Death	2009	China	Lu Chuan	War
Mulan	2009	China	Jingle Ma	War; Martial arts
Aftershock	2010	China	Feng Xiaogang	Drama
14 Blades	2010	China; Hong Kong	Daniel Lee	Wuxia
Confucius	2010	China; Hong Kong	Hu Mei	Biopic
1911	2011	China; Hong Kong	Jackie Chan; Zhang Li	Historical drama
A Beautiful Life	2011	China; Hong Kong	Andrew Lau	Romance
The Flying Swords of Dragon Gate	2011	China; Hong Kong	Tsui Hark	Wuxia

== See also ==
- List of Chinese films
- List of Taiwanese films
