= Geneva International Film Festival =

- Location: Geneva, Switzerland
- Founded: 1995; 31 years ago
- Most recent: 2024
- Awards: Golden Reflection
- Directors: Audrey Olivier Muralt
- Hosted by: The GIFF Foundation
- Artistic director: Anaïs Emery
- Festival date: Opening: 31 October 2025; Closing: 9 November 2025
- Website: www.giff.ch

Current: 31st
- 32nd 30th

The Geneva International Film Festival (GIFF) (French: Festival international du film de Genève) is an annual film festival founded in 1995. Previously called the Geneva International Film Festival Tous Ecrans, it was renamed in July 2017 to the Geneva International Film Festival (GIFF). Every year for over ten days, the festival offers a series of experiences focused on image, sound, and new forms of narration. Offerings include screenings, interactive installations, VR workshops, conferences, and live performances. The GIFF includes four award competitions, one honor award and four convergent sections.

The festival also co-hosts the ‘Beyond Cinema: Swiss Digital Showcase’ event at the Cannes Film Festival as well as the Swiss Party at Austin's South by Southwest festival.

Emmanuel Cuénod was the Executive and Artistic Director of the Festival from 2013 until 2020; Anaïs Emery took over in January 2021. The 30th anniversary edition took place from 1 to 10 November 2024, while 31st edition will take place from 31 October to 9 November 2025.

== Sections & Awards ==
=== Competitions ===
- International Feature Competition: competition with 10 feature films, the winner wins the Reflet d'Or and a cash prize of CHF 10.000.
- International Series Competition: competition with 10 series, the winner wins the Reflet d'Or and a cash prize of CHF 10.000.
- International Immersive Experience Competition (VR, AR and MR): since 2016, 10 immersive experiences compete for the Reflet d'Or and a cash prize of CHF 10.000.
- Future is Sensible Competition: series, films and experiences that "question ethical choices and their impact on the future" compete for the Future is Sensible award and a cash prize of CHF 10.000.

=== Tributes & Honor awards ===
- Film & Beyond: an award for the lifetime achievements of an interdisciplinary artist. Former winners include: Apichatpong Weerasethakul (2016), Abel Ferrara (2017), Peter Greenaway (2018), Park Chan-wook (2019), Woodkid (2020), Riad Sattouf (2021), Alexandre Astier (2022) and Jean-Michel Jarre (2023).

=== Convergent sections & retrospectives (Out of Competition) ===
- Highlights: the section with all major events of the Festival.
- Pulsation: a section dedicated to young and upcoming artists.
- Pop TV: a section about the history of the medium of linear television.
- Tales of Swiss Innovation: a masterclass and a carte blanche is offered to a Swiss or Swiss-based personality or company that contributed to the advancement of the audiovisual industry.
