= Christoph Thoke =

German film and television producer (born 1960)

- Born: November 15, 1960 (age 66); Herford, West Germany
- Occupations: Film producer, television producer
- Years active: 1996–present
- Known for: There Is No Evil (2020); Lorna's Silence (2008); Tropical Malady (2004)
- Relatives: Heinrich Diestelmeier

Christoph Thoke (born November 15, 1960, in Herford, Germany) is a German film and television producer. He is the founder and owner of the Mainz-based production company Mogador Film, which specializes in international arthouse productions. As a producer or co-producer, he has been involved in more than 40 feature films that have collectively won more than 250 festival awards, including the Golden Bear for There Is No Evil (2020). Seven of his co-productions have been submitted by their countries as official entries for the Academy Award for Best International Feature Film.

He lives in Mainz and is a grandson of the German politician Heinrich Diestelmeier.

== Career ==
Thoke began his career as an on-air promotion producer for the German broadcaster RTL 2 and the German-French broadcaster Arte. From 1996 to 2002, he was part of the management at German production companies Bavaria Film, TaunusFilm, and CineMedia. At Taunusfilm, he oversaw international production activities, including the Los Angeles office, while at CineMedia, he was involved in film acquisitions such as What Women Want.

During this time, Thoke co-produced Little Senegal (2001), directed by Rachid Bouchareb. The film ran in competition at the Berlinale and was Algeria's official entry for Best Foreign Language Film at the 73rd Academy Awards. He also produced Lubov and Other Nightmares (Sundance 2002), Planet B: The Antman, and Detective Lovelorn and the Revenge of the Pharaoh (both Berlinale 2002).

In 2003, Thoke founded the production company Thoke + Moebius Film (TMF) with Axel Moebius. Through TMF, he co-produced several notable arthouse films, including Apichatpong Weerasethakul's Tropical Malady, which won the Jury Prize at the 2004 Cannes Film Festival, and Bruno Dumont's Twentynine Palms, which received regional funding in Hesse and premiered in competition at Venice 2003. He also co-produced The Buffalo Boy (Vietnam's Oscar entry) and The Wedding Chest (Kyrgyzstan's Oscar entry).

In 2008, Thoke founded his own production outfit, Mogador Film. Its first major project was Lorna's Silence, directed by the Dardenne brothers, which won Best Screenplay at the 2008 Cannes Film Festival. In 2020, he co-produced the Iranian drama There Is No Evil (directed by Mohammad Rasoulof), which won the Golden Bear at the 70th Berlin International Film Festival.

A 2025 profile by Filmhaus Frankfurt described Thoke's producing approach as that of an "ambassador of world cinema" and a "bridge builder." His continuous focus on international collaborations, particularly with Asian countries, was established during the early 2010s at markets like the Indian Film Bazaar. Together with the Frankfurt-based company Stoked Film (Sebastian Popp) and renowned Singaporean producer Jeremy Chua (Potocol), Thoke's Mogador Film is producing the Indian refugee drama The Clouds Woke No Clocks (directed by Aniket Dutta). The film received production funding of €120,000 from Hessen Film & Medien in 2025. In 2025, Thoke also co-produced the Bangladeshi short film Nishi: A Tea Girl, which won the Student Film Award at the Environmental Media Awards (EMA).

An example of his approach to bridging international cinema is the Bangladeshi-German co-production The Blind Girl and an Elephant (2026). After meeting the filmmakers at the Film Bazaar in India, Thoke joined director Ishtiyak Ahmad Zihad's debut feature as an associate producer. His involvement was instrumental in transforming the project into an international co-production and supporting its post-production phase leading up to its premiere at the Shanghai International Film Festival. At the festival, the film won the Best Cinematography award in the Asian New Talent competition. In November 2026, the film was selected for both debut competitions at the Camerimage International Film Festival in Toruń, Poland, entering the Directors' Debuts Competition as well as the Cinematographers' Debuts Competition. In November 2026, the film also received a Special Mention in the International Critics' Week section at the Cairo International Film Festival. In 2026, he co-produced another Bangladeshi project, the 15-minute short film Subal, directed by Nahid Hasan. The film was officially selected for the Asian Eye section of the Oscar-qualifying Bengaluru International Short Film Festival (BISFF). Notably, the project marked a family collaboration, with his son Yannic Thoke serving as associate producer.

His production The Tower of Strength (Obraz, 2024) enjoyed a successful international festival run in 2025. At its North American premiere at the San Diego International Film Festival, the film won the Audience Award. The film also won Best Screenplay at the Zaragoza International Film Festival and was selected for the "Awards Buzz" section at the 2026 Palm Springs International Film Festival, which highlights the world's best international feature films.

In total, films produced or co-produced by Thoke have been invited to more than 1,000 international film festivals and have won over 250 awards globally.

=== Academic roles ===
Thoke serves as an Honorary Professor at the film academy in Dhaka, Bangladesh, supporting local auteur cinema. For over a decade, he has acted as an expert evaluator for the Creative Europe MEDIA programme of the European Commission.

He frequently serves as a jury member at international film festivals across Europe and Asia. Besides the main jury at the Zagreb Film Festival (2015), which awarded its top prize to the Oscar-winning film Son of Saul, he has served on the jury at the Art Film Fest in Košice, Slovakia, the NDR Film Prize jury at the Nordic Film Days Lübeck, the Džada Film Festival in Montenegro, the LET'S CEE Film Festival in Austria, and the Tamil Nadu Film Festival in India. Additionally, he serves as a jury member for the German Film and Media Review (FBW) in Wiesbaden, an institution responsible for evaluating films for national certification, and has served on the jury for the Atelier de Tétouan at the Tétouan Mediterranean Film Festival in Morocco.

He has extensive experience as a project consultant and industry expert, appearing at events such as the pitch and feedback sessions at the Karlovy Vary International Film Festival. His tutoring background also includes work with the Producers Network at the Cannes Film Festival, MedaFilmsDevelopment in Marrakech, the Babylon Feature Film Project Development Workshop, and the Rotterdam Lab. Thoke is a member of the European Film Academy and the Deutsche Filmakademie (German Film Academy).

=== Industry Panels and Workshops ===
Beyond his jury and producing work, Thoke has regularly participated as a consultant, tutor, and panelist at international film markets and industry events. These include the Producers Network at the Cannes Film Festival, the Rotterdam Lab, MedaFilmsDevelopment in Marrakech, and the Babylon Feature Film Project Development Workshop. He is also active in academic training, serving as a mentor at the Eco Film Lab of the International Academy of Film and Media (IAFM).

Year	Event	Location	Role	Reference
2011	Indian Film Bazaar	Goa, India	Advisor / buyer	
c. 2012	Nepal Cine-Symposium	Kathmandu, Nepal	Lecturer / advisor	
2015	Pitch & Feedback Session, Karlovy Vary International Film Festival	Karlovy Vary, Czech Republic	Consultant	
2017	LET'S CEE Industry Days	Vienna, Austria	Panelist	
2021	India-UK Co-Production Panel, Cannes Film Festival	Cannes, France	Panelist	
ongoing	Creative Europe MEDIA Programme	Brussels, Belgium	Expert evaluator	

=== Jury Work ===
Year	Festival	Location	Role	Reference
2008	Dubai International Film Festival	Dubai, United Arab Emirates	Jury member	
2010	Durban International Film Festival	Durban, South Africa	Jury member	
2014	Nordic Film Days Lübeck (NDR Film Prize)	Lübeck, Germany	Jury member	
2015	Zagreb Film Festival	Zagreb, Croatia	Main jury	
2016	Mediteran Film Festival	Široki Brijeg, Bosnia and Herzegovina	Jury member	
2017	LET'S CEE Film Festival	Vienna, Austria	Jury member	
2018	Art Film Fest	Košice, Slovakia	Main jury	
2023	Atelier de Tétouan	Tétouan, Morocco	Jury member	
2024	Džada Film Festival	Montenegro	Jury member	
2024	Taunus Film Festival (Taunale)	Oberursel, Germany	Jury member	
2024	Tamil Nadu Film Festival	Tamil Nadu, India	Jury member	
2025	Transilvania International Film Festival	Cluj-Napoca, Romania	Jury member	
ongoing	German Film and Media Review (FBW)	Wiesbaden, Germany	Jury member	

== Oscar Submissions ==
To date, seven productions involving Thoke have been selected by their respective countries as official entries for the Academy Award for Best International Feature Film:

Year	Film Title	Country	Director	Role	Reference
2001	Little Senegal	Algeria	Rachid Bouchareb	Co-producer	
2004	Mùa len trâu (The Buffalo Boy)	Vietnam	Nguyễn Võ Nghiêm Minh	Co-producer	
2006	The Wedding Chest	Kyrgyzstan	Nurbek Egen	Co-producer	
2009	9:06	Slovenia	Igor Šterk	Producer	
2013	Of Horses and Men	Iceland	Benedikt Erlingsson	Co-producer	
2021	There Is No Evil	Iran	Mohammad Rasoulof	Co-producer	
2026	Obraz (The Tower of Strength)	Montenegro	Nikola Vukčević	Associate Producer	

== Selected filmography ==
Year	Title	Role	Notes
2001	Little Senegal	Co-producer	Directed by Rachid Bouchareb; Algeria's official Oscar entry.
2002	Lubov and Other Nightmares	Co-producer	Directed by Andrei Nekrassov; premiered at Sundance.
2002	Planet B: The Antman	Producer	Berlinale 2002, Perspektive Deutsches Kino.
2002	Detective Lovelorn and the Revenge of the Pharaoh	Producer	Berlinale 2002, Perspektive Deutsches Kino.
2003	Twentynine Palms	Co-producer	Directed by Bruno Dumont; Venice competition.
2004	Tropical Malady	Co-producer	Directed by Apichatpong Weerasethakul; Jury Prize at Cannes.
2004	The Buffalo Boy	Co-producer	Vietnam's official Oscar entry.
2004	The Red Colored Grey Truck	Producer	Road movie / Tragicomedy.
2005	Love	Executive Producer	Directed by Vladan Nikolic; Tribeca Film Festival.
2006	The Wedding Chest	Co-producer	Kyrgyzstan's official Oscar entry.
2008	Lorna's Silence	Co-producer	Directed by Jean-Pierre & Luc Dardenne; Best Screenplay, Cannes.
2008	Tears of April (Käsky)	Co-producer	Finnish historical drama directed by Aku Louhimies.
2009	9:06	Producer	Slovenian psychological drama; Slovenia's Oscar entry.
2010	Bedways	Producer	Directed by Rolf Peter Kahl; Panorama Special, Berlinale.
2012	Naked Harbour (Vuosaari)	Co-producer	Finnish ensemble drama directed by Aku Louhimies.
2012	Television	Co-producer	Bangladeshi-German feature film directed by Mostofa Sarwar Farooki.
2013	Of Horses and Men	Co-producer	Iceland's official Oscar entry.
2016	Women of the Weeping River	Co-producer	Philippine drama; internationally awarded.
2018	Erased	Associate Producer	Directed by Miha Mazzini; Slovenian social drama.
2019	Jolsobi	Executive Producer	Directed by Jaicheng Jai Dohutia.
2020	There Is No Evil	Co-producer	Directed by Mohammad Rasoulof; Golden Bear winner at Berlinale.
2021	My Mother's Girlfriend	Executive Producer	Indian LGBTQ+ short film.
2021	Stay Safe	Executive Producer	Slovenian experimental film directed by Miha Mazzini.
2022	Telma, el cine y el soldado	Associate Producer	Argentine documentary film directed by Brenda Taubin.
2024	Everything That Will Happen Has Already Happened	Associate Producer	Directed by Vladan Nikolic; premiered at Tallinn Black Nights.
2024	Saba	Associate Producer	Directed by Maksud Hossain; premiered at TIFF.
2024	Baghjan	Executive Producer	Indian drama film.
2024	Rador Pakhi (Morning Sunshine)	Creative Producer	Assamese drama film.
2024	The Tower of Strength (Obraz)	Associate Producer	Montenegro's official Oscar entry for 2026. Won Best Screenplay at the Zaragoza International Film Festival. Nominated for Best Balkan Film at the 2025 Sofia International Film Festival.
2025	Nishi: A Tea Girl	Co-producer	Bangladeshi short film; won Student Film Award at EMA.
2026	The Blind Girl and an Elephant	Associate Producer	Co-production between Bangladesh and Germany, directed by Ishtiyak Ahmad Zihad. Premiere at the Shanghai International Film Festival (SIFF). Selected for the Directors' Debuts Competition at Camerimage 2026. Special Mention (International Critics' Week) at the 2026 Cairo International Film Festival
2026	Subal	Co-producer	Bangladeshi short film directed by Nahid Hasan; premiered at the Oscar-qualifying Bengaluru International Short Film Festival (BISFF). His son Yannic Thoke served as associate producer.
2026	The Class of 1990 (Die Klasse von 1990)	Co-producer	German feature documentary directed by Sonja Hilberger and RP Kahl; co-production involving Mogador Film. World premiere at DOK Leipzig 2026 (Fokus Ost section), followed by a screening in the Spectrum section at FilmFestival Cottbus 2026.

== Selected awards ==
- 2004: Jury Prize at the Cannes Film Festival for Tropical Malady (as co-producer)
- 2008: Best Screenplay at the Cannes Film Festival for Lorna's Silence (as co-producer)
- 2020: Golden Bear at the Berlin International Film Festival for There Is No Evil (as co-producer)
- 2025: Best Screenplay at the Zaragoza International Film Festival for The Tower of Strength (Obraz, as associate producer)
- 2025: Audience Award at the San Diego International Film Festival for The Tower of Strength (Obraz, as associate producer)
- 2026: Special Mention (International Critics' Week) at the Cairo International Film Festival for The Blind Girl and an Elephant (as associate producer)
