= List of people on banknotes =

This is a list of people on the banknotes of different countries. The customary design of banknotes in most countries is a portrait of a notable citizen (living and/or deceased) on the front (or obverse) or on the back (or reverse) of the banknotes, unless the subject is featured on both sides.

== Afghanistan ==
(Afghanistan) Currency: Afghani (؋; Since 1925)

Person	Lifespan	Reason for honour	Currency	Denomination	Obverse or reverse	Years of circulation
Mohammed Zahir	1914–2007	King of Afghanistan (1933–1973)	Afghani	All (2-1,000 afghanis)	Obverse	1939–1946 (2-1,000 afghanis); 1948–1957 (2-1,000 afghanis); 1961–1963 (10-1,000 afghanis); 1967 (50-1,000 afghanis)
Mohammed Daoud Khan	1909–1978	1st President of Afghanistan (1973–1978)	Afghani	All (10-1,000 afghanis)	Obverse	1973–1977

== Albania ==
(Albania) Currency: Albanian gold franc (Fr.A.; 1926–1939)

Person	Lifespan	Reason for honour	Currency	Denomination	Obverse or reverse	Years of circulation
Ahmet Muhtar Zogolli	1895–1961	11th Prime Minister of Albania (1922–1924); 7th President of Albania (1925–1928); King of Albania (1928–1939)	Gold franc	Fr.A.100	Obverse	1926
George Castriot (Skanderbeg)	1405–1468	Lord of Albania (1443–1468)	Gold franc	All (5-500 francs)	Obverse	1945
Fan Noli	1882–1965	Priest and politician	Lek	100 Lekë	Obverse	1996–
Naim Frashëri	1846–1900	Poet and writer	Lek	200 Lekë	Obverse	1996–
Ismail Qemali	1844–1921	1st Head of State of Albania (1912); 1st Prime Minister of Albania (1912–1914); 1st Minister of Foreign Affairs (1912–1913)	Lek	500 Lekë	Obverse	1996–
Pjetër Bogdani	1630–1689	Writer and poet	Lek	1,000 Lekë	Obverse	1996–
Gentius	?-167 BC	Last Illyrian king of the Ardiaean State	Lek	2,000 Lekë	Obverse	2007–
Skanderbeg	1405–1468	Prince of Kastrioti (1443–1468)	Lek	5,000 Lekë	Obverse	1996–
Asdreni	1872–1947	Poet; known for writing the National Anthem of Albania Himni i Flamurit	Lek	10,000 Lekë	Obverse	2018–

== Angola ==
(Angola) Currencies: Angolar (pl: angolares; 1928–1958), Escudo (1914–1928; 1958–1977)

Person	Lifespan	Reason for honour	Currency	Denomination	Obverse or reverse	Years of circulation
Salvador Correia de Sá e Benevides	1602–1668	Soldier and politician	Angolar	All (20–500 angolares)	Obverse	1927–1944
António Óscar Fragoso Carmona	1869–1951	11th President of Portugal (1926–1951)	Angolar	5 angolares	Obverse	1947
António Barroso		Priest	Angolar	10 angolares	Obverse	1946
Salvador Correia de Sá e Benevides	1602–1668	Soldier and politician	Angolar	20 angolares	Obverse	1944–1951
Manuel Cerveira Pereira		8th Governor of Angola (1604–1607)	Angolar	50 angolares	Obverse	1944–1951
Francisco Inocencio de Sousa Coutinho			Angolar	100 angolares	Obverse	1946–1951
John (João) II	1455–1495	King of Portugal and the Algarves (November 11–15, 1477 (1st Reign); 1481–1495 (2nd Reign)	Angolar	1,000 angolares	Obverse	1946–1952
António Francisco Ferreira da Silva Porto	1817–1890	Trader and explorer	Escudo	20 escudos	Obverse	1956–1962
Henrique de Carvalho			Escudo	50 escudos	Obverse	1956–1962
Alexandre Alberto da Rocha de Serpa Pinto, Viscount of Serpa Pinto	1846–1900	Explorer and colonial administrator	Escudo	100 escudos	Obverse	1956–1962
Roberto Ivens	1850–1898	Explorer, colonial administrator and officer of the Portuguese Navy	Escudo	500 escudos	Obverse	1956–1962
Brito Capelo			Escudo	1,000 escudos	Obverse	1956–1962
Américo Tomás	1894–1987	13th President of Portugal (1958–1974) and the third and last president of the Estado Novo	Escudo	All (20-1,000 escudos)	Obverse	1962–1970
António Óscar Fragoso Carmona	1869–1951	11th President of Portugal (1926–1951)	Escudo	All (20-1,000 escudos)	Obverse	1972–1973
Luiz de Camões			Escudo	All (20-1,000 escudos)	Obverse	1973
Agostinho Neto and José Eduardo dos Santos	1922–1979 (Agostinho Neto); 1942–2022 (José Eduardo dos Santos)	President of Angola (1975–1979) (Agostinho Neto); President of Angola (1979–2017) (José Eduardo dos Santos)	Kwanza	All (1–2,000 kwanzas)	Obverse	1999–
Agostinho Neto and José Eduardo dos Santos	1922–1979 (Agostinho Neto); 1942–2022 (José Eduardo dos Santos)	President of Angola (1975–1979) (Agostinho Neto); President of Angola (1979–2017) (José Eduardo dos Santos)	Kwanza	All (5-5,000 kwanzas)	Obverse	2012– and 2017–
Agostinho Neto	1922–1979	President of Angola (1975–1979)	Kwanza	All (200-10,000 kwanzas)	Obverse	2020–

== Argentina ==
(Argentina) Currencies: Peso Moneda Nacional (m$n; 1881–1969)
Peso Ley ($L; 1970–1983)
Peso Argentino ($a; 1983–1985)
Austral (₳; 1985–1991)
Peso ($; 1992–present)

Person	Lifespan	Reason for honour	Currency	Denomination	Obverse or reverse	Years of circulation
Juan Bautista Alberdi	1810–1884	Political theorist and diplomat	Peso Argentino	$a5,000	obverse	1984–1987
Nicolás Avellaneda	1837–1885	President of Argentina (1874–1880)	Austral	₳500	obverse	1988–1992
Manuel Belgrano	1770–1820	Leader for independence from Spain	Peso Ley	$L1	obverse	1970–1981
Manuel Belgrano	1770–1820	Leader for independence from Spain	Peso Ley	$L5	obverse	1971–1981
Manuel Belgrano	1770–1820	Leader for independence from Spain	Peso Ley	$L10	obverse	1970–1981
Manuel Belgrano	1770–1820	Leader for independence from Spain	Peso Argentino	$a10,000	obverse	1984–1987
Miguel Juárez Celman	1844–1909	President of Argentina (1886–1890)	Austral	A5,000	obverse	1988–1992
José de San Martín	1778–1850	Leader for independence from Spain	Peso Moneda Nacional	m$n5	obverse	1935–1965
José de San Martín	1778–1850	Leader for independence from Spain	Peso Moneda Nacional	m$n10	obverse	1936–1965
José de San Martín	1778–1850	Leader for independence from Spain	Peso Moneda Nacional	m$n50	obverse	1936–1968
José de San Martín	1778–1850	Leader for independence from Spain	Peso Moneda Nacional	m$n50	obverse	1943–1968
José de San Martín	1778–1850	Leader for independence from Spain	Peso Moneda Nacional	m$n100	obverse	1936–1968
José de San Martín	1778–1850	Leader for independence from Spain	Peso Moneda Nacional	m$n100	obverse	1943–1968
José de San Martín	1778–1850	Leader for independence from Spain	Peso Moneda Nacional	m$n500	obverse	1944–1968
José de San Martín	1778–1850	Leader for independence from Spain	Peso Moneda Nacional	m$n500	obverse	1964–1968
José de San Martín	1778–1850	Leader for independence from Spain	Peso Moneda Nacional	m$n1,000	obverse	1944–1975
José de San Martín	1778–1850	Leader for independence from Spain	Peso Moneda Nacional	m$n5,000	obverse	1962–1975
José de San Martín	1778–1850	Leader for independence from Spain	Peso Moneda Nacional	m$n10,000	obverse	1961–1975
José de San Martín	1778–1850	Leader for independence from Spain	Peso Ley	$L50	obverse	1972–1981
José de San Martín	1778–1850	Leader for independence from Spain	Peso Ley	$L100	obverse	1971–1981
José de San Martín	1778–1850	Leader for independence from Spain	Peso Ley	$L500	obverse	1972–1984
José de San Martín	1778–1850	Leader for independence from Spain	Peso Ley	$L1,000	obverse	1973–1984
José de San Martín	1778–1850	Leader for independence from Spain	Peso Ley	$L5,000	obverse	1977–1984
José de San Martín	1778–1850	Leader for independence from Spain	Peso Ley	$L10,000	obverse	1976–1985
José de San Martín	1778–1850	Leader for independence from Spain	Peso Ley	$L50,000	obverse	1979–1985
José de San Martín	1778–1850	Leader for independence from Spain	Peso Ley	$L100,000	obverse	1979–1985
José de San Martín	1778–1850	Leader for independence from Spain	Peso Ley	$L500,000	obverse	1980–1985
José de San Martín	1778–1850	Leader for independence from Spain	Peso Ley	$L1,000,000	obverse	1981–1985
José de San Martín	1778–1850	Leader for independence from Spain	Peso Argentino	$a1	obverse	1983–1985
José de San Martín	1778–1850	Leader for independence from Spain	Peso Argentino	$a5	obverse	1983–1987
José de San Martín	1778–1850	Leader for independence from Spain	Peso Argentino	$a10	obverse	1983–1987
José de San Martín	1778–1850	Leader for independence from Spain	Peso Argentino	$a50	obverse	1983–1987
José de San Martín	1778–1850	Leader for independence from Spain	Peso Argentino	$a100	obverse	1983–1987
José de San Martín	1778–1850	Leader for independence from Spain	Peso Argentino	$a500	obverse	1984–1987
José de San Martín	1778–1850	Leader for independence from Spain	Peso Argentino	$a1,000	obverse	1983–1987
José de San Martín	1778–1850	Leader for independence from Spain	Austral	₳10,000	obverse	1989–1991
José de San Martín	1778–1850	Leader for independence from Spain	Austral	₳50,000	obverse	1989–1991
José de San Martín	1778–1850	Leader for independence from Spain	Austral	₳500,000	obverse	1990–1991
Justo José de Urquiza	1801–1870	President of Argentina (1854–1860)	Austral	₳5	obverse	1986–1991
Santiago Derqui	1809–1867	President of Argentina (1860–1861)	Austral	₳10	obverse	1985–1991
Bartolomé Mitre	1821–1906	President of Argentina (1862–1868)	Austral	₳50	obverse	1986–1991
Carlos Pellegrini	1846–1906	President of Argentina (1890–1892)	Austral	₳10,000	obverse	1989–1992
Carlos Pellegrini	1846–1906	President of Argentina (1890–1892)	Peso	$1	obverse	1992–????
Manuel Quintana	1835–1906	President of Argentina (1904–1906)	Austral	₳500,000	obverse	1990–1993
Bernardino Rivadavia	1780–1845	President of Argentina (1826–1827)	Austral	₳1	obverse	1985–1991
Julio Argentino Roca	1843–1914	President of Argentina (1880–1886) and (1898–1904)	Austral	₳1,000	obverse	1988–1992
Luis Sáenz Peña	1822–1907	President of Argentina (1892–1895)	Austral	₳50,000	obverse	1989–1993
Domingo Faustino Sarmiento	1811–1888	President of Argentina (1868–1874)	Austral	₳100	obverse	1985–1992
José Evaristo Uriburu	1831–1914	President of Argentina (1895–1898)	Austral	₳100,000	obverse	1990–1993
Manuel Belgrano	1770–1820	Economist, lawyer, politician, and military leader; took part in the Argentine Wars of Independence and created the Flag of Argentina	Peso	$10	Obverse (1999 and 2016); Reverse (2016)	1999– and 2016–
Juana Azurduy de Padilla	1780 or 1781–1862	Guerrilla military leader	Peso	$10	Reverse	2016–
Juan Manuel de Rosas	1793–1877	Politician and army officer who ruled Buenos Aires Province and briefly the Argentine Confederation	Peso	$20	Obverse	2000–
Domingo Sarmiento	1811–1888	7th President of Argentina (1868–1874)	Peso	$50	Obverse	1999–
Antonio Rivero	1808–?	Leading an unsuccessful resistance against the British in 1833	Peso	$50	Reverse	2015–
Julio Argentino Roca	1843–1914	14th President of Argentina (2 Terms: October 12, 1880 – October 12, 1886; October 12, 1898 – October 12, 1904)	Peso	$100	Obverse	1999–
María Eva Duarte de Perón	1919–1952	First Lady of Argentina (1946–1952)	Peso	$100	Obverse	2012–

== Armenia ==
(Armenia) Currency: Dram (since 1993)
Symbol:

Person	Lifespan	Reason for honor	Denomination	Obverse or reverse	Years of circulation
Aram Khachaturian	1903–1978	Composer	50	Obverse	1998–
Victor Ambartsumian	1908–1996	Scientist and one of the founders of theoretical astrophysics	100	Obverse	1998–
Alexander Tamanian	1878–1936	Architect	500	Obverse	1999–
Yeghishe Charents	1897–1937	Poet, writer and public activist	1,000	Obverse	1999–
Paruyr Sevak	1924–1971	Poet, translator and literary critic	1,000	Both	2018–
Tigran Petrosian	1929–1984	Grandmaster and World Chess Champion (1963–1969)	2,000	Both	2018–
Hovhannes Tumanyan	1869–1923	Writer and public activist	5,000	Obverse	1999–
William Saroyan	1908–1981	Armenian-American novelist, playwright and short story writer; awarded the Pulitzer Prize for Drama in 1940 and won an Academy Award for Best Story for the film adaptation of his novel The Human Comedy in 1943	5,000	Both	2018–
Avetik Isahakyan	1875–1957	Lyric writer, poet and public activist	10,000	Obverse	2003–
Soghomon Soghomonian (Komitas)	1869–1935	Priest, musicologist, composer, arranger, singer, and choirmaster; founder of Armenian national school of music; Recognized as one of the pioneers of ethnomusicology	10,000	Both	2018–
Martiros Saryan	1880–1972	Painter	20,000	Obverse	2007–
Ivan Aivazovsky	1817–1900	Painter	20,000	Both	2018–
Gregory the Illuminator and Tiridates III the Great	c.257-c.331 (Gregory the Illuminator); 250–300 (Tiridates III the Great)	Patron saint of Armenia and the first official head of the Armenian Apostolic Church (Gregory the Illuminator); King of Arsacid Armenia (287–330)	50,000	Reverse	2001– (commemorative)
Gregory the Illuminator	c.257-c.331	Patron saint of Armenia and the first official head of the Armenian Apostolic Church	50,000	Both	2018–
King Abgar V of Edessa	4 BC-7 AD and 13–50 AD	King of Osroene	100,000	Both	2009–

== Artsakh ==
Currencies: Artsakh dram

Person	Lifespan	Reason for honour	Currency	Denomination	Obverse or reverse	Years of circulation
Gregory the Illuminator	257–331	Patron saint of Armenia and the first official head of the Armenian Apostolic Church	Dram	2 dram	Obverse	2004-2024
John the Baptist	6 BC–30 AD	Religious figure in Christianity	Dram	2 dram	Reverse	2004-2024
Jesus Christ	4 BC–33 AD	Founder of Christianity	Dram	2 dram	Reverse	2004-2024
Jesus Christ	4 BC–33 AD	Founder of Christianity	Dram	10 dram	Obverse	2004-2024

== Australia ==
(Australia) Currencies: Pound (£A 1910–1966)
Dollar ($A, 1966–present)

Person	Lifespan	Reason for honour	Currency	Denomination	Obverse or reverse	Years of circulation
Joseph Banks	1743–1820	English botanist; introduced eucalyptus to the West	Dollar	$5	obverse	1967–1992
Caroline Chisholm	1808–1877	Humanitarian for women's immigrant welfare	Dollar	$5	reverse	1967–1992
James Cook	1728–1779	Explorer; the first European to visit the Australian east coast	Pound	£1	reverse	1953–1966
Elizabeth II	1926–2022	Queen of Australia (1952–2022)	Pound	£1	obverse	1953–1966
Elizabeth II	1926–2022	Queen of Australia (1952–2022)	Dollar	$1	obverse	1966–1984
William Farrer	1845–1906	Leading agronomist and wheat breeder	Dollar	$2	reverse	1966–1988
Matthew Flinders	1774–1814	Navigator and cartographer; author of A Voyage to Terra Australis	Pound	10/–	obverse	1953–1966
Howard Florey	1898–1968	Nobel Prize winner for work with penicillin (1945)	Dollar	$50	obverse	1973–1995
Sir John Franklin	1786–1847	Governor of Tasmania and explorer of the Arctic	Pound	£5	obverse	1953–1966
Lawrence Hargrave	1850–1915	Inventor aeronautical pioneer; invented the box kite (1893)	Dollar	$20	reverse	1966–1994
Hamilton Hume	1797–1873	First Australian-born explorer of Australia	Pound	£1	reverse	1953–1966
Henry Lawson	1867–1922	Poet and novelist	Dollar	$10	reverse	1966–1993
John Macarthur	1766–1834	Pioneer of the Australian wool industry	Dollar	$2	obverse	1966–1988
Douglas Mawson	1882–1958	Antarctic explorer and geologist	Dollar	$100	obverse	1984–1996
Arthur Phillip	1738–1814	Established the first European colony of Sydney, New South Wales	Pound	£10	obverse	1953–1966
Ian Clunies Ross	1899–1959	Scientist; leader in veterinary medicine	Dollar	$50	reverse	1973–1995
Charles Kingsford Smith	1897–1935	Aviator; first to fly across the Pacific in 1928	Dollar	$20	obverse	1966–1994
Charles Sturt	1795–1869	English explorer of Australia	Pound	£1	reverse	1953–1966
John Tebbutt	1834–1916	Astronomer; discoverer of the "Great Comet of 1861"	Dollar	$100	reverse	1984–1996
Edith Cowan	1861–1932	Suffragette; the first woman elected to the Parliament of Australia (1920–1924)	Australian dollar	$50	reverse	1995–
Elizabeth II*	1926–2022	Queen of Australia (1952–2022)	Australian dollar	$5	obverse	1992–
John Flynn	1880–1951	Founder of the Royal Flying Doctor Service (1928)	Australian dollar	$20	reverse	1994–
Mary Gilmore	1865–1962	poet and journalist	Australian dollar	$10	reverse	1993–
Nellie Melba	1861–1931	International opera soprano (1886–1926)	Australian dollar	$100	obverse	1996–
John Monash	1865–1931	General during World War I	Australian dollar	$100	reverse	1996–
Andrew Barton "Banjo" Paterson	1864–1941	Poet; author of "Waltzing Matilda" (1895) and "The Man from Snowy River" (1890)	Australian dollar	$10	obverse	1993–
Mary Reibey	1777–1855	Businesswoman	Australian dollar	$20	obverse	1994–
David Unaipon	1872–1967	Inventor and writer	Australian dollar	$50	obverse	1995–

== Austria ==
(Austria) Currencies: Schilling (S, 1947–2001)
Euro (€, 2002–present)

Person	Lifespan	Reason for honour	Currency	Denomination	Obverse or reverse	Years of circulation
Eugen von Böhm-Bawerk	1851–1914	economist	Schilling	S 100	obverse	1985–2001
Moritz Michael Daffinger	1790–1849	miniature painter and sculpture	Schilling	S 20	obverse	1988–2001
Sigmund Freud	1856–1939	co-founder of psychoanalytic school of psychology	Schilling	S 50	obverse	1987–2001
Karl Landsteiner	1868–1943	Nobel Prize winner	Schilling	S 1,000	both	1997–2001
Rosa Mayreder	1858–1938	feminist, painter, author	Schilling	S 500	obverse	1997–2001
Wolfgang Amadeus Mozart	1756–1791	classical composer and pianist	Schilling	S 5,000	obverse	1989–2001
Erwin Schrödinger	1887–1961	Nobel Prize winner	Schilling	S 1,000	obverse	1983–1997
Otto Wagner	1841–1918	architect	Schilling	S 500	obverse	1986–1997

== Azerbaijan ==
(Azerbaijan) Currencies: Second manat (m, 1992–2006)

Person	Lifespan	Reason for honour	Currency	Denomination	Obverse or reverse	Years of circulation
Nizami Gəncəvi	1141–1209	Poet	Second Azerbaijani manat	500m	Obverse	1993–2006
Məmməd Əmin Rəsulzadə	1884–1955	President of the Azerbaijani National Council (May 27 – December 7, 1918)	Second Azerbaijani manat	1,000m	Obverse	1993–2006

== The Bahamas ==
(The Bahamas) Currency: Dollar (since 1966)
Symbol: B$

Person	Lifespan	Reason for honor	Denomination	Obverse or reverse	Years of circulation
Elizabeth II	1926–2022	Queen of the United Kingdom (1952–2022) and Queen of the Bahamas (1973–2022)	B$1/2 (50 cents)	Obverse	1965–
Lynden Oscar Pindling	1930–2000	1st Prime Minister of the Bahamas (1973–1992)	B$1	Obverse	2001–
Elizabeth II	1926–2022	Queen of the United Kingdom (1952–2022) and Queen of the Bahamas (1973–2022)	B$3	Obverse	1984–
Cecil Wallace-Whitfield	1930–1990		B$5	Obverse	1995–
Elizabeth II	1926–2022	Queen of the United Kingdom (1952–2022) and Queen of the Bahamas (1973–2022)	B$10	Obverse	1984–
Stafford Lofthouse Sands	1913–1972	Minister of Finance of the Bahamas; "Father of Tourism" of the Bahamas	B$10	Obverse	2001–
Milo Boughton Butler	1906–1979	Governor-General of the Bahamas (1973–1979)	B$20	Obverse	1993–
Roland Theodore Symonette	1898–1980	1st Premier of the Bahamas (1964–1967)	B$50	Obverse	2000–
Elizabeth II	1926–2022	Queen of the United Kingdom (1952–2022) and Queen of the Bahamas (1973–2022)	B$100	Obverse	1974–
Arthur Dion Hanna	1928–2021	7th Governor-General of the Bahamas (2006–2012)	B$100	Obverse	2021–

== Bahrain ==
(Bahrain) Currency: Dinar (since 1965)
Symbol: BD

Person	Lifespan	Reason for honor	Denomination	Obverse or reverse	Years of circulation
Hamad ibn Isa al-Khalifa	1950–	King of Bahrain (2002–)	10 dinars	Obverse	2006–
Hamad ibn Isa al-Khalifa	1950–	King of Bahrain (2002–)	20 dinars	Obverse	2001–

== Bangladesh ==
(Bangladesh) Currency: Taka (since 1972)
Symbol: ৳

Person	Lifespan	Reason for honor	Denomination	Obverse or reverse	Years of circulation
Sheikh Mujibur Rahman	1920–1975	1st President of Bangladesh (1971–1972); 2nd Prime Minister of Bangladesh (1972–1975); 4th President of Bangladesh (January 25, 1975 – August 15, 1975)	৳2	Obverse	2011–
Sheikh Mujibur Rahman	1920–1975	1st President of Bangladesh (1971–1972); 2nd Prime Minister of Bangladesh (1972–1975); 4th President of Bangladesh (January 25, 1975 – August 15, 1975)	৳5	Obverse	2011–
Sheikh Mujibur Rahman	1920–1975	1st President of Bangladesh (1971–1972); 2nd Prime Minister of Bangladesh (1972–1975); 4th President of Bangladesh (January 25, 1975 – August 15, 1975)	৳10	Obverse	2011–
Sheikh Mujibur Rahman	1920–1975	1st President of Bangladesh (1971–1972); 2nd Prime Minister of Bangladesh (1972–1975); 4th President of Bangladesh (January 25, 1975 – August 15, 1975)	৳20	Obverse	2011–
Sheikh Mujibur Rahman	1920–1975	1st President of Bangladesh (1971–1972); 2nd Prime Minister of Bangladesh (1972–1975); 4th President of Bangladesh (January 25, 1975 – August 15, 1975)	৳50	Obverse	2011–
Sheikh Mujibur Rahman	1920–1975	1st President of Bangladesh (1971–1972); 2nd Prime Minister of Bangladesh (1972–1975); 4th President of Bangladesh (January 25, 1975 – August 15, 1975)	৳100	Obverse	1972–
Sheikh Mujibur Rahman	1920–1975	1st President of Bangladesh (1971–1972); 2nd Prime Minister of Bangladesh (1972–1975); 4th President of Bangladesh (January 25, 1975 – August 15, 1975)	৳200	Both	2020–
Sheikh Mujibur Rahman	1920–1975	1st President of Bangladesh (1971–1972); 2nd Prime Minister of Bangladesh (1972–1975); 4th President of Bangladesh (January 25, 1975 – August 15, 1975)	৳500	Obverse	2011–
Sheikh Mujibur Rahman	1920–1975	1st President of Bangladesh (1971–1972); 2nd Prime Minister of Bangladesh (1972–1975); 4th President of Bangladesh (January 25, 1975 – August 15, 1975)	৳1,000	Obverse	2011–

Person	Lifespan	Reason for honor	Denomination	Obverse or reverse	Years of circulation
Sheikh Hasina Wazed	1947–	Prime Minister of Bangladesh (2009–2024)	৳70	Reverse	2018– (commemorative)

== Barbados ==
(Barbados) Currency: Dollar (since 1935)
Symbol: $/Bds$

Person	Lifespan	Reason for honor	Denomination	Obverse or reverse	Years of circulation
John Redman Bovell	1855–1928	Scientist and agronomist credited with saving the sugar industry in Barbados	$2	Obverse	1980–
Frank Mortimer Maglinne Worrell	1924–1967	Cricket player and senator of Jamaica	$5	Obverse	1973–
Charles Duncan O'Neal	1879–1936	Physician and founder of the Democratic League	$10	Obverse	1973–
Samuel Jackman Prescod	1806–1871	Journalist, Politician, Judge; National Hero of Barbados	$20	Obverse	1973–
Errol Walton Barrow	1920–1987	1st Prime Minister of Barbados (1966–1976; 1986–1987)	$50	Obverse	1989–
Grantley Herbert Adams	1898–1971	1st Prime Minister of the West Indies Federation (1958–1962); 1st Premier of Barbados (1953–1958)	$100	Obverse	1973–

== Belgium ==
(Belgium) Currencies: Franc (fr., 1832–2001)
Euro (€, 2002–present)

Person	Lifespan	Reason for honour	Denomination	Obverse or reverse	Years of circulation
Albert I	1875-1934	King of the Belgians (1909-1934)	1 fr.	obverse	1920-1922
Albert I	1875-1934	King of the Belgians (1909-1934)	5 fr.	obverse	1922-1938
Albert I	1875-1934	King of the Belgians (1909-1934)	20 fr.	obverse	1921-1948
Albert I	1875-1934	King of the Belgians (1909-1934)	100 fr.	obverse	1921-1932
Albert I	1875-1934	King of the Belgians (1909-1934)	1,000 fr.	obverse	1922-1944
Albert I	1875-1934	King of the Belgians (1909-1934)	1,000 fr.	obverse	1944-1950
Albert I	1875-1934	King of the Belgians (1909-1934)	1,000 fr.	obverse	1950-1958
Albert II	1934–	King of the Belgians (1993–2013)	10,000 fr.	obverse	1997–2001
Baudoin I	1930-1993	King of the Belgians (1951-1993)	10,000 fr.	obverse	1992-1998
Baudoin I	1930-1993	King of the Belgians (1951-1993)	20 fr.	obverse	1964-1980
Baudoin I	1930-1993	King of the Belgians (1951-1993)	50 fr.	obverse	1966-1989
Hendrik Beyaert	1823-1894	architect	100 fr.	obverse	1978-1994
Elizabeth	1876-1965	Queen of the Belgians (1909-1934)	1 fr.	obverse	1920-1922
Elizabeth	1876-1965	Queen of the Belgians (1909-1934)	5 fr.	obverse	1922-1938
Elizabeth	1876-1965	Queen of the Belgians (1909-1934)	20 fr.	obverse	1921-1948
Elizabeth	1876-1965	Queen of the Belgians (1909-1934)	100 fr.	obverse	1921-1932
Elizabeth	1876-1965	Queen of the Belgians (1909-1934)	1,000 fr.	obverse	1922-1944
James Ensor	1860-1949	impressionist painter	100 fr.	obverse	1995-2001
Fabiola	1928-2014	Queen of the Belgians (1960-1993)	50 fr.	obverse	1966-1989
Fabiola	1928-2014	Queen of the Belgians (1960-1993)	10,000 fr.	obverse	1992-1998
Walthère Frère-Orban	1812-1896	Belgian Prime-Minister (1868-1870 & 1878-1884)	100 fr.	reverse	1952-1961
Hendrik Geeraert	1863-1925	Belgian hero in WW I	1,000 fr.	reverse	1950-1958
Guido Gezelle	1830-1899	Flemish impressionist poet and priest	5,000 fr.	obverse	1982-1992
André Grétry	1741-1813	composer of opéras comiques	1,000 fr.	obverse	1980-1997
Victor Horta	1861-1947	Art Nouveau architect	2,000 fr.	obverse	1994-2001
Leopold I	1790-1865	King of the Belgians (1831-1865)	20 fr.	obverse	1914-1920
Leopold I	1790-1865	King of the Belgians (1831-1865)	100 fr.	obverse	1914-1920
Leopold I	1790-1865	King of the Belgians (1831-1865)	100 fr.	obverse	1945-1951
Leopold I	1790-1865	King of the Belgians (1831-1865)	100 fr.	obverse	1952-1961
Leopold I	1790-1865	King of the Belgians (1831-1865)	1000 fr.	obverse	1914-1920
Leopold II	1835-1909	King of the Belgians (1865-1909)	500 fr.	obverse	1944-1951
Leopold II	1835-1909	King of the Belgians (1865-1909)	500 fr.	obverse	1952-1960
Roland de Lassus	1532-1594	Flemish composer	20 fr.	obverse	1950-1960
Lambert Lombard	1505-1566	Renaissance painter in Liège	100 fr.	obverse	1962-1975
Louise-Marie Queen
René Magritte	1898-1967	surrealist artist	500 fr.	obverse	1998-2001
Margaret of Austria	1480-1530	Governor of the Habsburg Netherlands	500 fr.	reverse	1961-1975
Gerardus Mercator	1512-1594	cartographer known for Mercator projection	1,000 fr	obverse	1961-1975
Constantin Meunier	1831-1905	painter, sculptor	500 fr.	obverse	1980-1998
Philippus de Monte	1521-1603	Flemish composer	20 fr.	reverse	1950-1960
Bernard van Orley	1491-1541	Flemish renaissance painter	500 fr.	obverse	1961-1975
Constant Permeke	1886-1952	Flemish expressionist painter	1,000 fr.	obverse	1997-2001
Paola	1937–	Queen of the Belgians (1993–2013)	10,000 fr.	obverse	1997-2001
Peter Paul Rubens
Adolphe Sax	1814-1894	musician, inventor of the saxophone	200 fr.	obverse	1995-2001
Andreas Vesalius	1514-1564	anatomist and physician	5,000 fr.	obverse	1971-1981

== Bhutan ==
(Bhutan) Currency: Ngultrum (since 1974)
Symbol: Nu

Person	Lifespan	Reason for honor	Denomination	Obverse or reverse	Years of circulation
Jigme Singye Wangchuck	1955–	King of Bhutan (1972–2006)	10 ngultrum	Obverse	2006–
Jigme Khesar Namgyel Wangchuck	1980–	King of Bhutan (2006–)	20 ngultrum	Obverse	2006–
Jigme Khesar Namgyel Wangchuck	1980–	King of Bhutan (2006–)	50 ngultrum	Obverse	2008–
Jigme Singye Wangchuck	1955–	King of Bhutan (1972–2006)	100 ngultrum	Obverse	2006–
Jetsun Pema	1990–	Queen consort of Bhutan (2011)	100 ngultrum	Obverse	2011– (commemorative)
Jigme Namgyel Wangchuck	2016–	Crown Prince of Bhutan (2016–)	100 ngultrum	Obverse	2017– (commemorative)
Ugyen Wangchuck	1862–1926	King of Bhutan (1907–1926)	500 ngultrum	Obverse	2006–
Jigme Khesar Namgyel Wangchuck	1980–	King of Bhutan (2006–)	1,000 ngultrum	Obverse	2008–

== Bolivia ==
(Bolivia) Currency: Boliviano (since 1987)
Symbol: Bs

Person	Lifespan	Reason for honor	Denomination	Obverse or reverse	Years of circulation
Cecilio Guzmán de Rojas	1899–1950	Painter	10 bolivianos	Obverse	1986–
José Santos Vargas			10 bolivianos	Obverse	2018–
Apiaguaiki Tumpa	1863–1892	Messianic leader of the Eastern Bolivian Guarani (Chiriguanos) people	10 bolivianos	Obverse	2018–
Eustaquio Méndez			10 bolivianos	Obverse	2018–
Pantaleón Dalence Jiménez			20 bolivianos	Obverse	1986–
Genoveva Ríos	1865	Defending the Flag of Bolivia during an invasion by Chile in 1879	20 bolivianos	Obverse	2018–
Tomás Katari	died in 1781	Quechua chief who, in claiming indigenous rights, led a popular uprising in Upper Peru (present-day Bolivia) in the 18th century	20 bolivianos	Obverse	2018–
Pedro Ignacio Muiba			20 bolivianos	Obverse	2018–
Melchor Pérez de Holguín			50 bolivianos	Obverse	1986–
José Manuel Baca ("Cañoto")			50 bolivianos	Obverse	2018–
Bruno Racua			50 bolivianos	Obverse	2018–
Pablo Zárate ("Willka")	died in 1905	Officer of the Bolivian Army; led one of the largest Indian rebellions in the history of Bolivia	50 bolivianos	Obverse	2018–
Gabriel René Moreno			100 bolivianos	Obverse	1986–
Franz Tamayo	1878–1956	Intellectual, writer, and politician	200 bolivianos	Obverse	1986–
Bartolina Sisa	c.1750s–1782	Aymara woman, an indigenous heroine and the wife of Túpac Katari	200 bolivianos	Obverse	2019–
Túpac Katari	c.1750s–1781	Aymara leader of a major insurrection in colonial-era Upper Peru (now Bolivia), laying siege to La Paz for six months	200 bolivianos	Obverse	2019–

== Bosnia and Herzegovina ==
(Bosnia and Herzegovina) Currency: Convertible mark (since 1998)
Symbol: KM

Person	Lifespan	Reason for honor	Denomination	Obverse or reverse	Years of circulation
Mak Dizdar	1917–1971	Poet	10 convertible marka	Obverse	1998– (Federation of Bosnia and Herzegovina issue)
Aleksa Šantić	1868–1924	Poet	10 convertible marka	Obverse	1998– (Republika Srpska issue)
Antun Branko Šimić	1898–1925	Poet	20 convertible marka	Obverse	1998– (Federation of Bosnia and Herzegovina issue)
Filip Višnjić	1767–1834	Poet and guslar (gulse player)	20 convertible marka	Obverse	1998– (Republika Srpska issue)
Musa Ćazim Ćatić	1878–1915	Poet	50 convertible marka	Obverse	1998– (Federation of Bosnia and Herzegovina issue)
Jovan Dučić	1871–1943	Poet	50 convertible marka	Obverse	1998– (Republika Srpska issue)
Nikola Šop	1904–1982	Poet	100 convertible marka	Obverse	1998– (Federation of Bosnia and Herzegovina issue)
Petar Kočić	1877–1916	Poet	100 convertible marka	Obverse	1998– (Republika Srpska issue)
Ivo Andrić	1892–1975	Novelist, short story writer and winner of the 1961 Nobel Prize in Literature	200 convertible marka	Obverse	2002–

== Botswana ==
(Botswana) Currency: Pula (since 1976)
Symbol: P

Person	Lifespan	Reason for honor	Denomination	Obverse or reverse	Years of circulation
Seretse Khama Ian Khama	1953–	4th President of Botswana (2008–2018)	10 pula	Obverse	2009–
Mokgweetsi Masisi	1962–	5th President of Botswana (2018–2024)	10 pula	Obverse	2020–
Kgalemang Tumedisco Motsete		Writer and composer of Botswana's national anthem	20 pula	Obverse	1999–
Seretse Goitsebeng Maphiri Khama	1921–1980	1st President of Botswana (1966–1980)	50 pula	Obverse	2000–
Sebele I, Bathoen I, and Khama III	1892–1911 (Sebele I); 1845–1910 (Bathoen I); ca. 1837–1923 (Khama III)	Kgosi (Chief) of the Kwena tribe (1892–1911) (Sebele I); Kgosi (Chief) of the Bamangwato people of Bechuanaland; responsible for making Bechuanaland a protectorate of Great Britain	100 pula	Obverse	2000–

== Brazil ==
(Brazil) Currencies: Cruzeiro (₢$, 1942–1967, Cr$, 1970–1986, 1990–1993)
Cruzeiro Novo (NCr$, 1967–1970)
Cruzado (Cz$, 1986–1989)
Cruzado Novo (NCz$1989 – 1990)
Cruzeiro Real (CR$1993 – 1994)

Person	Lifespan	Reason for honour	Currency	Denomination	Obverse or reverse	Years of circulation
Dom Pedro I	1798–1834	First emperor of Brazil (1822–1831)	Cruzeiro	Cr$5	obverse	1970–1984
Dom Pedro II	1825–1891	Emperor of Brazil (1831–1889)	Cruzeiro	Cr$10	obverse	1970–1984
Deodoro da Fonseca	1827–1892	1st President of Brazil (1889–1891)	Cruzeiro	Cr$50	obverse	1970–1984
Floriano Peixoto	1839–1895	President of Brazil (1891–1894)	Cruzeiro	Cr$100	obverse	1970–1984
Baron of Rio Branco	1845–1912	Defined the country's borders	Cruzeiro	Cr$1,000	obverse	1978–1989
Duke of Caxias	1803–1880	Army marshal	Cruzeiro	Cr$100	obverse	1981–1987
Dona Isabel	1846–1921	Princess of Brazil; emancipation of slaves	Cruzeiro	Cr$200	obverse	1981–1987
Castelo Branco	1897–1967	President of Brazil (1965–1967)	Cruzeiro	Cr$5,000	obverse	1981-1989
Rui Barbosa	1849–1923	Brazilian delegate in the Second Hague Conference	Cruzeiro; Cruzado	Cr$10,000; Cz$10	obverse	1984–1990
Oswaldo Cruz	1872–1917	Bacteriologist and public health officer	Cruzeiro; Cruzado	Cr$50,000; Cz$50	obverse	1984–1990
Juscelino Kubitschek	1902–1976	President of Brazil (1956–1961)	Cruzeiro; Cruzado	Cr$100,000; Cz$100	obverse	1985-1990
Heitor Villa-Lobos	1887–1959	Composer	Cruzado	Cz$500	obverse	1986–1990
Machado de Assis	1839–1908	Writer	Cruzado	Cz$1,000	obverse	1987–1990
Cândido Portinari	1903–1962	Neo-realist painter	Cruzado	Cz$5,000	obverse	1988–1990
Carlos Chagas	1879–1934	Bacteriologist, discoverer of the Chagas Disease	Cruzado	Cz$10,000	obverse	1988–1990
Carlos Drummond de Andrade	1902–1987	Writer	Cruzado Novo	NCz$50	obverse	1989–1992
Cecília Meireles	1901–1964	Poet	Cruzado Novo; Cruzeiro	NCz$100; Cr$100	obverse	1989–1992
Augusto Ruschi	1915–1986	Ecologist	Cruzado Novo; Cruzeiro	NCz$500; Cr$500	obverse	1990–1994
Cândido Rondon	1865-1958		Cruzeiro	Cr$1,000	obverse	1990–1994
Carlos Gomes	1836-1896		Cruzeiro	Cr$5,000	obverse	1990–1994
Vital Brazil	1865-1950		Cruzeiro	Cr$10,000	obverse	1991–1994
Câmara Cascudo	1898-1986		Cruzeiro	Cr$50,000	obverse	1991–1994
Mário de Andrade	1893-1945		Cruzeiro	Cr$500,000	obverse	1993–1994
Anísio Teixeira	1900–1971	Educational system reformer	Cruzeiro Real	CR$1,000	obverse	1993–1994

== Brunei ==
(Brunei) Currency: Dollar (since 1967)
Symbol: B$

Person	Lifespan	Reason for honor	Denomination	Obverse or reverse	Years of circulation
Hassanal Bolkiah	1946–	Sultan of Brunei (1967–)	1 ringgit/dollar	Obverse	1996–
Hassanal Bolkiah	1946–	Sultan of Brunei (1967–)	5 ringgit/dollars	Obverse	1996–
Hassanal Bolkiah	1946–	Sultan of Brunei (1967–)	10 ringgit/dollars	Obverse	1996–
Hassanal Bolkiah	1946–	Sultan of Brunei (1967–)	50 ringgit/dollars	Obverse	1996– (paper); 2004– (polymer)
Hassanal Bolkiah	1946–	Sultan of Brunei (1967–)	100 ringgit/dollars	Obverse	1996– (paper); 2004– (polymer)
Hassanal Bolkiah	1946–	Sultan of Brunei (1967–)	500 ringgit/dollars	Obverse	2000–
Omar Ali Saifuddien III	1914–1986	Sultan of Brunei (1950–1967)	500 ringgit/dollars	Obverse	2006–
Hassanal Bolkiah	1946–	Sultan of Brunei (1967–)	1000 ringgit/dollars	Obverse	2006–
Hassanal Bolkiah	1946–	Sultan of Brunei (1967–)	10,000 ringgit/dollars	Obverse	2006–

== Bulgaria ==
(Bulgaria) Currency: Lev (pl. Leva, лв; since 1881)

Person	Lifespan	Reason for honour	Currency	Denomination	Obverse or reverse	Years of circulation
Georgi Dimitrov	1882–1949	General Secretary of the Central Committee of the Bulgarian Communist Party (1946–1949); Chairman of the Council of Ministers of Bulgaria (1946–1949); Head of the International Policy Department of the Communist Party of the Soviet Union (1943–1945); General Secretary of the executive committee of the Communist International (1935–1943)	Lev	All (10–500 лв.)	Obverse	1951–1974
Desislava Sevastokratoritsa Ktitoritsa		13th-century Bulgarian noble	Lev	20 лв.	Obverse	1991
Hristo G. Danov	1828–1911	Bulgarian enlightener, teacher and book publisher	Lev	50 лв.	Obverse	1991
Zakhary Khristovich Dimitrov	1810–1853	Painter	Lev	100 лв.	Obverse	1991–1993
Ivan Minchov Vazov	1850–1921	Poet, novelist and playwright	Lev	200 лв.	Obverse	1992
Dobri Hristov	1875–1941	Composer	Lev	500 лв.	Obverse	1993
Vasil Levski	1837–1873	Revolutionary and national hero of Bulgaria	Lev	1,000 лв.	Obverse	1994–1997
Nikola Fichev (Kolyu Ficheto)	1800–1881	Architect, builder and sculptor	Lev	2,000 лв.	Obverse	1994–1996
Zahari Stoyanov	1850–1889	Revolutionary, writer and historian	Lev	5,000 лв.	Obverse	1996–1997
Vladimir Dimitrov—Maystora	1882–1960	Painter, draughtsman and teacher	Lev	10,000 лв.	Obverse	1996
Petar Beron	1799–1871	Educator	Lev	10,000 лв.	Obverse	1997
Saints Cyril and Methodius	826–869 (Saint Cryil); 815–885 (Saint Methodus)	Devising the Glagolitic alphabet, the first alphabet used to transcribe Old Church Slavonic	Lev	50,000 лв.	Obverse	1997
Person	Lifespan	Reason for honor		Denomination	Obverse or reverse	In Circulation since
Ivan Rilski	876–946	Patron saint of Bulgaria		1 lev	Obverse	1999–
Pasiy Hilendàrski	1722–1773	Saint of Bulgaria		2 leva	Obverse	1999–
Ivan Milev	1897–1927	Bulgarian painter and scenographer, founder of Bulgarian Secession		5 leva	Obverse	1999–
Petar Beron	1799–1871	Educator		10 leva	Obverse	1999–
Stefan Stambolov	1854–1895	9th Prime Minister of Bulgaria (1887–1894)		20 leva	Obverse	1999–
Pencho Slaveykov	1866–1912	Poet		50 leva	Obverse	1999–
Aleko Konstantinov	1863–1897	Writer		100 leva	Both	2003–

== Burma/Myanmar ==
(Myanmar) Currency: Kyat (K (singular), Ks. (pl); since 1852)

Person	Lifespan	Reason for honour	Currency	Denomination	Obverse or reverse	Years of circulation
Aung San	1915–1947	5th Premier of the British Crown Colony of Burma (1946–1947); President of the Anti-Fascist People's Freedom League (1945–1947)	Kyat	All (1–20 kyats)	Obverse	1965
Aung San	1915–1947	5th Premier of the British Crown Colony of Burma (1946–1947); President of the Anti-Fascist People's Freedom League (1945–1947)	Kyat	K 1/-, Ks 5/-, Ks 10/-, Ks 15/-, Ks 25/-, Ks 35/-, Ks 50/-, Ks 75/- and Ks 100/-	Obverse	1972–1986
Thakin Pho Hla Gyi			Kyat	Ks 45/-	Obverse	1987
Saya San	1876–1931	Leader of the 'Saya San Rebellion' of 1930–1932 in British Burma	Kyat	Ks 90/-	Obverse	1987

== Burundi ==
(Burundi) Currency: Franc (since 1916)
Symbol: FBu

Person	Lifespan	Reason for honor	Denomination	Obverse or reverse	In Circulation since
Prince Louis Rwagasore	1932–1961	Prime Minister of the Kingdom of Burundi (September 28, 1961 – October 13, 1961), Burundian nationalist and national hero	100 francs	Obverse	1964
Prince Louis Rwagasore and Melchior Ndadaye	1932–1961 (Prince Louis Rwagasore); 1953–1993 (Melchior Ndadaye)	Prime Minister of the Kingdom of Burundi (September 28, 1961 – October 13, 1961), Burundian nationalist and national hero (Prince Louis Rwagasore); President of Burundi (July 10, 1993 – October 21, 1993) (Melchior Ndadaye)	10,000 francs	Obverse	2004

== Cambodia ==
(Cambodia) Currency: Riel (since 1980)
Symbol: ៛

Person	Lifespan	Reason for honor	Denomination	Obverse or reverse	In Circulation since
Norodom Sihanouk	1922–2012	King of Cambodia (1941–1955; 1993–2005)	100 ៛	Obverse	2014
Norodom Sihamoni	1953–	King of Cambodia (2004–)	500 ៛	Obverse	2014
Norodom Sihanouk	1922–2012	King of Cambodia (1941–1955; 1993–2005)	1,000 ៛	Obverse	2012 (commemorative)
Norodom Sihanouk	1922–2012	King of Cambodia (1941–1955; 1993–2005)	2,000 ៛	Obverse	2013 (commemorative)
Norodom Sihanouk	1922–2012	King of Cambodia (1941–1955; 1993–2005)	5,000 ៛	Obverse	2001
Norodom Sihanouk	1922–2012	King of Cambodia (1941–1955; 1993–2005)	10,000 ៛	Obverse	2001
Norodom Sihamoni	1953–	King of Cambodia (2004–)	10,000 ៛	Obverse	2015
Norodom Sihamoni	1953–	King of Cambodia (2004–)	20,000 ៛	Obverse	2008
Norodom Sihanouk	1922–2012	King of Cambodia (1941–1955; 1993–2005)	30,000 ៛	Both	2021 (commemorative)
Hun Sen	1952–	Prime Minister of Cambodia (1984–)	30,000 ៛	Reverse	2021 (commemorative)
Norodom Sihanouk	1922–2012	King of Cambodia (1941–1955; 1993–2005)	50,000 ៛	Obverse	2001
Norodom Sihanouk	1922–2012	King of Cambodia (1941–1955; 1993–2005)	50,000 ៛	Obverse	2013
Norodom Sihanouk, Norodom Monineath and Norodom Sihamoni	1922–2012 (Norodom Sihanouk); 1936– (Norodom Monineath); 1953– (Norodom Sihamoni)	King of Cambodia (1941–1955; 1993–2005 (Norodom Sihanouk)); Queen-consort of Cambodia (1993–2004 (Norodom Monineath)); King of Cambodia (2004– (Norodom Sihamoni))	100,000 ៛	Both	2012 (commemorative)

== Cameroon ==
(Cameroon) Currency: Central African CFA franc (FCFA; since 1945)

Person	Lifespan	Reason for honour	Currency	Denomination	Obverse or reverse	Years of circulation
Ahmadou Babatoura Ahidjo	1924–1989	1st President of Cameroon (1960–1982)	Central African CFA franc	5,000 CFA francs	Obverse	1961
Ahmadou Babatoura Ahidjo	1924–1989	1st President of Cameroon (1960–1982)	Central African CFA franc	100, 5,000 and 10,000 CFA francs	Obverse	1962 (100 CFA francs); 1962 (5,000 CFA francs); 1972 (10,000 CFA francs)
Ahmadou Babatoura Ahidjo	1924–1989	1st President of Cameroon (1960–1982)	Central African CFA franc	5,000 and 10,000 CFA francs	Obverse	1974 (5,000 CFA francs); 1974–1981 (10,000 CFA francs)
Paul Biya	1933–	2nd President of Cameroon (1982–)	Central African CFA franc	1,000 CFA francs	Obverse	1985–1992

== Canada ==
(Canada) Currency: Dollar (Can$, 1867–Present)

Person	Lifespan	Reason for honour	Currency	Denomination	Obverse or reverse	Years of circulation
Robert Borden	1854–1937	8th Prime Minister (1911–1920)	dollar	Can$100	obverse	1976–1990
Robert Borden	1854–1937	8th Prime Minister (1911–1920)	dollar	Can$100	obverse	1990–2004
Edward	1894–1972	Prince of Wales (1910–1936)	dollar	Can$5	obverse	1935–1937
Elizabeth	1926–2022	Princess of York (1936–1952)	dollar	Can$20	obverse	1935–1937
Elizabeth II	1926–2022	Queen of Canada (1952–2022)	dollar	Can$1	obverse	1954–1974
Elizabeth II	1926–2022	Queen of Canada (1952–2022)	dollar	Can$2	obverse	1954–1975
Elizabeth II	1926–2022	Queen of Canada (1952–2022)	dollar	Can$2	obverse	1986–1996
Elizabeth II	1926–2022	Queen of Canada (1952–2022)	dollar	Can$5	obverse	1954–1972
Elizabeth II	1926–2022	Queen of Canada (1952–2022)	dollar	Can$10	obverse	1954–1971
Elizabeth II	1926–2022	Queen of Canada (1952–2022)	dollar	Can$20	obverse	1954–1969
Elizabeth II	1926–2022	Queen of Canada (1952–2022)	dollar	Can$20	obverse	1969–1993
Elizabeth II	1926–2022	Queen of Canada (1952–2022)	dollar	Can$20	obverse	1993–2004
Elizabeth II	1926–2022	Queen of Canada (1952–2022)	dollar	Can$50	obverse	1954–1975
Elizabeth II	1926–2022	Queen of Canada (1952–2022)	dollar	Can$100	obverse	1954–1976
Elizabeth II	1926–2022	Queen of Canada (1952–2022)	dollar	Can$1,000	obverse	1954–1992
Elizabeth II	1926–2022	Queen of Canada (1952–2022)	dollar	Can$1,000	obverse	1992–2000
George V	1865–1936	King of the United Kingdom and the British Dominions (1910–1936)	dollar	Can$1	obverse	1935–1936
Albert	1895–1952	Duke of York (1920–1936)	dollar	Can$50	obverse	1935–1937
George VI	1895–1952	King of Canada (1936–1952)	dollar	Can$1	obverse	1936–1954
George VI	1895–1952	King of Canada (1936–1952)	dollar	Can$2	obverse	1936–1954
George VI	1895–1952	King of Canada (1936–1952)	dollar	Can$5	obverse	1936–1954
George VI	1895–1952	King of Canada (1936–1952)	dollar	Can$10	obverse	1936–1954
George VI	1895–1952	King of Canada (1936–1952)	dollar	Can$20	obverse	1936–1954
George VI	1895–1952	King of Canada (1936–1952)	dollar	Can$50	obverse	1936–1954
Henry	1900–1974	Duke of Gloucester (1928–1974)	dollar	Can$100	obverse	1935–1937
William Lyon Mackenzie King	1874–1950	10th Prime Minister (1921–1926; 1926–1930; 1935–1948)	dollar	Can$50	obverse	1975–1989
William Lyon Mackenzie King	1874–1950	10th Prime Minister (1921–1926; 1926–1930; 1935–1948)	dollar	Can$50	obverse	1989–2004
Wilfrid Laurier	1841–1919	7th Prime Minister of Canada (1896–1911)	dollar	Can$5	obverse	1972–1986
Wilfrid Laurier	1841–1919	7th Prime Minister of Canada (1896–1911)	dollar	Can$5	obverse	1986–2001
Wilfrid Laurier	1841–1919	7th Prime Minister of Canada (1896–1911)	dollar	Can$1,000	obverse	1935–1937
Wilfrid Laurier	1841–1919	7th Prime Minister of Canada (1896–1911)	dollar	Can$1,000	obverse	1937–1954
John A. Macdonald	1815–1891	1st Prime Minister (1867–1873 and 1878–1891)	dollar	Can$10	obverse	1971–1989
John A. Macdonald	1815–1891	1st Prime Minister (1867–1873 and 1878–1891)	dollar	Can$10	obverse	1989–2000
John A. Macdonald	1815–1891	1st Prime Minister (1867–1873 and 1878–1891)	dollar	Can$100	obverse	1937–1954
John A. Macdonald	1815–1891	1st Prime Minister (1867–1873 and 1878–1891)	dollar	Can$500	obverse	1935–1937
Mary	1867–1953	Royal consort to George V (1910–1936)	dollar	Can$2	obverse	1935–1937
Mary	1897–1965	Princess Royal of Canada (1932–1965)	dollar	Can$10	obverse	1935–1937
Person	Lifespan	Reason for honor	Dollar	Denomination	Obverse or reverse	In Circulation since
Wilfrid Laurier*	1841–1919	7th Prime Minister of Canada (1896–1911)	Dollar	$5	Obverse	2013–
John A. Macdonald*	1815–1891	1st Prime Minister of Canada (1867–1873 and 1878–1891)	Dollar	$10	Obverse	2013–
George-Étienne Cartier	1814–1873	Premier of Canada East (1858–1862)	Dollar	$10	Obverse	2017– (commemorative)
Agnes Macphail	1890–1954	Member of the Ontario Provincial Parliament (1948–1951)	Dollar	$10	Obverse	2017– (commemorative)
James Gladstone	1887–1971	Senator for Lethbridge, Alberta (1958–1971)	Dollar	$10	Obverse	2017– (commemorative)
Viola Desmond	1914–1965	Challenging racial segregation at a cinema in New Glasgow, Nova Scotia in 1946	Dollar	$10	Obverse	2018–
Elizabeth II*§	1926–2022	Queen of Canada (1952–2022)	Dollar	$20	Obverse	2012–
William Lyon Mackenzie King*	1874–1950	10th Prime Minister of Canada (1921–1926, 1926–1930 and 1935–1948)	Dollar	$50	Obverse	2012–
Robert Borden*	1854–1937	8th Prime Minister of Canada (1911–1920)	Dollar	$100	Obverse	2011–

== Cape Verde ==
(Cape Verde) Currency: Escudo (since 1914)
Symbol:

Person	Lifespan	Reason for honor	Denomination	Obverse or reverse	Years of circulation
Henrique Teixeira de Sousa	1919–2006	Doctor and author	20000	Obverse	2014–
Baltasar Lopes da Silva	1907–1989	Writer, poet and linguist	50000	Obverse	1992–
Roberto Duarte Silva	1837–1889	Chemist	50000	Obverse	2007–
Jorge Barbosa	1902–1971	Poet	50000	Obverse	2015–
António Aurélio Gonçalves	1901–1984	Writer, critic, historian and professor	1,00000	Obverse	2007–
Codé di Dona	1940–2010	Musician and composer	1,00000	Obverse	2014–
Eugénio Tavares	1867–1930	Poet	2,00000	Obverse	1999–
Cesária Évora	1941–2011	Singer	2,00000	Obverse	2014–
Aristides Maria Pereira	1923–2011	1st President of Cape Verde (1975–1991)	5,00000	Obverse	2015–

== Central African Republic/Central African Empire ==
(Central African Republic) Currency: Central African CFA franc (FCFA; since 1945)

Person	Lifespan	Reason for honour	Currency	Denomination	Obverse or reverse	Years of circulation
Jean-Bédel Bokassa	1921–1996	2nd President of the Central African Republic (1966–1976); Emperor of the Central African Empire (1976–1979)	Central African CFA franc	All (500-10,000 francs)	Obverse	1974–1976 (Central African Republic); 1978–1979 (Central African Empire)

== Chad ==
(Chad) Currency: Central African CFA franc (FCFA; since 1945)

Person	Lifespan	Reason for honour	Currency	Denomination	Obverse or reverse	Years of circulation
François Tombalbaye (N'Garta Tombalbaye)	1918–1975	1st President of Chad (1960–1975)	Central African CFA franc	5,000 and 10,000 CFA francs	Obverse	1974 (5,000 CFA francs); 1971 (10,000 CFA francs)

== Chile ==
(Chile) Currency: Old Chilean peso ($; 1817–1960)
Chilean escudo (Eº; 1960–1975)

Person	Lifespan	Reason for honor	Currency	Denomination	Obverse or reverse	Years of circulation
Bernardo O'Higgins	1778–1842	Supreme Director of Chile (1817–1823); Commander-in-Chief of the Chilean Army (1819–1823); Chilean independence leader who freed Chile from Spanish rule in the Chilean War of Independence	Old Chilean peso	5 pesos (1/2 condor)	Obverse	1923–1947
Manuel Bulnes	1799–1866	President of Chile (1841–1851)	Old Chilean peso	10 pesos (1 condor)	Obverse	1931–1959
Pedro de Valdivia	1497–1553	1st Royal Governor of Chile (1540–1547); 3rd Royal Governor of Chile (1549–1553)	Old Chilean peso	20 pesos (2 condores)	Obverse	1939–1947
Aníbal Pinto	1825–1884	8th President of Chile (1876–1881)	Old Chilean peso	50 pesos (5 condores)	Obverse	1932–1959
Arturo Prat	1848–1879	Lawyer and naval officer of the Chilean Navy	Old Chilean peso	100 pesos (10 condores)	Obverse	1933–1958
Álvarez Jorge Montt			Old Chilean peso	500 pesos (50 condores)	Obverse	1933–1959
Manuel Blanco Encalada	1790–1876	Provisional President of Chile (July 9 – September 9, 1826)	Old Chilean peso	1,000 pesos (100 condores)	Obverse	1933–1959
Manuel A. Tocornal			Old Chilean peso	5,000 pesos (500 condores)	Obverse	1932–1959
José Manuel Balmaceda	1840–1891	10th President of Chile (1886–1891)	Old Chilean peso	10,000 pesos (1,000 condores)	Obverse	1932–1959
Arturo Alessandri	1868–1950	17th & 21st President of Chile (1920–1924 (17th); March 20 – October 1, 1925; 1932–1938 (21st)	Old Chilean peso	50,000 pesos (5,000 condores)	Obverse	1958–1959
Bernardo O'Higgins	1778–1842	Supreme Director of Chile (1817–1823); Commander-in-Chief of the Chilean Army (1819–1823); Chilean independence leader	Chilean escudo	Eº0.50 (50 Centésimos)	Obverse	1962–1975
Arturo Prat	1848–1879	Lawyer and naval officer of the Chilean Navy	Chilean escudo	Eº1	Obverse	1962–1975
Manuel Bulnes	1799–1866	President of Chile (1841–1851)	Chilean escudo	Eº5	Obverse	1962–1964
José Manuel Balmaceda	1840–1891	10th President of Chile (1886–1891)	Chilean escudo	Eº10	Obverse	1962–1975
Arturo Alessandri	1868–1950	17th & 21st President of Chile (1920–1924 (17th); March 20 – October 1, 1925; 1932–1938 (21st)	Chilean escudo	Eº50	Obverse	1962–1975
Manuel Rengifo	1793–1845	Chilean politician	Chilean escudo	Eº100	Obverse	1962–1975
José Miguel Carrera	1785–1821	President of the First Chilean Governing Council (1811–1814)	Chilean escudo	Eº1,000 and Eº5,000	Obverse	1973–1975
Bernardo O'Higgins	1778–1842	Supreme Director of Chile (1817–1823); Commander-in-Chief of the Chilean Army (1819–1823); Chilean independence leader who freed Chile from Spanish rule in the Chilean War of Independence	Chilean escudo	Eº10,000	Obverse	1974
Ignacio Carrera Pinto	1848–1882	Hero of the War of the Pacific	Peso	1,000 pesos	Obverse	1978–
Manuel Xavier Rodríguez Erdoíza	1785–1818	Lawyer and guerrilla fighter; founder of Chile	Peso	2,000 pesos	Obverse	1997–
Gabriela Mistral	1889–1957	Poet-diplomat, educator and feminist; received the Nobel Prize in Literature	Peso	5,000 pesos	Obverse	1981–
Arturo Prat	1848–1879	Lawyer and Navy officer	Peso	10,000 pesos	Obverse	1989–
Andrés Bello	1781–1865	Humanist, diplomat, poet, legislator, philosopher, educator and philologist	Peso	20,000 pesos	Obverse	1998–

== China ==
(China) Currency: Renminbi (¥; since 1948)

Person	Lifespan	Reason for honour	Currency	Denomination	Obverse or reverse	Years of circulation
Mao Zedong	1893–1976	1st President (1954–1959)	Renminbi	¥100	obverse	1992–1999
Zhou Enlai	1898–1976	1st Premier (1949–1976); 1st Foreign Minister (1949–1958)	Renminbi	¥100	obverse	1992–1999
Liu Shaoqi	1898–1969	2nd President (1959–1968)	Renminbi	¥100	obverse	1992–1999
Zhu De	1886–1976	Founder of the Chinese Red Army	Renminbi	¥100	obverse	1992–1999

Person	Lifespan	Reason for honour	Currency	Denomination	Obverse or reverse	Years of circulation
Liang Jun	1930–2020	Became China's first female tractor driver	Renminbi	¥1	Obverse	1969–1996
Mao Zedong*	1893–1976	1st Chairman of the Central Committee of the Chinese Communist Party (1945–1976); 1st Chairman of the Central Politburo of the Chinese Communist Party (1943–1969); Chairman of the Chinese Communist Party's Central Military Commission (August 23, 1945 – 1949; September 8, 1954 – September 9, 1976); 1st Chairman of the National Committee of the CPPCC (1949–1954); Honorary Chairman (1954–1976); 1st Chairman of the People's Republic of China (1954–1959); Member of the National People's Congress (1954–1959; 1964–1976)	Renminbi	¥1	obverse	2004–
Mao Zedong*	1893–1976	1st Chairman of the Central Committee of the Chinese Communist Party (1945–1976); 1st Chairman of the Central Politburo of the Chinese Communist Party (1943–1969); Chairman of the Chinese Communist Party's Central Military Commission (August 23, 1945 – 1949; September 8, 1954 – September 9, 1976); 1st Chairman of the National Committee of the CPPCC (1949–1954); Honorary Chairman (1954–1976); 1st Chairman of the People's Republic of China (1954–1959); Member of the National People's Congress (1954–1959; 1964–1976)	Renminbi	¥5	obverse	2002–
Mao Zedong*	1893–1976	1st Chairman of the Central Committee of the Chinese Communist Party (1945–1976); 1st Chairman of the Central Politburo of the Chinese Communist Party (1943–1969); Chairman of the Chinese Communist Party's Central Military Commission (August 23, 1945 – 1949; September 8, 1954 – September 9, 1976); 1st Chairman of the National Committee of the CPPCC (1949–1954); Honorary Chairman (1954–1976); 1st Chairman of the People's Republic of China (1954–1959); Member of the National People's Congress (1954–1959; 1964–1976)	Renminbi	¥10	obverse	2001–
Mao Zedong*	1893–1976	1st Chairman of the Central Committee of the Chinese Communist Party (1945–1976); 1st Chairman of the Central Politburo of the Chinese Communist Party (1943–1969); Chairman of the Chinese Communist Party's Central Military Commission (August 23, 1945 – 1949; September 8, 1954 – September 9, 1976); 1st Chairman of the National Committee of the CPPCC (1949–1954); Honorary Chairman (1954–1976); 1st Chairman of the People's Republic of China (1954–1959); Member of the National People's Congress (1954–1959; 1964–1976)	Renminbi	¥20	obverse	2000–
Mao Zedong*	1893–1976	1st Chairman of the Central Committee of the Chinese Communist Party (1945–1976); 1st Chairman of the Central Politburo of the Chinese Communist Party (1943–1969); Chairman of the Chinese Communist Party's Central Military Commission (August 23, 1945 – 1949; September 8, 1954 – September 9, 1976); 1st Chairman of the National Committee of the CPPCC (1949–1954); Honorary Chairman (1954–1976); 1st Chairman of the People's Republic of China (1954–1959); Member of the National People's Congress (1954–1959; 1964–1976)	Renminbi	¥50	obverse	2001–
Mao Zedong*	1893–1976	1st Chairman of the Central Committee of the Chinese Communist Party (1945–1976); 1st Chairman of the Central Politburo of the Chinese Communist Party (1943–1969); Chairman of the Chinese Communist Party's Central Military Commission (August 23, 1945 – 1949; September 8, 1954 – September 9, 1976); 1st Chairman of the National Committee of the CPPCC (1949–1954); Honorary Chairman (1954–1976); 1st Chairman of the People's Republic of China (1954–1959); Member of the National People's Congress (1954–1959; 1964–1976)	Renminbi	¥100	obverse	1999–

== Colombia ==
(Colombia) Currency: Peso (since 1837)
Symbol: $

Person	Lifespan	Reason for honor	Denomination	Obverse or reverse	Years of circulation
Jorge Eliécer Gaitán	1903–1948	5th Minister of Labour, Health and Social Welfare of Colombia (1943–1944); Minister of National Education of Colombia (1940–1941); Mayor of Bogotá (1936–1937)	1,000 pesos	Both	2001–
Francisco José de Paula Santander y Omaña	1792–1840	4th President of the Republic of the New Granada (1832–1837); 2nd Vice President of the Republic of Colombia (1821–1827)	2,000 pesos	Obverse	1996–
Débora Arango Pérez	1907–2005	Artist	2,000 pesos	Obverse	2016–
José Asunción Silva	1865–1896	Poet	5,000 pesos	Obverse	1997– and 2015–
Policarpa Salavarrieta	1795–1817	Seamstress and spy	10,000 pesos	Obverse	1995–
Virginia Gutiérrez de Pineda	1921–1999	Anthropologist	10,000 pesos	Obverse	2016–
Julio Garavito Armero	1865–1920	Astronomer	20,000 pesos	Obverse	1996–
Alfonso López Michelsen	1913–2007	24th President of Colombia (1974–1978)	20,000 pesos	Obverse	2015–
Jorge Isaacs Ferrer	1837–1895	Writer, politician and soldier	50,000 pesos	Obverse	2000–
Gabriel García Márquez	1927–2014	Novelist, short-story writer, screenwriter and journalist	50,000 pesos	Obverse	2015–
Carlos Lleras Restrepo	1908–1994	22nd President of Colombia (1966–1970)	100,000 pesos	Obverse	2015–

== Comoros ==
(Comoros) Currency: Franc (since 1920)
Symbol: CF

Person	Lifespan	Reason for honor	Denomination	Obverse or reverse	Years of circulation
Saïd Mohamed Ben Chech Abdallah Cheikh	1904–1970	Head of the Government of Comoros (1962–1970)	5,000 francs	Obverse	1976–
Al-Habib Seyyid Omar Bin Sumeit			10,000 francs	Obverse	1997–

== Confederate States of America ==
(Confederate States of America) Currency: Confederate States dollar (US$; 1861–1865)

Person	Lifespan	Reason for honour	Currency	Denomination	Obverse or reverse	Years of circulation
George Washington	1732–1799	1st President of the United States (1789–1797); Commander-in-Chief of the Continental Army; Founding Father of the United States	Confederate States dollar	$50 and $100	Obverse	July 29 – October 22, 1861 ($50 and $100); August 25 – September 23, 1861 ($50)
John Caldwell Calhoun	1782–1850	7th Vice President of the United States (1825–1832)	Confederate States dollar	$1,000	Obverse	April 5 – June 21, 1861
Andrew Jackson	1767–1845	7th President of the United States (1829–1837)	Confederate States dollar	$1,000	Obverse	April 5 – June 21, 1861
Jefferson Davis	1808–1889	President of the Confederate States (1862–1865)	Confederate States dollar	$50	Obverse	April 17 – December 10, 1862
Alexander Hamilton Stephens	1812–1883	Vice President of the Confederate States (1862–1865)	Confederate States dollar	$20	Obverse	June 21 – December 8, 1862 (Version 1); June 28 – November 15, 1862 (Version 2)
John Elliott Ward	1814–1902	Politician and diplomat	Confederate States dollar	$10	Obverse	November 15 – December 30, 1861
Robert Mercer Taliaferro Hunter	1809–1887	President pro tempore of the Confederate States Senate (1862–1865); Confederate States Senator from Virginia (1862–1865); 2nd Confederate States Secretary of State (1861–1862)	Confederate States dollar	$10	Obverse	February 20 – December 8, 1862 (Version 1); May 12 – August 9, 1862 (Version 2); July 12 – December 8, 1862 (Version 3); June 14, 1862 – January 3, 1863 (Version 4)
Christopher Gustavus Memminger	1803–1888	1st Confederate States Secretary of the Treasury (1861–1864)	Confederate States dollar	$5	Obverse	March 13 – June 19, 1862 (Version 1); May 12 – December 8, 1862 (Version 2); April 7 – September 13, 1862 (Version 3)
Judah Philip Benjamin	1811–1884	3rd Confederate States Secretary of State (1862–1865); 2nd Confederate States Secretary of War (1861–1862); 1st Confederate States Attorney General (February 25 – November 15, 1861)	Confederate States dollar	$2	Obverse	
John Caldwell Calhoun	1782–1850	7th Vice President of the United States (1825–1832)	Confederate States dollar	$100	Obverse	
Lucy Pickens	1832–1899	Socialite	Confederate States dollar	$1, $100	Obverse	
George Wythe Randolph	1818–1867	3rd Confederate States Secretary of War (March 24 – November 15, 1862)	Confederate States dollar	$100	Obverse	
Clement Claiborne Clay	1816–1882	Confederate States Senator from Alabama (1862–1864)	Confederate States dollar	$1	Obverse	
Thomas Jonathan "Stonewall" Jackson	1824–1863	General of the Confederate States Army	Confederate States dollar	$500	Obverse	

== Congo, Democratic Republic (Congo-Kinshasa) ==
(Democratic Republic of the Congo) Currency: Franc (since 1997)
Symbol: FC

Person	Lifespan	Reason for honor	Denomination	Obverse or reverse	Years of circulation
Patrice Lumumba	1925–1961	Prime Minister of Congo-Léopoldville (June 24 – September 14, 1960)	1 franc	Reverse	1997–

== Costa Rica ==
(Costa Rica) Currency: Colón (since 1896)
Symbol: ₡

Person	Lifespan	Reason for honor	Denomination	Obverse or reverse	Years of circulation
Braulio Carrillo Colina	1800–1845	Head of State (1st term: 1835–1837; 2nd term: 1838–1842)	₡1000	obverse	2009–
Mauro Fernández Acuña	1843–1905	Politician and lawyer	₡2000	obverse	2009–
Alfredo González Flores	1877–1962	President of Costa Rica (1914–1917)	₡5000	obverse	2009–
José Figueres Ferrer	1906–1990	President of Costa Rica (1st term (32nd President of Costa Rica): 1948–1949; 2nd term (34th President of Costa Rica): 1953–1958; 3rd term (38th President of Costa Rica): 1970–1974	₡10,000	obverse	2009–
Carmen Lyra (born Maria Isabel Carvajal)	1887–1949	Costa Rican writer and member of the Communist Party of Costa Rica	₡20,000	obverse	2009–
Romualdo Ricardo Jiménez Oreamuno	1859–1945	President of Costa Rica (1st term: 1910–1914; 2nd term: 1924–1928; 3rd term: 1932–1936)	₡50,000	obverse	2009–

== Croatia ==
(Croatia) Currency: Kuna (kn; 1994–2023)

Person	Lifespan	Reason for honour	Currency	Denomination	Obverse or reverse	Years of circulation
Juraj Dobrila	1812–1882	Catholic bishop; public supporter of Croatian language and culture	Kuna	10 kn	obverse	1994-2023
Fran Krsto Frankopan	1643–1671	Statesman and poet; died for Croatian liberty	Kuna	5 kn	obverse	1994-2023
Ivan Gundulić	1589–1638	Baroque poet	Kuna	50 kn	obverse	1994-2023
Josip Jelačić	1801–1859	Ban (1848–1859); abolished serfdom	Kuna	20 kn	obverse	1994-2023
Marko Marulić	1450–1524	Poet and humanist	Kuna	500 kn	obverse	1994-2023
Ivan Mažuranić	1814–1890	Ban (1873–1880); modernized economy and education	Kuna	100 kn	obverse	1994-2023
Stjepan Radić	1871–1928	Founder of the Croatian Peasant Party (1905)	Kuna	200 kn	obverse	1994-2023
Ante Starčević	1823–1896	Politician and writer	Kuna	1,000 kn	obverse	1994-2023
Tomislav	???-928	1st King of Croatia (925–928)	Kuna	1,000 kn	reverse	1994-2023
Petar Zrinski	1621–1671	Statesman and poet; died for Croatian liberty	Kuna	5 kn	obverse	1994-2023

== Cuba ==
(Cuba) Currency: Cuban peso (since 1857)
Symbol: $

Person	Lifespan	Reason for honor	Denomination	Obverse or reverse	Years of circulation
José Martí and Fidel Castro	1853–1895 (José Martí); 1926–2016 (Fidel Castro)	National hero of Cuba, poet, an essayist, a journalist, a revolutionary philosopher, a translator, a professor, a publisher, and a political theorist (José Martí); Prime Minister (1959–1976), President of Cuba (1976–2008) (Fidel Castro)	1 peso	both	2001–
Ernesto "Che" Guevara	1928–1967	Marxist revolutionary, physician, author, guerrilla leader, diplomat, and military theorist	3 pesos	both	2004–
Antonio Maceo Grajales	1845–1895	Lt. General	5 pesos	both	1997–
Máximo Gómez y Báez	1836–1905	Major General in the Ten Years' War (1868–1878) and Commander in Cuba's War of Independence (1895–1898)	10 pesos	obverse	1997–
Camilo Cienfuegos	1932–1959	Cuban revolutionary	20 pesos	obverse	1998–
Calixto García Iñiguez	1839–1898	General in three uprisings: part of the Cuban War of Independence, the Ten Years' War, the Little War and the War of 1895	50 pesos	obverse	1998–
Carlos Manuel de Céspedes	1819–1874	Cuban planter who freed his slaves and made the declaration of Cuban independence	100 pesos	obverse	2001–
Frank País	1934–1957	Cuban revolutionary who campaigned for the overthrow of Fulgencio Batista's government in Cuba	200 pesos	obverse	2010– (2015–)
Ignacio Agramonte	1841–1873	Cuban revolutionary	500 pesos	obverse	2010– (2015–)
Julio Antonio Mella McPartland	1903–1929	Founder of the "internationalized" Cuban Communist Party	1,000 pesos	obverse	2010– (2015–)

== Czech Republic ==
(Czech Republic) Currency: Czech crown (Kč; since 1993)

Person	Lifespan	Reason for honour	Currency	Denomination	Obverse or reverse	Years of circulation
Ottokar I	c.1155–1230	Duke of Bohemia (1192–1193); King of Bohemia (1197–1230)	Czech crown	20 Kč	Obverse	1993–2014
Agnes of Bohemia	1211–1282	Princess of Bohemia; Saint of the Czech Republic	Czech crown	50 Kč	Obverse	1993–2017
Charles IV	1316–1378	King of Bohemia and Holy Roman Emperor	Czech koruna	100 Kč	obverse	1993–
Alois Rašín	1867–1923	Economist and politician	Czech koruna	100 Kč	obverse	2018– (commemorative)
John Amos Comenius	1592–1670	Bishop of Unity of the Brethren	Czech koruna	200 Kč	obverse	1993–
Božena Němcová	1820–1862	Author	Czech koruna	500 Kč	obverse	1993–
František Palacký	1798–1876	Historian and politician	Czech koruna	1000 Kč	obverse	1993–
Emmy Destinn	1878–1930	Czech operatic soprano	Czech koruna	2000 Kč	obverse	1993–
Tomáš Garrigue Masaryk	1850–1937	1st President of Czechoslovakia (1918–1935)	Czech koruna	5000 Kč	obverse	1993–

== Czechoslovakia ==
(Czechoslovakia) Currency: Czechoslovak crown (Kčs; 1919–1993)

Person	Lifespan	Reason for honour	Currency	Denomination	Obverse or reverse	Years of circulation
Jan Žižka	c.1360–1424	Czech general, contemporary and follower of Jan Hus, Hussite military leader, and later also a Radical Hussite who led the Taborites	Czechoslovak crown	25 Kčs	Obverse	1958–1972
Jan Žižka	c.1360–1424	Czech general, contemporary and follower of Jan Hus, Hussite military leader, and later also a Radical Hussite who led the Taborites	Czechoslovak crown	20 Kčs	Obverse	1971–1991
Pavol Országh Hviezdoslav	1849–1921	Poet, dramatist, translator, and for a short time, member of the Czechoslovak parliament	Czechoslovak crown	10 Kčs	Obverse	1986–1993
John Amos Comenius	1592–1670	Philosopher, pedagogue and theologian from the Margraviate of Moravia	Czechoslovak crown	20 Kčs	Obverse	1988–1993
Ľudovít Štúr	1815–1856	Leader of the Slovak national revival in the 19th century, and the author of the Slovak language standard	Czechoslovak koruna	50 Kčs	Obverse	1987–1993
Klement Gottwald	1896–1953	Leader of the Communist Party of Czechoslovakia (1929–1953); 14th Prime Minister of Czechoslovakia (1946–1948); 5th President of Czechoslovakia (1948–1953)	Czechoslovak crown	100 Kčs	Obverse	1989–1990
Bedřich Smetana	1824–1884	Composer who pioneered the development of a musical style which became closely identified with his country's aspirations to independent statehood	Czechoslovak crown	1,000 Kčs	Obverse	1985–1993

== Denmark ==
(Denmark) Currency: Krone (kr, 1873–Present)

Person	Lifespan	Reason for honour	Currency	Denomination	Obverse or reverse	Years of circulation
Hans Christian Andersen	1805–1875	poet and author of fairy tales	Krone	10 kr	obverse	1952–1955
Hans Christian Andersen	1805–1875	poet and author of fairy tales	Krone	10 kr	obverse	1954–1975
Christian Ditlev Frederik	1748–1827	agricultural reformer	Krone	500 kr	obverse	1964–1975
Thomasine Heiberg	1779–1856	author; portrait painted by Jens Juel	Krone	1,000 kr	obverse	1975–1998
Jens Juel	1745–1802	painter	Krone	100 kr	obverse	1974–1995
Jens Juel	1745–1802	painter	Krone	100 kr	obverse	1995–1999
Cathrine Sophie Kirchhoff	????-????	wife of J.H. Kirchhoff, Councillor of State; portrait painted by Jens Juel	Krone	10 kr	obverse	1975–1980
Hans Christian Ørsted	1777–1851	physicist; discoverer of electromagnetism	Krone	100 kr	obverse	1962–1974
Ole Rømer	1644–1710	astronomer; made the first measurements of the speed of light	Krone	50 kr	obverse	1957–1975
Engelke Charlotte Ryberg	????-????	daughter-in-law of Niels Ryberg, merchant; portrait painted by Jens Juel	Krone	50 kr	obverse	1975–1999
Bertel Thorvaldsen	1770–1844	sculptor	Krone	5 kr	obverse	1952–1962
Pauline Maria Tutein	1761–1827	wife of Peter Tutein, merchant; portrait painted by Jens Juel	Krone	20 kr	obverse	1980–1990
Franziska Genoveva von Qualen	????-????	noble woman of Holstein, Germany; portrait painted by Jens Juel	Krone	500 kr	obverse	1974–1997
Anna Ancher		Painter	Krone	1,000 kr	obverse	1998–2011
Michael Ancher		Painter	Krone	1,000 kr	obverse	1998–2011
Karen Blixen		author	Krone	50 kr	obverse	1999–2009
Niels Bohr		Winner of the Nobel Prize in Physics (1922)	Krone	500 kr	obverse	1997–2011
Johanne Luise Heiberg		Actress (1827–1864)	Krone	200 kr	obverse	1997–2010
Carl Nielsen		Composer, conductor and violinist	Krone	100 kr	obverse	1999–2010

== Djibouti ==
(Djibouti) Currency: Franc (since 1948)
Symbol: Fdj

Person	Lifespan	Reason for honor	Denomination	Obverse or reverse	Years of circulation
Ali Ahmed Oudoum	1913–1988		1,000 francs	Obverse	2005–
Mahmoud Harbi	1921–1960	Vice President of the Government Council of French Somaliland (1957–1958)	5,000 francs	Obverse	2002–
Hassan Gouled Aptidon	1916–2006	1st President of Djibouti (1977–1999)	10,000 francs	Obverse	1999–

== Dominican Republic ==
(Dominican Republic) Currency: Peso (since 1844)
Symbol: $/RD$

Person	Lifespan	Reason for honor	Denomination	Obverse or reverse	Years of circulation
Gregorio Luperón	1839–1897	20th President of the Dominican Republic (1879–1880)	20 pesos oro	obverse	2010–
Francisco del Rosario Sánchez, Juan Pablo Duarte and Matías Ramón Mella	1817–1861 (Francisco del Rosario Sánchez); 1813–1876 (Juan Pablo Duarte); 1816–1864 (Matías Ramón Mella)	Founding fathers of the Dominican Republic	100 pesos oro/pesos dominicanos	obverse	2000– (pesos oro) and 2011– (pesos dominicanos)
Mirabal sisters (Patria Mercedes Mirabal Reyes, María Argentina Minerva Mirabal Reyes and Antonia María Teresa Mirabal Reyes)	1924–1960 (Patria Mercedes Mirabal Reyes), 1926–1960 (María Argentina Minerva Mirabal Reyes), 1935–1960 (Antonia María Teresa Mirabal Reyes)	Three sisters that opposed the dictatorship of Rafael Trujillo	200 pesos oro/pesos dominicanos	obverse	2007– (pesos oro) and 2013– (pesos dominicanos)
Salomé Ureña de Henríquez and Pedro Henríquez Ureña	1850–1897 (Salomé Ureña de Henríquez); 1884–1946 (Pedro Henríquez Ureña)	Poet and pedagogist (Salomé Ureña de Henríquez); Essayist, philosopher, humanist, philologist and literary critic (Pedro Henríquez Ureña)	500 pesos oro/pesos dominicanos	obverse	2000– (pesos oro) and 2011– (pesos dominicanos)
Emilio Prud’Homme and José Rufino Reyes y Siancas	1856–1932 (Emilio Prud’Homme); 1835–1905 (José Rufino Reyes y Siancas)	Composers of the National Anthem of the Dominican Republic	2000 pesos oro/pesos dominicanos	obverse	2000– (pesos oro) and 2011– (pesos dominicanos)

== East Germany ==
(East Germany) Currency: Mark (M, 1948–1990)

Person	Lifespan	Reason for honour	Currency	Denomination	Obverse or reverse	Years of circulation
Alexander von Humbolt	1769-1859	geographer	East German mark	M 5	Obverse	1964-1975
Thomas Müntzer	1489–1525	Reformation-era German theologian	East German mark	M 5	Obverse	1975–1990
Friedrich Schiller	1759-1805	Poet and philosopher	East German mark	M 10	Obverse	1964-1971
Clara Zetkin	1857–1933	Marxist theorist, activist, and advocate for women's rights; Responsible for organizing the first International Women's Day in 1911	East German mark	M 10	Obverse	1971–1990
Johann Wolfgang von Goethe	1749–1832	Writer and statesman	East German mark	M20	Obverse	1964-1975
Johann Wolfgang von Goethe	1749–1832	Writer and statesman	East German mark	M20	Obverse	1975–1990
Friedrich Engels	1820–1895	Social scientist, author, political theorist, philosopher, and father of Marxist theory	East German mark	M 50	Obverse	1964-1971
Friedrich Engels	1820–1895	Social scientist, author, political theorist, philosopher, and father of Marxist theory	East German mark	M 50	Obverse	1971–1990
Karl Marx	1818–1883	Philosopher, economist, sociologist, journalist, and revolutionary socialist	East German mark	M 100	Obverse	1964-1975
Karl Marx	1818–1883	Philosopher, economist, sociologist, journalist, and revolutionary socialist	East German mark	M 100	Obverse	1975–1990

== Eastern Caribbean States ==
Currency: Dollar (since 1965)
Symbol: $

Person	Lifespan	Reason for honor	Denomination	Obverse or reverse	Years of circulation
Elizabeth II	1926–2022	Queen of the United Kingdom and the other Commonwealth realms (1952–2022) and Head of the Commonwealth of Nations (1952–2022)	All ($5–100)	Obverse	1993–
William Arthur Lewis	1915–1991	Economist	$100	Reverse	1993–
Kenneth Dwight Venner	c. 1946–2016	Governor of the Eastern Caribbean Central Bank (1989–2015)	$50	Reverse	2019–

== Egypt ==
(Egypt) Currency: Pound (LE, 1836–Present)

Person	Lifespan	Reason for honour	Currency	Denomination	Obverse or reverse	Years of circulation
Farouk I	1920–1965	King of Egypt (1936–1952)	Pound	LE 1	obverse	1950–1952
Farouk I	1920–1965	King of Egypt (1936–1952)	Pound	LE 5	obverse	1946–1952
Khafre	unknown	Pharaoh of the Fourth Dynasty (2558–2532 BC)	Pound	LE 10	reverse	1970–1979
Khafre	unknown	Pharaoh of the Fourth Dynasty (2558–2532 BC)	Pound	LE 10	reverse	1979–2003
Ramesses II	1302–1213 BC	Pharaoh of the Eighteenth Dynasty (1279–1213 BC)	Pound	50 PT	obverse	1968–1981
Ramesses II	1302–1213 BC	Pharaoh of the Eighteenth Dynasty (1279–1213 BC)	Pound	50 PT	obverse	1981–1986
Ramesses II	1302–1213 BC	Pharaoh of the Eighteenth Dynasty (1279–1213 BC)	Pound	LE 1	obverse	1968–1979
Tutankhamun	unknown	Pharaoh of the Eighteenth Dynasty (1333–1324 BC)	Pound	25 PT	obverse	1952–1962
Tutankhamun	unknown	Pharaoh of the Eighteenth Dynasty (1333–1324 BC)	Pound	50 PT	obverse	1952–1962
Tutankhamun	unknown	Pharaoh of the Eighteenth Dynasty (1333–1324 BC)	Pound	LE 1	obverse	1930–1950
Tutankhamun	unknown	Pharaoh of the Eighteenth Dynasty (1333–1324 BC)	Pound	LE 1	obverse	1952–1963
Tutankhamun	unknown	Pharaoh of the Eighteenth Dynasty (1333–1324 BC)	Pound	LE 1	obverse	1963–1968
Tutankhamun	unknown	Pharaoh of the Eighteenth Dynasty (1333–1324 BC)	Pound	LE 5	obverse	1952–1963
Tutankhamun	unknown	Pharaoh of the Eighteenth Dynasty (1333–1324 BC)	Pound	LE 5	obverse	1963–1969
Tutankhamun	unknown	Pharaoh of the Eighteenth Dynasty (1333–1324 BC)	Pound	LE 5	obverse	1970–1981
Tutankhamun	unknown	Pharaoh of the Eighteenth Dynasty (1333–1324 BC)	Pound	LE 10	obverse	1952–1962
Tutankhamun	unknown	Pharaoh of the Eighteenth Dynasty (1333–1324 BC)	Pound	LE 10	obverse	1962–1970
Tutankhamun	unknown	Pharaoh of the Eighteenth Dynasty (1333–1324 BC)	Pound	LE 100	obverse	1979–1994
Ramesses II*	1302–1213 BC	Pharaoh of the Nineteenth Dynasty (1279–1213 BC)	Pound	50 PT.	reverse	1996–
Ramesses II*	1302–1213 BC	Pharaoh of the Nineteenth Dynasty (1279–1213 BC)	Pound	E£1	reverse	1979–
Khafre*	unknown	Pharaoh of the Fourth Dynasty (2558–2532 BC)	Pound	E£10	reverse	2003–

== Equatorial Guinea ==
(Equatorial Guinea) Currency: Peseta (Pta (singular), Pts (pl), 1969–1975) and Ekwele (plu. Bipkwele; 1975–1985)

Person	Lifespan	Reason for honour	Currency	Denomination	Obverse or reverse	Years of circulation
Francisco Macías Nguema	1924–1979	1st President of Equatorial Guinea (1968–1979)	Peseta	All (100 to 1,000 Pts)	Obverse	1969–1975
Francisco Macías Nguema	1924–1979	1st President of Equatorial Guinea (1968–1979)	Ekwele (plu. Bipkwele)	All (25 to 1,000 bipkwele)	Obverse	1975–1985
Tomas Engono Nkogo			Bipkwele	100 bipkwele	Obverse	1979–1985
Rey Uganda			Bipkwele	500 bipkwele	Obverse	1979–1985
Rey Bioko			Bipkwele	1,000 bipkwele	Obverse	1979–1985
Enrique Nvo Okenve			Bipkwele	5,000 bipkwele	Obverse	1979–1985

== Estonia ==
(Estonia) Currency: Kroon (KR, 1928–1940, 1992–2010)

Person	Lifespan	Reason for honour	Currency	Denomination	Obverse or reverse	Years of circulation
Kristjan Raud	1865–1943	painter	Kroon	1 KR	obverse	1992–2010
Karl Ernst von Baer	1792–1876	a founding father of embryology, naturalist, biologist, geologist, meteorologist, geographer	Kroon	2 KR	obverse	1992–2010
Paul Keres	1916–1975	chess grandmaster	Kroon	5 KR	obverse	1992–2010
Jakob Hurt	1839–1907	folklorist, theologist and linguist	Kroon	10 KR	obverse	1992–2010
A. H. Tammsaare	1878–1940	writer	Kroon	25 KR	obverse	1992–2010
Rudolf Tobias	1873–1918	composer and organist	Kroon	50 KR	obverse	1994–2010
Lydia Koidula	1843–1886	poet; known as "The Founder of Estonian Theatre"	Kroon	100 KR	obverse	1992–2010
Carl Robert Jakobson	1841–1882	writer, politician and teacher; one of the most important persons of Estonian national awakening	Kroon	500 KR	obverse	1992–2010

== Eswatini ==
(Eswatini) Currency: Lilangeni/Emalangeni (since 1974)
Symbol: L or E (pl.)

Person	Years of Birth–Death	Reason for honor	Denomination	Obverse or reverse	In Circulation since
Mswati III	1968–	King of Eswatini (1986–)	10 emalangeni	Obverse	1974
Mswati III	1968–	King of Eswatini (1986–)	20 emalangeni	Obverse	1974
Mswati III	1968–	King of Eswatini (1986–)	50 emalangeni	Obverse	1974
Mswati III	1968–	King of Eswatini (1986–)	100 emalangeni	Obverse	1974
Mswati III	1968–	King of Eswatini (1986–)	200 emalangeni	Obverse	1974

== Ethiopia ==
(Ethiopia) Currency: Ethiopian dollar (Br/ብር; since 1894)

Person	Lifespan	Reason for honour	Currency	Denomination	Obverse or reverse	Years of circulation
Haile Selassie	1892–1975	Emperor of Ethiopia (1930–1974)	Ethiopian dollar	All (1–500 dollars)	Obverse	1945 (1–500 dollars); 1961 (1–500 dollars); 1966 (1–100 dollars)

== Faroe Islands ==
(Faroe Islands) Currency: Króna (kr, 1951–present)

Person	Lifespan	Reason for honour	Currency	Denomination	Obverse or reverse	Years of circulation
Jens Christian Djurhuus	1773–1853	first poet to write in Faroese	Króna	1,000 kr	obverse	1980–2005
Venceslaus Ulricus Hammershaimb	1819–1909	established modern orthography for the Faroese language	Króna	100 kr	obverse	1964–1978
Venceslaus Ulricus Hammershaimb	1819–1909	established modern orthography for the Faroese language	Króna	100 kr	obverse	1978–2003
Nólsoyar Páll	1765–1809	seaman, trader, poet	Króna	50 kr	obverse	1967–1978
Nólsoyar Páll	1765–1809	seaman, trader, poet	Króna	50 kr	obverse	1978–2001

== Federated Malay States ==
(Malaysia) Currency: Dollar ($; 1939–1953)

Person	Lifespan	Reason for honour	Currency	Denomination	Obverse or reverse	Years of circulation
George VI	1895–1952	King of the United Kingdom and the Dominions of the British Commonwealth (1936–1952); Emperor of India (1936–1947); and the first Head of the Commonwealth	Cent	All (1–50 cents)	Obverse	1940–1945
George VI	1895–1952	King of the United Kingdom and the Dominions of the British Commonwealth (1936–1952); Emperor of India (1936–1947); and the first Head of the Commonwealth	Dollar	All (1–10,000 dollars)	Obverse	1941–1945

== Federation of Malaya ==
(Federation of Malaya) Currency: Dollar ($; 1953–1967)

Person	Lifespan	Reason for honour	Currency	Denomination	Obverse or reverse	Years of circulation
Elizabeth II	1926–2022	Queen of the United Kingdom and the other Commonwealth Realms (1952–2022)	Dollar	All (1–10,000 dollars)	Obverse	1953–1967

== Fiji ==
(Fiji) Currency: Dollar (since 1969)
Symbol: $

Person	Lifespan	Reason for honor	Denomination	Obverse or reverse	Years of circulation
Ben Ryan	1971–	Rugby union coach; known for coaching the Fiji sevens	$7	Obverse	2017– (commemorative)
Osea Kolinisau	1985–	Captain of the Fiji sevens	$7	Obverse	2017– (commemorative)
Josaia Voreqe Bainimarama (Frank Bainimarama)	1954–	Prime Minister of Fiji (2007–2022)	$7	Reverse	2017– (commemorative)

== Finland ==
(Finland) Currency: Mark (Mk., 1860–2002)
Euro (€, 2002–present)

Person	Lifespan	Reason for honour	Currency	Denomination	Obverse or reverse	Years of circulation
Alvar Aalto	1898–1976	modernist architect	Mark	Mk 50	reverse	1986–2002
Anders Chydenius	1729–1803	priest and statesman	Mark	Mk 1,000	reverse	1986–2002
Väinö Linna	1920–1992	novelist	Mark	Mk 20	reverse	1993–2002
Elias Lönnrot	1802–1884	historian, composer of Kalevala (the national epic)	Mark	Mk 500	reverse	1986–2002
Paavo Nurmi	1897–1973	Olympic gold and silver multi-medalist	Mark	Mk 10	reverse	1986–1992
Jean Sibelius	1865–1957	classical composer	Mark	Mk 100	reverse	1986–2002

== France ==
(France) Currencies: Franc (F, 1795–2002)
Euro (€, 2002–present)

Person	Lifespan	Reason for honour	Currency	Denomination	Obverse or reverse	Years of circulation
René Descartes	1595–1650	Philosopher, mathematician, and scientist	Franc	100 F	Obverse	1942–1944
Jean-Baptiste Colbert, Marquis de Seignelay	1651–1690	Politician	Franc	100 F	Obverse	1944
Urbain Jean Joseph Le Verrier	1811–1877	Mathematician who specialised in celestial mechanics and is best known for predicting the existence and position of Neptune using only mathematics	Franc	50 F	Obverse	1946–1951
François-René de Chateaubriand	1768–1848	Writer, politician, diplomat, and historian; founder of Romanticism in French literature	Franc	500 F	Obverse	1945–1953
Victor Hugo	1802–1885	Poet, novelist and dramatist	Franc	500 F	Both	1954–1958
Armand Jean du Plessis, Cardinal-Duke of Richelieu and of Fronsac	1585–1642	Clergyman, nobleman, and statesman; Cardinal, Bishop of Luçon	Franc	1,000 F	Both	1953–1957
King Henri IV	1553–1610	King of France (1589–1610)	Franc	5,000 F	Both	1957 and 1958
Napoleon Bonaparte (Napoleon I)	1769–1821	Military and political leader who rose to prominence during the French Revolution and led several successful campaigns during the Revolutionary Wars; Emperor of the French (1804–1814); King of Italy (1805–1814); Protector of the Confederation of the Rhine (1806–1813)	Franc	10,000 F	Both	1955–1958
Victor Hugo	1802–1885	Poet, novelist and dramatist	New Franc	5 NF	Both	1960
Armand Jean du Plessis, Cardinal-Duke of Richelieu and of Fronsac	1585–1642	Clergyman, nobleman, and statesman; Cardinal, Bishop of Luçon	New Franc	10 NF	Both	1960
King Henri IV	1553–1610	King of France (1589–1610)	New Franc	50 NF	Both	1960
Napoleon Bonaparte (Napoleon I)	1769–1821	Military and political leader who rose to prominence during the French Revolution and led several successful campaigns during the Revolutionary Wars; Emperor of the French (1804–1814); King of Italy (1805–1814); Protector of the Confederation of the Rhine (1806–1813)	New Franc	100 NF	Both	1960
Jean-Baptiste Poquelin	1622–1673	Playwright and actor	New Franc	500 NF	Both	1959–1966
Louis Pasteur	1822–1895	Chemist and microbiologist renowned for his discoveries of the principles of vaccination, microbial fermentation and pasteurization	Franc	5 F	Both	1966–1970
François-Marie Arouet (Voltaire)	1694–1778	Enlightenment writer, historian, and philosopher	Franc	10 F	Both	1963–1973
Jean Racine	1639–1699	Dramatist	Franc	50 F	Both	1962–1976
Pierre Corneille	1606–1684	Tragedian	Franc	100 F	Both	1964–1979
Hector Berlioz	1803–1869	Composer	Franc	10 F	Both	1972–1978
Claude-Achille Debussy	1862–1918	Composer	Franc	20 F	Both	1980–1997
Maurice Quentin de La Tour	1704–1788	Portraitist	Franc	50 F	Both	1976–1992
Ferdinand-Victor-Eugène Delacroix	1798-1863	Romantic painter	Franc	100 F	Both	1978–1995
Charles-Louis de Secondat, Baron de La Brède et de Montesquieu	1689–1755	Lawyer, man of letters, and political philosopher	Franc	200 F	Both	1981–1994
Blaise Pascal	1623–1662	Mathematician, physicist, inventor, writer and Christian philosopher	Franc	500 F	Both	1968–1993
Antoine de Saint-Exupéry	1900–1944	Author and aviator	Franc	50 F	Obverse	1992–2002
Paul Cézanne	1839–1906	Post-Impressionist painter	Franc	100 F	Obverse	1997–2002
Gustave Eiffel	1832–1923	engineer and architect	Franc	200 F	obverse	1996–2002
Marie Curie and Pierre Curie	1867–1934 (Marie Curie); 1859–1906 (Pierre Curie)	Physicist and chemist (Marie Curie); Physicist, a pioneer in crystallography, magnetism, piezoelectricity and radioactivity (Pierre Curie); received the Nobel Prize in Physics in 1903	Franc	500 F	Obverse	1995–2002

== French Polynesia ==
(French Polynesia) Currency: CFP franc (F; 1945–)

Person	Lifespan	Reason for honour	Currency	Denomination	Obverse or reverse	Years of circulation
Louis Antoine de Bougainville	1729–1811	Admiral and explorer; known to circumnavigate the world, during the 18th century	CFP franc	5,000 CFP francs	Obverse	1992–2010
Auguste Febvrier Despointes	1796–1855	Counter admiral	CFP franc	5,000 CFP francs	Reverse	1992–2010

== Gabon ==
(Gabon) Currency: Central African CFA franc (FCFA; since 1945)

Person	Lifespan	Reason for honour	Currency	Denomination	Obverse or reverse	Years of circulation
El Hadj Omar Bongo Ondimba	1935–2009	President of Gabon (1967–2009)	Central African CFA franc	10,000 CFA francs	Obverse	1971
El Hadj Omar Bongo Ondimba	1935–2009	President of Gabon (1967–2009)	Central African CFA franc	All (1,000–10,000 CFA francs)	Obverse	1974–1984 (1,000 CFA francs); 1974–1978 (5,000 CFA francs); 1974–1978 (10,000 CFA francs)
El Hadj Omar Bongo Ondimba	1935–2009	President of Gabon (1967–2009)	Central African CFA franc	1,000 CFA francs	Obverse	1985–1992

== The Gambia ==
(The Gambia) Currency: Dalasi (since 1971)
Symbol: D

Person	Lifespan	Reason for honor	Denomination	Obverse or reverse	Years of circulation
Yahya Abdul-Aziz Jemus Junkung Jammeh	1965–	2nd President of the Gambia (1994–2016)	All (5–200 Dalasis)	Obverse	2015–

== Georgia ==
(Georgia (country)) Currency: Lari (1995– Present)
Symbol: GEL/

Person	Lifespan	Reason for honor	Denomination	Obverse or reverse	Years of circulation
Niko Pirosmani	1862–1918	Primitivist painter	1	obverse	1995–
Zakaria Paliashvili	1871–1933	Composer	2	obverse	1995–
Ivane Javakhishvili	1876–1940	Academician	5	obverse	1995–
Akaki Tsereteli	1840–1915	Poet and Public Figure	10	obverse	1995–
Ilia Chavchavadze	1837–1907	Public Figure, Publicist, Writer	20	obverse	1995–
Queen Tamar	c. 1160–1213	The Queen Regnant of Georgia	50	obverse	1995–
Shota Rustaveli	1172–1216	Poet	100	obverse	1995–
Kakutsa Cholokashvili	1888–1930	Military Commander	200	obverse	2006–
David IV of Georgia	1073–1125	King of Georgia	500	obverse	1995–

== Germany ==
(Germany) Currencies: Deutsche Mark (DM, 1948–2002)
Euro (€, 2002–present)

Person	Lifespan	Reason for honour	Currency	Denomination	Obverse or reverse	Years of circulation
Paul Ehrlich	1854–1915	Nobel Prize winner, 1908	Deutsche Mark	DM 200	obverse	1990–2002
Carl Friedrich Gauss	1777–1855	mathematician and scientist	Deutsche Mark	DM 10	obverse	1991–2002
Jacob Grimm	1785–1863	older of the Brothers Grimm, recorders of folk and fairy tales	Deutsche Mark	DM 1,000	obverse	1992–2002
Wilhelm Grimm	1786–1859	younger of the Brothers Grimm, recorders of folk and fairy tales	Deutsche Mark	DM 1,000	obverse	1992–2002
Maria Sibylla Merian	1647–1717	naturalist and illustrator	Deutsche Mark	DM 500	obverse	1992–2002
Balthasar Neumann	1687–1753	Baroque architect	Deutsche Mark	DM 50	obverse	1991–2002
Clara Schumann	1819–1896	classical pianist and composer	Deutsche Mark	DM 100	obverse	1990–2002
Bettina von Arnim	1785–1859	novelist	Deutsche Mark	DM 5	obverse	1992–2002
Annette von Droste-Hülshoff	1797–1848	poet and author	Deutsche Mark	DM 20	obverse	1992–2002

== Ghana ==
(Ghana) Currency: Cedi (since 2007)
Symbol: GH₵

Person	Lifespan	Reason for honor	Denomination	Obverse or reverse	Years of circulation
Ebenezer Ako-Adjei, Edward Akufo-Addo, Joseph Boakye Danquah, Francis Nwia Kofie Kwame Nkrumah, Emmanuel Obetsebi-Lamptey and William Ofori Atta	1916–2002 (Ebenezer Ako-Adjei); 1906–1979 (Edward Akufo-Addo); 1895–1965 (Joseph Boakye Danquah); 1909–1972 (Francis Nwia Kofie Kwame Nkrumah); 1902–1963 (Emmanuel Obetsebi-Lamptey); 1910–1988 (William Ofori Atta)	Leaders of the United Gold Coast Convention (known as "The Big Six")	GH₵1	Obverse	2007–
Francis Nwia Kofie Kwame Nkrumah	1909–1972	1st Prime Minister of Ghana (1957–1960); 1st President of Ghana (1960–1966)	GH₵2	Obverse	2010–
Ebenezer Ako-Adjei, Edward Akufo-Addo, Joseph Boakye Danquah, Francis Nwia Kofie Kwame Nkrumah, Emmanuel Obetsebi-Lamptey and William Ofori Atta	1916–2002 (Ebenezer Ako-Adjei); 1906–1979 (Edward Akufo-Addo); 1895–1965 (Joseph Boakye Danquah); 1909–1972 (Francis Nwia Kofie Kwame Nkrumah); 1902–1963 (Emmanuel Obetsebi-Lamptey); 1910–1988 (William Ofori Atta)	Leaders of the United Gold Coast Convention (known as "The Big Six")	GH₵5	Obverse	2007–
James Emman Kwegyir Aggrey	1875–1927	Intellectual, missionary, and teacher	GH₵5	Obverse	2017– (commemorative); 2018– (regular issue)
Ebenezer Ako-Adjei, Edward Akufo-Addo, Joseph Boakye Danquah, Francis Nwia Kofie Kwame Nkrumah, Emmanuel Obetsebi-Lamptey and William Ofori Atta	1916–2002 (Ebenezer Ako-Adjei); 1906–1979 (Edward Akufo-Addo); 1895–1965 (Joseph Boakye Danquah); 1909–1972 (Francis Nwia Kofie Kwame Nkrumah); 1902–1963 (Emmanuel Obetsebi-Lamptey); 1910–1988 (William Ofori Atta)	Leaders of the United Gold Coast Convention (known as "The Big Six")	GH₵10	Obverse	2007–
Ebenezer Ako-Adjei, Edward Akufo-Addo, Joseph Boakye Danquah, Francis Nwia Kofie Kwame Nkrumah, Emmanuel Obetsebi-Lamptey and William Ofori Atta	1916–2002 (Ebenezer Ako-Adjei); 1906–1979 (Edward Akufo-Addo); 1895–1965 (Joseph Boakye Danquah); 1909–1972 (Francis Nwia Kofie Kwame Nkrumah); 1902–1963 (Emmanuel Obetsebi-Lamptey); 1910–1988 (William Ofori Atta)	Leaders of the United Gold Coast Convention (known as "The Big Six")	GH₵20	Obverse	2007–
Ebenezer Ako-Adjei, Edward Akufo-Addo, Joseph Boakye Danquah, Francis Nwia Kofie Kwame Nkrumah, Emmanuel Obetsebi-Lamptey and William Ofori Atta	1916–2002 (Ebenezer Ako-Adjei); 1906–1979 (Edward Akufo-Addo); 1895–1965 (Joseph Boakye Danquah); 1909–1972 (Francis Nwia Kofie Kwame Nkrumah); 1902–1963 (Emmanuel Obetsebi-Lamptey); 1910–1988 (William Ofori Atta)	Leaders of the United Gold Coast Convention (known as "The Big Six")	GH₵50	Obverse	2007–
Ebenezer Ako-Adjei, Edward Akufo-Addo, Joseph Boakye Danquah, Francis Nwia Kofie Kwame Nkrumah, Emmanuel Obetsebi-Lamptey and William Ofori Atta	1916–2002 (Ebenezer Ako-Adjei); 1906–1979 (Edward Akufo-Addo); 1895–1965 (Joseph Boakye Danquah); 1909–1972 (Francis Nwia Kofie Kwame Nkrumah); 1902–1963 (Emmanuel Obetsebi-Lamptey); 1910–1988 (William Ofori Atta)	Leaders of the United Gold Coast Convention (known as "The Big Six")	GH₵100	Obverse	2019–
Ebenezer Ako-Adjei, Edward Akufo-Addo, Joseph Boakye Danquah, Francis Nwia Kofie Kwame Nkrumah, Emmanuel Obetsebi-Lamptey and William Ofori Atta	1916–2002 (Ebenezer Ako-Adjei); 1906–1979 (Edward Akufo-Addo); 1895–1965 (Joseph Boakye Danquah); 1909–1972 (Francis Nwia Kofie Kwame Nkrumah); 1902–1963 (Emmanuel Obetsebi-Lamptey); 1910–1988 (William Ofori Atta)	Leaders of the United Gold Coast Convention (known as "The Big Six")	GH₵200	Obverse	2019–

== Gibraltar ==
(Gibraltar) Currency: Pound (since 1927)
Symbol: £

Person	Lifespan	Reason for honor	Denomination	Obverse or reverse	Years of circulation
Elizabeth II	1926–2022	Queen of the United Kingdom of Great Britain and Northern Ireland (1952–2022) and Head of the Commonwealth (1952–2022)	All	Obverse	1995–
Tariq ibn Ziyad	670–720	General and Governor of Al-Andalus (711–712)	£5	Obverse	1995–
George Augustus Eliott	1717–1790	Governor of Londonderry (1774–1775); Governor of Gibraltar (1777–1790); Officer of the British Army during the Great Siege of Gibraltar	£10	Obverse	1995–
Horatio Nelson	1758–1805	Flag Officer of the Royal Navy	£20	Obverse	1995–
Winston Churchill	1874–1965	Prime Minister of the United Kingdom (1940–1945; 1951–1955)	£50	Obverse	1995–
Joshua Hassan	1915–1997	1st and 3rd Chief Minister of Gibraltar (1st: 1964–1969; 3rd: 1972–1987); 1st Mayor of Gibraltar (1955–1969)	£100	Obverse	2017– (commemorative)

== Greece ==
(Greece) Currencies: Drachma (₯, 1832–2002)
Euro (€, 2002–present)

Person	Lifespan	Reason for honour	Currency	Denomination	Obverse or reverse	Years of circulation
John Capodistria	1776–1831	1st Governor of Greece (1827–1831)	Drachma	₯500	obverse	1983–2002
Rigas Feraios	1757–1798	Revolutionary; first casualty of the Greek War of Independence	Drachma	₯200	obverse	1997–2002
Konstantinos Kanaris	1790–1877	Hero of the Greek War of Independence; Prime Minister of Greece (1844, 1848-1849, 1864, 1864-1865, 1877-1878)	Drachma	₯100	obverse	1944
Theodoros Kolokotronis	1770–1843	General during the Greek War of Independence	Drachma	₯5,000	obverse	1997–2002
Adamantios Korais	1748–1833	Linguist; author of the first modern Greek dictionary	Drachma	₯100	reverse	1978–2002
Georgios Papanikolaou	1883–1962	Pioneer in early cancer detection	Drachma	₯10,000	obverse	1995–2002

== Guadeloupe ==
(Guadeloupe) Currency: Franc (1848–1960)

Person	Lifespan	Reason for honour	Currency	Denomination	Obverse or reverse	Years of circulation
Christopher Columbus	1451–1506	Explorer, navigator and colonizer; responsible for establishing permanent settlements on the island of Hispaniola and initiated the European colonization of the New World	Franc	5 francs	Obverse	1942
Louis Antoine de Bougainville	1729–1811	First Frenchman to circumnavigate the world, during the 18th century	Franc	5 francs	Obverse	1947–1949
Jean-Baptiste Colbert (Marquis de Seignelay)	1651–1690	Politician	Franc	10 francs	Obverse	1947–1949
Émile Gentil	1866–1914	Colonial administrator, naval officer, and colonial military leader	Franc	20 francs	Obverse	1947–1949
Belain d'Esnambuc			Franc	50 francs	Obverse	1947–1949
Bertrand-François Mahé de La Bourdonnais	1699–1753	Naval officer	Franc	100 francs	Obverse	1947–1949
Victor Schœlcher	1804–1893	Abolitionist	Franc	5,000 francs	Obverse	1947–1949

== Guatemala ==
(Guatemala) Currency: Quetzal (since 1925)
Symbol: Q

Person	Lifespan	Reason for honor	Denomination	Obverse or reverse	Years of circulation
Tecun Uman	1500–1524	Prince and Commander-and-Chief of the Quiche Realm during the Spanish Conquest	50 centavos	Obverse	1972–
José María Orellana	1872–1926	President of the Republic of Guatemala (1921–1926); responsible for the introduction of the quetzal as Guatemala's national currency	1 quetzal	Obverse	1972– (paper), 2006– (polymer)
Justo Rufino Barrios	1835–1885	President of Guatemala (1873–1885)	5 quetzales	Obverse	1969– (paper), 2011– (polymer)
Miguel García Granados	1809–1878	President of Guatemala (1871–1873)	10 quetzales	Obverse	1971–
Mariano Gálvez	c. 1794–1862	Governor of Guatemala (1831–1838)	20 quetzales	Obverse	1972–
Carlos Zachrisson		Minister of Finance (1923–1926)	50 quetzales	Obverse	1974–
Francisco Marroquín	1499–1563	Bishop of the Realm of Goathemala; Founder of San Carlos de Borromeo University	100 quetzales	Obverse	1972–
Sebastián Hurtado, Mariano Valverde and Germán Alcántara		Composers of the marimba	200 quetzales	Obverse	2009–

== Guernsey ==
(Guernsey) Currency: Pound (since 1921)
Symbol: £

Person	Lifespan	Reason for honor	Denomination	Obverse or reverse	Years of circulation
Queen Elizabeth II	1926–2022	Queen of the United Kingdom and the other Commonwealth realms (1952–2022)	All (£5–50)	Obverse	1994–
Daniel de Lisle Brock	1762–1842	Bailiff of Guernsey (1821–1842)	£1	Reverse	1991–
Thomas de la Rue	1793–1866	Printer; Founder of the De La Rue printing company	£1 and £5	Reverse	2013– (commemorative £1); 1991– (£5)
Isaac Brock	1769–1812	Lieutenant Governor of Upper Canada (Acting) (1811–1812); Hero of Upper Canada	£10	Reverse	1991–
Lord de Saumarez	1757–1836	Admiral of the British Royal Navy, 1st Baron de Saumarez	£20	Reverse	1991–

== Guinea ==
(Guinea) Currency: Franc (FG; 1959–1971); Syli (1971–1985)

Person	Lifespan	Reason for honour	Currency	Denomination	Obverse or reverse	Years of circulation
Ahmed Sékou Touré	1922–1984	1st President of Guinea (1958–1984)	Franc	All (50-10,000 francs)	Obverse	1958–1963
Mafori Bangoura			Syli	1 Syli	Obverse	1981
Mohammed V	1909–1961	Sultan of Morocco (1927–1957); King of Morocco (1957–1961)	Syli	2 Sylis	Obverse	1981
Francis Nwia Kofie Kwame Nkrumah	1909–1972	1st President of Ghana (1960–1966)	Syli	5 Sylis	Obverse	1980
Patrice Émery Lumumba	1925–1961	Prime Minister of Congo-Léopoldville (June 24 – September 14, 1960)	Syli	10 Sylis	Obverse	1971–1980
Behazin of Dahomey		King of Dahomey	Syli	25 Sylis	Obverse	1971–1980
Alpha Yaya Diallo		King of Labé	Syli	50 Sylis	Obverse	1971–1980
Samory Touré			Syli	100 Sylis	Obverse	1971–1980
Josip Broz Tito	1892–1980	1st President of Yugoslavia (1953–1980); 23rd Prime Minister of Yugoslavia (1944–1963); 1st Secretary-General of the Non-Aligned Movement (1961–1964); 1st Federal Secretary of National Defense (1945–1953); 4th President of the League of Communists of Yugoslavia (1939–1940)	Syli	500 Sylis	Obverse	1980

== Guinea-Bissau ==
(Guinea-Bissau) Currency: Peso (1975–1993)

Person	Lifespan	Reason for honour	Currency	Denomination	Obverse or reverse	Years of circulation
Pansa Na Isna			Peso	50 pesos	Obverse	1975–1993
Domingos Ramos			Peso	100 pesos	Obverse	1975–1990
Francisco Mendes	1939–1978	1st Prime Minister of Guinea-Bissau (1973–1978)	Peso	500 pesos	Obverse	1983–1990
Amílcar Cabral	1924–1973	Guinea-Bissauan and Cape Verdean agricultural engineer, writer, and a nationalist thinker and political leader	Peso	All (1000–10,000 pesos)	Obverse	1978–1993 (1000 pesos); 1984–1993 (5000 pesos); 1990–1997 (10,000 pesos)

== Haiti ==
(Haiti) Currency: Gourde (since 1872)
Symbol: G

Person	Lifespan	Reason for honor	Denomination	Obverse or reverse	Years of circulation
Catherine Flon Arcahaie	fl.1803	Responsible for the creation of the Flag of Haiti	10 Gourdes	Obverse	1988–
Sanité Bélair	1781–1805	Freedom fighter and revolutionary; lieutenant in the army of Toussaint Louverture	10 Gourdes	Obverse	2004–
François-Dominique Toussaint Louverture	1743–1803	Leader of the Haitian Revolution	20 Gourdes	Obverse	2001–
Fabre Geffrard	1806–1878	8th President of Haiti (1859–1867)	25 Gourdes	Obverse	2004–
Louis Étienne Félicité Lysius Salomon	1815–1888	13th President of Haiti (1879–1888)	50 Gourdes	Obverse	1979–
François Capois	1766–1806	Rebel slave and officer in the Haitian Revolution	50 Gourdes	Obverse	2004–
Henri Christophe	1767–1820	President of the State of Haiti (1807–1811); King of Haiti (1811–1820)	100 Gourdes	Obverse	1979–
Jean-Jacques Dessalines	1758–1806	Leader of the Haitian Revolution and Emperor of Haiti (1804–1806)	250 Gourdes	Obverse	1979–
Alexandre Sabès Pétion	1770–1818	1st President of Haiti (1806–1818)	500 Gourdes	Obverse	1888–
Florvil Hyppolite	1828–1896	16th President of Haiti (1889–1896)	1,000 Gourdes	Obverse	1999–

== Honduras ==
(Honduras) Currency: Lempira (since 1931)
Symbol: L

Person	Lifespan	Reason for honor	Denomination	Obverse or reverse	Years of circulation
Lempira	?-1537	War chieftain of the Lencas	L1	Obverse	1951–
Marco Aurelio Soto	1846–1908	President of Honduras (1876–1883)	L2	Obverse	1976–
José Francisco Morazán Quezada	1792–1842	President of the Federal Republic of Central America (1830–1839)	L5	Obverse	1950–
José Trinidad Cabañas	1805–1871	Head of State of Honduras (1852–1855)	L10	Obverse	1951–
José Dionisio de la Trinidad de Herrera y Díaz del Valle	1781–1850	Head of State of Honduras (1824–1827)	L20	Obverse	1951– (paper); 2008– (polymer)
Juan Manuel Gálvez Durón	1887–1972	39th President of Honduras (1949–1954)	L50	Obverse	1976–
José Cecilio del Valle	1780–1834	3rd President-elect of the Federal Republic of Central America	L100	Obverse	1951–
Ramón Rosa Soto	1848–1893	Lieutenant Secretary of Finance of Guatemala (1871–1873); Secretary of Education of Guatemala and Secretary of Foreign Affairs of Guatemala (1873–1876); Secretary General of Honduras (1876–1883)	L500	Obverse	1995–

== Hungary ==
(Hungary) Currency: Forint (Ft, 1946–present)

Person	Lifespan	Reason for honour	Currency	Denomination	Obverse or reverse	Years of circulation
Endre Ady	1877–1919	poet	Forint	500 Ft	obverse	1970–1999
Endre Ady	1877–1919	poet	Forint	500 Ft	obverse	1992–1999
Béla Bartók	1881–1945	Composer and pianist	Forint	1,000 Ft	obverse	1983–1999
Béla Bartók	1881–1945	Composer and pianist	Forint	1,000 Ft	obverse	1993–1999
Charles I	1288–1342	King of Hungary (1308–1342)	Forint	200 Ft	obverse	1998-2009
György Dózsa	????-1514	Led a peasants' revolt against the nobility	Forint	20 Ft	obverse	1948–1992
György Dózsa	????-1514	Led a peasants' revolt against the nobility	Forint	20 Ft	obverse	1920–1992
György Dózsa	????-1514	Led a peasants' revolt against the nobility	Forint	20 Ft	obverse	1960–1992
Lajos Kossuth	1802–1894	Statesman and freedom fighter	Forint	100 Ft	obverse	1948–1998
Lajos Kossuth	1802–1894	Statesman and freedom fighter	Forint	100 Ft	obverse	1920–1998
Lajos Kossuth	1802–1894	Statesman and freedom fighter	Forint	100 Ft	obverse	1959–1998
Lajos Kossuth	1802–1894	Statesman and freedom fighter	Forint	100 Ft	obverse	1992–1998
Sándor Petőfi	1823–1849	National poet; key figure of the Hungarian Revolution of 1848	Forint	10 Ft	obverse	1947–1992
Sándor Petőfi	1823–1849	National poet; key figure of the Hungarian Revolution of 1848	Forint	10 Ft	obverse	1950–1992
Sándor Petőfi	1823–1849	National poet; key figure of the Hungarian Revolution of 1848	Forint	10 Ft	obverse	1959–1992
Gabriel Bethlen	1580–1629	Prince of Transylvania (1613–1629); led an uprising against the Hungarian monarchy	Forint	2,000 Ft	both	1998–
Matthias Corvinus	1443–1490	King of Hungary (1458–1490)	Forint	1,000 Ft	obverse	1998–
Ferenc Deák	1803–1876	Statesman and reformer	Forint	20,000 Ft	obverse	2001–
Francis II Rákóczi*	1676–1735	Prince of Transylvania; led the uprising against the Hungarian monarchy (1703–1711)	Forint	500 Ft	obverse	1998–
Stephen I	975–1038	1st King of Hungary (1006–1038)	Forint	10,000 Ft	obverse	1997–
István Széchenyi*	1791–1860	Statesman and political theorist	Forint	5,000 Ft	obverse	1999–

== Iceland ==
(Iceland) Currency: Króna (kr, 1874–Present)

Person	Lifespan	Reason for honour	Currency	Denomination	Obverse or reverse	Years of circulation
Ingólfur Arnarson	unknown	first permanent settler of Iceland (874)	Króna	5 kr	obverse	1960–1969
Christian IX	1818–1906	King of Denmark (1863–1906); signed the treaty that gave Iceland sovereignty in 1874	Króna	5 kr	obverse	1886–1907
Christian IX	1818–1906	King of Denmark (1863–1906); signed the treaty that gave Iceland sovereignty in 1874	Króna	5 kr	obverse	1907–1919
Christian IX	1818–1906	King of Denmark (1863–1906); signed the treaty that gave Iceland sovereignty in 1874	Króna	5 kr	obverse	1919–1920
Christian IX	1818–1906	King of Denmark (1863–1906); signed the treaty that gave Iceland sovereignty in 1874	Króna	10 kr	obverse	1886–1907
Christian IX	1818–1906	King of Denmark (1863–1906); signed the treaty that gave Iceland sovereignty in 1874	Króna	10 kr	obverse	1907–1916
Christian IX	1818–1906	King of Denmark (1863–1906); signed the treaty that gave Iceland sovereignty in 1874	Króna	10 kr	obverse	1916–1920
Christian IX	1818–1906	King of Denmark (1863–1906); signed the treaty that gave Iceland sovereignty in 1874	Króna	50 kr	obverse	1886–1907
Christian IX	1818–1906	King of Denmark (1863–1906); signed the treaty that gave Iceland sovereignty in 1874	Króna	50 kr	obverse	1916–1920
Christian IX	1818–1906	King of Denmark (1863–1906); signed the treaty that gave Iceland sovereignty in 1874	Króna	100 kr	obverse	1916–1935
Christian X	1870–1947	King of Denmark (1912–1947); King of Iceland (1918–1944)	Króna	5 kr	obverse	1907–1916
Christian X	1870–1947	King of Denmark (1912–1947); King of Iceland (1918–1944)	Króna	5 kr	obverse	1929–1935
Christian X	1870–1947	King of Denmark (1912–1947); King of Iceland (1918–1944)	Króna	10 kr	obverse	1907–1916
Christian X	1870–1947	King of Denmark (1912–1947); King of Iceland (1918–1944)	Króna	10 kr	obverse	1929–1934
Christian X	1870–1947	King of Denmark (1912–1947); King of Iceland (1918–1944)	Króna	50 kr	obverse	1907–1916
Christian X	1870–1947	King of Denmark (1912–1947); King of Iceland (1918–1944)	Króna	50 kr	obverse	1931–1936
Christian X	1870–1947	King of Denmark (1912–1947); King of Iceland (1918–1944)	Króna	100 kr	obverse	1929–1935
Jón Eiríksson	1728–1787	promoter of enlightenment	Króna	5 kr	obverse	1935–1947
Jón Eiríksson	1728–1787	promoter of enlightenment	Króna	5 kr	obverse	1947–1960
Jón Eiríksson	1728–1787	promoter of enlightenment	Króna	10 kr		1969–1984
Jón Eiríksson	1728–1787	promoter of enlightenment	Króna	50 kr	obverse	1936–1948
Jón Eiríksson	1728–1787	promoter of enlightenment	Króna	50 kr	obverse	1948–1960
Frederik VIII	1843–1912	King of Denmark (1906–1912)	Króna	50 kr	obverse	1907–1916
Arngrímur Jónsson	1568–1648	scholar	Króna	10 kr	obverse	1981–1984
Árni Magnússon	1663–1730	medieval Icelandic scholar	Króna	100 kr	obverse	1981–1995
Jón Sigurðsson	1811–1879	leader of the Icelandic independence movement	Króna	10 kr	obverse	1934–1947
Jón Sigurðsson	1811–1879	leader of the Icelandic independence movement	Króna	10 kr	obverse	1947–1969
Jón Sigurðsson	1811–1879	leader of the Icelandic independence movement	Króna	100 kr	obverse	1935–1947
Jón Sigurðsson	1811–1879	leader of the Icelandic independence movement	Króna	100 kr	obverse	1947–1973
Jón Sigurðsson	1811–1879	leader of the Icelandic independence movement	Króna	500 kr	obverse	1944–1948
Jón Sigurðsson	1811–1879	leader of the Icelandic independence movement	Króna	500 kr	obverse	1948–1968
Guðbrandur Þorláksson	1541–1627	bishop; published the first Icelandic translation of the Bible (1584)	Króna	50 kr	obverse	1981–1987
Ingibjörg Benediktsdóttir	1640–1673	2nd wife of Gísli Þorláksson	Króna	5,000 kr	obverse	1986–
Jónas Hallgrímsson	1807–1845	Poet, author and naturalist	Króna	10,000 kr	obverse	2013–
Ragnheiður Jónsdóttir	1646–1715	developer of embroidery; 3rd wife of Gísli Þorláksson	Króna	5,000 kr	both	1986–
Jóhannes Sveinsson Kjarval	1885–1972	painter	Króna	2,000 kr	obverse	1995–
Jón Sigurðsson	1811–1879	leader of the 19th century independence movement	Króna	500 kr	both	1981–
Brynjólfur Sveinsson	1605–1675	Lutheran bishop; collected Old Norse literature	Króna	1,000 kr	obverse	1984–
Gísli Þorláksson	1631–1684	Lutheran bishop of Hólar (1657–1684); husband of Ragnheiður Jónsdóttir	Króna	5,000 kr	obverse	1986–
Gróa Þorleifsdóttir	1640–1660	1st wife of Gísli Þorláksson	Króna	5,000 kr	obverse	1986–

== India ==
(India) Currency: Rupee (since 1947)
Symbol: ₹

Person	Lifespan	Reason for honor	Denomination	Obverse or reverse	Years of circulation
Mahatma Gandhi	1869–1948	Leader of the Indian independence movement	₹1000	Obverse	2000–2016
Mahatma Gandhi	1869–1948	Leader of the Indian independence movement	₹2000	Obverse	2016–2023
Victoria	1819 - 1901	Queen of the United Kingdom	5	Reverse	1858– (discontinue)
-	-	French Indian Rupee	1	Reverse	1938– (discontinue)
George V	1865 - 1936	King of the United Kingdom and India	1, 5, 10, 15, 50	Obverse	1937– (discontinue)
George VI	1895 - 1952	King of the United Kingdom and India	1, 2, 5, 10, 100,1000	Obverse	1943– (discontinue)
Mahatma Gandhi (Mohandas Karamchand Gandhi)	1869–1948	Leader of the Indian independence movement	₹5	Obverse	2002–
Mahatma Gandhi (Mohandas Karamchand Gandhi)	1869–1948	Leader of the Indian independence movement	₹10	Obverse	1996–, 2018–
Mahatma Gandhi (Mohandas Karamchand Gandhi)	1869–1948	Leader of the Indian independence movement	₹20	Obverse	2002–, 2019–
Mahatma Gandhi (Mohandas Karamchand Gandhi)	1869–1948	Leader of the Indian independence movement	₹50	Obverse	1997–, 2017–
Mahatma Gandhi (Mohandas Karamchand Gandhi)	1869–1948	Leader of the Indian independence movement	₹100	Obverse	1996–, 2018–
Mahatma Gandhi (Mohandas Karamchand Gandhi)	1869–1948	Leader of the Indian independence movement	₹200	Obverse	2017–
Mahatma Gandhi (Mohandas Karamchand Gandhi)	1869–1948	Leader of the Indian independence movement	₹500	Obverse	1987–, 2016–
Mahatma Gandhi (Mohandas Karamchand Gandhi)	1869–1948	Leader of the Indian independence movement	₹1000	Obverse	2000 - 2016–
Mahatma Gandhi (Mohandas Karamchand Gandhi)	1869–1948	Leader of the Indian independence movement	₹2000	Obverse	2016 - 2017–

== Indonesia ==
(Indonesia) Currency: Rupiah (Rp; since 1945)

Person	Lifespan	Reason for honour	Currency	Denomination	Obverse or reverse	Years of circulation
Sukarno	1901–1970	1st President of Indonesia (1945–1967)	Rupiah	All (1–100 rupiah)	Obverse	1946–1950
Sukarno	1901–1970	1st President of Indonesia (1945–1967)	Rupiah	All (5–100 rupiah)	Obverse	1947
Sukarno	1901–1970	1st President of Indonesia (1945–1967)	Rupiah	All (25–250 rupiah)	Obverse	1947
Sukarno	1901–1970	1st President of Indonesia (1945–1967)	Rupiah	All (40–600 rupiah)	Obverse	1947
Sukarno	1901–1970	1st President of Indonesia (1945–1967)	New Rupiah (Rupiah Baru)	Both (10 and 100 rupiah baru)	Obverse	1949
Sukarno	1901–1970	1st President of Indonesia (1945–1967)	Rupiah	Both (Rp 5 and Rp 10)	Obverse	1950
Raden Adjeng Kartini	1879–1904	Women's emancipation and national heroine	Rupiah	Rp 5	Obverse	1953–1961
Pangeran Diponegoro	1785–1855	Prince of Java, national hero	Rupiah	Rp 100	Obverse	1953–1960
Sukarno	1901–1970	1st President of Indonesia (1945–1967)	Rupiah	Both (Rp 1 and Rp 2 1/2)	Obverse	1964–1968
Sukarno	1901–1970	1st President of Indonesia (1945–1967)	Rupiah	All (5–5,000 rupiah)	Obverse	1965–1971 (except for the 2,500 and 5,000 rupiah notes, which were not issued)
Sudirman	1916–1950	1st commander-in-chief of the Indonesian Armed Forces (1945–1950)	Rupiah	All (1–10,000 rupiah)	Obverse	1968–1977
Pangeran Diponegoro	1785–1855	Prince of Java, national hero	Rupiah	Rp 1,000	Obverse	1975–1988
Soetomo	1888–1938	Doctor and politician, national hero	Rupiah	Rp 1,000	Obverse	1980–1992
Sisingamangaraja XII	1849–1907	Priest-king of Batak people in northern Sumatra, national hero	Rupiah	Rp 1,000	Obverse	1987–1995
Teuku Umar	1854–1899	Leader in a guerrilla campaign against the Dutch during the Aceh War, national hero	Rupiah	Rp 5,000	Obverse	1986–1995
Raden Adjeng Kartini	1879–1904	Women's emancipation and national heroine	Rupiah	Rp 10,000	Obverse	1985–1995
Hamengkubuwono IX	1912–1988	2nd Vice President of Indonesia (1973–1978), national hero	Rupiah	Rp 10,000	Obverse	1992–2000
Suharto	1921–2008	2nd President of Indonesia (1967–1998)	Rupiah	Rp 50,000	Obverse	1993–2000
Cut Nyak Dhien	1850–1908	Leader of the Aceh guerrilla forces during the Aceh War, national heroine	Rupiah	Rp 10,000	Obverse	1998–2008
Ki Hajar Dewantara	1889–1959	1st Minister of National Education of Indonesia (1945), national hero	Rupiah	Rp 20,000	Obverse	1998–2008
Wage Rudolf Supratman	1903–1938	Songwriter who wrote both the lyrics and melody of the national anthem of Indonesia, national hero	Rupiah	Rp 50,000	Obverse	1999–2008
Pattimura	1783–1817	Moluccan soldier; national hero	Rupiah	1000 Rp	obverse	2000–
Tjut Meutiah	1870–1910	Aceh fighter; national heroine	Rupiah	1000 Rp	obverse	2016–
Antasari	1809–1862	Sultan of Banjar; national hero	Rupiah	2000 Rp	obverse	2009–
Mohammad Husni Thamrin	1894–1941	Dutch era politician; national hero	Rupiah	2000 Rp	obverse	2016–
Tuanku Imam Bonjol	1772–1864	Leader of the Padri Movement in West Sumatra; national hero	Rupiah	5000 Rp	obverse	2001–
Idham Chalid	1921–2010	3rd Chairman of the MPR (1972–1977); national hero	Rupiah	5000 Rp	obverse	2016–
Mahmud Badaruddin II	1767–1862	8th Sultan of the Palembang Sultanate; national hero	Rupiah	10,000 Rp	obverse	2005–
Frans Kaisiepo	1921–1979	4th Governor of Papua (1964–1973); national hero	Rupiah	10,000 Rp	obverse	2016–
Oto Iskandar di Nata	1897–1945	Fighter for independence; national hero	Rupiah	20,000 Rp	obverse	2004–
Sam Ratulangi	1890–1949	Politician, journalist, and national hero	Rupiah	20,000 Rp	obverse	2016–
I Gusti Ngurah Rai	1917–1946	Commander of the Indonesian forces in Bali against the Dutch during the Indonesian War of Independence; national hero	Rupiah	50,000 Rp	obverse	2005–
Djuanda Kartawidjaja	1911–1963	10th Prime Minister of Indonesia (1957–1959); national hero	Rupiah	50,000 Rp	obverse	2016–
Sukarno and Mohammad Hatta	1901–1970 (Sukarno); 1902–1980 (Hatta)	1st President of Indonesia (1945–1967; Sukarno); 1st vice-president of Indonesia (1945–1956; Hatta); independence declaration signers, national heroes (both)	Rupiah	100,000 Rp	obverse	1999–

== Iran/Persia ==
(Iran) Currency: Toman (to 1931); Rial (since 1932)
Symbol: Rl (singular) and Rls (pl) in Latin, in Persian

Person	Lifespan	Reason for honour	Denomination	Obverse or reverse	Years of circulation
Naser al-Din Shah Qajar	1831–1896	King of Persia (1848–1896)	1 toman	obverse	1890–1923
Naser al-Din Shah Qajar	1831–1896	King of Persia (1848–1896)	2 toman	obverse	1890–1923
Naser al-Din Shah Qajar	1831–1896	King of Persia (1848–1896)	3 toman	obverse	1890–1923
Naser al-Din Shah Qajar	1831–1896	King of Persia (1848–1896)	5 toman	obverse	1890–1923
Naser al-Din Shah Qajar	1831–1896	King of Persia (1848–1896)	10 toman	obverse	1890–1923
Naser al-Din Shah Qajar	1831–1896	King of Persia (1848–1896)	20 toman	obverse	1890–1923
Naser al-Din Shah Qajar	1831–1896	King of Persia (1848–1896)	25 toman	obverse	1890–1923
Naser al-Din Shah Qajar	1831–1896	King of Persia (1848–1896)	50 toman	obverse	1890–1923
Naser al-Din Shah Qajar	1831–1896	King of Persia (1848–1896)	100 toman	obverse	1890–1923
Naser al-Din Shah Qajar	1831–1896	King of Persia (1848–1896)	500 toman	obverse	1890–1923
Naser al-Din Shah Qajar	1831–1896	King of Persia (1848–1896)	1,000 toman	obverse	Treasury reserve only
Naser al-Din Shah Qajar	1831–1896	King of Persia (1848–1896)	1 toman	obverse	1924–31
Naser al-Din Shah Qajar	1831–1896	King of Persia (1848–1896)	2 toman	obverse	1924–31
Naser al-Din Shah Qajar	1831–1896	King of Persia (1848–1896)	5 toman	obverse	1924–31
Naser al-Din Shah Qajar	1831–1896	King of Persia (1848–1896)	10 toman	obverse	1924–31
Naser al-Din Shah Qajar	1831–1896	King of Persia (1848–1896)	20 toman	obverse	1924–31
Naser al-Din Shah Qajar	1831–1896	King of Persia (1848–1896)	50 toman	obverse	1924–31
Naser al-Din Shah Qajar	1831–1896	King of Persia (1848–1896)	100 toman	obverse	1924–31
Reza Shah	1878–1944	Founded the Pahlavi dynasty	5 Rls	obverse	1932–1937
Reza Shah	1878–1944	Founded the Pahlavi dynasty	10 Rls	obverse	1932–1951
Reza Shah	1878–1944	Founded the Pahlavi dynasty	20 Rls	obverse	1932–1951
Reza Shah	1878–1944	Founded the Pahlavi dynasty	50 Rls	obverse	1932–1962
Reza Shah	1878–1944	Founded the Pahlavi dynasty	100 Rls	obverse	1932–1954
Reza Shah	1878–1944	Founded the Pahlavi dynasty	500 Rls	obverse	1932–1974
Reza Shah	1878–1944	Founded the Pahlavi dynasty	1,000 Rls	obverse	1936–1974
Mohammad Reza Shah	1919–1980	Second and last monarch of the House of Pahlavi	10 Rls	obverse	1951–1979
Mohammad Reza Shah	1919–1980	Second and last monarch of the House of Pahlavi	20 Rls	obverse	1951–1979
Mohammad Reza Shah	1919–1980	Second and last monarch of the House of Pahlavi	50 Rls	obverse	1962–1979
Mohammad Reza Shah	1919–1980	Second and last monarch of the House of Pahlavi	100 Rls	obverse	1954–1976
Mohammad Reza Shah	1919–1980	Second and last monarch of the House of Pahlavi	200 Rls	obverse	1965–1979
Mohammad Reza Shah	1919–1980	Second and last monarch of the House of Pahlavi	500 Rls	obverse	1974–1979
Mohammad Reza Shah	1919–1980	Second and last monarch of the House of Pahlavi	1,000 Rls	obverse	1974–1979
Mohammad Reza Shah	1919–1980	Second and last monarch of the House of Pahlavi	10,000 Rls	obverse	1975–1979
Reza Shah and Mohammad Reza Shah			100 Rls	obverse	1976–1979

(Iran) Currency: rial (since 1932)
Symbol:

Person	Lifespan	Reason for honor	Denomination	Obverse or reverse	Years of circulation
Hassan Modarres	1870–1937	notable supporter of the Iranian Constitutional Revolution	100 ریال	obverse	1985–
Ruhollah Khomeini	1900–1989	leader of the 1979 Iranian Revolution and 1st Supreme Leader of the Islamic Republic of Iran	1000 ریال	obverse	1992–
Ruhollah Khomeini	1900–1989	leader of the 1979 Iranian Revolution and 1st Supreme Leader of the Islamic Republic of Iran	2000 ریال	obverse	2005–
Ruhollah Khomeini	1900–1989	leader of the 1979 Iranian Revolution and 1st Supreme Leader of the Islamic Republic of Iran	5000 ریال	obverse	1993–
Ruhollah Khomeini	1900–1989	leader of the 1979 Iranian Revolution and 1st Supreme Leader of the Islamic Republic of Iran	10,000 ریال	obverse	1992–
Ruhollah Khomeini	1900–1989	leader of the 1979 Iranian Revolution and 1st Supreme Leader of the Islamic Republic of Iran	20,000 ریال	obverse	2003–
Ruhollah Khomeini	1900–1989	leader of the 1979 Iranian Revolution and 1st Supreme Leader of the Islamic Republic of Iran	50,000 ریال	obverse	2005–
Ruhollah Khomeini	1900–1989	leader of the 1979 Iranian Revolution and 1st Supreme Leader of the Islamic Republic of Iran	100,000 ریال	obverse	2010–

== Iraq ==
(Iraq) Currencies: Dinar (ID, 1932–present)

Person	Lifespan	Reason for honour	Currency	Denomination	Obverse or reverse	Years of circulation
Faisal I	1885–1933	King of Iraq (1921–1933); King of Syria (March 8 to July 24, 1920)	Dinar	All (1/4-100 dinars)	Obverse	1931–1932
King Ghazi	1912–1939	King of Iraq (1933–1939)	Dinar	All (1/4-100 dinars)	Obverse	1934–1940
Faisal II	1935–1958	King of Iraq (1939–1958)	Dinar	All (100 fils-100 dinars)	Obverse	1941–1959
Saddam Hussein	1937–2006	5th President of Iraq (1979–2003)	Dinar	5–10,000 dinars	obverse	1978–2003
Hasan Ibn al-Haytham (Alhazen)	c. 965-c. 1040	Scientist, mathematician, astronomer, and philosopher	Dinar	10,000 dinars	Obverse	2003–

== Ireland ==
(Republic of Ireland) Currencies: Pound (IR£, 1928–2002)
Euro (€, 2002–present)

Person	Lifespan	Reason for honour	Currency	Denomination	Obverse or reverse	Years of circulation
Johannes Scotus Eriugena	815–877	Theologian, philosopher and poet	Pound	£5	obverse	1975–1994
Douglas Hyde	1860–1949	1st President of the Republic of Ireland (1938–1945)	Pound	£50	obverse	1995–2002
James Joyce	1882–1941	Author and poet	Pound	£10	obverse	1993–2002
Catherine McAuley	1787–1841	Founder of the Sisters of Mercy (1831)	Pound	£5	obverse	1994–2002
Turlough O'Carolan	1670–1738	Most famous Irish bard	Pound	£50	obverse	1977–1995
Daniel O'Connell	1775–1847	A leader of Catholic Emancipation	Pound	£20	obverse	1992–2002
Charles Stewart Parnell	1846–1891	Statesman; forerunner to the modern Irish independence movement	Pound	£100	both	1995–2002
Jonathan Swift	1667–1745	Satirist and poet	Pound	£10	obverse	1976–1993
W. B. Yeats	1865–1939	Nobel Prize winner (1923)	Pound	£20	obverse	1976–1992

== Israel ==
(Israel) Currencies: Pound (IL, 1948–1980)
Old Shekel (IS, 1980–1985)
New Shekel (₪, 1985–present)

Person	Lifespan	Reason for honour	Currency	Denomination	Obverse or reverse	Years of circulation
Shmuel Yosef Agnon	1888–1970	Nobel Prize winner in Literature (1966)	New Shekel	₪50	obverse	1985–1999
David Ben-Gurion	1886–1973	1st Prime Minister of Israel (1948–1953 and 1955–1963)	Pound	IL500	obverse	1977–1984
David Ben-Gurion	1886–1973	1st Prime Minister of Israel (1948–1953 and 1955–1963)	Old Shekel	IS 50	obverse	1980–1986
Yitzhak Ben-Zvi	1884–1963	2nd President of Israel (1952–1963)	New Shekel	₪100	obverse	1986–1999
Hayyim Nahman Bialik	1873–1934	National Poet	Pound	IL10	obverse	1970–1984
Edmond James de Rothschild	1845–1934	Philanthropist; activist for Jewish affairs	Old Shekel	IS 500	obverse	1982–1986
Albert Einstein	1879–1955	Nobel Prize winner in Physics (1921)	Pound	IL5	obverse	1972–1984
Levi Eshkol	1895–1969	3rd Prime Minister of Israel (1963–1969)	Old Shekel	IS 5,000	obverse	1984–1986
Levi Eshkol	1895–1969	3rd Prime Minister of Israel (1963–1969)	New Shekel	₪5	obverse	1985–1999
Theodor Herzl	1860–1904	Founder of the Zionist movement	Pound	IL100; IS 10	obverse	1969–1984
Theodor Herzl	1860–1904	Founder of the Zionist movement	Pound	IL100; IS 10	obverse	1975–1984
Theodor Herzl	1860–1904	Founder of the Zionist movement	Old Shekel	IS 10	obverse	1980–1986
Ze'ev Jabotinsky	1880–1940	A leader in the Zionist movement	Old Shekel	IS 100	obverse	1980–1986
Maimonides	1135/8-1204	Medieval Jewish scholar	Old Shekel	IS 1,000	obverse	1983–1986
Maimonides	1135/8-1204	Medieval Jewish scholar	New Shekel	₪1	obverse	1986–1999
Golda Meir	1898–1978	4th Prime Minister of Israel (1969–1974)	Old Shekel	IS 10,000	obverse	1984–1986
Golda Meir	1898–1978	4th Prime Minister of Israel (1969–1974)	New Shekel	₪10	obverse	1985–1999
Moses Montefiore	1784–1885	Philanthropist	Pound	IL10	obverse	1975–1984
Moses Montefiore	1784–1885	Philanthropist	Old Shekel	IS 1	obverse	1980–1986
Moshe Sharett	1894–1965	2nd Prime Minister of Israel (1954–1955)	New Shekel	₪20	obverse	1988–1999
Zalman Shazar	1889–1974	3rd President of Israel (1963–1972)	New Shekel	₪200	obverse	1992–1999
Henrietta Szold	1860–1945	A leader of the Zionist movement	Pound	IL5	obverse	1976–1984
Haim Weizman	1874–1952	1st President of Israel (1949–1952)	Pound	IL50	obverse	1972–1984
Haim Weizman	1874–1952	1st President of Israel (1949–1952)	Pound	IL50	obverse	1978–1984
Haim Weizman	1874–1952	1st President of Israel (1949–1952)	Old Shekel	IS 5	obverse	1980–1986
Shmuel Yosef Agnon*	1888–1970	Nobel Prize winner in Literature (1966)	New Sheqel/Shekel	₪50	obverse	1998–
Yitzhak Ben-Zvi*	1884–1963	2nd President of Israel (1952–1963)	New Sheqel/Shekel	₪100	obverse	1998–
Moshe Sharett*	1894–1965	2nd Prime Minister of Israel (1954–1955)	New Sheqel/Shekel	₪20	obverse	1998–
Zalman Shazar*	1889–1974	3rd President of Israel (1963–1973)	New Sheqel/Shekel	₪200	obverse	1998–
Rachel Bluwstein	1890–1931	Poet	New Sheqel/Shekel	₪20	obverse	2017–
Shaul Tchernichovsky	1875–1943	Poet	New Sheqel/Shekel	₪50	obverse	2014–
Leah Goldberg	1911–1970	Poet	New Sheqel/Shekel	₪100	obverse	2017–
Nathan Alterman	1910–1970	Poet	New Sheqel/Shekel	₪200	obverse	2015–

== Italy ==
(Italy) Currencies: Lira (pl. lire: 1861–2002)
Euro (€, 2002–present)

Person	Lifespan	Reason for honour	Currency	Denomination	Obverse or reverse	Years of circulation
Vincenzo Bellini	1801–1835	opera composer	Lira	5,000 Lire	obverse	1985–2002
Gian Lorenzo Bernini	1598–1680	Baroque sculptor and architect	Lira	50,000 Lire	obverse	1985–2002
Caravaggio	1571–1610	Baroque artist	Lira	100,000 Lire	obverse	1985–2002
Guglielmo Marconi	1874–1937	Nobel Prize winner, 1909	Lira	2,000 Lire	obverse	1990–2002
Maria Montessori	1870–1952	developed the Montessori method of education	Lira	1,000 Lire	obverse	1990–2002
Raphael	1483–1520	Renaissance painter	Lira	500,000 Lire	obverse	1997–2002
Alessandro Volta	1745–1827	developer of the electric battery, 1800	Lira	10,000 Lire	obverse	1985–2002

== Jamaica ==
(Jamaica) Currency: Dollar (since 1969)
Symbol: J$

Person	Lifespan	Reason for honor	Denomination	Obverse or reverse	Years of circulation
Samuel Sharpe	1801–1832	Leader of the Jamaican Baptist War slave rebellion of 1831; National hero of Jamaica	J$50	Obverse	1988–
Samuel Sharpe	1801–1832	Leader of the Jamaican Baptist War slave rebellion of 1831; National hero of Jamaica	J$500	Obverse	2022–
George William Gordon	1820–1865	Businessman, magistrate and politician, one of two representatives to the Assembly from St. Thomas-in-the-East parish; National hero of Jamaica	J$50	Obverse	2022–
Paul Bogle	1822–1865	Baptist deacon and activist; leader of the 1865 Morant Bay protesters, who marched for justice and fair treatment for all the people in Jamaica; National hero of Jamaica	J$50	Obverse	2022–
Marcus Garvey	1887–1940	Political activist; founder and first President-General of the Universal Negro Improvement Association and African Communities League (UNIA-ACL); National hero of Jamaica	J$100	Obverse	2022–
Donald Burns Sangster	1911–1967	2nd Prime Minister of Jamaica (February 23 – April 11, 1967)	J$100	Obverse	1986–
Donald Burns Sangster	1911–1967	2nd Prime Minister of Jamaica (February 23 – April 11, 1967)	J$5,000	Obverse	2022–
Nanny of the Maroons	c.1685-c.1755	Leader of the Jamaican Maroons; National Heroine of Jamaica	J$500	Obverse	1994–
Alexander Bustamante	1884–1977	1st Prime Minister of Jamaica (1962–1967)	J$1,000	Obverse	2022–
Norman Manley	1893–1969	1st Premier of Jamaica (1959–1962)	J$1,000	Obverse	2022–
Michael Norman Manley	1924–1997	4th Prime Minister of Jamaica (1972–1980; 1989–1992)	J$1,000	Obverse	2001–
Michael Norman Manley	1924–1997	4th Prime Minister of Jamaica (1972–1980; 1989–1992)	J$2,000	Obverse	2022–
Edward Seaga	1930–2019	5th Prime Minister of Jamaica (1980–1989)	J$2,000	Obverse	2022–
Hugh Lawson Shearer	1923–2004	3rd Prime Minister of Jamaica (1967–1972)	J$5,000	Obverse	2009–

== Japan ==
(Japan) Currency: Yen (¥, 1870–Present)

Person	Lifespan	Reason for honour	Currency	Denomination	Obverse or reverse	Years of circulation
Itō Hirobumi	1841–1909	1st, 5th, 7th, and 10th Prime Minister of Japan (1885–1888 (1st); 1892–1896 (5th), 1898 (7th), 1900–1901 (10th))	Yen	¥1,000	obverse	1963–1986
Nitobe Inazo	1862–1933	Politician, economist and author	Yen	¥5,000	obverse	1984–2004
Takahashi Korekiyo	1854–1936	20th Prime Minister of Japan (1921–1922)	Yen	¥50	obverse	1951–1958
Prince Shōtoku	574–622	Regent and politician	Yen	¥100	obverse	1946–1956
Prince Shōtoku	574–622	Regent and politician	Yen	¥1,000	obverse	1950–1965
Prince Shōtoku	574–622	Regent and politician	Yen	¥5,000	obverse	1957–1986
Prince Shōtoku	574–622	Regent and politician	Yen	¥10,000	obverse	1958–1986
Ninomiya Sontoku	1787–1856	Philosopher, economist and moralist	Yen	¥1	obverse	1946–1958
Natsume Sōseki	1867–1916	Novelist	Yen	¥1,000	obverse	1984–2004
Itagaki Taisuke	1837–1919	Politician	Yen	¥100	obverse	1953–1974
Iwakura Tomomi	1825–1883	Politician	Yen	¥500	obverse	1951–1971
Iwakura Tomomi	1825–1883	Politician	Yen	¥500	obverse	1969–1994
Fukuzawa Yukichi	1835–1901	Political theorist, entrepreneur, teacher, translator and author	Yen	¥10,000	obverse	1984–2004
Hideyo Noguchi	1876–1928	Bacteriologist	Yen	¥1,000	obverse	2004–
Kitasato Shibasaburō	1853–1931	Co-discoverer of the bubonic plague in Hong Kong in 1894, together with Alexandre Yersin	Yen	¥1,000	obverse	2024–
Murasaki Shikibu	973 or 978 – 1014 or 1031	Author	Yen	¥2,000	obverse	2000–
Higuchi Ichiyō	1872–1896	Author	Yen	¥5,000	obverse	2004–
Tsuda Umeko	1864–1929	Educator; pioneer in education for women in Meiji period Japan	Yen	¥5,000	obverse	2024–
Fukuzawa Yukichi*	1835–1901	Political theorist, entrepreneur, teacher, translator and author	Yen	¥10,000	obverse	2004–
Shibusawa Eiichi	1840–1931	Industrialist; "father of Japanese capitalism"	Yen	¥10,000	obverse	2024–

== Jersey ==
(Jersey) Currency: Pound (since 1837)
Symbol: £

Person	Lifespan	Reason for honor	Denomination	Obverse or reverse	Years of circulation
Elizabeth II*	1926–2022	Queen of the United Kingdom and Head of the Commonwealth (1952–2022)	£1	obverse	1971–
Elizabeth II*	1926–2022	Queen of the United Kingdom and Head of the Commonwealth (1952–2022)	£5	obverse	1971–
Elizabeth II*	1926–2022	Queen of the United Kingdom and Head of the Commonwealth (1952–2022)	£10	obverse	1971–
Elizabeth II*	1926–2022	Queen of the United Kingdom and Head of the Commonwealth (1952–2022)	£20	obverse	1971–
Elizabeth II*	1926–2022	Queen of the United Kingdom and Head of the Commonwealth (1952–2022)	£50	obverse	1971–
Francis Peirson	1757–1781	Major in the British Army, killed in the Battle of Jersey	£10	obverse	1971–

== Jordan ==
(Jordan) Currency: Dinar (since 1950)
Symbol: دينار

Person	Lifespan	Reason for honor	Denomination	Obverse or reverse	Years of circulation
Sharif Hussein bin Ali	1854–1931	Sharif and Emir of Mecca (1908–1924); King of the Kingdom of Hejaz (1916–1924)	1 dinar	Obverse	2002–
Abdullah I bin al-Hussein	1882–1951	Emir of Transjordan (1921–1946); King of Jordan (1946–1951)	5 dinars	Obverse	2002–
Talal bin Abdullah	1909–1972	King of Jordan (1951–1952)	10 dinars	Obverse	2002–
Hussein bin Talal	1935–1999	King of Jordan (1952–1999)	20 dinars	Obverse	2002–
Abdullah II ibn al-Hussein	1962–	King of Jordan (1999–)	50 dinars	Obverse	2002–

== Katanga ==
(State of Katanga) Currency: Franc (1960–1963)

Person	Lifespan	Reason for honour	Currency	Denomination	Obverse or reverse	Years of circulation
Moise Tshombe	1919–1969	Prime Minister of Congo-Léopoldville (1964–1965)	Franc	All (10-1,000 francs)	Obverse	1960–1963

== Kazakhstan ==
(Kazakhstan) Currency: Tenge (since 1993)
Symbol:

Person	Lifespan	Reason for honor	Denomination	Obverse or reverse	Years of circulation
Al-Farabi	c.872-c.950	Scholar	1	Obverse	1993–
Suinbai Aronuly	1815–1898	Poet	3	Obverse	1993–
Kurmangazy Sagyrbayuly	1823–1896	Composer	5	Obverse	1993–
Shoqan Walikhanov	1835–1865	Scholar, ethnographer, historian and participant of The Great Game; the father of modern Kazakh historiography and ethnography	10	Obverse	1993–
Abai Qunanbaiuli	1845–1904	Poet, composer and philosopher	20	Obverse	1993–
Abul Khair Khan	1693–1748	Khan	50	Obverse	1993–
Ablai Khan	1711–1781	Khan	100	Obverse	1993–
Al-Farabi	c.872-c.950	Scholar	All (200 to 10,000)	Obverse	1994– (200, 500, and 1,000); 1996– (2,000); 1998– (5,000); 2003– (10,000)
Nursultan Äbishuly Nazarbayev	1940–	1st President of Kazakhstan (1991–2019)	10,000	Obverse	2016– (commemorative)
Nursultan Äbishuly Nazarbayev	1940–	1st President of Kazakhstan (1991–2019)	20,000	Reverse	2021– (commemorative)

== Kenya ==
(Kenya) Currency: Shilling (/=, sometimes prefixed KSh; since 1966)

Person	Lifespan	Reason for honour	Currency	Denomination	Obverse or reverse	Years of circulation
Daniel Toroitich arap Moi	1924–2020	2nd President of Kenya (1978–2002)	Shilling	All (5-1,000 shillings)	Obverse	1981–1984 (5/=); 1981–1988 (10/=); 1989–1994 (20/=); 1981–1987 (20/=); 1989–1992 (20/=); 1995–1998 (20/=); 1996–2002 (50/=); 1980–1988 (50/=); 1990 & 1992 (50/=); 1980–1988 (100/=); 1989–1995 (100/=); 1996–2002 (100/=); 1986–1988 (200/=); 1989–1994 (200/=); 1996–2002 (200/=); 1988–1995 (500/=); 1995–2001 (500/=); 1994 & 1995 (1,000/=); 1997–2002 (1,000/=)
Mzee Jomo Kenyatta	1889–1978	Prime Minister of Kenya (1963–1964); 1st President of Kenya (1964–1978); Founding father of Kenya	Shilling	50 shillings/shilingi	Obverse	1966–
Mzee Jomo Kenyatta	1889–1978	Prime Minister of Kenya (1963–1964); 1st President of Kenya (1964–1978); Founding father of Kenya	Shilling	100 shillings/shilingi	Obverse	1966–
Mzee Jomo Kenyatta	1889–1978	Prime Minister of Kenya (1963–1964); 1st President of Kenya (1964–1978); Founding father of Kenya	Shilling	200 shillings/shilingi	Obverse	2004–
Mzee Jomo Kenyatta	1889–1978	Prime Minister of Kenya (1963–1964); 1st President of Kenya (1964–1978); Founding father of Kenya	Shilling	500 shillings/shilingi	Obverse	2003–
Mzee Jomo Kenyatta	1889–1978	Prime Minister of Kenya (1963–1964); 1st President of Kenya (1964–1978); Founding father of Kenya	Shilling	1,000 shillings/shilingi	Obverse	2003–

== Korea ==
(Korea) Currency: Korean yen (엔; 1902–1945)

Person	Lifespan	Reason for honor	Currency	Denomination	Obverse or reverse	Years of circulation
Shibusawa Eiichi	1840–1931	Industrialist; known as the "Father of Japanese capitalism"	Korean yen	1, 5 and 10 yen	Obverse	1902–1910

== Kyrgyzstan ==
(Kyrgyzstan) Currency: Som (since 1993)
Symbol: сом/

Person	Lifespan	Reason for honor	Denomination	Obverse or reverse	Years of circulation
Abdylas Maldybaev	1906–1978	Composer, actor, and operatic tenor singer; one of the composers of the state anthem of the Kirghiz SSR	1 som	Obverse	1994–
Bubusara Beyshenalieva	1926–1973	Kyrgyz ballerina	5 som	Obverse	1994–
Kasym Tynystanov	1901–1938	Scientist, politician and poet	10 som	Obverse	1994–
Togolok Moldo	1860–1942	Poet, Manaschi and folk songwriter	20 som	Obverse	1994–
Kurmanjan Datka	1811–1907	Stateswoman of Kyrgyzstan, who initiated annexation of that region to Russia	50 som	Obverse	1994–
Toktogul Satylganov	1864–1933	Kyrgyz Akyns – improvising poets and singers	100 som	Obverse	1995–
Alykul Osmonov	1915–1950	Poet	200 som	Obverse	2000–
Sayakbay Karalaev	1894–1971	Manaschi – reciter of the epic Kyrgyz poem Manas	500 som	Both	2000–
Yusuf Khass Hajib	?-1085	Chancellor of the Kara-Khanid Khanate, poet	1,000 som	Obverse	2000–
Suimenkul Chokmorov	1939–1992	Actor	5,000 som	Obverse	2009–

== Laos ==
(Laos) Currency: Kip (since 1952)
Symbol: ₭ or ₭N

Person	Lifespan	Reason for honor	Denomination	Obverse or reverse	Years of circulation
Kaysone Phomvihane	1920–1992	1st Chairman of the Central Committee of the Lao People's Revolutionary Party (1955–1992); President of Laos (1991–1992)	₭2,000	Obverse	1997–
Kaysone Phomvihane	1920–1992	1st Chairman of the Central Committee of the Lao People's Revolutionary Party (1955–1992); President of Laos (1991–1992)	₭5,000	Obverse	1997–
Kaysone Phomvihane	1920–1992	1st Chairman of the Central Committee of the Lao People's Revolutionary Party (1955–1992); President of Laos (1991–1992)	₭10,000	Obverse	2002–
Kaysone Phomvihane	1920–1992	1st Chairman of the Central Committee of the Lao People's Revolutionary Party (1955–1992); President of Laos (1991–1992)	₭20,000	Obverse	2002–
Kaysone Phomvihane	1920–1992	1st Chairman of the Central Committee of the Lao People's Revolutionary Party (1955–1992); President of Laos (1991–1992)	₭50,000	Obverse	2004–
Kaysone Phomvihane	1920–1992	1st Chairman of the Central Committee of the Lao People's Revolutionary Party (1955–1992); President of Laos (1991–1992)	₭100,000	Obverse	2011–

== Latvia ==
(Latvia) Currency: Lats (Ls, 1922–1940, 1993–2014)

Person	Lifespan	Reason for honour	Denomination	Obverse or reverse	Years of circulation
Jānis Čakste	1859–1927	lawyer, politician and first President of Latvia	20 Ls	obverse	1925–1940
Krišjānis Valdemārs	1825–1891	editor, politician and folklorist	25 Ls	obverse	1928–1940
Kārlis Ulmanis	1877–1942	politician and Prime Minister of Latvia	50 Ls	obverse	1934–1940
Krišjānis Barons	1835–1923	writer, folklorist and linguist	100 Ls	obverse	1993–2014

== Lesotho ==
(Lesotho) Currency: Loti/Maloti (since 1979)
Symbol: L or M (pl.)

Person	Lifespan	Reason for honor	Denomination	Obverse or reverse	Years of circulation
King Moshoeshoe II (Constantine Bereng Seeiso)	1938–1996	King of Lesotho (1966–1996)	10 maloti	Obverse	1979–
King Moshoeshoe I	1786–1870	King of Lesotho (1822–1870)	10 maloti	Obverse	2000–
King Letsie III, King Moshoeshoe I and King Moshoeshoe II (Constantine Bereng Seeiso)	1963– (King Letsie III); 1786–1870 (King Moshoeshoe I); 1938–1996 (King Moshoeshoe II)	King of Lesotho (1996–) (King Letsie III); King of Lesotho (1822–1870) (King Moshoeshoe I); King of Lesotho (1966–1996) (King Moshoeshoe II)	10 maloti	Obverse	2009–
King Moshoeshoe II (Constantine Bereng Seeiso)	1938–1996	King of Lesotho (1966–1996)	20 maloti	Obverse	1981–
King Moshoeshoe I	1786–1870	King of Lesotho (1822–1870)	20 maloti	Obverse	1994–
King Letsie III, King Moshoeshoe I and King Moshoeshoe II (Constantine Bereng Seeiso)	1963– (King Letsie III); 1786–1870 (King Moshoeshoe I); 1938–1996 (King Moshoeshoe II)	King of Lesotho (1996–) (King Letsie III); King of Lesotho (1822–1870) (King Moshoeshoe I); King of Lesotho (1966–1996) (King Moshoeshoe II)	20 maloti	Obverse	2009–
King Moshoeshoe II (Constantine Bereng Seeiso)	1938–1996	King of Lesotho (1966–1996)	50 maloti	Obverse	1981–
King Moshoeshoe I	1786–1870	King of Lesotho (1822–1870)	50 maloti	Obverse	1992–
King Letsie III, King Moshoeshoe I and King Moshoeshoe II (Constantine Bereng Seeiso)	1963– (King Letsie III); 1786–1870 (King Moshoeshoe I); 1938–1996 (King Moshoeshoe II)	King of Lesotho (1996–) (King Letsie III); King of Lesotho (1822–1870) (King Moshoeshoe I); King of Lesotho (1966–1996) (King Moshoeshoe II)	50 maloti	Obverse	2009–
King Moshoeshoe I	1786–1870	King of Lesotho (1822–1870)	100 maloti	Obverse	1994–
King Letsie III, King Moshoeshoe I and King Moshoeshoe II (Constantine Bereng Seeiso)	1963– (King Letsie III); 1786–1870 (King Moshoeshoe I); 1938–1996 (King Moshoeshoe II)	King of Lesotho (1996–) (King Letsie III); King of Lesotho (1822–1870) (King Moshoeshoe I); King of Lesotho (1966–1996) (King Moshoeshoe II)	100 maloti	Obverse	2009–
King Moshoeshoe I	1786–1870	King of Lesotho (1822–1870)	200 maloti	Obverse	1994–
King Letsie III, King Moshoeshoe I and King Moshoeshoe II (Constantine Bereng Seeiso)	1963– (King Letsie III); 1786–1870 (King Moshoeshoe I); 1938–1996 (King Moshoeshoe II)	King of Lesotho (1996–) (King Letsie III); King of Lesotho (1822–1870) (King Moshoeshoe I); King of Lesotho (1966–1996) (King Moshoeshoe II)	200 maloti	Obverse	2016–

== Liberia ==
(Liberia) Currency: Dollar (since 1943)
Symbol: L$

Person	Lifespan	Reason for honor	Denomination	Obverse or reverse	Years of circulation
Edward James Roye	1815–1872	5th President of Liberia (1870–1871)	5 Liberian dollars	Obverse	1999–
Joseph Jenkins Roberts	1809–1876	1st President of Liberia (1848–1856); 7th President of Liberia (1872–1876)	10 Liberian dollars	Obverse	1999–
William V. S. Tubman	1895–1971	19th President of Liberia (1944–1971)	20 Liberian dollars	Obverse	1999–
Samuel Kanyon Doe	1951–1990	21st President of Liberia (1980–1990)	50 Liberian dollars	Obverse	1999–
William Richard Tolbert, Jr.	1913–1980	20th President of Liberia (1971–1980)	100 Liberian dollars	Obverse	1999–

== Libya ==
(Libya) Currency: Dinar (LD; since 1971)

Person	Lifespan	Reason for honour	Currency	Denomination	Obverse or reverse	Years of circulation
Muammar Muhammad Abu Minyar al-Gaddafi	1942–2011	Brotherly Leader and Guide of the Revolution (1969–2011)	Dinar	LD 1, LD 20 and LD 50	Obverse (LD 1 and LD 50); Reverse (LD 20)	1988–2009 (LD 1); 2002–2009 (LD 20); 2008–2012 (LD 50)
Omar Al-Mukhtār	1858–1931	Leading the native resistance to the Italian colonization of Libya	Dinar	10 dinars	Obverse	1971–

== Lithuania ==
(Lithuania) Currency: Litas (Lt, 1993–2015)

Person	Lifespan	Reason for honour	Currency	Denomination	Obverse or reverse	Years of circulation
Jonas Basanavičius	1851–1927	leader in the Lithuanian national movement; signatory of the Act of Independence (1918)	Litas	50 Lt	obverse	1993
Jonas Basanavičius	1851–1927	leader in the Lithuanian national movement; signatory of the Act of Independence (1918)	Litas	50 Lt	obverse	1993–1998
Jonas Basanavičius	1851–1927	leader in the Lithuanian national movement; signatory of the Act of Independence (1918)	Litas	50 Lt	obverse	1998–2001
Steponas Darius	1896–1933	Pilot; died in a plane crash during a trans-Atlantic flight from the United States to Lithuania	Litas	10 Lt	obverse	1993
Steponas Darius	1896–1933	Pilot; died in a plane crash during a trans-Atlantic flight from the United States to Lithuania	Litas	10 Lt	obverse	1993–1997
Steponas Darius	1896–1933	Pilot; died in a plane crash during a trans-Atlantic flight from the United States to Lithuania	Litas	10 Lt	obverse	1997–2001
Simonas Daukantas	1793–1864	Historian; wrote the first Lithuanian history books in the Lithuanian language	Litas	100 Lt	obverse	1993–2000
Stasys Girėnas	1893–1933	Pilot; died in a plane crash during a trans-Atlantic flight from the United States to Lithuania	Litas	10 Lt	obverse	1993
Stasys Girėnas	1893–1933	Pilot; died in a plane crash during a trans-Atlantic flight from the United States to Lithuania	Litas	10 Lt	obverse	1993–1997
Stasys Girėnas	1893–1933	Pilot; died in a plane crash during a trans-Atlantic flight from the United States to Lithuania	Litas	10 Lt	obverse	1997–2001
Jonas Jablonskis	1860–1930	Standardised the Lithuanian language	Litas	5 Lt	obverse	1993–1998
Maironis	1862–1932	Romantic poet; active member of the Lithuanian national movement	Litas	20 Lt	obverse	1993
Maironis	1862–1932	Romantic poet; active member of the Lithuanian national movement	Litas	20 Lt	obverse	1993–1997
Maironis	1862–1932	Romantic poet; active member of the Lithuanian national movement	Litas	20 Lt	obverse	1997–2001
Motiejus Valančius	1801–1875	A leader in the Lithuanian national movement	Litas	2 Lt	obverse	1993–1998
Vydūnas	1868–1953	Writer and philosopher; leader in the Lithuanian national movement	Litas	200 Lt	obverse	1997–2000
Žemaitė	1845–1921	Author	Litas	1 Lt	obverse	1994–1998

Person	Lifespan	Reason for honour	Denomination	Obverse or reverse	Years of circulation
Jonas Basanavičius	1851–1927	Leader in the Lithuanian national movement; signatory of the Act of Independence (1918)	50 Lt	obverse	1998–2015
Steponas Darius	1896–1933	Pilot; died in a plane crash during a trans-Atlantic flight from the United States to Lithuania	10 Lt	obverse	2001–2015
Simonas Daukantas	1793–1864	Historian; wrote the first Lithuanian history books in the Lithuanian language	100 Lt	obverse	2000–2015
Stasys Girėnas	1893–1933	Pilot; died in a plane crash during a trans-Atlantic flight from the United States to Lithuania	10 Lt	obverse	2001–2015
Vincas Kudirka	1858–1899	Poet and physician; author of the music and lyrics for the national anthem	500 Lt	obverse	2000–2015
Maironis	1862–1932	Romantic poet; active member of the Lithuanian national movement	20 Lt	obverse	2001–2015
Vydūnas	1868–1953	Writer and philosopher; leader in the Lithuanian national movement	200 Lt	obverse	1997–2015

== Luxembourg ==
(Luxembourg) Currencies: Franc (fr., 1944–2002)
Euro (€, 2002–present)

Person	Lifespan	Reason for honour	Currency	Denomination	Obverse or reverse	Years of circulation
Jean I	1921–2019	Grand Duke (1964–2000)	Franc	100 fr.	obverse	1986–2002
Jean I	1921–2019	Grand Duke (1964–2000)	Franc	1,000 fr.	obverse	1985–2002
Jean I	1921–2019	Grand Duke (1964–2000)	Franc	5,000 fr.	obverse	1993–2002

== Macau ==
(Portuguese Macau) Currency: Pataca (MOP$; since 1894)

Person	Lifespan	Reason for honour	Currency	Denomination	Obverse or reverse	Years of circulation
Luís de Camões	c. 1524-1525-1580	Poet	Pataca	All (10–500 patacas)	Obverse	1958
Belchior Carneiro Leitão	1516–1583	Jesuit missionary and bishop	Pataca	5, 10 and 500 patacas	Obverse	1963–1968
Manuel José de Arriaga Brum da Silveira e Peyrelongue	1840–1917	1st President of Portugal (1911–1915); 1st Attorney General of the Republic (1910–1911)	Pataca	100 patacas	Obverse	1952–1966
Venceslau de Morais	1854–1929	Writer, naval officer and diplomat; Known for explaining Japan in Portuguese	Pataca	500 Patacas	Obverse	1981–1984

== Malawi ==
(Malawi) Currency: Kwacha (since 1971)
Symbol: MK

Person	Lifespan	Reason for honor	Denomination	Obverse or reverse	Years of circulation
M’mbelwa II		Inkosi ya Makhosi (Paramount Chief)	20 kwacha	Obverse	2012–
Gomani II	?-1954	Inkosi ya Makhosi (Paramount Chief)	50 kwacha	Obverse	2012–
James Frederick Sangala	1900–?	Founding member of the Nyasaland African Congress	100 kwacha	Obverse	2012–
Rose Lomathinda Chibambo	1928–2016	Leader of the Nyasaland African Congress	200 kwacha	Obverse	2012–
John Chilembwe	1871–1915	Baptist pastor and educator; figure to the resistance to colonialism	500 kwacha	Obverse	2012–
Hastings Kamuzu Banda	1898–1997	1st President of Malawi (1966–1994); 1st Prime Minister of Malawi (1964–1966)	1,000 kwacha	Obverse	2012–

== Malaysia ==
(Malaysia) Currency: Malaysian ringgit (since 1967)
Symbol: RM

Person	Lifespan	Reason for honor	Denomination	Obverse or reverse	Years of circulation
Abdul Rahman of Negeri Sembilan	1895–1960	1st Yang di-Pertuan Agong (Supreme Head of State) of the Federation of Malaya	RM 1	Obverse	1967–
Abdul Rahman of Negeri Sembilan	1895–1960	1st Yang di-Pertuan Agong (Supreme Head of State) of the Federation of Malaya	RM 2	Obverse	1996–2005
Abdul Rahman of Negeri Sembilan	1895–1960	1st Yang di-Pertuan Agong (Supreme Head of State) of the Federation of Malaya	RM 5	Obverse	1967– (polymer in 1996–)
Abdul Rahman of Negeri Sembilan	1895–1960	1st Yang di-Pertuan Agong (Supreme Head of State) of the Federation of Malaya	RM 10	Obverse	1967–
Abdul Rahman of Negeri Sembilan	1895–1960	1st Yang di-Pertuan Agong (Supreme Head of State) of the Federation of Malaya	RM 20	Obverse	1982–
Abdul Rahman of Negeri Sembilan	1895–1960	1st Yang di-Pertuan Agong (Supreme Head of State) of the Federation of Malaya	RM 50	Obverse	1967–
Abdul Rahman of Negeri Sembilan	1895–1960	1st Yang di-Pertuan Agong (Supreme Head of State) of the Federation of Malaya	RM 100	Obverse	1967–
Abdul Rahman of Negeri Sembilan	1895–1960	1st Yang di-Pertuan Agong (Supreme Head of State) of the Federation of Malaya	RM 500	Obverse	1982–1999
Abdul Rahman of Negeri Sembilan	1895–1960	1st Yang di-Pertuan Agong (Supreme Head of State) of the Federation of Malaya	RM 1,000	Obverse	1967–1999
Tunku Abdul Rahman	1903–1990	1st Prime Minister of Malaysia	RM 50	Reverse	2007– (commemorative)
Tunku Abdul Rahman	1903–1990	1st Prime Minister of Malaysia	RM 50	Reverse	2009–

== Mali ==
(Mali) Currency: Malian franc (MAF; 1962–1984)

Person	Lifespan	Reason for honour	Currency	Denomination	Obverse or reverse	Years of circulation
Modibo Keïta	1915–1977	1st President of Mali (1960–1968)	Malian franc	All (50-5000 francs)	Obverse	1960

== Malta ==
(Malta) Currency: Lira (pl. liri: Lm; 1825–2007)

Person	Lifespan	Reason for honour	Currency	Denomination	Obverse or reverse	Years of circulation
Agatha Barbara	1923–2002	3rd President of Malta (1982–1987)	Lira	All (2–20 liri)	Obverse	1986–2000
George Borg Olivier	1911–1980	7th Prime Minister of Malta (1950–1955 and 1962–1971)	Lira	Lm 20	Reverse	1989–2008

== Mauritius ==
(Mauritius) Currency: Rupee (since 1876)
Symbol: ₨

Person	Lifespan	Reason for honor	Denomination	Obverse or reverse	Years of circulation
Moilin Jean Ah-Chuen	1911–1991	Politician	25 rupees	Obverse	1998–
Joseph Maurice Paturau	1916–1996	Industrialist, pioneer of sugar industry, aviation and tourism, cabinet minister, hero of World War II	50 rupees	Obverse	1998–
Renganaden Seeneevassen	1910-1958	First Mauritanian Minister of Education	100 rupees	Obverse	1998–
Abdool Razack Mohamed	1906–1978	Deputy Prime Minister of Mauritius (1967–1978)	200 rupees	Obverse	1998–
Sookdeo Bissoondoyal	1908–1977	Mauritian politician; one of the leading figures of the independence movement	500 rupees	Obverse	1998–
Charles Gaëtan Duval	1930–1996	Deputy Prime Minister of Mauritius (1983–1988)	1,000 rupees	Obverse	1998–
Seewoosagur Ramgoolam	1900–1985	1st Chief Minister of Mauritius (1963–1968); Prime Minister of Mauritius (1976–1982); Chairman of the Organisation of African Unity (1976–1977); Governor-General of Mauritius (1983–1985)	2,000 rupees	Obverse	1998–

== Mexico ==
(Mexico) Currency: Peso ($, 1821–Present)

Person	Lifespan	Reason for honour	Currency	Denomination	Obverse or reverse	Years of circulation
Doña Josefa Ortiz de Domínguez (La Corregidora)	1773–1829	Insurgent and supporter of the Mexican War of Independence	Old Mexican peso	$5 and $20	obverse	1937–1970 ($20); 1969–1972 ($5)
Ignacio Zaragoza Seguín	1829–1862	General of the Mexican Army and politician; for defeating the invading French forces at the Battle of Puebla	Old Mexican peso	$50	obverse	1937–1940
Ignacio José de Allende y Unzaga	1769–1811	Captain of the Spanish Army who came to sympathize the Mexican independence movement	Old Mexican peso	$50	obverse	1941–1945
Francisco Ignacio Madero González	1873–1913	33rd President of Mexico (1911–1913)	Old Mexican peso	$100 and $500	obverse	1936–1942 ($100); 1979–1984 ($500)
Miguel Hidalgo y Costilla	1753–1811	Leader of the Mexican War of Independence	Old Mexican peso	$10, $100	obverse	1945–1973 ($100); 1969–1977 ($10)
José María Teclo Morelos Pérez y Pavón	1765–1815	Leader of the Mexican War of Independence after the execution of Miguel Hidalgo y Costa; Member of the Council of Zitacuaro (1811–1813); Chief of the Congress of Anáhuac (1813–1814); President of the Supreme Mexican Government (1814–1815)	Old Mexican peso	$20 and $500	obverse	1940–1948 ($500); 1972–1977 ($20)
Cuauhtémoc	c.1497–1521	Aztec ruler (tlatoani) of Tenochtitlan (1520–1521)	Old Mexican peso	$1,000 and $50,000	obverse	1941–1977 ($1,000); 1986–1990 ($50,000)
Matías Romero Avendaño	1837–1898	Secretary of Finance (first term; 1868–1872; second term; 1877–1879; third term; March 26 – December 31, 1892); Ambassador of Mexico to the United States (First term; 1863–1868; second term; 1893–1898)	Old Mexican peso	$10,000	obverse	1943–1978
Benito Pablo Juárez García	1806–1872	26th President of Mexico (1858–1872)	Old Mexican peso	$50	obverse	1973–1981
Venustiano Carranza Garza	1859–1920	37th President of Mexico (1917–1920)	Old Mexican peso	$100	obverse	1974–1982
Juana Inés de la Cruz	1651–1695	Nun, scholar and poet	Old Mexican peso	$1,000	obverse	1978–1985
Justo Sierra Méndez	1848–1912	Writer, historian, journalist, poet and political figure	Old Mexican peso	$2,000	obverse	1983–1989
Juan de la Barrera, Juan Escutia, Francisco Márquez, Agustín Melgar, Fernando Montes de Oca and Vicente Suárez	1828–1847 (Juan de la Barrera); 1828–1847 (Juan Escutia); 1834–1847 (Francisco Márquez); 1828–1847 (Agustín Melgar); 1828–1847 (Fernando Montes de Oca); 1833–1847 (Vicente Suárez)	Defending Mexico at Mexico City's Chapultepec Castle from invading U.S. forces in the September 13, 1847 Battle of Chapultepec, during the Mexican–American War	Old Mexican peso	$5,000	obverse	1980–1989
Lázaro Cárdenas del Río	1895–1970	44th President of Mexico (1934–1940); Nationalization of the oil industry of Mexico in 1938	Old Mexican peso	$10,000	obverse	1981–1991
Andrés Quintana Roo	1787–1851	Liberal politician, lawyer and author	Old Mexican peso	$20,000	obverse	1985–1989
Plutarco Elías Calles	1877–1945	40th President of Mexico (1924–1928)	Old Mexican peso	$100,000	obverse	1988–1991
Emiliano Zapata	1879–1919	Leader in the Mexican Revolution (1910–1919)	Mexican nuevo peso (new peso)/peso	$10	both	1993–1997
Sor Juana Inés de la Cruz	1648/51-1695	Nun, scholar and poet	Peso	$200	obverse	1994–
Sor Juana Inés de la Cruz	1648/51-1695	Nun, scholar and poet	Peso	$100	obverse	2020–
Miguel Hidalgo	1753–1811	Catholic priest; leader of Mexico's struggle for independence	Peso	$1,000	obverse	2004–
Miguel Hidalgo	1753–1811	Catholic priest; leader of Mexico's struggle for independence	Peso	$200	obverse	2018–
Benito Juárez	1806–1872	26th President of Mexico (1858–1872)	Peso	$20	both (1996 paper and 2002 polymer issue); obverse (Series F)	1996– (polymer in 2002–)
Benito Juárez	1806–1872	26th President of Mexico (1858–1872)	Peso	$500	both	2018–
José María Morelos	1765–1815	leader for Mexican independence	Peso	$50	obverse	1996– (polymer in 2006–)
José María Morelos	1765–1815	leader for Mexican independence	Peso	$200	obverse	2018–
Nezahualcoyotl	1402–1472	Texcocan king	Peso	$100	obverse	1994–
Diego Rivera and Frida Kahlo	1886–1957; 1907-1954	Artists and Communist Party militants	Peso	$500	obverse	2010–
Venustiano Carranza	1859–1920	37th President of Mexico (1917–1920)	Peso	$100	obverse	2017– (commemorative)
Luis Manuel Rojas	1871–1949	Journalist and politician, President of the Mexican Constituent Congress (1916–1917)	Peso	$100	obverse	2017– (commemorative)
Francisco I. Madero	1873–1913	37th President of Mexico (1911–1913)	Peso	$1000	obverse	2019–
Hermila Galindo	1886–1954	Journalist and activist	Peso	$1000	obverse	2019–
Carmen Serdán	1875–1948	Revolutionary	Peso	$1000	obverse	2019–

== Moldova ==
(Moldova) Currency: Leu (pl. Lei) (since 1992)
Symbol: L

Person	Lifespan	Reason for honor	Denomination	Obverse or reverse	Years of circulation
Stephen III (the Great)	1433–1504	Prince of the Principality of Moldavia (1457–1504) and Saint of the Romanian Orthodox Church	All (1-1,000 lei)	Obverse	1992–

== Mongolia ==
(Mongolia) Currency: Tögrög/Tugrik (since 1925)
Symbol: ₮

Person	Lifespan	Reason for honor	Denomination	Obverse or reverse	Years of circulation
Damdin Sükhbaatar	1893–1923	Founding member of the Mongolian People's Party, leader of the Mongolian partisan army, Father of the Mongolian Revolution	₮5	Obverse	1939–
Damdin Sükhbaatar	1893–1923	Founding member of the Mongolian People's Party, leader of the Mongolian partisan army, Father of the Mongolian Revolution	₮10	Obverse	1939–
Damdin Sükhbaatar	1893–1923	Founding member of the Mongolian People's Party, leader of the Mongolian partisan army, Father of the Mongolian Revolution	₮20	Obverse	1981–
Damdin Sükhbaatar	1893–1923	Founding member of the Mongolian People's Party, leader of the Mongolian partisan army, Father of the Mongolian Revolution	₮50	Obverse	1939–
Damdin Sükhbaatar	1893–1923	Founding member of the Mongolian People's Party, leader of the Mongolian partisan army, Father of the Mongolian Revolution	₮100	Obverse	1939–
Genghis Khan	1162–1227	Founder and Great Khan (emperor) of the Mongol Empire (1206–1227)	₮500	Obverse	1993–
Genghis Khan	1162–1227	Founder and Great Khan (emperor) of the Mongol Empire (1206–1227)	₮1,000	Obverse	1993–
Genghis Khan	1162–1227	Founder and Great Khan (emperor) of the Mongol Empire (1206–1227)	₮5,000	Obverse	1994–
Genghis Khan	1162–1227	Founder and Great Khan (emperor) of the Mongol Empire (1206–1227)	₮10,000	Obverse	1995–
Genghis Khan	1162–1227	Founder and Great Khan (emperor) of the Mongol Empire (1206–1227)	₮20,000	Obverse	2006–

== Morocco ==
(Morocco) Currency: Dirham (since 1960)
Symbol: د.م.

Person	Lifespan	Reason for honor	Denomination	Obverse or reverse	Years of circulation
Mohammed VI	1963–	King of Morocco (1999–)	20 dirhams	Obverse	2002–
Mohammed VI	1963–	King of Morocco (1999–)	20 dirhams	Obverse	2013–
Mohammed VI	1963–	King of Morocco (1999–)	50 dirhams	Obverse	2002–
Mohammed VI	1963–	King of Morocco (1999–)	50 dirhams	Obverse	2013–
Mohammed VI, Mohammed V and Hassan II	1963– (Mohammed VI); 1909–1961 (Mohammed V); 1929–1999 (Hassan II)	King of Morocco (1927–1961) (Mohammed V); King of Morocco (1961–1999) (Hassan II); King of Morocco (1999–) (Mohammed VI)	100 dirhams	Obverse	2002–
Mohammed VI	1963–	King of Morocco (1999–)	100 dirhams	Obverse	2012–
Mohammed VI and Hassan II	1963– (Mohammed VI); 1929–1999 (Hassan II)	King of Morocco (1999–) (Mohammed VI); King of Morocco (1961–1999) (Hassan II)	200 dirhams	Obverse	2002–
Mohammed VI	1963–	King of Morocco (1999–)	200 dirhams	Obverse	2012–

== Mozambique ==
(Mozambique) Currency: Metical (since 1980)
Symbol: MT

Person	Lifespan	Reason for honor	Denomination	Obverse or reverse	Years of circulation
Samora Moisés Machel	1933–1986	Military commander, revolutionary, socialist leader and President of Mozambique (1975–1986)	20 meticais	Obverse	2006–
Samora Moisés Machel	1933–1986	Military commander, revolutionary, socialist leader and President of Mozambique (1975–1986)	50 meticais	Obverse	2006–
Samora Moisés Machel	1933–1986	Military commander, revolutionary, socialist leader and President of Mozambique (1975–1986)	100 meticais	Obverse	2006–
Samora Moisés Machel	1933–1986	Military commander, revolutionary, socialist leader and President of Mozambique (1975–1986)	200 meticais	Obverse	2006–
Samora Moisés Machel	1933–1986	Military commander, revolutionary, socialist leader and President of Mozambique (1975–1986)	500 meticais	Obverse	2006–
Samora Moisés Machel	1933–1986	Military commander, revolutionary, socialist leader and President of Mozambique (1975–1986)	1,000 meticais	Obverse	2006–

== Namibia ==
(Namibia) Currency: Dollar (since 1993)
Symbol: N$

Person	Lifespan	Reason for honor	Denomination	Obverse or reverse	Years of circulation
Hendrik Witbooi	1830–1905	Leader of the Nama people during the Herero and Nama genocide; National hero of Namibia	All (10 to 200 Namibian dollars)	Obverse	1993– and 2012–
Sam Nujoma	1929–2025	1st President of Namibia (1990–2005)	10 and 20 Namibian dollars	Obverse	2012–
Hendrik Witbooi	1830–1905	Leader of the Nama people during the Herero and Nama genocide; National hero of Namibia	50-, 100 and 200 Namibian dollars	Obverse	2012–
Sam Nujoma	1929–2025	1st President of Namibia (1990–2005)	30 Namibian dollars	Obverse	2020– (commemorative)
Hifikepunye Lucas Pohamb	1936–	2nd President of Namibia (2005–2015)	30 Namibian dollars	Obverse	2020– (commemorative)
Hage Gottfried Geingob	1941–2024	3rd President of Namibia (2015–)	30 Namibian dollars	Obverse	2020– (commemorative)

== Nepal ==
(Nepal) Currency: Mohru/Rupee (Rs.; since 1932)

Person	Lifespan	Reason for honour	Currency	Denomination	Obverse or reverse	Years of circulation
Tribhuvan Bir Bikram Shah	1903–1955	King of Nepal (1911–1950)	Nepalese mohru/rupee	5, 10 and 100 mohru/rupees	Obverse	1945–1955
Mahendra Bir Bikram Shah	1920–1972	King of Nepal (1955–1972)	Nepalese rupee	All (1-1,000 rupees)	Obverse	1956–1972
Birendra Bir Bikram Shah	1944–2001	King of Nepal (1972–2001)	Nepalese rupee	All (1-1,000 rupees)	Obverse	1974–2001
Gyanendra Bir Bikram Shah	1947–	King of Nepal (2001–2008)	Nepalese rupee	All (5-1,000 rupees)	Obverse	2002–2006

== Netherlands ==
(Netherlands) Currencies: Guilder (florin) (ƒ, 1817–2002)
Euro (€, 2002–present)

Person	Lifespan	Reason for honour	Currency	Denomination	Obverse or reverse	Years of circulation
Herman Boerhave	1668-1738	Dutch botanist and physician	Guilder	ƒ20	obverse	1955-1960
Hugo de Groot	1583-1645	Dutch philosopher and jurist	Guilder	ƒ10	obverse	1953–1971
Desiderius Erasmus	1469-1536	Dutch humanist and philosopher	Guilder	ƒ100	obverse	1953-1972
Christiaan Huygens	1629-1695	Dutch mathematician and physicist	Guilder	ƒ25	obverse	1955–1972
Michiel de Ruyter	1607–1676	Admiral of the Dutch navy during the Anglo-Dutch Wars (1652–1676)	Guilder	ƒ100	obverse	1972–1981
Frans Hals	1580–1666	Painter	Guilder	ƒ10	obverse	1971–1977
Baruch Spinoza	1632–1677	Rationalist philosopher	Guilder	ƒ1,000	obverse	1973–1996
Jan Pieterszoon Sweelinck	1562-1621	Composer, organist and teacher	Guilder	ƒ25	obverse	1972–1990
Joost van den Vondel	1587–1697	Writer and playwright	Guilder	ƒ5	obverse	1966–1973
Joost van den Vondel	1587–1697	Writer and playwright	Guilder	ƒ5	obverse	1973–1988
Rembrandt van Rijn	1606-1669	Dutch painter	Guilder	ƒ1,000	obverse	1956-1972

== New Zealand ==
(New Zealand) Currency: Dollar (since 1967)
Symbol: $

Person	Lifespan	Reason for honor	Denomination	Obverse or reverse	Years of circulation
Elizabeth II	1926–2022	Queen and Head of State of New Zealand since 1952, and leader of the Commonwealth of Nations.	$20	Obverse	1967–
Sir Edmund Hillary	1919–2008	Mountaineer and explorer. First person to reach the summit of Mount Everest (1953), and first person to drive overland to the South Pole (1958). Later known for his community work in Nepal.	$5	Obverse	1990–
Āpirana Ngata	1874–1950	Played a significant role in the revival of Māori people and culture during the early 20th century. First Māori graduate for a New Zealand University, and Member of Parliament for 38 years.	$50	Obverse	1990–
Lord Rutherford of Nelson	1871–1937	New Zealand physicist and 'father of the atom'; explaining the perplexing problem of naturally occurring radioactivity, determining the structure of the atom, and changing one element into another. Awarded the Nobel Prize in Chemistry in 1908.	$100	Obverse	1990–
Kate Sheppard	1848–1934	Prominent suffragette, who led the campaign for woman's right to vote. This determination led to New Zealand being the first sovereign state to allow woman to vote, in 1893.	$10	Obverse	1990–

== Nicaragua ==
(Nicaragua) Currency: Córdoba (since 1991)
Symbol: C$

Person	Lifespan	Reason for honor	Denomination	Obverse or reverse	Years of circulation
Miguel Larreynaga	1772–1842	Philosopher, humanist, lawyer and poet	C$10	Obverse	2002–
José Santos Zelaya López	1853–1919	President of Nicaragua (1893–1909)	C$20	Obverse	2002–
Pedro Joaquín Chamorro Cardenal	1924–1978	Journalist and publisher	C$50	Obverse	2002–
Félix Rubén García Sarmiento	1867–1916	Poet, journalist, diplomat, and writer	C$100	Obverse	2002–
José Dolores Estrada Vado	1792–1869	National hero of Nicaragua	C$500	Obverse	2002–
Félix Rubén García Sarmiento	1867–1916	Poet, journalist, diplomat and writer	C$1,000	Obverse	2016– (commemorative)

== Nigeria ==
(Nigeria) Currency: Naira (since 1973)
Symbol: ₦

Person	Lifespan	Reason for honor	Denomination	Obverse or reverse	Years of circulation
Alhaji Abubakar Tafawa Balewa	1912–1966	Prime Minister of Nigeria (1960–1966)	₦5	Obverse	2006–
Alvan Ikoku	1900–1971	Educator, statesman, activist and politician	₦10	Obverse	2006–
Murtala Mohammed	1938–1976	4th Head of State of Nigeria (1975–1976)	₦20	Obverse	2006–
Ladi Kwali	1925–1984	Potter	₦20	Obverse	2006–
Obafemi Awolowo	1909–1987	Premier of Western Nigeria (1954–1960)	₦100	Obverse	1999–
Ahmadu Bello	1910–1966	Premier of Northern Nigeria (1954–1966)	₦200	Obverse	2000–
Benjamin Nnamdi Azikiwe	1904–1966	1st President of Nigeria (1963–1966)	₦500	Obverse	2001–
Aliyu Mai-Bornu and Clement Nyong Isong	1919–1970 (Aliyu Mai-Bornu); 1920–2000 (Clement Nyong Isong)	Governor of the Central Bank of Nigeria (1963–1967; Aliyu Mai-Bornu); Governor of the Central Bank of Nigeria (1967–1975; Clement Nyong Isong)	₦1,000	Obverse	2005–

== North Korea ==
(North Korea) Currency: Second North Korean won (₩; 1959–2009)

Person	Lifespan	Reason for honour	Currency	Denomination	Obverse or reverse	Years of circulation
Hong Yong-hee		Actress; known for the title role as The Flower Girl	Second North Korean won	₩1	Obverse	1992–2009
Kim Il Sung	1912–1994	Founder of the Democratic People's Republic of Korea (North Korea); Supreme Commander of the Korean People's Army (1950–1991); Chairman of the National Defence Commission (1972–1993); Chairman of the North Korea Bureau of the Communist Party of Korea (1945–1946); Deputy Chairman of the Central Committee of the Workers’ Party of North Korea (1946–1949); Chairman of the Central Committee of the Workers' Party of Korea (1949–1966); General Secretary of the Central Committee of the Workers' Party of Korea (1966–1994); Deputy to the 1st, 2nd, 3rd, 4th, 5th, 6th, 7th, 8th and 9th Supreme People's Assembly (1948–1994); Premier of North Korea (1948–1972); President of North Korea (1972–1994); Eternal President of the Republic/Eternal leader of the Democratic People's Republic of Korea (1998–)	Second North Korean won	₩100, ₩1,000 and ₩5,000	Obverse	1992–2009 (₩100); 2002–2009 (₩1,000 and ₩5,000)
Kim Il Sung	1912–1994	Founder of the Democratic People's Republic of Korea (North Korea); Supreme Commander of the Korean People's Army (1950–1991); Chairman of the National Defence Commission (1972–1993); Chairman of the North Korea Bureau of the Communist Party of Korea (1945–1946); Deputy Chairman of the Central Committee of the Workers’ Party of North Korea (1946–1949); Chairman of the Central Committee of the Workers' Party of Korea (1949–1966); General Secretary of the Central Committee of the Workers' Party of Korea (1966–1994); Deputy to the 1st, 2nd, 3rd, 4th, 5th, 6th, 7th, 8th and 9th Supreme People's Assembly (1948–1994); Premier of North Korea (1948–1972); President of North Korea (1972–1994); Eternal President of the Republic/Eternal leader of the Democratic People's Republic of Korea (1998–)	Won	₩5000	obverse	2009–

== Norway ==
(Norway) Currency: Krone (kr, 1877–Present)

Person	Lifespan	Reason for honour	Currency	Denomination	Obverse or reverse	Years of circulation
Niels Henrik Abel	1802–1829	Mathematician	Krone	500 kr	obverse	1948–2002
Niels Henrik Abel	1802–1829	Mathematician	Krone	500 kr	obverse	1978–2002
Bjørnstjerne Bjørnson	1832–1910	Nobel Prize winner for Literature (1903)	Krone	50 kr	obverse	1950–1999
Bjørnstjerne Bjørnson	1832–1910	Nobel Prize winner for Literature (1903)	Krone	50 kr	obverse	1966–1999
Wilhelm Frimann Koren Christie	1779–1849	Speaker of the Storting (1815 and 1818)	Krone	5 kr	obverse	1901–1945
Wilhelm Frimann Koren Christie	1779–1849	Speaker of the Storting (1815 and 1818)	Krone	10 kr	obverse	1901–1945
Wilhelm Frimann Koren Christie	1779–1849	Speaker of the Storting (1815 and 1818)	Krone	50 kr	obverse	1901–1945
Wilhelm Frimann Koren Christie	1779–1849	Speaker of the Storting (1815 and 1818)	Krone	100 kr	obverse	1901–1945
Wilhelm Frimann Koren Christie	1779–1849	Speaker of the Storting (1815 and 1818)	Krone	500 kr	obverse	1901–1945
Wilhelm Frimann Koren Christie	1779–1849	Speaker of the Storting (1815 and 1818)	Krone	1,000 kr	obverse	1901–1945
Camilla Collett	1813–1885	Writer	Krone	100 kr	obverse	1979–1997
Christian Magnus Falsen	1782–1830	Co-author of the Constitution (1814)	Krone	1,000 kr	obverse	1991–2001
Edvard Grieg	1843–1907	Composer and pianist	Krone	500 kr	obverse	1991–2000
Henrik Ibsen	1828–1906	Playwright; known as "The Father of Modern Drama"	Krone	1,000 kr	obverse	1949–1999
Henrik Ibsen	1828–1906	Playwright; known as "The Father of Modern Drama"	Krone	1,000 kr	obverse	1975–2001
Christian Michelsen	1857–1925	Prime Minister of Norway (1905–1907)	Krone	10 kr	obverse	1954–1999
Fridtjof Nansen	1861–1930	Nobel Prize winner for Peace (1922)	Krone	5 kr	obverse	1955–1999
Fridtjof Nansen	1861–1930	Nobel Prize winner for Peace (1922)	Krone	10 kr	obverse	1972–1999
Oscar II	1829–1907	King of Norway (1872–1905)	Krone	5 kr	obverse	1877–1998
Oscar II	1829–1907	King of Norway (1872–1905)	Krone	10 kr	obverse	1877–1998
Oscar II	1829–1907	King of Norway (1872–1905)	Krone	50 kr	obverse	1877–1998
Oscar II	1829–1907	King of Norway (1872–1905)	Krone	100 kr	obverse	1877–1998
Oscar II	1829–1907	King of Norway (1872–1905)	Krone	500 kr	obverse	1877–1998
Oscar II	1829–1907	King of Norway (1872–1905)	Krone	1,000 kr	obverse	1877–1998
Peder Tordenskjold	1691–1720	Vice-Admiral; hero from the Great Northern War	Krone	10 kr	obverse	1901–1945
Peder Tordenskjold	1691–1720	Vice-Admiral; hero from the Great Northern War	Krone	100 kr	obverse	1901–1945
Peder Tordenskjold	1691–1720	Vice-Admiral; hero from the Great Northern War	Krone	1,000 kr	obverse	1901–1945
Aasmund Olavsson Vinje	1818–1870	Poet and journalist	Krone	50 kr	obverse	1985–1997
Henrik Wergeland	1808–1845	Poet and writer	Krone	100 kr	obverse	1949–1999
Henrik Wergeland	1808–1845	Poet and writer	Krone	100 kr	obverse	1962–1999
Peter Christen Asbjørnsen	1812–1885	Writer and scholar; collector of Norwegian folklore	Krone	50 kr	obverse	1997–
Kirsten Flagstad	1895–1962	opera singer	Krone	100 kr	obverse	1997–
Kristian Birkeland	1867–1917	scientist	Krone	200 kr	obverse	1994–
Sigrid Undset	1882–1949	Nobel Prize winner for Literature (1928)	Krone	500 kr	obverse	1999–
Edvard Munch	1863–1944	Expressionist painter	Krone	1,000 kr	obverse	2001–

== Oman ==
(Oman) Currency: Rial (since 1970)
Symbol: ريال

Person	Lifespan	Reason for honor	Denomination	Obverse or reverse	In Circulation since
Qaboos bin Said al Said	1940–2020	Sultan of Oman (1970–2020)	100 baisa	Obverse	1995
Qaboos bin Said al Said	1940–2020	Sultan of Oman (1970–2020)	200 baisa	Obverse	1995
Qaboos bin Said al Said	1940–2020	Sultan of Oman (1970–2020)	1/2 Rial	Obverse	1995
Qaboos bin Said al Said	1940–2020	Sultan of Oman (1970–2020)	1 Rial	Obverse	1995
Qaboos bin Said al Said	1940–2020	Sultan of Oman (1970–2020)	5 Rials	Obverse	1995
Qaboos bin Said al Said	1940–2020	Sultan of Oman (1970–2020)	10 Rials	Obverse	1995
Qaboos bin Said al Said	1940–2020	Sultan of Oman (1970–2020)	20 Rials	Obverse	1995
Qaboos bin Said al Said	1940–2020	Sultan of Oman (1970–2020)	50 Rials	Obverse	1995

Person	Lifespan	Reason for honor	Denomination	Obverse or reverse	Years of circulation
Haitham bin Tariq	1955–	Sultan of Oman (2020–present)	5 Rials	Obverse	2020–
Haitham bin Tariq	1955–	Sultan of Oman (2020–present)	10 Rials	Obverse	2020–
Haitham bin Tariq	1955–	Sultan of Oman (2020–present)	20 Rials	Obverse	2020–

== Pakistan ==
(Pakistan) Currency: Rupee (Re (singular) and Rs (pl), 1947–present)

Person	Lifespan	Reason for honour	Currency	Denomination	Obverse or reverse	Years of circulation
Muhammad Ali Jinnah	1876–1948	1st Governor-General of Pakistan (1947–1948); "Father of the Nation"	Rupee	Rs 5/-	obverse	1997–2002
Muhammad Ali Jinnah	1876–1948	1st Governor-General of Pakistan (1947–1948); "Father of the Nation"	Rupee	Rs. 10	obverse	2006–
Muhammad Ali Jinnah	1876–1948	1st Governor-General of Pakistan (1947–1948); "Father of the Nation"	Rupee	Rs. 20	obverse	2005–
Muhammad Ali Jinnah	1876–1948	1st Governor-General of Pakistan (1947–1948); "Father of the Nation"	Rupee	Rs. 50	obverse	1977–
Muhammad Ali Jinnah	1876–1948	1st Governor-General of Pakistan (1947–1948); "Father of the Nation"	Rupee	Rs. 100	obverse	2006–
Muhammad Ali Jinnah	1876–1948	1st Governor-General of Pakistan (1947–1948); "Father of the Nation"	Rupee	Rs. 500	obverse	2006–
Muhammad Ali Jinnah	1876–1948	1st Governor-General of Pakistan (1947–1948); "Father of the Nation"	Rupee	Rs. 1,000	obverse	2007–
Muhammad Ali Jinnah	1876–1948	1st Governor-General of Pakistan (1947–1948); "Father of the Nation"	Rupee	Rs. 5,000	obverse	2006–

== Panama ==
(Panama) Currency: Balboa (B/.; since 1904)

Person	Lifespan	Reason for honour	Currency	Denomination	Obverse or reverse	Years of circulation
Vasco Núñez de Balboa	1475–1519	Explorer, governor, and conquistador; best known for having crossed the Isthmus of Panama to the Pacific Ocean in 1513, becoming the first European to lead an expedition to have seen or reached the Pacific from the New World	Balboa	B/.1	Obverse	1941

== Papua New Guinea ==
(Papua New Guinea) Currency: Kina (since 1975)
Symbol: K

Person	Lifespan	Reason for honor	Denomination	Obverse or reverse	In Circulation since
Michael Somare	1936–2021	Prime Minister of Papua New Guinea (1975–2011)	50 kina	Reverse	1999

== Paraguay ==
(Paraguay) Currency: Guaraní (since 1943)
Symbol:

Person	Lifespan	Reason for honor	Denomination	Obverse or reverse	In Circulation since
Adela and Celsa Speratti	1865–1902 and 1868–1938	Founded the first Normal Schools in the country	2,000	Obverse	2008
Carlos Antonio López	1792–1862	Consul of Paraguay (1841–1844); 1st President of Paraguay (1844–1862)	5,000	Obverse	1962
José Gaspar Rodríguez de Francia	1766–1840	Consul of Paraguay (1813–1814; 1814–1840)	10,000	Obverse	1962
Agustín Pío Barrios	1885–1944	Classical guitarist and composer	50,000	Obverse	1981
Roque González de Santa Cruz	1576–1628	Patron saint of Paraguay	100,000	Obverse	1998

== Peru ==
(Peru) Currency: Nuevo sol/Sol (since 1991)
Symbol: S/.

Person	Lifespan	Reason for honor	Currency	Denomination	Obverse or reverse	Years of circulation
José Quiñones Gonzales	1914–1941	National aviation hero	Nuevo sol/sol	S/. 10	obverse	1991––
María Isabel Granda Larco (Chabuca Granda)	1920–1983	Singer and composer	Nuevo sol/sol	S/. 10	obverse	2021––
Raúl Porras Barrenechea	1897–1960	Minister of Foreign Affairs, Historian and Senator	Nuevo sol/sol	S/. 20	obverse	1991––
José María Arguedas Altamirano	1911–1969	Novelist, poet, and anthropologist	Nuevo sol/sol	S/. 20	obverse	2021––
Abraham Valdelomar	1888–1919	Poet	Nuevo sol/sol	S/. 50	obverse	1991––
María Rostworowski	1915–2016	Historian and social researcher	Nuevo sol/sol	S/. 50	obverse	2021––
Jorge Basadre	1903–1980	Minister of education; Historian	Nuevo sol/sol	S/. 100	obverse	1991––
Pedro Paulet	1874–1945	Diplomat and scientist	Nuevo sol/sol	S/. 100	obverse	2021––
Rose of Lima	1586–1617	Saint Rose of Lima, First catholic saint of the Americas	Nuevo sol/sol	S/. 200	obverse	1995––
Tilsa Tsuchiya	1928–1984	Printmaker and painter	Nuevo sol/sol	S/. 200	obverse	2021––

== Philippines ==
(Philippines) Currency: Peso (₱; since 1903)

Person	Lifespan	Reason for honor	Currency	Denomination	Obverse or reverse	Years of circulation
Isabel II	1830–1904	Queen of Spain (1833–1868)	Philippine peso fuerte	All (10–200 pesos fuertes)	Obverse	1852–1898
Charles A. Conant	1861–1915	Journalist, author, and promoter; recognized as an expert on banking and finance	Peso	₱1	Obverse	1916–1924 (Philippine National Bank)
Apolinario Mabini	1864–1903	1st Prime Minister of the Philippines (January 23 – May 7, 1899); responsible for drafting the Constitution of the Philippines	Peso/Piso	₱1 and ₱10	Obverse	1918–1929 (Philippine Islands Treasury Certificate); 1936–1941 (Commonwealth Treasury Certificate); 1944 ("Victory" overprint); 1949–1969 (Central Bank of the Philippines); 1969 ("Pilipino" series); 1970 ("Pilipino" series; full printing); 1970–1978 ("Ang Bagong Lipunan" series); 1985–1997 ("New Design/BSP" series)
José Rizal	1861–1896	National hero of the Philippines	Peso/Piso	₱1 and ₱2	Obverse	1916–1921 (Philippine National Bank); 1903–1906 (Philippine Islands Silver Certificate); 1918–1929 (Philippine Islands Treasury Certificate); 1936–1941 (Commonwealth Treasury Certificate); 1944 ("Victory" overprint); 1949–1969 (Central Bank of the Philippines); 1969 ("Pilipino" series); 1970–1978 ("Ang Bagong Lipunan" series)
Ferdinand Magellan	1480–1521	The first circumnavigation of the Earth, from Europe to East, and to West; for the first expedition from Europe to Asia by the West; and for captaining the first expedition across the Atlantic Ocean to the Strait of Magellan and across the Pacific Ocean	Peso	₱2 and ₱100	Reverse (₱2); Obverse (₱100)	1916–1920 (Philippine National Bank); 1916 (Philippine Islands Silver Certificate); 1918–1929 (Philippine Islands Treasury Certificate); 1944 ("Victory" overprint); 1949 (Central Bank of the Philippines)
William McKinley	1843–1901	25th President of the United States (1897–1901)	Peso	₱5	Obverse	1916–1937 (Philippine National Bank); 1903–1916 (Philippine Islands Silver Certificate); 1918–1929 (Philippine Islands Treasury Certificate)
George Dewey	1837–1916	Admiral of the Navy	Peso	₱5	Obverse	1929 (Philippine Islands Treasury Certificate); 1936–1941 (Commonwealth Treasury Certificate); 1944 ("Victory" overprint)
George Washington	1732–1799	1st President of the United States (1789–1797)	Peso	₱10	Obverse	1916–1937 (Philippine National Bank); 1903–1916 (Philippine Islands Silver Certificate); 1918–1929 (Philippine Islands Treasury Certificate); 1936–1941 (Commonwealth Treasury Certificate); 1944 ("Victory" overprint)
Henry W. Lawton	1843–1899	Major-General of the United States Army; served in the American Civil War, the Apache Wars, the Spanish–American War and the Philippine–American War	Peso	₱50	Obverse	1916–1920 (Philippine National Bank); 1916 (Philippine Islands Silver Certificate); 1918–1929 (Philippine Islands Treasury Certificate); 1936 (Commonwealth Treasury Certificate); 1944 ("Victory" overprint)
Miguel López de Legazpi	c. 1502–1572	Governor-General of the Spanish East Indies (1565–1572)	Peso	₱500 and ₱50	Obverse (₱500); Reverse (₱50)	1906 (Philippine Islands Silver Certificate); 1918–1929 (Philippine Islands Treasury Certificate); 1936 (Commonwealth Treasury Certificate); 1944 ("Victory" overprint); 1949 (Central Bank of the Philippines)
William A. Jones	1849–1918	Member of the United States House of Representatives from Virginia's 1st district (1891–1918); Chairman of the Committee on Insular Affairs (1911–1918)	Peso	₱20	Obverse	1916–1937 (Philippine National Bank)
Marcelo Hilario del Pilar y Gatmaitán	1850–1896	Writer, lawyer, journalist, and freemason; leader of the Reform Movement	Peso	₱5	Obverse	1949 (Central Bank of the Philippines)
Graciano López Jaena	1856–1896	Journalist, orator, revolutionary, and national hero	Peso	₱5	Obverse	1949 (Central Bank of the Philippines)
Mariano Goez, José Burgos and Jacinto Zamora (Gomburza)	1799–1872 (Mariano Gomez); 1837–1872 (José Burgos); 1835–1872 (Jacinto Zamora)	Known for the 1872 Cavite Mutiny	Peso	₱10	Obverse	1949 (Central Bank of the Philippines)
Andrés Bonifacio	1863–1897	Revolutionary leader and the president of the Tagalog Republic	Peso/Piso	₱10 and ₱20	Obverse	1949 (Central Bank of the Philippines); 1997–2001 ("New Design/BSP" series)
Emilio Jacinto	1875–1899	General during the Philippine Revolution	Peso	₱20	Obverse	1949 (Central Bank of the Philippines)
Antonio Luna	1866–1899	General in the Philippine–American War	Peso	₱50	Obverse	1949 (Central Bank of the Philippines)
Melchora Aquino	1812–1919	Revolutionary	Peso	₱100	Obverse	1949 (Central Bank of the Philippines)
Manuel L. Quezon	1878–1944	2nd President of the Philippines (1935–1944)	Peso	₱20	obverse	1986–
Sergio Osmeña	1878–1961	4th President of the Philippines (1944–1946)	Peso	₱50	obverse	1986–
Manuel Roxas	1892–1948	5th President of the Philippines (1946–1948)	Peso	₱100	obverse	1986–
Diosdado Macapagal	1910–1997	9th President of the Philippines (1961–1965)	Peso	₱200	obverse	2002–
Hilario Davide, Jr.	1935–	20th Chief Justice of the Supreme Court (1998–2005); swore in President Gloria Macapagal Arroyo	Peso	₱200	reverse	2002–
Gloria Macapagal Arroyo	1947–	Daughter of President Diosdado Macapagal; 14th President of the Philippines (2001–2009)	Peso	₱200	reverse	2002–
Corazon Aquino	1933–2009	11th President of the Philippines (1986–1992)	Peso	₱500	obverse	2010–
Benigno Aquino Jr.	1932–1983	Leader of the opposition to the autocracy and dictatorship of President Ferdinand Marcos	Peso	₱500	both	1987–
José Abad Santos	1886–1942	5th Chief Justice of the Supreme Court; executed by Japanese forces during World War II	Peso	₱1,000	obverse	2002–
Josefa Llanes Escoda	1898–1945	Founder of the Girl Scouts in the Philippines; executed by Japanese forces during World War II	Peso	₱1,000	obverse	1991–
Vicente Lim	1889–1945	Brigadier General of the Philippine Army; executed by Japanese forces during World War II	Peso	₱1,000	obverse	1991–
Lapu-Lapu		Datu of Mactan in the Visayas; the first native Filipino to resist imperial Spanish colonization and for killing Portuguese explorer Ferdinand Magellan in the Battle of Mactan	Peso	₱5,000	obverse	2021– (commemorative)

== Poland ==
(Poland) Currency: Złoty (zł, 1924–present)

Person	Lifespan	Reason for honour	Currency	Denomination	Obverse or reverse	Years of circulation
Józef Bem	1794–1850	general; war hero	Złoty	10 zł	obverse	1982–1995
Bolesław I	966/7-1025	King of Poland (992–1025)	Złoty	2,000 zł	reverse	1977–1995
Frédéric Chopin	1810–1849	romantic composer and pianist	Złoty	5,000 zł	obverse	1982–1995
Nicolaus Copernicus	1473–1543	developed a heliocentric model of the Solar System	Złoty	1,000 zł	obverse	1962–1965
Nicolaus Copernicus	1473–1543	developed a heliocentric model of the Solar System	Złoty	1,000 zł	obverse	1975–1995
Marie Curie	1867–1934	Nobel Prize winner for Physics (1903) and Chemistry (1911)	Złoty	20,000 zł	obverse	1989–1995
Jarosław Dąbrowski	1836–1871	General; commander-in-chief of the Paris Commune	Złoty	200 zł	obverse	1976–1995
Doubravka of Bohemia	940/45-977	Queen Consort of Mieszko I (965–977)	Złoty	2 zł	obverse	1936–1940
Tadeusz Kościuszko	1746–1817	General; leader of the Kościuszko Uprising (1794)	Złoty	500 zł	obverse	1976–1995
Mieszko I	935–992	Ruler of Poland (960–992)	Złoty	2,000 zł	obverse	1977–1995
Stanisław Moniuszko	1819–1872	Conductor and composer	Złoty	100,000 zł	obverse	1990–1995
Ignacy Jan Paderewski	1860–1941	3rd Prime Minister (1919)	Złoty	2,000,000 zł	obverse	1992–1995
Emilia Plater	1806–1831	countess; hero from the November Uprising	Złoty	20 zł	obverse	1936–1939
Emilia Plater	1806–1831	countess; hero from the November Uprising	Złoty	20 zł	obverse	1940–1944
Władysław Reymont	1867–1925	Nobel Prize winner for Literature (1924)	Złoty	1,000,000 zł	obverse	1991–1995
Henryk Sienkiewicz	1846–1916	Nobel Prize winner for Literature (1905)	Złoty	500,000 zł	obverse	1990–1995
Stanisław Staszic	1755–1826	Priest, philosopher and statesman; supporter of the Constitution of May 3, 1791	Złoty	50,000 zł	obverse	1989–1995
Karol Świerczewski	1897–1947	Leader in the post-World War II government of Poland	Złoty	50 zł	obverse	1975–1995
Romuald Traugutt	1826–1864	general; hero from the January Uprising	Złoty	20 zł	obverse	1982–1995
Ludwik Waryński	1856–1889	socialist activist	Złoty	100 zł	obverse	1975–1995
Stanisław Wyspiański	1869–1907	playwright	Złoty	10,000 zł	obverse	1988–1995
Boleslaw I	966/7-1025	King of Poland (992–1025)	Zloty	zl 20	obverse	1995–, 2012–, 2015– and 2017–
Casimir III	1310–1370	King of Poland (1333–1370)	Zloty	zl 50	obverse	1995–, 2012–, 2015– and 2017–
Jogaila	1351–1434	King of Poland (1386–1434)	Zloty	zl 100	obverse	1995–, 2012–, 2015– and 2017–
Mieszko I	935–992	Duke of Poland (960–992)	Zloty	zl 10	obverse	1995–, 2012–, 2015– and 2017–
Sigismund I the Old	1520–1572	King of Poland (1530–1572)	Zloty	zl 200	obverse	1995–, 2012–, 2015– and 2017–
John III Sobieski	1629–1696	King of Poland and Grand Duke of Lithuiania (1674–1696)	Zloty	zl 500	obverse	
Józef Klemens Piłsudski	1867–1935	Chief of State of the Second Republic of Poland (1918–1922); First Marshal of Poland (1920); Dictator of the Second Polish Republic (1926–1935); Minister of Military Affairs (1926–1935)	Zloty	zl 10 and zl 20	Obverse	2008– (commemorative); 2014– (commemorative)
Juliusz Słowacki	1809–1849	Romantic Poet	Zloty	zl 20	Obverse	2009– (commemorative)
Frédéric Chopin	1810–1849	Composer and Virtuoso pianist	Zloty	zl 20	Obverse	2010– (commemorative)
Marie Curie	1867–1934	Physicist and chemist; winner of the Nobel Prize in Physics (1903) and Chemistry (1911)	Zloty	zl 20	Obverse	2011– (commemorative)
Jan Długosz	1415–1480	Priest, chronicler, diplomat, soldier, and secretary to Bishop Zbigniew Oleśnicki of Kraków	Zloty	zl 20	Obverse	2015– (commemorative)
Doubravka of Bohemia	ca. 940/45-977	Bohemian princess of the Přemyslid dynasty and by marriage Duchess of the Polans	Zloty	zl 20	Obverse	2016– (commemorative)
Lech Kaczyński	1949–2010	President of Poland (2005–2010)	Zloty	zl 20	Obverse	2021– (commemorative)
Pope John Paul II and Stefan Wyszyński	1920–2005 (John Paul II); 1901–1981 (Stefan Wyszyński)	Pope of the Roman Catholic Church (1978–2005); Saint of the Roman Catholic Church (John Paul II); Cardinal, Archbishop of Gniezno and Warsaw (1948–1981) (Stefan Wyszyński)	Zloty	zl 50	Both (John Paul II); Reverse (Stefan Wyszyński)	2006– (commemorative)

== Portugal ==
(Portugal) Currencies: Escudo ($, 1911–2002)
Euro (€, 2002–present)

Person	Lifespan	Reason for honour	Currency	Denomination	Obverse or reverse	Years of circulation
Pedro Álvares Cabral	1467–1520	Explorer and navigator; discovered the sea route to Brazil in 1500	Escudo	1,00000	obverse	1996–2002
Vasco da Gama	1469–1524	Explorer and navigator; sailed from Europe to India (1497–1498)	Escudo	5,00000	obverse	1996–2002
João de Barros	1496–1570	Historian	Escudo	50000	obverse	1997–2002
Bartolomeu Dias	1450–1500	Explorer and navigator; sailed around the Cape of Good Hope in 1488	Escudo	2,00000	obverse	1996–2002
Henry the Navigator	1394–1460	Patron of Portuguese exploration	Escudo	10,00000	obverse	1996–2002

== Portuguese India ==
(Portuguese India) Currency: Portuguese Indian rupia (1871–1958); Portuguese Indian escudo (1958–1961)

Person	Lifespan	Reason for honour	Currency	Denomination	Obverse or reverse	Years of circulation
Afonso de Albuquerque	1453–1615	Governor and Captain-General of the Seas of India, Viceroy of India, First Duke of Goa	Rupia	All (5-500 rupia)	Obverse	1945
Afonso de Albuquerque	1453–1615	Governor and Captain-General of the Seas of India, Viceroy of India, First Duke of Goa	Escudo	All (30-1,000 escudos)	Both	1959–1961

== Portuguese Timor ==
(Portuguese Timor) Currency: Portuguese Timorese escudo (1959–1976)

Person	Lifespan	Reason for honour	Currency	Denomination	Obverse or reverse	Years of circulation
Jose Celestino da Silva			Escudo	All (30–500 escudos)	Obverse	1959
Régulo D. Aleixo			Escudo	All (20-1,000 escudos)	Obverse	1963–1968

== Republika Srpska ==
(Republika Srpska) Currency: Dinar (plural: dinara (1992–1998))

Person	Lifespan	Reason for honour	Currency	Denomination	Obverse or reverse	Years of circulation
Petar Kočić	1877–1916	Writer and poet	Dinar	All (5,000–50,000,000,000 din.)	Obverse	1993

== Romania ==
(Romania) Currency: Leu (pl. lei: 1867–Present)

Person	Lifespan	Reason for honour	Currency	Denomination	Obverse or reverse	Years of circulation
Grigore Antipa	1867–1944	Biologist; studied fauna and wildlife of the Danube Delta and the Black Sea	Leu	200 Lei	obverse	1992–1996
Nicolae Bălcescu	1819–1852	Leader of the Wallachian Revolution of 1848	Leu	100 Lei	obverse	1952–1966
Nicolae Bălcescu	1819–1852	Leader of the Wallachian Revolution of 1848	Leu	100 Lei	obverse	1966–1991
Lucian Blaga	1895–1961	Poet, playwright and philosopher	Leu	5,000 Lei	obverse	1998–2002
Constantin Brâncuși	1876–1957	Sculptor	Leu	500 Lei	both	1991–1992
Constantin Brâncuși	1876–1957	Sculptor	Leu	500 Lei	obverse	1992–1999
Ion Luca Caragiale	1852–1912	Playwright and short story writer	Leu	1,000,000 Lei	obverse	2003–2007
Carol II	1893–1953	King (1930–1940)	Leu	500 Lei	obverse	1930–1940
Carol II	1893–1953	King (1930–1940)	Leu	1,000 Lei	reverse	1931–1936
Alexandru Ioan Cuza	1820–1873	Prince of Moldavia and Wallachia (1859–1862); Domnitor of Romania (1862–1866)	Leu	50 Lei	obverse	1952–1966
Alexandru Ioan Cuza	1820–1873	Prince of Moldavia and Wallachia (1859–1862); Domnitor of Romania (1862–1866)	Leu	50 Lei	obverse	1966–1991
Decebal	??-106	last King of Dacia	Leu	5,000 Lei	obverse	1943–1947
Decebal	??-106	last King of Dacia	Leu	100,000 Lei	obverse	1947
Decebal	??-106	last King of Dacia	Leu	1,000,000 Lei	obverse	1947
Mihai Eminescu	1850–1889	Romantic poet	Leu	1,000 Lei	obverse	1991–1993
Mihai Eminescu	1850–1889	Romantic poet	Leu	1,000 Lei	obverse	1993–1998
Mihai Eminescu	1850–1889	Romantic poet	Leu	1,000 Lei	obverse	1998–2001
George Enescu	1881–1955	Composer, violinist and pianist	Leu	50,000 Lei	obverse	1996–2002
George Enescu	1881–1955	Composer, violinist and pianist	Leu	50,000 Lei	obverse	2000–2004
George Enescu	1881–1955	Composer, violinist and pianist	Leu	50,000 Lei	obverse	2001–2007
Ferdinand I	1865–1927	King (1914–1927)	Ban (1/100 Leu)	10 Bani	obverse	1917–1918
Ferdinand I	1865–1927	King (1914–1927)	Ban (1/100 Leu)	25 Bani	obverse	1917–1918
Ferdinand I	1865–1927	King (1914–1927)	Ban (1/100 Leu)	50 Bani	obverse	1917–1918
Nicolae Grigorescu	1838–1907	Painter; founder of modern Romanian painting	Leu	100,000 Lei	obverse	1998–2004
Nicolae Grigorescu	1838–1907	Painter; founder of modern Romanian painting	Leu	100,000 Lei	obverse	2001–2007
Avram Iancu	1824–1872	Leader in the Austrian Empire Revolutions of 1848–1849	Leu	5,000 Lei	obverse	1992–1993
Avram Iancu	1824–1872	Leader in the Austrian Empire Revolutions of 1848–1849	Leu	5,000 Lei	obverse	1993–1998
Nicolae Iorga	1871–1940	Prime Minister of Romania (1931–1932)	Leu	10,000 Lei	obverse	1994–1999
Nicolae Iorga	1871–1940	Prime Minister of Romania (1931–1932)	Leu	10,000 Lei	obverse	1999–2002
Nicolae Iorga	1871–1940	Prime Minister of Romania (1931–1932)	Leu	10,000 Lei	obverse	2000–2007
Trajan	53–117	Roman Emperor; conqueror of Dacia	Leu	5,000 Lei	obverse	1943–1947
Trajan	53–117	Roman Emperor; conqueror of Dacia	Leu	100,000 Lei	obverse	1947
Trajan	53–117	Roman Emperor; conqueror of Dacia	Leu	1,000,000 Lei	obverse	1947
Tudor Vladimirescu	1780–1821	Revolutionary leader; led the Wallachian Uprising of 1821 and the Pandur militia	Leu	1,000 Lei	obverse	1947
Tudor Vladimirescu	1780–1821	Revolutionary leader; led the Wallachian Uprising of 1821 and the Pandur militia	Leu	1,000 Lei	obverse	1948–1951
Tudor Vladimirescu	1780–1821	Revolutionary leader; led the Wallachian Uprising of 1821 and the Pandur militia	Leu	25 Lei	obverse	1952–1966
Tudor Vladimirescu	1780–1821	Revolutionary leader; led the Wallachian Uprising of 1821 and the Pandur militia	Leu	25 Lei	obverse	1966–1991
Aurel Vlaicu	1882–1913	Engineer, inventor and early pilot	Leu	500,000 Lei	obverse	2000–2007
Lucian Blaga	1895–1961	Poet, playwright and philosopher	Leu	200 L	obverse	2006–
Ion I. C. Brătianu	1864–1927	Prime minister of Romania (five times, 1909–1927)	Leu	100 L	obverse	2019– (commemorative)
Ion Luca Caragiale	1852–1912	Playwright and short story writer	Leu	100 L	obverse	2005–
Mihai Eminescu	1850–1889	Romantic poet	Leu	500 L	obverse	2005–
George Enescu	1881–1955	Composer, violinist and pianist	Leu	5 L	obverse	2005–
Ferdinand I	1865–1927	King of Romania (1914–1927)	Leu	100 L	obverse	2018– (commemorative)
Nicolae Grigorescu	1838–1907	Painter; a founder of modern Romanian painting	Leu	10 L	obverse	2005–
Nicolae Grigorescu	1838–1907	Painter; a founder of modern Romanian painting	Leu	10 L	obverse	2008–
Nicolae Iorga	1871–1940	Prime Minister of Romania (1931–1932) and historian	Leu	1 L	obverse	2005–
Queen Marie	1875–1938	Queen consort of Romania (1914–1927)	Leu	100 L	obverse	2018– (commemorative)
Ecaterina Teodoroiu	1894–1917	World War I Second Lieutenant	Leu	20 L	obverse	2021–
Aurel Vlaicu	1882–1913	Engineer, inventor and early pilot	Leu	50 L	obverse	2005–

== Russia ==
(Russia) Currency: Ruble (since 1710)
Symbol: руб/₽

Person	Lifespan	Reason for honor	Denomination	Obverse or reverse	Years of circulation
Nikolay Muravyov-Amursky	1809–1881	Governor General of Irkutsk and Yeniseysk (1847–1861)	5,000 ₽	obverse	2006–
Peter I	1672–1725	Tsar of Russia and first Russian Emperor (1682–1725)	500 ₽	obverse	1995–
Yaroslav I	978–1054	Prince of Kiev and Novgorod (1019–1054)	1,000 ₽	obverse	2001–
Lev Ivanovich Yashin	1929–1990	Goalkeeper for Dynamo Moscow (1950–1970) and the Soviet Union national football team (1954–1967)	100 ₽	obverse	2018– (commemorative)

== Samoa ==
(Samoa) Currency: Tālā (since 1967)
Symbol: WS$

Person	Lifespan	Reason for honor	Denomination	Obverse or reverse	Years of circulation
Malietoa Tanumafili II	1913–2007	O le Ao o le Malo (Head of State) of Samoa (1962–2007)	100 tālā	Obverse	2008–

== Sarawak, Raj of ==
(Raj of Sarawak) Currency: Dollar ($; 1858–1953)

Person	Lifespan	Reason for honor	Currency	Denomination	Obverse or reverse	Years of circulation
Charles Vyner Brooke	1874–1963	3rd and last White Rajah of Sarawak (1917–1946)	Cent	10 cents	Obverse	1940 (emergency issue)
Charles Vyner Brooke	1874–1963	3rd and last White Rajah of Sarawak (1917–1946)	Dollar	All (1–50 dollars)	Obverse	1919–1940

== Saudi Arabia ==
(Saudi Arabia) Currency: Riyal (since 1953)
Symbol: ر.س

Person	Lifespan	Reason for honor	Denomination	Obverse or reverse	Years of circulation
Abdullah bin Abdulaziz Al Saud	1924–2015	King of Saudi Arabia and Custodian of the Two Holy Mosques (2005–2015)	1–100 riyals	Obverse	2007–
Abdulaziz ibn Abdul Rahman ibn Faisal ibn Turki ibn Abdullah ibn Muhammad Al Saud	1876–1953	King of Nejd and Hejaz (1926–1932); King of Saudi Arabia (1932–1953); Founder of Saudi Arabia	500 riyals	Obverse	2007–
Salman bin Abdulaziz Al Saud	1935–	King of Saudi Arabia and the Custodian of the Two Holy Mosques (2015–)	5–100 riyals	Obverse	2016–

== Serbia ==
(Serbia) Currency: Dinar (since 2003)
Symbol: din.

Person	Lifespan	Reason for honor	Denomination	Obverse or reverse	Years of circulation
Jovan Cvijić	1865–1927	geographer	500 din.	both	2004–
Slobodan Jovanović	1869–1958	Prime Minister of the Yugoslav government-in-exile (1942–1943)	5,000 din.	both	2003–
Vuk Stefanović Karadžić	1787–1864	Linguist; reformer of the Serbian language	10 din.	both	2006–
Stevan Stojanović Mokranjac	1856–1914	Composer and music educator	50 din.	both	2005–
Milutin Milanković	1879–1958	Mathematician, astronomer and geophysicist	2,000 din.	both	2011–
Petar II Petrović-Njegoš	1813–1851	Prince-Bishop of Montenegro (1830–1851); Serbian language poet	20 din.	both	2006–
Nadežda Petrović	1873–1915	Painter	200 din.	both	2006–
Nikola Tesla	1856–1943	Serbian-American electrical engineer and inventor	100 din.	both	2006–
Đorđe Vajfert	1850–1937	1st president of the National Bank of Serbia (1912–1926)	1,000 din.	both	2006–

== Serbia and Montenegro ==
See: #FR Yugoslavia

== Sierra Leone ==
(Sierra Leone) Currency: Leone (since 1964)
Symbol: Le

Person	Lifespan	Reason for honor	Denomination	Obverse or reverse	Years of circulation
Bai Bureh	1840–1908	Leader in the Hut Tax War of 1898 in Northern Sierra Leone against British rule and Krio dominance	1,000 Leones	Obverse	2002–
Isaac Theophilus Akunna Wallace-Johnson	1894–1965	Trade unionist, journalist, activist, and politician	2,000 Leones	Obverse	2000–
Sengbe Pieh (Joseph Cinqué)	1814–1879	Responsible for leading the revolt of fellow slaves on the Spanish slave ship, Amistad	5,000 Leones	Obverse	2002–

Person	Lifespan	Reason for honor	Denomination	Obverse or reverse	Years of circulation
Bai Bureh	1840–1908	Leader in the Hut Tax War of 1898 in Northern Sierra Leone against British rule and Krio dominance	1 Leone	Obverse	2022–
Isaac Theophilus Akunna Wallace-Johnson	1894–1965	Trade unionist, journalist, activist, and politician	2 Leones	Obverse	2022–
Sengbe Pieh (Joseph Cinqué)	1814–1879	Responsible for leading the revolt of fellow slaves on the Spanish slave ship, Amistad	5 Leones	Obverse	2022–
Constance Cummings-John	1918–2000	Educationalist and politician; served as the first female mayor of Freetown in 1966	20 Leones	Obverse	2022–

== Singapore ==
(Singapore) Currency: Dollar (since 1967)
Symbol: S$

Person	Years of Birth–Death	Reason for honor	Denomination	Obverse or reverse	In Circulation since
Yusof bin Ishak	1910–1970	First President of Singapore (1965–1970)	S$2	obverse	1999
Yusof bin Ishak	1910–1970	First President of Singapore (1965–1970)	S$5	obverse	1999
Yusof bin Ishak	1910–1970	First President of Singapore (1965–1970)	S$10	obverse	1999
Yusof bin Ishak	1910–1970	First President of Singapore (1965–1970)	S$20	obverse	1999
Yusof bin Ishak	1910–1970	First President of Singapore (1965–1970)	S$50	obverse	1999
Yusof bin Ishak	1910–1970	First President of Singapore (1965–1970)	S$100	obverse	1999
Yusof bin Ishak	1910–1970	First President of Singapore (1965–1970)	S$1000	obverse	1999
Yusof bin Ishak	1910–1970	First President of Singapore (1965–1970)	S$10,000	obverse	1999

Person	Lifespan	Reason for honor	Denomination	Obverse or reverse	Years of circulation
Lee Kuan Yew	1923–2015	1st Prime Minister of Singapore (1959–1990)	S$50	Both	2015– (commemorative)
Munshi Abdullah	1796–1864	Author, translator and teacher	S$20	Reverse	2019– (commemorative)
Henry Nicholas Ridley	1855–1956	Promoting rubber in the Malay Peninsula	S$20	Reverse	2019– (commemorative)
Tan Kah Kee	1874–1961	Businessman; Philanthropic work, for setting up schools in China and Southeast Asia and for helping to raise funds to support China in events of the 20th century	S$20	Reverse	2019– (commemorative)
P. Govindasamy Pillai	1887–1980	Businessman and philanthropist	S$20	Reverse	2019– (commemorative)
Teresa Hsu Chih	1898–2011	Charity worker, yoga teacher and nurse	S$20	Reverse	2019– (commemorative)
Alice Pennefather	1903–1983	Badminton and tennis champion	S$20	Reverse	2019– (commemorative)
Adnan Saidi	1915–1942	Malayan military officer of the 1st Malaya Infantry Brigade who fought the Japanese in the Battle of Pasir Panjang in Singapore during World War II	S$20	Reverse	2019– (commemorative)
Ruth Wong Hie King	1918–1982	Educator	S$20	Reverse	2019– (commemorative)

== Slovenia ==
(Slovenia) Currencies: Tolar (SIT, 1991–2007)
Euro (€, 2007–present)

Person	Lifespan	Reason for honour	Currency	Denomination	Obverse or reverse	Years of circulation
Ivan Cankar	1876–1918	writer, playwright, poet	Tolar	10,000 SIT	obverse	1995–2007
Jacobus Gallus	1550–1591	Renaissance composer	Tolar	200 SIT	obverse	1993–2007
Rihard Jakopič	1869–1943	impressionist painter	Tolar	100 SIT	obverse	1992–2007
Ivana Kobilca	1861–1926	realist painter	Tolar	5,000 SIT	obverse	1993–2007
Jože Plečnik	1872–1957	architect	Tolar	500 SIT	obverse	1992–2007
France Prešeren	1800–1849	poet	Tolar	1,000 SIT	obverse	1992–2007
Primož Trubar	1508–1586	founder and superintendent of the Protestant Church of Slovenia	Tolar	10 SIT	obverse	1992–2007
Johann Weikhard von Valvasor	1641–1693	scholar	Tolar	20 SIT	obverse	1992–2007
Jurij Vega	1754–1802	mathematician and physicist	Tolar	50 SIT	obverse	1993–2007

== South Africa ==
(South Africa) Currencies: Pound (£SA, 1825–1961)
Rand (R, 1961–present)

Person	Lifespan	Reason for honour	Currency	Denomination	Obverse or reverse	Years of circulation
Jan van Riebeeck	1619–1677	Dutch founder and colonial administrator of Cape Town (1652–1662)	Pound	10/–	obverse	1948–1961
Jan van Riebeeck	1619–1677	Dutch founder and colonial administrator of Cape Town (1652–1662)	Pound	£1	obverse	1948–1961
Jan van Riebeeck	1619–1677	Dutch founder and colonial administrator of Cape Town (1652–1662)	Pound	£5	obverse	1948–1961
Jan van Riebeeck	1619–1677	Dutch founder and colonial administrator of Cape Town (1652–1662)	Pound	£10	obverse	1952–1961
Jan van Riebeeck	1619–1677	Dutch founder and colonial administrator of Cape Town (1652–1662)	Pound	£100	obverse	1952–1961
Jan van Riebeeck	1619–1677	Dutch founder and colonial administrator of Cape Town (1652–1662)	Rand	R 1	obverse	1961–1966
Jan van Riebeeck	1619–1677	Dutch founder and colonial administrator of Cape Town (1652–1662)	Rand	R 1	obverse	1966–1973
Jan van Riebeeck	1619–1677	Dutch founder and colonial administrator of Cape Town (1652–1662)	Rand	R 1	obverse	1973–1975
Jan van Riebeeck	1619–1677	Dutch founder and colonial administrator of Cape Town (1652–1662)	Rand	R 1	obverse	1975–1977
Jan van Riebeeck	1619–1677	Dutch founder and colonial administrator of Cape Town (1652–1662)	Rand	R 2	obverse	1961–1974
Jan van Riebeeck	1619–1677	Dutch founder and colonial administrator of Cape Town (1652–1662)	Rand	R 2	obverse	1974–1975
Jan van Riebeeck	1619–1677	Dutch founder and colonial administrator of Cape Town (1652–1662)	Rand	R 2	obverse	1975–1978
Jan van Riebeeck	1619–1677	Dutch founder and colonial administrator of Cape Town (1652–1662)	Rand	R 2	obverse	1978–1993
Jan van Riebeeck	1619–1677	Dutch founder and colonial administrator of Cape Town (1652–1662)	Rand	R 5	obverse	1966–1975
Jan van Riebeeck	1619–1677	Dutch founder and colonial administrator of Cape Town (1652–1662)	Rand	R 5	obverse	1975–1978
Jan van Riebeeck	1619–1677	Dutch founder and colonial administrator of Cape Town (1652–1662)	Rand	R 5	obverse	1978–1993
Jan van Riebeeck	1619–1677	Dutch founder and colonial administrator of Cape Town (1652–1662)	Rand	R 10	obverse	1961–1966
Jan van Riebeeck	1619–1677	Dutch founder and colonial administrator of Cape Town (1652–1662)	Rand	R 10	obverse	1966–1975
Jan van Riebeeck	1619–1677	Dutch founder and colonial administrator of Cape Town (1652–1662)	Rand	R 10	obverse	1975–1978
Jan van Riebeeck	1619–1677	Dutch founder and colonial administrator of Cape Town (1652–1662)	Rand	R 10	obverse	1978–1993
Jan van Riebeeck	1619–1677	Dutch founder and colonial administrator of Cape Town (1652–1662)	Rand	R 20	obverse	1961–1979
Jan van Riebeeck	1619–1677	Dutch founder and colonial administrator of Cape Town (1652–1662)	Rand	R 20	obverse	1979–1993
Jan van Riebeeck	1619–1677	Dutch founder and colonial administrator of Cape Town (1652–1662)	Rand	R 50	obverse	1984–1992
Nelson Rolihlahla Mandela	1918–2013	President of South Africa (1994–1999)	Rand	10 rand	Obverse (2012 issue); Reverse (2018 commemorative issue)	2012– (original issue); 2018– (commemorative issue)
Nelson Rolihlahla Mandela	1918–2013	President of South Africa (1994–1999)	Rand	20 rand	Obverse (2012 issue); Reverse (2018 commemorative issue)	2012– (original issue); 2018– (commemorative issue)
Nelson Rolihlahla Mandela	1918–2013	President of South Africa (1994–1999)	Rand	50 rand	Obverse (2012 issue); Reverse (2018 commemorative issue)	2012– (original issue); 2018– (commemorative issue)
Nelson Rolihlahla Mandela	1918–2013	President of South Africa (1994–1999)	Rand	100 rand	Obverse (2012 issue); Reverse (2018 commemorative issue)	2012– (original issue); 2018– (commemorative issue)
Nelson Rolihlahla Mandela	1918–2013	President of South Africa (1994–1999)	Rand	200 rand	Obverse (2012 issue); Reverse (2018 commemorative issue)	2012– (original issue); 2018– (commemorative issue)

== South Korea ==
(South Korea) Currency: First South Korean won (1945–1953); Hwan (전; 1953–1962)

Person	Lifespan	Reason for honour	Currency	Denomination	Obverse or reverse	Years of circulation
I Seungman	1875–1975	1st President of South Korea (1948–1960)	First South Korean won	Both (500 and 1,000 won)	Obverse	1952–1953 (500 won); 1950–1953 (1,000 won)
I Seungman	1875–1975	1st President of South Korea (1948–1960)	Hwan	All (100-1,000 hwan)	Obverse	1953–1962 (100 hwan); 1956–1962 (500 hwan); 1957–1962 (1,000 hwan)
King Sejong the Great	1397–1450	4th King of the Kingdom of Joseon (1418–1450)	Hwan	Both (500 and 1,000 hwan)	Obverse	1961–1962 (500 hwan); 1960–1962 (1,000 hwan)
Yi Hwang	1501–1570	Confucian scholar	Won	₩1,000	obverse	1983–
Yi I	1536–1584	Confucian scholar	Won	₩5,000	obverse	1983–
King Sejong the Great	1397–1450	4th King of the Kingdom of Joseon (1418–1450)	Won	₩10,000	obverse	1983–
Shin Saimdang	1504–1551	Artist, calligraphist, poet and writer	Won	₩50,000	obverse	2009–

== South Sudan ==
(South Sudan) Currency: Pound (since 2011) and Piaster (since 2011)
Symbol: £

Person	Years of Birth–Death	Reason for honor	Denomination	Obverse or reverse	In Circulation since
John Garang de Mabior	1945–2005	President of the Southern Sudan Autonomous Region (July 9–30, 2005); Leader of the Sudan People's Liberation Army during the Second Sudanese Civil War	All (5 to 25 South Sudanese piasters)	Obverse	2011
John Garang de Mabior	1945–2005	President of the Southern Sudan Autonomous Region (July 9–30, 2005); Leader of the Sudan People's Liberation Army during the Second Sudanese Civil War	All (1 to 1,000 South Sudanese pounds)	Obverse	2011 (1 to 100 South Sudanese pounds); 2016 (20 South Sudanese pounds); 2018 (500 South Sudanese pounds); 2021 (1,000 South Sudanese pounds)

== South Vietnam ==
(South Vietnam) Currency: South Vietnamese đồng ($; 1953–1978)

Person	Lifespan	Reason for honour	Currency	Denomination	Obverse or reverse	Years of circulation
Lê Văn Duyệt	1763 or 1764–1832	General	South Vietnamese đồng	$100	Obverse	1966
Nguyễn Huệ (Quang Trung)	1753–1792	Second emperor of the Tây Sơn dynasty (1788–1792)	South Vietnamese đồng	$200	Both	1966
Trān-Hu'ng-Šao			South Vietnamese đồng	$500	Obverse	1966
Trương Công Định	1820–1864	Leading a guerrilla army in southern Vietnam against the French invasion in defiance of emperor Tự Đức	South Vietnamese đồng	$1,000	Obverse	1972 (not issued)

== Soviet Union ==
(Soviet Union) Currency: Rouble (руб (Cyrillic) Rbl (singular) and Rbls (pl), 1917–1991) and Chervonets (1922–1947)

Person	Lifespan	Reason for honour	Currency	Denomination	Obverse or reverse	Years of circulation
Vladimir Lenin	1870–1924	Leader of the October Revolution; 1st Chairman of the Council of People's Commissars (1917–1924)	Rouble	10 Rbls	obverse	1947–1961
Vladimir Lenin	1870–1924	Leader of the October Revolution; 1st Chairman of the Council of People's Commissars (1917–1924)	Rouble	10 Rbls	obverse	1961–1991
Vladimir Lenin	1870–1924	Leader of the October Revolution; 1st Chairman of the Council of People's Commissars (1917–1924)	Rouble	25 Rbls	obverse	1947–1961
Vladimir Lenin	1870–1924	Leader of the October Revolution; 1st Chairman of the Council of People's Commissars (1917–1924)	Rouble	25 Rbls	obverse	1961–1992
Vladimir Lenin	1870–1924	Leader of the October Revolution; 1st Chairman of the Council of People's Commissars (1917–1924)	Rouble	50 Rbls	obverse	1961–1992
Vladimir Lenin	1870–1924	Leader of the October Revolution; 1st Chairman of the Council of People's Commissars (1917–1924)	Rouble	100 Rbls	obverse	1961–1992
Vladimir Lenin	1870–1924	Leader of the October Revolution; 1st Chairman of the Council of People's Commissars (1917–1924)	Chervonets	5 chervonzev	obverse	1937–1947
Vladimir Lenin	1870–1924	Leader of the October Revolution; 1st Chairman of the Council of People's Commissars (1917–1924)	Chervonets	10 chervonzev	obverse	1937–1947

== Spain ==
(Spain) Currencies: Peseta (Pta (singular) and Pts (pl), 1868–2002)
Euro (€, 2002–present)

Person	Lifespan	Reason for honour	Currency	Denomination	Obverse or reverse	Years of circulation
Leopoldo Alas y Ureña	1851–1901	Novelist	Peseta	200 Pts	obverse	1982–2002
Christopher Columbus	1451–1506	Navigator and explorer; began European colonization of the Americas (1492)	Peseta	5,000 Pts	obverse	1992–2002
Hernando Cortés	1485–1547	Conquistador of Mexico	Peseta	1,000 Pts	obverse	1992–2002
Rosalía de Castro	1837–1885	Writer and poet	Peseta	500 Pts	obverse	1982–2002
Antonio de Ulloa	1716–1795	Explorer and colonial administrator; served as the first Spanish governor of Louisiana (1766–1768)	Peseta	10,000 Pts	reverse	1987–2002
Felipe VI (Prince of Asturias and King of Spain)	1968–	Prince of Asturias (1977–2014); King of Spain (2014–)	Peseta	10,000 Pts	reverse	1982–1987
Juan Ramón Jiménez	1881–1958	Poet; Nobel Prize winner (1956)	Peseta	2,000 Pts	obverse	1982–1987
Juan Carlos I	1938–	King of Spain (1975–2014)	Peseta	5,000 Pts	obverse	1982–1987
Juan Carlos I	1938–	King of Spain (1975–2014)	Peseta	10,000 Pts	obverse	1982–1987
Juan Carlos I	1938–	King of Spain (1975–2014)	Peseta	10,000 Pts	obverse	1987–2002
José Celestino Mutis	1732–1808	Botanist and mathematician	Peseta	2,000 Pts	obverse	1987–2002
Benito Pérez Galdós	1843–1920	Novelist	Peseta	1,000 Pts	obverse	1982–1987
Francisco Pizarro	1475–1541	Conquistador of Peru	Peseta	1,000 Pts	reverse	1992–2002

== Sri Lanka ==
(Sri Lanka) Currency: Rupee (since 1872)
Symbol: (රු, Rs, ரூ)

Person	Lifespan	Reason for honor	Denomination	Obverse or reverse	Years of circulation
Percy Mahendra "Mahinda" Rajapaksa	1945	6th President of Sri Lanka (2005–2015)	1,000 rupees	Obverse	2009– (commemorative)

== Straits Settlements ==
(Straits Settlements) Currency: Dollar ($; 1898–1939)

Person	Lifespan	Reason for honor	Currency	Denomination	Obverse or reverse	Years of circulation
George V	1865–1936	King of the United Kingdom and the British Dominions, and Emperor of India (1910–1936)	Dollar	$1, $5, $10, $50, $100 and $1,000	Obverse	1916–1935

== Sudan ==
(Sudan) Currency: Sudanese pound (LS, 1957 – June 8, 1992)

Person	Lifespan	Reason for honour	Currency	Denomination	Obverse or reverse	Years of circulation
Gaafar Muhammad an-Nimeiry	1930–2009	4th President of Sudan (1969–1985)	Sudanese pound	All (25 PT-LS.50)	Obverse	1981–1984

== Suriname ==
(Suriname) Currency: Guilder (Gulden (ƒ); 1940–2003)

Person	Lifespan	Reason for honour	Currency	Denomination	Obverse or reverse	Years of circulation
Anton de Kom	1898–1945	Resistance fighter and anti-colonialist author	Guilder	All (ƒ5-ƒ500)	Both	1986–1988
Anthony Nesty	1967–	Olympic swimmer who won a gold medal in the 100 meter butterfly event in the 1988 Summer Olympics	Guilder	ƒ25	Reverse	1991–1998

== Sweden ==
(Sweden) Currency: Krona (kr, 1873–Present)

Person	Lifespan	Reason for honour	Currency	Denomination	Obverse or reverse	Years of circulation
Charles XI	1655–1697	King of Sweden (1660–1697)	Krona	500 kr	obverse	1985–1999
Charles XI	1655–1697	King of Sweden (1660–1697)	Krona	500 kr	obverse	1989–2006
Charles XIV John	1763–1844	King of Sweden and Norway (1818–1844)	Krona	1,000 kr	obverse	1976–1998
Gustav I	1496–1560	King of Sweden (1523–1560)	Krona	5 kr	reverse	1890–1987
Gustav I	1496–1560	King of Sweden (1523–1560)	Krona	5 kr	obverse	1965–1998
Gustav I	1496–1560	King of Sweden (1523–1560)	Krona	10 kr	reverse	1892–1987
Gustav I	1496–1560	King of Sweden (1523–1560)	Krona	10 kr	obverse	1940–1987
Gustav I	1496–1560	King of Sweden (1523–1560)	Krona	50 kr	reverse	1907–1962
Gustav I	1496–1560	King of Sweden (1523–1560)	Krona	100 kr	reverse	1907–1963
Gustav I	1496–1560	King of Sweden (1523–1560)	Krona	1,000 kr	reverse	1907–1950
Gustav III	1746–1792	King of Sweden (1771–1792)	Krona	50 kr	obverse	1965–1990
Gustav V	1858–1950	King of Sweden (1907–1950)	Krona	5 kr	obverse	1948–1987
Gustav V	1858–1950	King of Sweden (1907–1950)	Krona	1,000 kr	reverse	1952–1987
Gustav II Adolf	1594–1632	King of Sweden (1611–1632)	Krona	100 kr	obverse	1965–1985
Gustav II Adolf	1594–1632	King of Sweden (1611–1632)	Krona	100 kr	obverse	1986–2006
Gustaf VI Adolf	1882–1973	King of Sweden (1950–1973)	Krona	5 kr	obverse	1954–1987
Gustaf VI Adolf	1882–1973	King of Sweden (1950–1973)	Krona	10 kr	obverse	1963–1998
Gustaf VI Adolf	1882–1973	King of Sweden (1950–1973)	Krona	10,000 kr	obverse	1958–1991
Selma Lagerlöf	1858–1940	Nobel Prize winner in Literature (1909)	Krona	20 kr	obverse	1992–2006
Carl Linnaeus	1707–1778	Botanist, physician and zoologist; father of taxonomy	Krona	50 kr	reverse	1965–1990
Person		Reason for honor	Krona	Denomination	Obverse or reverse	In Circulation since
Astrid Lindgren		Writer	Krona	20 kr	obverse	2015–
Evert Taube		Artist, author, composer and singer	Krona	50 kr	obverse	2015–
Greta Garbo		Actress	Krona	100 kr	obverse	2016–
Ingmar Bergman		Film director, producer and screenwriter	Krona	200 kr	obverse	2015–
Birgit Nilsson		Soprano	Krona	500 kr	obverse	2016–
Dag Hammarskjöld		Secretary-General of the United Nations (1953–1961)	Krona	1,000 kr	obverse	2015–

== Switzerland ==
(Switzerland) Currency: Franc (Fr., 1850–Present)

Person	Lifespan	Reason for honour	Currency	Denomination	Obverse or reverse	Years of circulation
Francesco Borromini	1599–1667	Baroque architect	Franc	100 Fr.	obverse	1976–2000
Horace Bénédict de Saussure	1740–1799	aristocrat, physicist; considered the founder of mountaineering	Franc	20 Fr.	obverse	1979–2000
Leonhard Euler	1707–1783	mathematician, physicist	Franc	10 Fr.	obverse	1979–2000
Auguste-Henri Forel	1848–1931	psychiatrist and neuroanatomist; studied brain structures of humans and ants	Franc	1,000 Fr.	obverse	1978–2000
Conrad Gessner	1516–1565	authored Historiae animalium (1551–1558), considered the foundation of modern zoology	Franc	50 Fr.	obverse	1978–2000
Gottfried Keller	1819–1890	writer	Franc	10 Fr.	obverse	1956–2000
Saint Martin	316/7-397	patron saint of soldiers	Franc	100 Fr.	obverse	1957–2000
Johann Heinrich Pestalozzi	1746–1827	teacher and education reformer	Franc	20 Fr.	obverse	1930–1976
Albrecht von Haller	1708–1777	anatomist and physiologist	Franc	500 Fr.	obverse	1977–2000
Jacob Burckhardt	1818–1897	historian of the arts	Franc	1,000 Fr.	obverse	1998–
Le Corbusier	1887–1965	modernist architect	Franc	10 Fr.	obverse	1997–
Alberto Giacometti	1901–1966	sculptor, painter, draftsman	Franc	100 Fr.	obverse	1998–
Arthur Honegger	1892–1955	composer	Franc	20 Fr.	obverse	1996–
Charles Ferdinand Ramuz	1878–1947	French-speaking Swiss author	Franc	200 Fr.	obverse	1997–
Sophie Taeuber-Arp	1889–1943	artist, painter, sculptor	Franc	50 Fr.	obverse	1995–

== Syria ==
Currency: Pound (£S; since 1919)

Person	Lifespan	Reason for honor	Denomination	Obverse or reverse	In Circulation
Marcus Julius Philippus (Philip the Arab)	c. 204–249	29th Emperor of the Roman Empire	£S 100	Obverse	1998
Ṣalāḥ ad-Dīn Yūsuf ibn Ayyūb (Saladin)	1138–1193	Sultan of Egypt and Syria and Kurdish General	£S 200	Obverse	1997
Zenobia	240-c. 275	Queen of the Palmyrene Empire (267–271)	£S 500	Obverse	1998
*Hafez al-Assad	1930–2000	President of Syria (1971–2000)	£S 1,000	Obverse	1997
*Bashar al-Assad	1965	President of Syria (2000–2024)	£S 2,000	Obverse	2017

== São Tomé and Príncipe ==
(São Tomé and Príncipe) Currency: Dobra (Db; 1977–present)

Person	Lifespan	Reason for honor	Denomination	Obverse or reverse	Years of circulation
Rei Amador	?-1596	King of the Angolars	All (500-50,000 dobras)	Obverse	1993– (500 and 1,000 dobras); 1996– (5,000–50,000 dobras)
Francisco José Tenreiro	1921–1963	Geographer and poet	100,000 dobras	Obverse	2005–
Rei Amador	?-1596	King of the Angolars	200 dobras	Obverse	2020–

== Taiwan (Republic of China) ==
Currency Old Taiwan dollar (TW$; 1946–1949)
New Taiwan dollar (NT$; since 1949)

Person	Lifespan	Reason for honour	Currency	Denomination	Obverse or reverse	Years of circulation
Sun Yat-sen	1866-1925	Founding father of the Republic of China; Provincial President of the Republic of China (January 1 – March 10, 1912)	Old Taiwan dollar	All (1-500 Old Taiwan dollars)	Obverse	1946
Sun Yat-sen	1866-1925	Founding father of the Republic of China; Provincial President of the Republic of China (January 1 – March 10, 1912)	Old Taiwan dollar	All (100-100,000 Old Taiwan dollars)	Obverse	1947-1949
Sun Yat-sen	1866-1925	Founding father of the Republic of China; Provincial President of the Republic of China (January 1 – March 10, 1912)	New Taiwan dollar	10 and 50 cents, 1-, 5, 10 and 100 New Taiwan dollars	Obverse	1949
Sun Yat-sen	1866-1925	Founding father of the Republic of China; Provincial President of the Republic of China (January 1 – March 10, 1912)	New Taiwan dollar	All (1-100 New Taiwan dollars)	Obverse	1954 (1 New Taiwan dollar); 1955 (5 New Taiwan dollars); 1960-1976 (10 New Taiwan dollars); 1961-1972 (50 New Taiwan dollars); 1961-1987 (100 New Taiwan dollars)
Chiang Kai-shek	1887-1975	President of the Republic of China (1948–1975)	New Taiwan dollar	500 and 1,000 New Taiwan dollars	Obverse	1976-1981
Sun Yat-sen	1866–1925	Founding father of the Republic of China; Provincial President of the Republic of China (January 1 – March 10, 1912)	New Taiwan dollar	$100	obverse	2001–
Chiang Kai-shek	1887–1975	President of the Republic of China (1948–1975)	New Taiwan dollar	$200	obverse	2002–

== Tajikistan ==
(Tajikistan) Currency: Somoni (since 1999)
Symbol: cомонӣ

Person	Lifespan	Reason for honor	Denomination	Obverse or reverse	In Circulation
Isma'il ibn Ahmad (Somoni)	849–907	Amir of Transoxiana (892–907) and Khorasan (900–907)	1 dirams	Obverse	1999
Isma'il ibn Ahmad (Somoni)	849–907	Amir of Transoxiana (892–907) and Khorasan (900–907)	5 dirams	Obverse	1999
Isma'il ibn Ahmad (Somoni)	849–907	Amir of Transoxiana (892–907) and Khorasan (900–907)	20 dirams	Obverse	1999
Isma'il ibn Ahmad (Somoni)	849–907	Amir of Transoxiana (892–907) and Khorasan (900–907)	50 dirams	Obverse	1999
Mirzo Tursunzoda	1911–1977	Poet	1 somoni	Obverse	1999–2000
Shirinsho Shotemur	1899–1937	Politician	3 somoni	Obverse	2010
Sadriddin Ayni	1878–1954	Poet, writer, novelist, journalist and historian; recipient of the Order of Lenin	5 somoni	Obverse	1999–2013
Mir Sayyid Ali Hamadani	1314–1384	Sūfī of the Kubrāwī order, poet and a prominent Muslim scholar	10 somoni	Obverse	1999–2013
Avicenna (Ibn Sīnā)	980–1037	Polymath and jurist	20 somoni	Obverse	1999–2013
Bobojon Ghafurov	1908–1977	Historian, academician, and author	50 somoni	Obverse	1999–2013
Isma'il ibn Ahmad (Somoni)	849–907	Amir of Transoxiana (892–907) and Khorasan (900–907)	100 somoni	Obverse	1999–2013
Nusratullo Maksum	1881–1937	Statesman and national hero of Tajikistan	200 somoni	Obverse	2010
Rudaki (Abuabdulloh Rudaki)	858–941	Founder of Tajik classic literature	500 somoni	Obverse	2010

== Tanzania ==
(Tanzania) Currency: Shilling (since 1966)
Symbol: TSh

Person	Lifespan	Reason for honor	Denomination	Obverse or reverse	In Circulation
Julius Kambarage Nyerere	1922–1999	1st President of Tanzania (1964–1985)	1,000 Shillings/Shilingi	Obverse	2003

== Thailand ==
(Thailand) Currency: Baht (since 1925)
Symbol: ฿

Person	Lifespan	Reason for honor	Denomination	Obverse or reverse	In Circulation
Rama X	1952–	King of Thailand (2016–)	฿20	Obverse	2018
Rama X	1952–	King of Thailand (2016–)	฿50	Obverse	2018
Rama X	1952–	King of Thailand (2016–)	฿100	Obverse	2018
Rama X	1952–	King of Thailand (2016–)	฿500	Obverse	2018
Rama X	1952–	King of Thailand (2016–)	฿1,000	Obverse	2018
Rama X	1952–	King of Thailand (2016–)	฿1,000	Reverse	2018
Rama I	1737–1809	King of Rattanakosin (1782–1809)	฿20	Reverse	2018
Rama II	1767–1824	King of Rattanakosin (1809–1824)	฿20	Reverse	2018
Rama III	1788–1851	King of Rattanakosin (1824–1851)	฿50	Reverse	2018
Rama IV	1804–1868	King of Siam (1851–1868)	฿50	Reverse	2018
Rama V	1853–1910	King of Siam (1868–1910)	฿100	Reverse	2018
Rama VI	1881–1925	King of Siam (1910–1925)	฿100	Reverse	2018
Rama VII	1893–1941	King of Siam (1925–1935)	฿500	Reverse	2018
Rama VIII	1925–1946	King of Siam (1935–1946)	฿500	Reverse	2018
Rama IX	1927–2016	King of Thailand (1946–2016)	฿1,000	Reverse	2018

== Thailand/Siam ==
(Thailand) Currency: Baht (฿; since 1925)

Person	Lifespan	Reason for honour	Currency	Denomination	Obverse or reverse	Years of circulation
Prajadhipok	1893–1941	King of Siam (1925–1935)	Baht	฿1	Obverse	1934–1935
Prajadhipok	1893–1941	King of Siam (1925–1935)	Baht	฿5	Obverse	1934–1935
Prajadhipok	1893–1941	King of Siam (1925–1935)	Baht	฿10	Obverse	1934–1935
Prajadhipok	1893–1941	King of Siam (1925–1935)	Baht	฿20	Obverse	1934–1935
Prajadhipok	1893–1941	King of Siam (1925–1935)	Baht	฿50	Reverse	1985–1997
Ananda Mahidol	1925–1946	King of Siam (1935–1946)	Baht	฿1	Obverse	1935–1948
Ananda Mahidol	1925–1946	King of Siam (1935–1946)	Baht	฿5	Obverse	1935–1948
Ananda Mahidol	1925–1946	King of Siam (1935–1946)	Baht	฿10	Obverse	1935–1948
Ananda Mahidol	1925–1946	King of Siam (1935–1946)	Baht	฿20	Obverse	1935–1948
Ananda Mahidol	1925–1946	King of Siam (1935–1946)	Baht	฿1,000	Obverse	1938–1942
Ananda Mahidol	1925–1946	King of Siam (1935–1946)	Baht	฿100	Obverse	1942–1948
Ananda Mahidol	1925–1946	King of Siam (1935–1946)	Baht	50 satang (฿0.50)	Obverse	1942–1948
Ananda Mahidol	1925–1946	King of Siam (1935–1946)	Baht	฿50	Obverse	1945–1946
Ananda Mahidol	1925–1946	King of Siam (1935–1946)	Baht	฿20	Reverse	2003–2013
Bhumibol Adulyadej	1927–2016	King of Thailand (1946–2016)	Baht	฿1	Obverse	1948–1969
Bhumibol Adulyadej	1927–2016	King of Thailand (1946–2016)	Baht	฿5	Obverse	1948–1976
Bhumibol Adulyadej	1927–2016	King of Thailand (1946–2016)	Baht	฿10	Obverse	1948–1988
Bhumibol Adulyadej	1927–2016	King of Thailand (1946–2016)	Baht	฿20	Obverse	1948–2018
Bhumibol Adulyadej	1927–2016	King of Thailand (1946–2016)	Baht	฿100	Obverse	1948–2018
Bhumibol Adulyadej	1927–2016	King of Thailand (1946–2016)	Baht	฿500	Obverse	1975–2018
Bhumibol Adulyadej	1927–2016	King of Thailand (1946–2016)	Baht	฿50	Obverse	1985–2018
Bhumibol Adulyadej	1927–2016	King of Thailand (1946–2016)	Baht	฿1,000	Obverse	1992–2018
Bhumibol Adulyadej	1927–2016	King of Thailand (1946–2016)	Baht	฿1,000	Reverse	1992–2015
Naresuan	1555/1556–1605	King of Ayutthaya (1590–1605)	Baht	฿100	Reverse	1978–1994
Naresuan	1555/1556–1605	King of Ayutthaya (1590–1605)	Baht	฿50	Reverse	2012–2018
Chulalongkorn	1853–1910	King of Siam (1868–1910)	Baht	฿10	Reverse	1980–1988
Chulalongkorn	1853–1910	King of Siam (1868–1910)	Baht	฿100	Reverse	1994–2015
Chulalongkorn	1853–1910	King of Siam (1868–1910)	Baht	฿1,000	Reverse	2015–2018
Taksin	1734–1782	King of Thonburi (1767–1782)	Baht	฿20	Reverse	1981–2003
Taksin	1734–1782	King of Thonburi (1767–1782)	Baht	฿100	Reverse	2015–2018
Rama I	1737–1809	King of Rattanakosin (1782–1809)	Baht	฿500	Reverse	1987–2001
Rama I	1737–1809	King of Rattanakosin (1782–1809)	Baht	฿500	Reverse	2014–2018
Sirikit	1932–	Queen consort of Thailand (1950–2016)	Baht	฿1,000	Reverse	1992–1999
Vajiravudh	1881–1925	King of Siam (1910–1925)	Baht	฿100	Reverse	1994–2005
Rama II	1767–1824	King of Rattanakosin (1809–1824)	Baht	฿500	Reverse	1996–2001
Mongkut	1804–1868	King of Siam (1851–1868)	Baht	฿50	Reverse	1997–2012
Rama III	1788–1851	King of Rattanakosin (1824–1851)	Baht	฿500	Reverse	2001–2012
Ramkhamhaeng	1237/1247–1298	King of Sukhothai (1279–1298)	Baht	฿20	Reverse	2013–2018

== Tonga ==
(Tonga) Currency: Paʻanga (T$; since 1967)

Person	Lifespan	Reason for honour	Currency	Denomination	Obverse or reverse	Years of circulation
Sālote Tupou III	1900–1965	Queen of Tonga (1918–1965)	Paʻanga	All (1/2-10 paʻanga)	Obverse	1967–1973
Tāufaʻāhau Tupou IV	1918–2006	King of Tonga (1965–2006)	Paʻanga	All (1/2-50 paʻanga)	Obverse	1973–1995
Person	Lifespan	Reason for honor	Paʻanga	Denomination	Obverse or reverse	
King Siaosi (George) Tupou V of Tonga	1948–2012	King of Tonga (2006–2012)	Paʻanga	All (T$1–100)	Obverse	
King Tupou VI of Tonga	1959–	King of Tonga (2012–)	Paʻanga	All (T$2–100)	Obverse	

== Transnistria ==
(Transnistria) Currency: Rubla (since 1994)
Symbol:

Person	Lifespan	Reason for honor	Denomination	Obverse or reverse	In Circulation
Alexander Suvorov	1730–1800	General of the Imperial Russian Army; founder of the city and capital of Tiraspol	1 ruble	Obverse	2000
Alexander Suvorov	1730–1800	General of the Imperial Russian Army; founder of the city and capital of Tiraspol	5 rubles	Obverse	2000
Alexander Suvorov	1730–1800	General of the Imperial Russian Army; founder of the city and capital of Tiraspol	10 rubles	Obverse	2000
Alexander Suvorov	1730–1800	General of the Imperial Russian Army; founder of the city and capital of Tiraspol	25 rubles	Obverse	2000
Taras Shevchenko	1814–1861	Poet; founder of the modern Ukrainian literature and the modern Ukrainian language	50 rubles	Obverse	2000
Dimitrie Cantemir	1673–1723	Prince of Moldavia	100 rubles	Obverse	2000
Pyotr Alexandrovich Rumyantsev-Zadunaisky	1725–1796	General of the Russian Empire, Collegium of Little Russia	200 rubles	Obverse	2004
Catherine II (the Great)	1729–1796	Empress of the Russian Empire	500 rubles	Obverse	2004

== Tunisia ==
(Tunisia) Currency: Dinar (since 1960)
Symbol: DT

Person	Lifespan	Reason for honor	Denomination	Obverse or reverse	Years of circulation
Hannibal	247–183, 182 or 181 BC	General and commander-in-chief of the Carthaginian armies	5 dinars	Obverse	1993–
Hannibal	247–183, 182 or 181 BC	General and commander-in-chief of the Carthaginian armies	5 dinars	Obverse	2013–
Ibn Khaldun	1332-1046	Historiographer and historian	10 dinars	Obverse	1994–
Dido		Queen and founder of Carthage	10 dinars	Obverse	2005–
Aboul-Qacem Echebbi	1909–1934	Poet	10 dinars	Obverse	2013–
Tawhida Ben Cheikh	1909–2010	First female doctor of Tunisia	10 dinars	Obverse	2020–
Hayreddin Pasha	1820–1890	Grand Vizier of the Beylik of Tunis (1873–1877); Grand Vizier of the Ottoman Empire (1878–1879)	20 dinars	Obverse	1992–
Hayreddin Pasha	1820–1890	Grand Vizier of the Beylik of Tunis (1873–1877); Grand Vizier of the Ottoman Empire (1878–1879)	20 dinars	Obverse	2011–
Farhat Hached	1914–1952	Trades Union leader; leader of the Tunisian Independence Movement	20 dinars	Obverse	2017–
Aboul-Qacem Echebbi	1909–1934	Poet	30 dinars	Obverse	1997–
Ibn El Rachiq Kairouani	c. 1000–1064	Writer and poet	50 dinars	Obverse	2011–

== Turkey ==
(Turkey) Currency: Lira (TL, 1843–2005)
New Lira (₺, 2005–present)

Person	Lifespan	Reason for honour	Currency	Denomination	Obverse or reverse	Years of circulation
Mustafa Kemal Atatürk	1881–1938	Founder and 1st President of the Republic of Turkey (1923–1938)	Lira	TL 2½	obverse	1939–1952
Mustafa Kemal Atatürk	1881–1938	Founder and 1st President of the Republic of Turkey (1923–1938)	Lira	TL 2½	obverse	1952–1966
Mustafa Kemal Atatürk	1881–1938	Founder and 1st President of the Republic of Turkey (1923–1938)	Lira	TL 2½	obverse	1955–1966
Mustafa Kemal Atatürk	1881–1938	Founder and 1st President of the Republic of Turkey (1923–1938)	Lira	TL 2½	obverse	1957–1966
Mustafa Kemal Atatürk	1881–1938	Founder and 1st President of the Republic of Turkey (1923–1938)	Lira	TL 2½	obverse	1960–1966
Mustafa Kemal Atatürk	1881–1938	Founder and 1st President of the Republic of Turkey (1923–1938)	Lira	TL 5	obverse	1937–1952
Mustafa Kemal Atatürk	1881–1938	Founder and 1st President of the Republic of Turkey (1923–1938)	Lira	TL 5	obverse	1952–1968
Mustafa Kemal Atatürk	1881–1938	Founder and 1st President of the Republic of Turkey (1923–1938)	Lira	TL 5	obverse	1959–1968
Mustafa Kemal Atatürk	1881–1938	Founder and 1st President of the Republic of Turkey (1923–1938)	Lira	TL 5	obverse	1961–1968
Mustafa Kemal Atatürk	1881–1938	Founder and 1st President of the Republic of Turkey (1923–1938)	Lira	TL 5	obverse	1965–1968
Mustafa Kemal Atatürk	1881–1938	Founder and 1st President of the Republic of Turkey (1923–1938)	Lira	TL 5	obverse	1968–1983
Mustafa Kemal Atatürk	1881–1938	Founder and 1st President of the Republic of Turkey (1923–1938)	Lira	TL 5	obverse	1976–1983
Mustafa Kemal Atatürk	1881–1938	Founder and 1st President of the Republic of Turkey (1923–1938)	Lira	TL 10	obverse	1938–1952
Mustafa Kemal Atatürk	1881–1938	Founder and 1st President of the Republic of Turkey (1923–1938)	Lira	TL 10	obverse	1952–1966
Mustafa Kemal Atatürk	1881–1938	Founder and 1st President of the Republic of Turkey (1923–1938)	Lira	TL 10	obverse	1953–1966
Mustafa Kemal Atatürk	1881–1938	Founder and 1st President of the Republic of Turkey (1923–1938)	Lira	TL 10	obverse	1958–1966
Mustafa Kemal Atatürk	1881–1938	Founder and 1st President of the Republic of Turkey (1923–1938)	Lira	TL 10	obverse	1960–1966
Mustafa Kemal Atatürk	1881–1938	Founder and 1st President of the Republic of Turkey (1923–1938)	Lira	TL 10	obverse	1961–1966
Mustafa Kemal Atatürk	1881–1938	Founder and 1st President of the Republic of Turkey (1923–1938)	Lira	TL 10	obverse	1963–1966
Mustafa Kemal Atatürk	1881–1938	Founder and 1st President of the Republic of Turkey (1923–1938)	Lira	TL 10	obverse	1966–1981
Mustafa Kemal Atatürk	1881–1938	Founder and 1st President of the Republic of Turkey (1923–1938)	Lira	TL 10	obverse	1975–1981
Mustafa Kemal Atatürk	1881–1938	Founder and 1st President of the Republic of Turkey (1923–1938)	Lira	TL 10	both	1979–1987
Mustafa Kemal Atatürk	1881–1938	Founder and 1st President of the Republic of Turkey (1923–1938)	Lira	TL 10	both	1982–1987
Mustafa Kemal Atatürk	1881–1938	Founder and 1st President of the Republic of Turkey (1923–1938)	Lira	TL 20	obverse	1966–1987
Mustafa Kemal Atatürk	1881–1938	Founder and 1st President of the Republic of Turkey (1923–1938)	Lira	TL 20	obverse	1974–1987
Mustafa Kemal Atatürk	1881–1938	Founder and 1st President of the Republic of Turkey (1923–1938)	Lira	TL 20	obverse	1979–1987
Mustafa Kemal Atatürk	1881–1938	Founder and 1st President of the Republic of Turkey (1923–1938)	Lira	TL 20	obverse	1983–1987
Mustafa Kemal Atatürk	1881–1938	Founder and 1st President of the Republic of Turkey (1923–1938)	Lira	TL 50	obverse	1927–1938
Mustafa Kemal Atatürk	1881–1938	Founder and 1st President of the Republic of Turkey (1923–1938)	Lira	TL 50	obverse	1938–1952
Mustafa Kemal Atatürk	1881–1938	Founder and 1st President of the Republic of Turkey (1923–1938)	Lira	TL 50	obverse	1951–1979
Mustafa Kemal Atatürk	1881–1938	Founder and 1st President of the Republic of Turkey (1923–1938)	Lira	TL 50	obverse	1953–1979
Mustafa Kemal Atatürk	1881–1938	Founder and 1st President of the Republic of Turkey (1923–1938)	Lira	TL 50	obverse	1956–1979
Mustafa Kemal Atatürk	1881–1938	Founder and 1st President of the Republic of Turkey (1923–1938)	Lira	TL 50	obverse	1957–1979
Mustafa Kemal Atatürk	1881–1938	Founder and 1st President of the Republic of Turkey (1923–1938)	Lira	TL 50	obverse	1960–1979
Mustafa Kemal Atatürk	1881–1938	Founder and 1st President of the Republic of Turkey (1923–1938)	Lira	TL 50	obverse	1964–1979
Mustafa Kemal Atatürk	1881–1938	Founder and 1st President of the Republic of Turkey (1923–1938)	Lira	TL 50	obverse	1971–1979
Mustafa Kemal Atatürk	1881–1938	Founder and 1st President of the Republic of Turkey (1923–1938)	Lira	TL 50	obverse	1976–1987
Mustafa Kemal Atatürk	1881–1938	Founder and 1st President of the Republic of Turkey (1923–1938)	Lira	TL 50	obverse	1983–1987
Mustafa Kemal Atatürk	1881–1938	Founder and 1st President of the Republic of Turkey (1923–1938)	Lira	TL 100	obverse	1927–1938
Mustafa Kemal Atatürk	1881–1938	Founder and 1st President of the Republic of Turkey (1923–1938)	Lira	TL 100	obverse	1938–1942
Mustafa Kemal Atatürk	1881–1938	Founder and 1st President of the Republic of Turkey (1923–1938)	Lira	TL 100	obverse	1952–1976
Mustafa Kemal Atatürk	1881–1938	Founder and 1st President of the Republic of Turkey (1923–1938)	Lira	TL 100	obverse	1956–1976
Mustafa Kemal Atatürk	1881–1938	Founder and 1st President of the Republic of Turkey (1923–1938)	Lira	TL 100	obverse	1958–1976
Mustafa Kemal Atatürk	1881–1938	Founder and 1st President of the Republic of Turkey (1923–1938)	Lira	TL 100	obverse	1962–1976
Mustafa Kemal Atatürk	1881–1938	Founder and 1st President of the Republic of Turkey (1923–1938)	Lira	TL 100	obverse	1964–1976
Mustafa Kemal Atatürk	1881–1938	Founder and 1st President of the Republic of Turkey (1923–1938)	Lira	TL 100	obverse	1969–1976
Mustafa Kemal Atatürk	1881–1938	Founder and 1st President of the Republic of Turkey (1923–1938)	Lira	TL 100	obverse	1972–1986
Mustafa Kemal Atatürk	1881–1938	Founder and 1st President of the Republic of Turkey (1923–1938)	Lira	TL 100	obverse	1979–1986
Mustafa Kemal Atatürk	1881–1938	Founder and 1st President of the Republic of Turkey (1923–1938)	Lira	TL 100	obverse	1983–1986
Mustafa Kemal Atatürk	1881–1938	Founder and 1st President of the Republic of Turkey (1923–1938)	Lira	TL 100	obverse	1984–1989
Mustafa Kemal Atatürk	1881–1938	Founder and 1st President of the Republic of Turkey (1923–1938)	Lira	TL 500	obverse	1927–1939
Mustafa Kemal Atatürk	1881–1938	Founder and 1st President of the Republic of Turkey (1923–1938)	Lira	TL 500	obverse	1939–1946
Mustafa Kemal Atatürk	1881–1938	Founder and 1st President of the Republic of Turkey (1923–1938)	Lira	TL 500	obverse	1953–1976
Mustafa Kemal Atatürk	1881–1938	Founder and 1st President of the Republic of Turkey (1923–1938)	Lira	TL 500	obverse	1959–1976
Mustafa Kemal Atatürk	1881–1938	Founder and 1st President of the Republic of Turkey (1923–1938)	Lira	TL 500	obverse	1962–1976
Mustafa Kemal Atatürk	1881–1938	Founder and 1st President of the Republic of Turkey (1923–1938)	Lira	TL 500	obverse	1968–1976
Mustafa Kemal Atatürk	1881–1938	Founder and 1st President of the Republic of Turkey (1923–1938)	Lira	TL 500	obverse	1971–1984
Mustafa Kemal Atatürk	1881–1938	Founder and 1st President of the Republic of Turkey (1923–1938)	Lira	TL 500	obverse	1974–1984
Mustafa Kemal Atatürk	1881–1938	Founder and 1st President of the Republic of Turkey (1923–1938)	Lira	TL 500	obverse	1983–1989
Mustafa Kemal Atatürk	1881–1938	Founder and 1st President of the Republic of Turkey (1923–1938)	Lira	TL 500	obverse	1984–1989
Mustafa Kemal Atatürk	1881–1938	Founder and 1st President of the Republic of Turkey (1923–1938)	Lira	TL 1,000	obverse	1927–1939
Mustafa Kemal Atatürk	1881–1938	Founder and 1st President of the Republic of Turkey (1923–1938)	Lira	TL 1,000	obverse	1939–1946
Mustafa Kemal Atatürk	1881–1938	Founder and 1st President of the Republic of Turkey (1923–1938)	Lira	TL 1,000	obverse	1953–1979
Mustafa Kemal Atatürk	1881–1938	Founder and 1st President of the Republic of Turkey (1923–1938)	Lira	TL 1,000	obverse	1978–1986
Mustafa Kemal Atatürk	1881–1938	Founder and 1st President of the Republic of Turkey (1923–1938)	Lira	TL 1,000	obverse	1979–1986
Mustafa Kemal Atatürk	1881–1938	Founder and 1st President of the Republic of Turkey (1923–1938)	Lira	TL 1,000	obverse	1981–1986
Mustafa Kemal Atatürk	1881–1938	Founder and 1st President of the Republic of Turkey (1923–1938)	Lira	TL 1,000	obverse	1986–1992
Mustafa Kemal Atatürk	1881–1938	Founder and 1st President of the Republic of Turkey (1923–1938)	Lira	TL 1,000	obverse	1988–1992
Mustafa Kemal Atatürk	1881–1938	Founder and 1st President of the Republic of Turkey (1923–1938)	Lira	TL 5,000	obverse	1981–1994
Mustafa Kemal Atatürk	1881–1938	Founder and 1st President of the Republic of Turkey (1923–1938)	Lira	TL 5,000	obverse	1985–1994
Mustafa Kemal Atatürk	1881–1938	Founder and 1st President of the Republic of Turkey (1923–1938)	Lira	TL 5,000	obverse	1988–1994
Mustafa Kemal Atatürk	1881–1938	Founder and 1st President of the Republic of Turkey (1923–1938)	Lira	TL 5,000	obverse	1990–1994
Mustafa Kemal Atatürk	1881–1938	Founder and 1st President of the Republic of Turkey (1923–1938)	Lira	TL 10,000	obverse	1982–1995
Mustafa Kemal Atatürk	1881–1938	Founder and 1st President of the Republic of Turkey (1923–1938)	Lira	TL 10,000	obverse	1984–1995
Mustafa Kemal Atatürk	1881–1938	Founder and 1st President of the Republic of Turkey (1923–1938)	Lira	TL 10,000	obverse	1989–1995
Mustafa Kemal Atatürk	1881–1938	Founder and 1st President of the Republic of Turkey (1923–1938)	Lira	TL 10,000	obverse	1993–1995
Mustafa Kemal Atatürk	1881–1938	Founder and 1st President of the Republic of Turkey (1923–1938)	Lira	TL 20,000	obverse	1988–1997
Mustafa Kemal Atatürk	1881–1938	Founder and 1st President of the Republic of Turkey (1923–1938)	Lira	TL 20,000	obverse	1995–1997
Mustafa Kemal Atatürk	1881–1938	Founder and 1st President of the Republic of Turkey (1923–1938)	Lira	TL 50,000	obverse	1989–1999
Mustafa Kemal Atatürk	1881–1938	Founder and 1st President of the Republic of Turkey (1923–1938)	Lira	TL 50,000	obverse	1995–1999
Mustafa Kemal Atatürk	1881–1938	Founder and 1st President of the Republic of Turkey (1923–1938)	Lira	TL 100,000	both	1991–2001
Mustafa Kemal Atatürk	1881–1938	Founder and 1st President of the Republic of Turkey (1923–1938)	Lira	TL 100,000	both	1994–2001
Mustafa Kemal Atatürk	1881–1938	Founder and 1st President of the Republic of Turkey (1923–1938)	Lira	TL 100,000	both	1996–2001
Mustafa Kemal Atatürk	1881–1938	Founder and 1st President of the Republic of Turkey (1923–1938)	Lira	TL 250,000	obverse	1992–2006
Mustafa Kemal Atatürk	1881–1938	Founder and 1st President of the Republic of Turkey (1923–1938)	Lira	TL 250,000	obverse	1995–2006
Mustafa Kemal Atatürk	1881–1938	Founder and 1st President of the Republic of Turkey (1923–1938)	Lira	TL 250,000	obverse	1998–2006
Mustafa Kemal Atatürk	1881–1938	Founder and 1st President of the Republic of Turkey (1923–1938)	Lira	TL 500,000	obverse	1993–2006
Mustafa Kemal Atatürk	1881–1938	Founder and 1st President of the Republic of Turkey (1923–1938)	Lira	TL 500,000	obverse	1994–2006
Mustafa Kemal Atatürk	1881–1938	Founder and 1st President of the Republic of Turkey (1923–1938)	Lira	TL 500,000	obverse	1997–2006
Mustafa Kemal Atatürk	1881–1938	Founder and 1st President of the Republic of Turkey (1923–1938)	Lira	TL 1,000,000	obverse	1995–2006
Mustafa Kemal Atatürk	1881–1938	Founder and 1st President of the Republic of Turkey (1923–1938)	Lira	TL 1,000,000	obverse	1996–2006
Mustafa Kemal Atatürk	1881–1938	Founder and 1st President of the Republic of Turkey (1923–1938)	Lira	TL 1,000,000	obverse	2002–2006
Mustafa Kemal Atatürk	1881–1938	Founder and 1st President of the Republic of Turkey (1923–1938)	Lira	TL 5,000,000	obverse	1997–2006
Mustafa Kemal Atatürk	1881–1938	Founder and 1st President of the Republic of Turkey (1923–1938)	Lira	TL 10,000,000	obverse	1999–2006
Mustafa Kemal Atatürk	1881–1938	Founder and 1st President of the Republic of Turkey (1923–1938)	Lira	TL 20,000,000	obverse	2001–2006
Mehmet Akif Ersoy	1873–1936	Poet; author of the lyrics to the National Anthem	Lira	TL 100	reverse	1983–1989
Mehmet Akif Ersoy	1873–1936	Poet; author of the lyrics to the National Anthem	Lira	TL 100	reverse	1984–1989
İsmet İnönü	1884–1973	2nd President of Turkey (1938–1950)	Lira	50 kuruş	obverse	1944–1947
İsmet İnönü	1884–1973	2nd President of Turkey (1938–1950)	Lira	TL 1	obverse	1942–1947
İsmet İnönü	1884–1973	2nd President of Turkey (1938–1950)	Lira	TL 2½	obverse	1947–1952
İsmet İnönü	1884–1973	2nd President of Turkey (1938–1950)	Lira	TL 10	obverse	1942–1950
İsmet İnönü	1884–1973	2nd President of Turkey (1938–1950)	Lira	TL 10	obverse	1947–1952
İsmet İnönü	1884–1973	2nd President of Turkey (1938–1950)	Lira	TL 10	obverse	1948–1952
İsmet İnönü	1884–1973	2nd President of Turkey (1938–1950)	Lira	TL 50	obverse	1942–1951
İsmet İnönü	1884–1973	2nd President of Turkey (1938–1950)	Lira	TL 50	obverse	1947–1951
İsmet İnönü	1884–1973	2nd President of Turkey (1938–1950)	Lira	TL 100	obverse	1942–1946
İsmet İnönü	1884–1973	2nd President of Turkey (1938–1950)	Lira	TL 100	obverse	1947–1952
İsmet İnönü	1884–1973	2nd President of Turkey (1938–1950)	Lira	TL 500	obverse	1940–1946
İsmet İnönü	1884–1973	2nd President of Turkey (1938–1950)	Lira	TL 500	obverse	1946–1953
İsmet İnönü	1884–1973	2nd President of Turkey (1938–1950)	Lira	TL 1,000	obverse	1940–1946
İsmet İnönü	1884–1973	2nd President of Turkey (1938–1950)	Lira	TL 1,000	obverse	1946–1953
Mehmed II	1432–1481	Sultan of the Ottoman Empire (1444–1446) and (1451–1481)	Lira	TL 1,000	reverse	1986–1989
Mehmed II	1432–1481	Sultan of the Ottoman Empire (1444–1446) and (1451–1481)	Lira	TL 1,000	reverse	1988–1992
Jalal ad-Din Muhammad Rumi	1207–1273	Persian theologian and poet; his followers founded the Mevlevi Order, or "Whirling Dervishes"	Lira	TL 5,000	reverse	1981–1994
Jalal ad-Din Muhammad Rumi	1207–1273	Persian theologian and poet; his followers founded the Mevlevi Order, or "Whirling Dervishes"	Lira	TL 5,000	reverse	1985–1994
Jalal ad-Din Muhammad Rumi	1207–1273	Persian theologian and poet; his followers founded the Mevlevi Order, or "Whirling Dervishes"	Lira	TL 5,000	reverse	1988–1994
Mimar Sinan	1489–1588	Chief architect of the Ottoman Empire (1512–1588)	Lira	TL 10,000	reverse	1982–1995
Mimar Sinan	1489–1588	Chief architect of the Ottoman Empire (1512–1588)	Lira	TL 10,000	reverse	1984–1995
Mimar Sinan	1489–1588	Chief architect of the Ottoman Empire (1512–1588)	Lira	TL 10,000	reverse	1989–1995
Mimar Sinan	1489–1588	Chief architect of the Ottoman Empire (1512–1588)	Lira	TL 10,000	reverse	1993–1995
Person	Lifespan	Reason for honor	Lira	Denomination	Obverse or reverse	
Mustafa Kemal Atatürk	1881–1938	Founder and 1st President of Turkey (1923–1938)	Lira	All (₺5-₺200)	Obverse	
Aydın Sayılı	1913–1993	Historian of science	Lira	₺5	Obverse	
Cahit Arf	1910–1997	Mathematician; known for the Arf invariant of a quadratic form in characteristic 2 (applied in knot theory and surgery theory) in topology, the Hasse–Arf theorem in ramification theory, Arf semigroups, and Arf rings	Lira	₺10	Obverse	
Mimar Kemalettin (Ahmet Kemalettin)	1870–1927	Architect	Lira	₺20	Obverse	
Fatma Aliye Topuz	1862–1936	Novelist, columnist, essayist, women's rights activist and humanitarian	Lira	₺50	Obverse	
Buhurizade Mustafa Itri	1640–1712	Musician, singer, composer and poet	Lira	₺100	Obverse	
Yunus Emre	1238–1320	Poet and mystic	Lira	₺200	Obverse	

== Turkmenistan ==
(Turkmenistan) Currency: First manat (1993–2005)

Person	Lifespan	Reason for honour	Currency	Denomination	Obverse or reverse	Years of circulation
Saparmurat Atayevich Niyazov	1940–2006	1st President of Turkmenistan (1990–2006)	First manat	(10–500 manats); (1,000–10,000 manats); (50-10,000 manats)	Obverse	1993–1995 (10–500 manats); 1995–2005 (1,000–10,000 manats); 2005 (50-5,000 manats)
Togrul Beg	990–1063	Sultan of the Seljuq Empire	New manat	1 manat	Obverse	2009–
Soltan Sanjar	1085–1157	Governor of Khorasan (1097–1118); Sultan of the Seljuq Empire (1118–1153, 1156–1157)	New manat	5 manats	Obverse	2009–
Magtymguly Pyragy	1724–1807	Poet	New manat	10 manats	Obverse	2009–
Görogly		National hero	New manat	20 manats	Obverse	2009–
Dede Korkut		Legendary bard	New manat	50 manats	Obverse	2009–
Oghuz Khagan		Legendary ancestor of Turkmens	New manat	100 manats	Obverse	2009–
Saparmurat Atayevich Niyazov	1940–2006	First President of Turkmenistan (1990–2006)	New manat	500 manats	Obverse	2009– (not issued)

== Ukraine ==
(Ukraine) Currency: Hryvnia (pl. Hryvni and Hryven) (₴, 1996–present)
Karbovanets (pl. Karbovantsi and Karbovantsiv) (крб, 1991–1996)

Person	Lifespan	Reason for honour	Currency	Denomination	Obverse or reverse	Years of circulation
Volodymyr I	958–1015	Prince of Kyiv and Novgorod (978–1015)	Hryvnia	₴1	obverse	1996–1997
Volodymyr I	958–1015	Prince of Kyiv and Novgorod (978–1015)	Hryvnia	₴1	obverse	1997–2004
Volodymyr I	958–1015	Prince of Kyiv and Novgorod (978–1015)	Hryvnia	₴1	obverse	2004–2006
Yaroslav I	978–1054	Prince of Kyiv and Novgorod	Hryvnia	₴2	obverse	1996–1997
Yaroslav I	978–1054	Prince of Kyiv and Novgorod	Hryvnia	₴2	obverse	1997–2001
Yaroslav I	978–1054	Prince of Kyiv and Novgorod	Hryvnia	₴2	obverse	2001–2004
Bohdan Khmelnytsky	1595–1657	Hetman of Ukraine (1648–1657)	Hryvnia	₴5	obverse	1996–1997
Bohdan Khmelnytsky	1595–1657	Hetman of Ukraine (1648–1657)	Hryvnia	₴5	obverse	1997–1998
Bohdan Khmelnytsky	1595–1657	Hetman of Ukraine (1648–1657)	Hryvnia	₴5	obverse	1998–2001
Bohdan Khmelnytsky	1595–1657	Hetman of Ukraine (1648–1657)	Hryvnia	₴5	obverse	2001–2004
Ivan Mazepa	1640–1709	Hetman of Ukraine (1687–1708)	Hryvnia	₴10	obverse	1996–1997
Ivan Mazepa	1640–1709	Hetman of Ukraine (1687–1708)	Hryvnia	₴10	obverse	1997–2000
Ivan Mazepa	1640–1709	Hetman of Ukraine (1687–1708)	Hryvnia	₴10	obverse	2000–2004
Ivan Franko	1856–1916	Poet, writer and journalist	Hryvnia	₴20	obverse	1996–1997
Ivan Franko	1856–1916	Poet, writer and journalist	Hryvnia	₴20	obverse	1997–2000
Ivan Franko	1856–1916	Poet, writer and journalist	Hryvnia	₴20	obverse	2000–2003
Mykhailo Hrushevsky	1866–1934	1st President of the Ukrainian People's Republic (1917–1918)	Hryvnia	₴50	obverse	1996–2004
Taras Shevchenko	1814–1861	Poet; works considered to be the foundation of both the modern Ukrainian language and literature	Hryvnia	₴100	obverse	1996–2006
Lubid'	6th century	Founder of Kyiv	Karbovanets	All (1 крб, 3 крб, 5 крб, 10 крб, 25 крб, 50 крб, 100 крб)	obverse	1991–1996
Kyi, Shchek and Khoryv	6th century	Founders of Kyiv	Karbovanets	All (100 крб, 200 крб, 500 крб, 1,000 крб, 2,000 крб, 5,000 крб)	obverse	1992–1996
Volodymyr I	958–1015	Prince of Kyiv and Novgorod (978–1015)	Karbovanets	All (10,000 крб, 20,000 крб, 50,000 крб, 100,000 крб, 200,000 крб, 500,000 крб)	obverse	1993–1996
Taras Shevchenko	1814–1861	Poet; works considered to be the foundation of both the modern Ukrainian language and literature	Karbovanets	1,000,000 крб	obverse	1995–2006
Ivan Franko	1856–1916	Poet, writer and journalist	Hryvnia	₴20	obverse	2003–
Mykhailo Hrushevsky	1866–1934	1st President of the Ukrainian People's Republic (1917–1918)	Hryvnia	₴50	obverse	2004–
Bohdan Khmelnytsky	1595–1657	Hetman of Ukraine (1648–1657)	Hryvnia	₴5	obverse	2004–
Ivan Mazepa	1640–1709	Hetman of Ukraine (1687–1708)	Hryvnia	₴10	obverse	2004–
Taras Shevchenko	1814–1861	Poet; works considered to be the foundation of both the modern Ukrainian language and literature	Hryvnia	₴100	obverse	2006–
Hryhori Skovoroda	1722–1794	Poet, philosopher and composer	Hryvnia	₴500	obverse	2006–
Lesya Ukrainka	1871–1913	Poet and writer	Hryvnia	₴200	obverse	2001–
Vladimir I	958–1015	Prince of Kiev and Novgorod (978–1015)	Hryvnia	₴1	obverse	2006–
Vladimir Vernadsky	1863–1945	Historian, philosopher, naturalist and scientist	Hryvnia	₴1,000	obverse	2019–
Yaroslav I	978–1054	Prince of Kiev and Novgorod	Hryvnia	₴2	obverse	2004–

== United Kingdom ==
(United Kingdom) Currency: Sterling (£, 1158–Present in England; 1695–Present in Scotland)

=== England and Wales ===
(Wales) Bank of England

Person	Lifespan	Reason for honor	Currency	Denomination	Obverse or reverse	Years of circulation
Charles Darwin	1809–1882	Naturalist	Sterling	£10	reverse	2000–2018
Charles Dickens	1812–1870	Writer and social critic	Sterling	£10	reverse	1992–2003
Edward Elgar	1857–1934	Composer	Sterling	£20	reverse	1999–2010
Elizabeth II	1926–2022	Queen of the United Kingdom (1952–2022)	Sterling	£1	obverse	1978–1988
Elizabeth II	1926–2022	Queen of the United Kingdom (1952–2022)	Sterling	£5	obverse	1971–1991
Elizabeth II	1926–2022	Queen of the United Kingdom (1952–2022)	Sterling	£5	obverse	1990–2003
Elizabeth II	1926–2022	Queen of the United Kingdom (1952–2022)	Sterling	£5	obverse	2002–2017
Elizabeth II	1926–2022	Queen of the United Kingdom (1952–2022)	Sterling	£10	obverse	1975–1994
Elizabeth II	1926–2022	Queen of the United Kingdom (1952–2022)	Sterling	£10	obverse	1992–2003
Elizabeth II	1926–2022	Queen of the United Kingdom (1952–2022)	Sterling	£10	obverse	2000–2018
Elizabeth II	1926–2022	Queen of the United Kingdom (1952–2022)	Sterling	£20	obverse	1970–1993
Elizabeth II	1926–2022	Queen of the United Kingdom (1952–2022)	Sterling	£20	obverse	1991–2001
Elizabeth II	1926–2022	Queen of the United Kingdom (1952–2022)	Sterling	£50	obverse	1981–1996
Elizabeth Fry	1780–1845	Reformer	Sterling	£5	reverse	2002–2017
Michael Faraday	1791–1867	Physicist and chemist; significantly contributed to the fields of electromagnetism and electrochemistry	Sterling	£20	reverse	1991–2001
Isaac Newton	1643–1727	Physicist, mathematician and astronomer	Sterling	£1	reverse	1978–1988
Florence Nightingale	1820–1910	Pioneer of modern nursing (Note: Design incorporating Florence Nightingale suggested by Sydney Selwyn.)	Sterling	£10	reverse	1975–1994
William Shakespeare	1564–1616	Playwright and poet; regarded as the greatest writer of the English language	Sterling	£20	reverse	1970–1993
George Stephenson	1781–1848	Co-Created the Steam Locomotive 'The Rocket'	Sterling	£5	reverse	1990–2003
Arthur Wellesley	1769–1852	1st Duke of Wellington (1814–1852); Prime Minister (1828–1830 and 1834)	Sterling	£5	reverse	1971–1991
Christopher Wren	1632–1723	Architect; designer of St. Paul's Cathedral	Sterling	£50	reverse	1981–1996
John Houblon	1632–1710	1st Governor of the Bank of England (1694–1697)	Sterling	£50	reverse	1994–2014

Bank of England
Person	Lifespan	Reason for honor	Denomination	Obverse or reverse	Years of circulation
Elizabeth II	1926–2022	Queen of the United Kingdom (1952–2022)	£5	obverse	2002–
Elizabeth II	1926–2022	Queen of the United Kingdom (1952–2022)	£10	obverse	2000–
Elizabeth II	1926–2022	Queen of the United Kingdom (1952–2022)	£20	obverse	1999–
Elizabeth II	1926–2022	Queen of the United Kingdom (1952–2022)	£20	obverse	2007–
Elizabeth II	1926–2022	Queen of the United Kingdom (1952–2022)	£50	obverse	1994–2014
Elizabeth II	1926–2022	Queen of the United Kingdom (1952–2022)	£50	obverse	2011–
Charles III	1948-	King of the United Kingdom (2022-)	£5	obverse	2024–
Charles III	1948-	King of the United Kingdom (2022-)	£10	obverse	2024–
Charles III	1948-	King of the United Kingdom (2022-)	£20	obverse	2024–
Charles III	1948-	King of the United Kingdom (2022-)	£50	obverse	2024–
Winston Churchill	1874–1965	Prime Minister of the United Kingdom (1940–1945; 1951–1955)	£5	reverse	2016–
Jane Austen	1775–1817	Novelist	£10	reverse	2017–
Adam Smith	1723–1790	Economist	£20	reverse	2007–
J. M. W. Turner	1775–1851	Landscape painter	£20	reverse	2020–
Alan Turing	1912–1954	Mathematician and computer scientist	£50	reverse	2021–
James Watt	1736–1819	Inventor	£50	reverse	2011–
Matthew Boulton	1728–1809	Manufacturer	£50	reverse	2011–

=== Scotland ===
(Scotland) Clydesdale Bank

Person	Lifespan	Reason for honour	Denomination	Obverse or reverse	Years of circulation
Robert the Bruce	1274–1329	King of the Scots (1306–1329)	£1	obverse	1971-c.1989
David Livingstone	1813–1873	Scottish missionary and explorer in Central Africa.	£10	obverse	1971–1998
Lord Kelvin	1824–1907	mathematical physicist and engineer	£20	obverse	1971-c.1989

Bank of Scotland
Person	Lifespan	Reason for honor	Denomination	Obverse or reverse	Years of circulation
Sir Walter Scott	1771–1832	Historical novelist and poet; campaigner for the continuation of Scottish banknotes	£5	obverse	2007–
Sir Walter Scott	1771–1832	Historical novelist and poet; campaigner for the continuation of Scottish banknotes	£10	obverse	2007–
Sir Walter Scott	1771–1832	Historical novelist and poet; campaigner for the continuation of Scottish banknotes	£20	obverse	1999–
Sir Walter Scott	1771–1832	Historical novelist and poet; campaigner for the continuation of Scottish banknotes	£50	obverse	2007–
Sir Walter Scott	1771–1832	Historical novelist and poet; campaigner for the continuation of Scottish banknotes	£100	obverse	2007–
The Royal Bank of Scotland
Person	Lifespan	Reason for honor	Denomination	Obverse or reverse	Years of circulation
Lord Ilay	1682–1761	Founder and first governor of the Royal Bank of Scotland	£1	obverse	1987–
Lord Ilay	1682–1761	Founder and first governor of the Royal Bank of Scotland	£5	obverse	1987–
Lord Ilay	1682–1761	Founder and first governor of the Royal Bank of Scotland	£10	obverse	1987–
Lord Ilay	1682–1761	Founder and first governor of the Royal Bank of Scotland	£20	obverse	1987–
Lord Ilay	1682–1761	Founder and first governor of the Royal Bank of Scotland	£50	obverse	1987–
Lord Ilay	1682–1761	Founder and first governor of the Royal Bank of Scotland	£100	obverse	1987–
Robert Louis Stevenson	1850–1894	Scottish novelist, poet, essayist and travel writer (special commemorative issue)	£1	reverse	1994–
Alexander Graham Bell	1847–1922	Inventor of the telephone (special commemorative issue)	£1	reverse	1997–
Queen Elizabeth The Queen Mother	1900–2002	To mark the 100th birthday of The Queen Mother (special commemorative issue)	£20	reverse	2000–
Queen Elizabeth II	1926–2022	To mark the Golden Jubilee of Elizabeth II (special commemorative issue)	£5	reverse	2002–
Old Tom Morris	1821–1908	250th anniversary of The Royal and Ancient Golf Club of St Andrews (special commemorative issue)	£5	reverse	2004–
Jack Nicklaus	1940–	Notable American golfer (special commemorative issue)	£5	reverse	2005–
Queen Elizabeth II	1926–2022	To mark the Diamond Jubilee of Elizabeth II (special commemorative issue)	£10	reverse	2012–
Nan Shepherd	1893–1981	Novelist and poet	£5	obverse	2016–
Mary Somerville	1780–1872	Scientist	£10	obverse	2017–
Catherine Cranston	1849–1934	Entrepreneur	£20	obverse	2020–
Flora Stevenson	1839–1905	Social reformer with a special interest in education for poor or neglected children, and in education for girls; the first Scottish woman to be elected to a School Board	£50	obverse	2021–
Clydesdale Bank
Person	Lifespan	Reason for honor	Denomination	Obverse or reverse	Years of circulation
Robert Burns	1759–1796	Notable Scottish poet	£5	obverse	1998–
Mary Slessor	1848–1915	Scottish missionary to Nigeria and campaigner for women's rights	£10	both	1998–
Robert the Bruce	1274–1329	King of the Scots (1306–1329)	£20	obverse	1998–
Adam Smith	1723–1790	Economist and key figure of the Scottish Enlightenment	£50	both	1998–
Lord Kelvin	1824–1907	Mathematical physicist and engineer	£100	both	1998–
Alexander Fleming	1881–1955	Discoverer of penicillin	£5	obverse	2009–
William Arrol	1839–1913	Civil engineer, bridge builder, and Liberal Unionist Party politician	£5	obverse	2015– (commemorative)
Robert Burns	1759–1796	Notable Scottish poet	£10	obverse	2009–
Robert the Bruce	1274–1329	King of the Scots (1306–1329)	£20	obverse	2009–
Elsie Inglis	1864–1917	Doctor and suffragist	£50	obverse	2009–
Charles Rennie Mackintosh	1868–1928	Architect and designer	£100	obverse	2009–

=== Northern Ireland ===
Danske Bank
Person	Lifespan	Reason for honor	Denomination	Obverse or reverse	Years of circulation
John Boyd Dunlop	1840–1921	Founder of the Dunlop Pneumatic Tyre Company	£10	obverse	2005–
Harry Ferguson	1884–1960	Engineer and developer of the modern agricultural tractor, the Ferguson monoplane and the Ferguson P99	£20	obverse	2005–
Sir Samuel Cleland Davidson	1846–1921	founder of the Belfast Sirocco Works and pioneer of air conditioning	£50	obverse	2005–
Sir James Martin	1893–1981	Inventor of the aircraft ejector seat	£100	obverse	2005–
Ulster Bank
Person	Lifespan	Reason for honor	Denomination	Obverse or reverse	Years of circulation
George Best	1946–2005	Footballer, Northern Ireland and Manchester United (special commemorative issue)	£5	obverse	2006–

== United States of America ==
(United States) Currency: Dollar ($, 1792–Present)

Person	Lifespan	Reason for honor	Currency	Denomination	Obverse or reverse	Years of circulation
William Bradford	1590–1657	2nd Governor of Plymouth Colony (1621–1651)	Dollar	$10,000	reverse	1918–1928
William Brewster	1566–1644	leader and pastor of Plymouth Colony	Dollar	$10,000	reverse	1918–1928
John Carver	1576–1621	1st Governor of Plymouth Colony (1620–1621)	Dollar	$10,000	reverse	1918–1928
Salmon P. Chase	1808–1873	25th Secretary of the Treasury (1861–1864)	Dollar	$10,000	obverse	1918–1928
Salmon P. Chase	1808–1873	25th Secretary of the Treasury (1861–1864)	Dollar	$10,000	obverse	1929–1969
Grover Cleveland	1837–1908	22nd and 24th President of the United States (1885–1889 (22nd presidential term) and 1893–1897 (24th presidential term)	Dollar	$1,000	obverse	1929–1969
Hernando de Soto	1496/7-1542	Spanish explorer; first European explorer to find the Mississippi River (1542)	Dollar	$500	reverse	1918–1928
Elbridge Gerry	1744–1814	Delegate, Continental Congress (1782–1785); 4th Vice President of the United States (1813–1814)	Dollar	$5,000	reverse	1918–1928
Alexander Hamilton	1755/7-1804	1st Secretary of the Treasury (1789–1795)	Dollar	$1,000	obverse	1918–1928
Thomas Jefferson	1743–1826	Delegate, Continental Congress (1783–1784); 3rd President of the United States (1801–1809)	Dollar	$5,000	reverse	1918–1928
James Madison	1751–1836	Delegate, Continental Congress (1780–1783); 4th President of the United States (1809–1817)	Dollar	$5,000	reverse	1918–1928
James Madison	1751–1836	4th President of the United States (1809–1817)	Dollar	$5,000	obverse	1929–1969
John Marshall	1755–1835	4th Chief Justice of the Supreme Court (1801–1835)	Dollar	$500	obverse	1918–1928
William McKinley	1843–1901	25th President of the United States (1897–1901)	Dollar	$500	obverse	1929–1969
Thomas Mifflin	1744–1800	President of the United States in Congress Assembled (1783–1784)	Dollar	$5,000	reverse	1918–1928
James Monroe	1758–1831	Delegate, Continental Congress (1783–1786); 5th President of the United States (1817–1825)	Dollar	$5,000	reverse	1918–1928
John Robinson	1575–1625	organizer of the Mayflower voyage	Dollar	$10,000	reverse	1918–1928
Myles Standish	1584–1656	military commander of Plymouth Colony	Dollar	$10,000	reverse	1918–1928
George Washington	1732–1799	Commander-in-Chief of the Continental Army (1775–1783); 1st President of the United States (1789–1797)	Dollar	$5,000	reverse	1918–1928
John Adams	1735–1826	signatory, Declaration of Independence, 1776; 2nd President of the United States (1797–1801)	Dollar	$2	reverse	1976–
Samuel Adams	1722–1803	signatory, Declaration of Independence, 1776	Dollar	$2	reverse	1976–
Charles Carroll	1737–1832	signatory, Declaration of Independence, 1776	Dollar	$2	reverse	1976–
Samuel Chase	1741–1811	signatory, Declaration of Independence, 1776	Dollar	$2	reverse	1976–
Abraham Clark	1725–1794	signatory, Declaration of Independence, 1776	Dollar	$2	reverse	1976–
George Clinton	1739–1812	signatory, Declaration of Independence, 1776; 4th Vice President of the United States (1805–1812)	Dollar	$2	reverse	1976–
George Clymer	1739–1813	signatory, Declaration of Independence, 1776	Dollar	$2	reverse	1976–
John Dickinson	1732–1808	signatory, Declaration of Independence, 1776	Dollar	$2	reverse	1976–
William Ellery	1727–1820	signatory, Declaration of Independence, 1776	Dollar	$2	reverse	1976–
William Floyd	1734–1821	signatory, Declaration of Independence, 1776	Dollar	$2	reverse	1976–
Benjamin Franklin	1706–1790	signatory, Declaration of Independence, 1776	Dollar	$2	reverse	1976–
Benjamin Franklin	1706–1790	Founding Father	Dollar	$100	obverse	1996–
Elbridge Gerry	1744–1814	signatory, Declaration of Independence, 1776; 5th Vice President of the United States (1813–1814)	Dollar	$2	reverse	1976–
Ulysses S. Grant	1822–1885	18th President of the United States (1869–1877)	Dollar	$50	obverse	2004–
Alexander Hamilton	1755/7-1804	1st Secretary of the Treasury (1789–1795)	Dollar	$10	both	2006–
John Hancock	1737–1793	signatory, Declaration of Independence, 1776	Dollar	$2	reverse	1976–
Benjamin Harrison V	1726–1791	signatory, Declaration of Independence, 1776	Dollar	$2	reverse	1976–
Joseph Hewes	1730–1779	signatory, Declaration of Independence, 1776	Dollar	$2	reverse	1976–
Thomas Heyward, Jr.	1746–1809	signatory, Declaration of Independence, 1776	Dollar	$2	reverse	1976–
William Hooper	1742–1790	signatory, Declaration of Independence, 1776	Dollar	$2	reverse	1976–
Stephen Hopkins	1707–1785	signatory, Declaration of Independence, 1776	Dollar	$2	reverse	1976–
Francis Hopkinson	1737–1791	signatory, Declaration of Independence, 1776	Dollar	$2	reverse	1976–
Samuel Huntington	1731–1796	signatory, Declaration of Independence, 1776	Dollar	$2	reverse	1976–
Andrew Jackson	1767–1845	7th President of the United States (1829–1837)	Dollar	$20	obverse	2003–
Thomas Jefferson	1743–1826	3rd President of the United States (1801–1809); signatory, Declaration of Independence, 1776	Dollar	$2	both	1976–
Richard Henry Lee	1732–1794	signatory, Declaration of Independence, 1776	Dollar	$2	reverse	1976–
Francis Lewis	1713–1803	signatory, Declaration of Independence, 1776	Dollar	$2	reverse	1976–
Abraham Lincoln	1809–1865	16th President of the United States (1861–1865)	Dollar	$5	both	2008–
Philip Livingston	1716–1778	signatory, Declaration of Independence, 1776	Dollar	$2	reverse	1976–
Robert R. Livingston	1746–1813	Founding Father, Worked on writing the Declaration of Independence, 1776	Dollar	$2	reverse	1976–
Thomas McKean	1734–1817	signatory, Declaration of Independence, 1776	Dollar	$2	reverse	1976–
Arthur Middleton	1742–1787	signatory, Declaration of Independence, 1776	Dollar	$2	reverse	1976–
Lewis Morris	1726–1798	signatory, Declaration of Independence, 1776	Dollar	$2	reverse	1976–
Robert Morris	1734–1806	signatory, Declaration of Independence, 1776	Dollar	$2	reverse	1976–
William Paca	1740–1799	signatory, Declaration of Independence, 1776	Dollar	$2	reverse	1976–
Robert Treat Paine	1731–1814	signatory, Declaration of Independence, 1776	Dollar	$2	reverse	1976–
George Read	1733–1798	signatory, Declaration of Independence, 1776	Dollar	$2	reverse	1976–
Benjamin Rush	1745–1813	signatory, Declaration of Independence, 1776	Dollar	$2	reverse	1976–
Edward Rutledge	1749–1800	signatory, Declaration of Independence, 1776	Dollar	$2	reverse	1976–
Roger Sherman	1721–1793	signatory, Declaration of Independence, 1776	Dollar	$2	reverse	1976–
Richard Stockton	1730–1781	signatory, Declaration of Independence, 1776	Dollar	$2	reverse	1976–
Charles Thomson	1729–1824	signatory, Declaration of Independence, 1776	Dollar	$2	reverse	1976–
George Walton	1749/50-1804	signatory, Declaration of Independence, 1776	Dollar	$2	reverse	1976–
George Washington	1732–1799	1st President of the United States (1789–1797)	Dollar	$2	reverse	1976–
William Williams	1731–1811	signatory, Declaration of Independence, 1776	Dollar	$2	reverse	1976–
Thomas Willing	1731–1821	signatory, Declaration of Independence, 1776	Dollar	$2	reverse	1976–
James Wilson	1742–1798	signatory, Declaration of Independence, 1776	Dollar	$2	reverse	1976–
John Witherspoon	1723–1794	signatory, Declaration of Independence, 1776	Dollar	$2	reverse	1976–
Oliver Wolcott	1726–1797	signatory, Declaration of Independence, 1776	Dollar	$2	reverse	1976–

== Uruguay ==
(Uruguay) Currency: Peso Uruguayo (since 1993)
Symbol: $U

Person	Lifespan	Reason for honor	Denomination	Obverse or reverse	Years of circulation
Juan Zorrilla de San Martín	1855–1931	Writer, poet and ambassador	20 Pesos Uruguayos	Obverse	1994–
José Pedro Varela	1845–1879	Sociologist, journalist, politician, and educator	50 Pesos Uruguayos	Obverse	1994–
Eduardo Fabini	1882–1950	Composer and musician	100 Pesos Uruguayos	Obverse	1994–
Pedro Figari	1861–1938	Painter, lawyer, writer, and politician	200 Pesos Uruguayos	Obverse	1995–
Alfredo Vásquez Acevedo		Rector and politician	500 Pesos Uruguayos	Obverse	1994–
Juana de Ibarbourou	1892–1979	Poet	1,000 Pesos Uruguayos	Obverse	1995–
Dámaso Antonio Larrañaga	1771–1848	Priest, naturalist and botanist	2,000 Pesos Uruguayos	Obverse	2003–

== Uzbekistan ==
(Uzbekistan) Currency: Soum (since 1993)

Person	Lifespan	Reason for honor	Denomination	Obverse or reverse	Years of circulation
Timur (Tamerlane)	late 1320-1330s–1405	Founder of the Timurid Empire and the first ruler of the Timurid dynasty	500 soum	Reverse	1999–
Mirzo Ulugbek	1394–1449	Astronomer, mathematician and sultan	100,000 soum	Obverse	2019–

== Venezuela ==
(Venezuela) Currency: Venezuelan bolívar (1879–2008)
Venezuelan hard bolívar (Bs.F., 2007–2018)

Person	Lifespan	Reason for honour	Currency	Denomination	Obverse or reverse	Years of circulation
Francisco de Miranda	1750–1816	Military leader during the struggle for independence from Spain	Hard bolívar	Bs.F 2	obverse	2007–2013
Pedro Camejo	1790–1821	Soldier during the struggle for independence from Spain	Hard bolívar	Bs.F 5	obverse	2007–2014
Guaicaipuro	c1530-1568	Venezuelan indigenous leader against Spanish colonization	Hard bolívar	Bs.F 10	obverse	2007–2014
Luisa Cáceres de Arismendi	1799–1866	Heroine of the Venezuelan War of Independence	Hard bolívar	Bs.F 20	obverse	2007–2014
Simón Rodríguez	1769–1854	Philosopher and educator	Hard bolívar	Bs.F 50	obverse	2007–2015
Simón Bolívar	1783–1830	Military and political leader during the struggle for independence from Spain	Hard bolívar	Bs.F 100	obverse	2007–2015
Francisco de Miranda	1750–1816	Military leader during the struggle for independence from Spain	Hard bolívar	Bs.F 500	obverse	2016
Pedro Camejo	1790–1821	Soldier during the struggle for independence from Spain	Hard bolívar	Bs.F 1,000	obverse	2016–2018
Guaicaipuro	c1530-1568	Venezuelan indigenous leader against Spanish colonization	Hard bolívar	Bs.F 2,000	obverse	2016–2018
Luisa Cáceres de Arismendi	1799–1866	Heroine of the Venezuelan War of Independence	Hard bolívar	Bs.F 5,000	obverse	2016–2018
Simón Rodríguez	1769–1854	Philosopher and educator	Hard bolívar	Bs.F 10,000	obverse	2016–2018
Simón Bolívar	1783–1830	Military and political leader during the struggle for independence from Spain	Hard bolívar	Bs.F 20,000	obverse	2016–2018
Simón Bolívar	1783–1830	Military and political leader during the struggle for independence from Spain	Hard bolívar	Bs.F 100,000	obverse	2017–2018
Josefa Camejo	1791–1862	Heroine of the Venezuelan War of Independence	Venezuelan bolívar soberano	2 bolívares soberanos	Obverse	2018–
José Félix Ribas	1775–1815	Independence leader and hero of the Venezuelan War of Independence	Venezuelan bolívar soberano	5 bolívares soberanos	Obverse	2018–
Rafael Urdaneta	1788–1845	9th Venezuelan Minister of Defense (1839–1845); 4th President of Gran Colombia (1830–1831); 5th Colombian Minister of Defense (1828–1829); Venezuelan General and hero of the Spanish American wars of independence	Venezuelan bolívar soberano	10 bolívares soberanos	Obverse	2018–
Simón Rodríguez	1769–1854	Philosopher and educator	Venezuelan bolívar soberano	20 bolívares soberanos	Obverse	2018–
Antonio José de Sucre	1795–1830	2nd President of Bolivia (1825–1828); 4th President of Perú (June 23 – July 23, 1823)	Venezuelan bolívar soberano	50 bolívares soberanos	Obverse	2018–
Ezequiel Zamora	1817–1860	Venezuelan soldier, and leader of the Federalists in the Federal War (Guerra Federal) of 1859–1863	Venezuelan bolívar soberano	100 bolívares soberanos	Obverse	2018–
Sebastián Francisco de Miranda y Rodríguez de Espinoza	1750–1816	Supreme Chief of Venezuela (1812–1813)	Venezuelan bolívar soberano	200 bolívares soberanos	Obverse	2018–
Simón Bolívar	1783–1830	Military and political leader during the struggle for independence from Spain	Venezuelan bolívar soberano	500 bolívares soberanos	Obverse	2018–
Simón Bolívar	1783–1830	Military and political leader during the struggle for independence from Spain	Venezuelan bolívar soberano	10,000 bolívares soberanos	Obverse	2019–
Simón Bolívar	1783–1830	Military and political leader during the struggle for independence from Spain	Venezuelan bolívar soberano	20,000 bolívares soberanos	Obverse	2019–
Simón Bolívar	1783–1830	Military and political leader during the struggle for independence from Spain	Venezuelan bolívar soberano	50,000 bolívares soberanos	Obverse	2019–
Simón Bolívar	1783–1830	Military and political leader during the struggle for independence from Spain	Venezuelan bolívar soberano	200,000 bolívares soberanos	Obverse	2020–
Simón Bolívar	1783–1830	Military and political leader during the struggle for independence from Spain	Venezuelan bolívar soberano	500,000 bolívares soberanos	Obverse	2020–
Simón Bolívar	1783–1830	Military and political leader during the struggle for independence from Spain	Venezuelan bolívar soberano	1,000,000 bolívares soberanos	Obverse	2020–

== Vietnam ==
(Vietnam) Currency: Dong (since 1978)
Symbol: ₫

Person	Lifespan	Reason for honor	Denomination	Obverse or reverse	Years of circulation
Ho Chi Minh	1890–1969	Communist revolutionary leader, prime minister (1945–1955) and president (1945–1969) of the Democratic Republic of Vietnam	10,000 ₫	Obverse	2003–
Ho Chi Minh	1890–1969	Communist revolutionary leader, prime minister (1945–1955) and president (1945–1969) of the Democratic Republic of Vietnam	20,000 ₫	Obverse	2006–
Ho Chi Minh	1890–1969	Communist revolutionary leader, prime minister (1945–1955) and president (1945–1969) of the Democratic Republic of Vietnam	50,000 ₫	Obverse	2003–
Ho Chi Minh	1890–1969	Communist revolutionary leader, prime minister (1945–1955) and president (1945–1969) of the Democratic Republic of Vietnam	100,000 ₫	Obverse	2004–
Ho Chi Minh	1890–1969	Communist revolutionary leader, prime minister (1945–1955) and president (1945–1969) of the Democratic Republic of Vietnam	200,000 ₫	Obverse	2006–
Ho Chi Minh	1890–1969	Communist revolutionary leader, prime minister (1945–1955) and president (1945–1969) of the Democratic Republic of Vietnam	500,000 ₫	Obverse	2003–

== Weimar Republic and Nazi Germany ==
(Weimar Republic) and (Nazi Germany) Currency: Reichsmark (ℛℳ; 1924–1948)

Person	Lifespan	Reason for honour	Currency	Denomination	Obverse or reverse	Years of circulation
Albrecht Daniel Thaer	1752–1828	Agronomist and an avid supporter of the humus theory for plant nutrition	Reichsmark	10 ℛ︁ℳ︁	Obverse	1929–1948
Werner von Siemens	1816–1892	Inventor and industrialist; his name has been adopted as the SI unit of electrical conductance, the siemens. He was also the founder of the electrical and telecommunications company Siemens	Reichsmark	20 ℛ︁ℳ︁	Obverse	1929–1948
David Justus Ludwig Hansemann	1790–1864	Prussian Minister of Finance (1848)	Reichsmark	50 ℛ︁ℳ︁	Obverse	1933–1948
Justus Freiherr von Liebig	1803–1873	Chemist who made major contributions to agricultural and biological chemistry, and was considered the founder of organic chemistry; As a professor at the University of Giessen, he devised the modern laboratory-oriented teaching method, and for such innovations, he is regarded one of the greatest chemistry teachers of all time; He has been described as the "father of the fertilizer industry" for his emphasis on nitrogen and trace minerals as essential plant nutrients, and his formulation of the Law of the Minimum which described how plant growth relied on the scarcest nutrient resource (limiting factor), rather than the total amount of resources available	Reichsmark	100 ℛ︁ℳ︁	Obverse	1935–1948
Karl Friedrich Schinkel	1781–1841	Architect, city planner, and painter	Reichsmark	1,000 ℛ︁ℳ︁	Obverse	1936–1948

== Yugoslavia ==
(Kingdom of Yugoslavia) Currency: Dinar (pl. Dinara; din. and дин.; 1918–WWII)

Person	Lifespan	Reason for honour	Currency	Denomination	Obverse or reverse	Years of circulation
Peter II Karađorđević	1923–1970	King of Yugoslavia (1934–1945)	1929–1939 Dinar	10 din, 20 din, 500 din, and 10,000 din,	Obverse	1939 (10 din,), 1936 (20 din,), 1935 (500 din,), 1936 (10,000 din,)
Alexander I	1888–1934	King of Yugoslavia (1929–1934)	1929–1939 Dinar	50 din,	Obverse	1931
Queen Maria	1900–1961	Queen consort of Serbs, Croats and Slovenes (1922–1929); Queen of Yugoslavia (1929–1934)	1929–1939 Dinar	1,000 din,	Obverse	1931–1935

(Socialist Federal Republic of Yugoslavia) Currency: Dinar (pl. Dinara; din. and дин.; WWII–1991)

Person	Lifespan	Reason for honour	Currency	Denomination	Obverse or reverse	Years of circulation
Milivoje Rodić		Partisan; colonel of the Yugoslav army	1944 Dinar	All (1-1,000 din,)	Obverse	1944 (1-1,000 din,)
Milivoje Rodić		Partisan; colonel of the Yugoslav army	1946 Dinar	500 din,	Obverse	1946
Arif Heralić	1922–1971	Blast furnace worker	1955 Dinar	1,000 din,	Obverse	1955–1963
Arif Heralić	1922–1971	Blast furnace worker	1966 Dinar	10 din,	Obverse	1965–1981
Nikola Tesla	1856–1943	Serbian-American electrical engineer and inventor	1966 Dinar	500 din,	Obverse	1970–1986
Alija Sirotanović	1914–1990	Miner; recipient of the Order of the Hero of Socialist Labour	1985 Dinar	20,000 din,	Obverse	1987
Josip Broz Tito	1892–1980	Leader of the Partisans; 4th President of the League of Communists of Yugoslavia (1939–1980); 1st Federal Secretary of National Defense (1945–1953); 1st Secretary-General of the Non-Aligned Movement (1961–1964); 23rd Prime Minister of Yugoslavia (1944–1963); 1st President of Yugoslavia (1953–1980)	1985–1990 Dinar	5,000 din, 100 din, 500 din, and 1,000 din,	Obverse	1985 (5,000 din,); was considered for issue in 1990 (100 din, 500 din, and 1,000 din,)

== FR Yugoslavia ==
(Federal Republic of Yugoslavia) Currency: Dinar (pl. Dinara; din. and дин.; 1992–2003)

Person	Lifespan	Reason for honour	Currency	Denomination	Obverse or reverse	Years of circulation
Nikola Tesla	1856–1943	Serbian-American electrical engineer and inventor	1992 Dinar	1,000, 5,000,000 din, and 10,000,000,000 din,	Obverse	1990–1991 (1,000 din,); 1993 (5,000,000 din,); 1993 (10,000,000,000 din,)
Ivo Andrić	1892–1975	Novelist, poet and short story writer; recipient of the 1961 Nobel Prize in Literature	1990–1992 Dinar	5,000 din, and 10,000,000 din,	Obverse	1991–1992 (5,000 din,); 1993 (10,000,000 din,)
Nikola Tesla	1856–1943	Serbian-American electrical engineer and inventor	1993 Dinar	5,000 din,	Obverse	1993
Vuk Stefanović Karadžić	1787–1864	Philologist and linguist; reformer of the Serbian language	1993 Dinar	10,000 din,	Obverse	1993
Petar II Petrović-Njegoš	1813–1851	Prince-Bishop of Montenegro	1993 Dinar	50,000 din,	Obverse	1993
Dimitrije "Dositej" Obradović	1739–1811	Writer, philosopher, dramatist, librettist, linguist, traveler, polyglot and the first minister of education of Serbia	1993 Dinar	500,000 din,	Obverse	1993
Đorđe Petrović (Karađorđe)	1768–1817	Grand Vožd of Serbia (1804–1813); President of the Administering Council (1811–1813)	1993 Dinar	5,000,000 din,	Obverse	1993
Mihajlo Idvorski Pupin (Michael I. Pupin)	1858–1935	Physicist and physical chemist	1993 Dinar	50,000,000 din,	Obverse	1993
Jovan Cvijić	1865–1927	Geographer and ethnologist	1993 Dinar	500,000,000 din,	Obverse	1993
Georgije "Đura" Jakšić	1832–1878	Poet, painter, writer, dramatist, bohemian and patriot	1993 Dinar	5,000,000,000 din,	Obverse	1993
Miloš Obrenović	1780–1860	Prince of Serbia (1815–1839; 1858–1860)	1993 Dinar	50,000,000,000 din,	Obverse	1993
Jovan Jovanović Zmaj	1833–1904	Poet	1993 Dinar	500,000,000,000 din,	Obverse	1993
Josif Pančić	1814–1888	Botanist	1994 Dinar	10 din,	Obverse	1994
Nikola Tesla	1856–1943	Serbian-American electrical engineer and inventor	1994 Dinar	100 din,	Obverse	1994
Petar II Petrović-Njegoš	1813–1851	Prince-Bishop of Montenegro	1994 Dinar	1,000 din,	Obverse	1994
Dimitrije "Dositej" Obradović	1739–1811	Writer, philosopher, dramatist, librettist, linguist, traveler, polyglot and the first minister of education of Serbia	1994 Dinar	5,000 din,	Obverse	1994
Đorđe Petrović (Karađorđe)	1768–1817	Grand Vožd of Serbia (1804–1813); President of the Administering Council (1811–1813)	1994 Dinar	50,000 din,	Obverse	1994
Jovan Cvijić	1865–1927	Geographer and ethnologist	1994 Dinar	500,000 din,	Obverse	1994
Ivo Andrić	1892–1975	Novelist, poet and short story writer; recipient of the 1961 Nobel Prize in Literature	1994 Dinar	10,000,000 din,	Obverse	1994
Josif Pančić	1814–1888	Botanist	New Dinar	1 new dinar	Obverse	1994
Nikola Tesla	1856–1943	Serbian-American electrical engineer and inventor	New Dinar	5 new dinars	Obverse	1994
Petar II Petrović-Njegoš	1813–1851	Prince-Bishop of Montenegro	New Dinar	10 new dinars	Obverse	1994
Georgije "Đura" Jakšić	1832–1878	Poet, painter, writer, dramatist, bohemian and patriot	New Dinar	20 new dinars	Obverse	1994
Miloš Obrenović	1780–1860	Prince of Serbia (1815–1839; 1858–1860)	New Dinar	50 new dinars	Obverse	1996
Dimitrije "Dositej" Obradović	1739–1811	Writer, philosopher, dramatist, librettist, linguist, traveler, polyglot and the first minister of education of Serbia	New Dinar	100 new dinars	Obverse	1996
Vuk Stefanović Karadžić	1787–1864	Philologist and linguist; reformer of the Serbian language	Dinar	10 din,	Both	2000–2003 (up to 2006 on Serbian dinar)
Petar II Petrović-Njegoš	1813–1851	Prince-Bishop of Montenegro	Dinar	20 din,	Both	2000–2003 (up to 2006 on Serbian dinar)
Stevan Stojanović	1856–1914	Composer and music educator	Dinar	50 din,	Both	2000–2003 (up to 2006 on Serbian dinar)
Nikola Tesla	1856–1943	Serbian-American electrical engineer and inventor	Dinar	100 din,	Both	2000–2003 (up to 2006 on Serbian dinar)
Nadežda Petrović	1873–1915	Painter	Dinar	200 din,	Both	2001–2003 (up to 2006 on Serbian dinar)
Đorđe Vajfert	1850–1937	3rd Governor of the National Bank of the Kingdom of Serbia (1890–1892); 5th Governor of the National Bank of the Kingdom of Yugoslavia (1912–1926)	Dinar	1,000 din,	Both	2001–2003 (up to 2006 on Serbian dinar)
Slobodan Jovanović	1869–1958	19th Prime Minister of Yugoslavia (1942–1943)	Dinar	5,000 din,	Both	2002–2003 (up to 2006 on Serbian dinar)

== Zaire ==
Currency: Zaire (Z; 1967–1997)

Person	Lifespan	Reason for honour	Currency	Denomination	Obverse or reverse	Years of circulation
Mobutu Sese Seko (b. Joseph-Desiré Mobutu)	1930–1997	President of Zaire (1967–1997)	Makuta/Zaire	All (50 makuta/5,000,000 zaires)	Obverse	1972–1993
Mobutu Sese Seko (b. Joseph-Desiré Mobutu)	1930–1997	President of Zaire (1967–1997)	New Likuta/New Makuta/New Zaire	All (1 new likuta/1,000,000 new zaires)	Obverse	1993–1996

== Zambia ==
(Zambia) Currency: Kwacha (since 1968)
Symbol: ZK

Person	Lifespan	Reason for honor	Denomination	Obverse or reverse	Years of circulation
Kenneth Kaunda	1924–2021	1st President of Zambia (1964–1991)	50 kwacha	Reverse	2014– (commemorative)
Frederick Chiluba	1943–2011	2nd President of Zambia (1991–2002)	50 kwacha	Reverse	2014– (commemorative)
Levy Mwanawasa	1948–2008	3rd President of Zambia (2002–2008)	50 kwacha	Reverse	2014– (commemorative)
Rupiah Banda	1937–2022	4th President of Zambia (2008–2011)	50 kwacha	Reverse	2014– (commemorative)
Michael Sata	1937–2014	5th President of Zambia (2011–2014)	50 kwacha	Reverse	2014– (commemorative)
