= Mallow =

Mallow or mallows may refer to:

== Nature ==
- Malvaceae, a family of plants; in particular the following genera:
  - Abelmoschus, a genus of about fifteen species of flowering plants
  - Althaea (plant), marsh mallow
  - Callirhoe (plant), poppy mallow
  - Corchorus, mallow, molokia, mlukhia
  - Eremalche, flowering plants endemic to the US desert southwest
  - Hibiscus, rosemallow
  - Kosteletzkya, seashore mallow
  - Lavatera, tree mallow or rose mallow
  - Malacothamnus, bush-mallow
  - Malva, mallow
  - Malvaviscus, Turk's cap mallow, wax mallow
  - Sidalcea, Greek mallow, chequer-mallow
  - Sphaeralcea, globemallow
- Insects:
  - Larentia clavaria, mallow, species of moth
  - Mallow skipper, butterfly

== Places ==
- Mallow, Alberta, a locality in Alberta, Canada
- Mallow, County Cork, a town in the Republic of Ireland
  - Mallow (Parliament of Ireland constituency), 1613–1800
  - Mallow (UK Parliament constituency), 1801–1885
  - Mallow GAA, a Gaelic football and hurling club
  - Mallow railway station
- Mallow, Iran, a village in Razavi Khorasan Province, Iran
- Mallow, Virginia, United States
- Mallows Bay, Maryland, United States
- The Mallows, a historic home located at Head of the Harbor in Suffolk County, New York

== People ==
- Dave Mallow (1948–2025), U.S. voice actor, also known as Colin Phillips
- Johannes Mallow (born 1981), German memory-sports competitor
- Charles Edward Mallows (1864–1915), English architect and landscape architect
- Colin Lingwood Mallows (1930–2023), English statistician
- Phil Mallow (born 1957), American politician

== Arts, entertainment, and media ==
=== Fictional characters ===
- Mallow, cook and one of the Trial Captains of Akala Island in Pokémon Sun & Moon
- Hober Mallow, character in the Foundation series of novels of Isaac Asimov
- Mallow (Super Mario RPG), a playable cloud-like character in Super Mario RPG, a 1996 role-playing video game
- Mallow, a character from Oggy Oggy

=== Other uses in arts, entertainment, and media ===
- Mallows, a toy line by Shocker Toys
- "Rakes of Mallow", a traditional Irish song and polka

== Transportation ==
- Beriev Be-10, Soviet jet-engined flying boat (NATO reporting name "Mallow")
- HMS Mallow
- HMS Mallow (1915) (later HMAS Mallow), sloop launched in 1915
- HMS Mallow (K81), corvette from World War II

== Other uses ==
- Mauve (also known as mallow), a color
- Mallows's C_{p}, in statistics, a stopping rule for stepwise regression
- Malvi language, or Mallow, the language of the Malwa region of India
- Marshmallow, a sweet originally made from the marsh mallow

== See also ==
- Mallo (disambiguation)
- Mallos (disambiguation)
- Malov, a surname
- Malloué, a commune in Calvados department, France
