= Kyrgyz som =

Currency of Kyrgyzstan

Кыргыз сому (Kyrgyz)
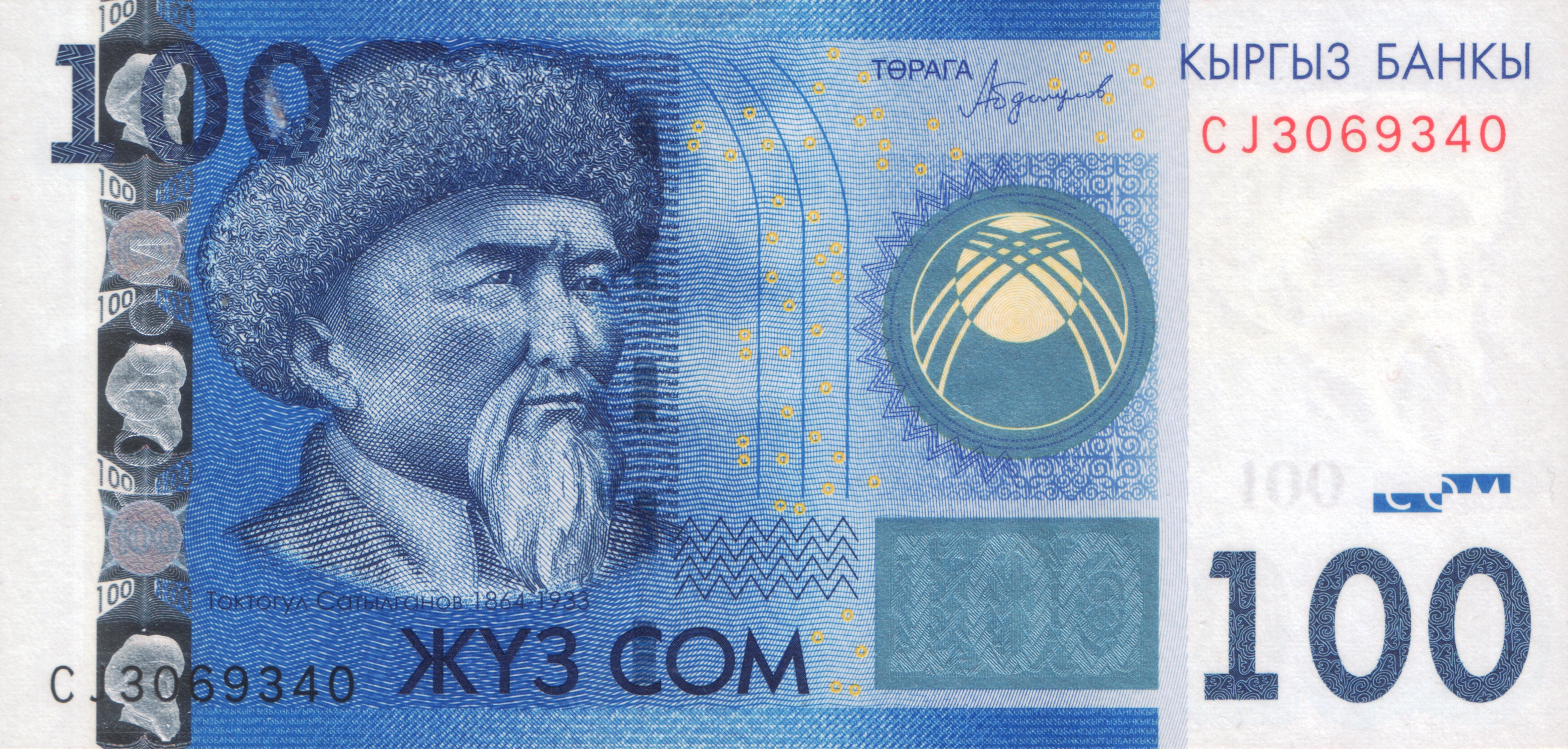
- 100 som note (2016)

ISO 4217
- Code: KGS (numeric: 417)
- Subunit: 0.01

Units of account
- Base unit: сом (Cyrillic) / som (Latin)
- Plural: The language(s) of this currency do(es) not have a morphological plural distinction.
- Symbol: ⃀
- Subunit
- 1/100: tyiyn

Denominations
- Banknotes
- Freq. used: 20, 50, 100, 200, 500, 1,000, 5,000 som
- Rarely used: 1, 10, 50 tyiyn, 1, 5, 10, 2,000 som
- Coins
- Freq. used: 1, 3, 5, 10 som
- Rarely used: 1, 10, 50 tyiyn

Demographics
- Date of introduction: 10 May 1993
- Replaced: Russian ruble
- User(s): Kyrgyzstan

Issuance
- Central bank: National Bank of the Kyrgyz Republic
- Website: www.nbkr.kg

Valuation
- Inflation: 7.3% (December 2023)
- Source: www.nbkr.kg

The som (/sɒm/; Kyrgyz: сом [sɔm]; ISO code: KGS; sign: ⃀ (^{с})) is the currency of Kyrgyzstan.

== Etymology ==
The official name of the Soviet ruble in Kazakh, Kyrgyz, Tajik, and Uzbek was soum, and this name appeared written on the back of banknotes, among the texts for the value of the note in all 15 official languages of the USSR. The word som (alternatively transliterated "soum" or "sum") means "pure" in Kazakh, Kyrgyz, Uyghur and Uzbek, as well as in many other Turkic languages. The word implies "pure" silver or gold and thus is similar in etymology to sterling.

=== Currency symbol ===
Currency symbol

The National Bank of the Kyrgyz Republic approved an underlined С (es) as the official currency symbol for the som in February 2017. It is represented in Unicode as U+20C0 ⃀ SOM SIGN.

== History ==
After the collapse of the Soviet Union attempts were made by most republics to maintain a common currency. Certain politicians were hoping to at the very least maintain "special relations" among former Soviet republics, or the "near abroad". Another reason were the economic considerations for maintaining the rouble zone. The wish to preserve the strong trade relations between former Soviet republics was considered the most important goal.

The break-up of the Soviet Union was not accompanied by any formal changes in monetary arrangements. The Central Bank of Russia was authorized to take over the State Bank of the USSR (Gosbank) on 1 January 1992. It continued to ship Soviet notes and coins to the central banks of the fourteen newly independent countries, which had formerly been the main branches of Gosbank in the republics. The political situation, however, was not favourable for maintaining a common currency. Maintaining a common currency requires a strong political consensus in respect to monetary and fiscal targets, a common institution in charge of implementing these targets, and some minimum of common legislation (concerning the banking and foreign exchange regulations). These conditions were far from being met amidst the turbulent economic and political situation.

During the first half of 1992, a monetary union with 15 independent states all using the rouble existed. Since it was clear that the situation would not last, each of them was using its position as "free-riders" to issue huge amounts of money in the form of credit. As a result, some countries were issuing coupons in order to "protect" their markets from buyers from other states. The Russian central bank responded in July 1992 by setting up restrictions to the flow of credit between Russia and other states. The final collapse of the rouble zone began when Russia pulled out with the exchange of banknotes by the Central Bank of Russia on Russian territory at the end of July 1993.

The Kyrgyz som was introduced on 10 May 1993, replacing the Russian ruble which itself replaced the Soviet ruble at a rate of 1 som = RUR 200. Initially only banknotes were issued, coins were not introduced until 2008.

== Coins ==
Circulation coins were first introduced in January 2008, making Kyrgyzstan second to last of the former Soviet republics to issue them. Belarus became the last. This move came with growing demand from vendors for coins, especially from slot machine industries and those desiring a more efficient system for collecting fare money.

The coins were issued in denominations of 10 and 50 tıyın and 1, 3, and 5 som. A 10 som coin was issued a year later in 2009.

All coins are minted by the Kazakhstan mint in Ust-Kamenogorsk and bear some resemblance to coins of the Russian Federation.

Coins of the som (2008–present)
Image	Value	Technical parameters			Description			Date of			
Image	Value	Diameter	Mass	Composition	Edge	Obverse	Reverse	minting	issue	withdrawal	lapse
	1 tıyın	14 mm	1.0 g	Brass-plated steel	Milled	flower (гүл/ gul)	Emblem of Kyrgyzstan, country name, year	2008	1 January 2008	Current, but not issued for general circulation	
	10 tıyın	15 mm	1.3 g	Brass-plated steel	Milled	flower (гүл/ gul)	Emblem of Kyrgyzstan, country name, year	2008	1 January 2008	Current	
	50 tıyın	17 mm	1.8 g	Brass-plated steel	Milled	flower (гүл/ gul)	Emblem of Kyrgyzstan, country name, year	2008	1 January 2008	Current	
	1 som	19 mm	2.5g	Nickel-plated steel	Milled	leather bottle, the "kookor" with symbol of a "tumar" represented by a triangle.	Emblem of Kyrgyzstan, country name, year	2008	1 January 2008	Current	
	3 som	21 mm	3.2 g	Nickel-plated steel	Milled	leather bottle, the "kookor" with symbol of a "tumar" represented by a triangle.	Emblem of Kyrgyzstan, country name, year	2008	1 January 2008	Current	
	5 som	23 mm	4.2 g	Nickel-plated steel	Milled	leather bottle, the "kookor" with symbol of a "tumar" represented by a triangle.	Emblem of Kyrgyzstan, country name, year	2008	1 January 2008	Current	
	10 som	24.5 mm	5.4 g	Nickel-plated steel	Milled	leather bottle, the "kookor" with symbol of a "tumar" represented by a triangle.	Emblem of Kyrgyzstan, country name, year	2009	1 December 2009	Current	
	10 som	24.5 mm	5.4 g	Nickel-plated steel	Lettering "Он сом", five-pointed star, «10 СОМ»	leather bottle, the "kookor" with symbol of a "tumar" represented by a triangle.	Emblem of Kyrgyzstan, country name, year	2009	1 September 2014	Current	
These images are to scale at 2.5 pixels per millimetre. For table standards, see the coin specification table.

=== Commemorative coins ===
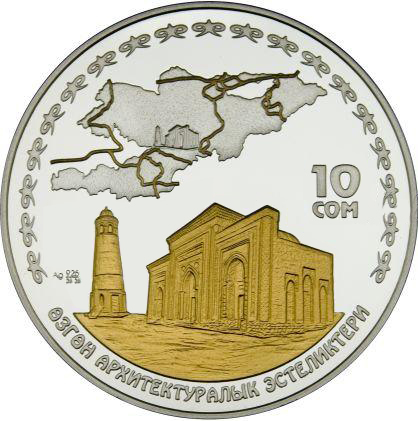
10 som (2007)

There are several commemorative non circulation coins struck in silver and gold, and a special collector's 1 tıyın piece struck in brass. Starting in 1995, the National Bank of the Kyrgyz Republic has issued a large number of commemorative coins intended for collectors. They are not used in everyday circulation.

== Banknotes ==
On 10 May 1993, the government issued 1, 10, and 50 tıyın notes and the Kyrgyzstan Bank issued notes for 1, 5, and 20 som. In 1994, the Kyrgyz Bank issued a second series of notes in denominations of 1, 5, 10, 20, 50, and 100 som. A third series followed from 1997 onwards in denominations of 1, 5, 10, 20, 50, 100, 200, 500, and 1,000 som. A fourth series was issued in 2009 and 2010 in denominations of 20, 50, 100, 200, 500, 1,000, and 5,000 som. Several commemorative banknotes intended for collectors were also issued.

=== First series (1993) ===
Notes valued 1 and 10 tıyın with serial numbers KT and ZT were issued in 1999. 50 tıyıns notes with serial numbers KT and ZT were issued in 2001. All others in 1993.

Notes of the first series were designed by Dmitry Lysogorov and A. P. Tsygank. They were printed by De La Rue in Great Britain.

Notes valued 1, 10, and 50 tıyın stayed in use until coins were introduced in January 2008. Banknotes of 1, 5, and 20 som of the first series were gradually withdrawn from circulation and replaced with banknotes of the second series starting in 1994.

First series (1993)
Image		Value	Dimensions	Description			Date of			
Obverse	Reverse	Value	Dimensions	Obverse	Reverse	Watermark	Printing	Issue	Withdrawal	Lapse
		1 tıyın	90×70 mm	Value, Kyrgyz eagle	Value, Emblem of Kyrgyzstan	Repeating eagle (1993 issue). Mushroom shaped ornament (1999 and 2001 issue).	No date	10 May 1993	Current, but no longer issued and rarely seen in circulation.	
		10 tıyın	90×70 mm	Value, Kyrgyz eagle	Value, Emblem of Kyrgyzstan	Repeating eagle (1993 issue). Mushroom shaped ornament (1999 and 2001 issue).	No date	10 May 1993	Current, but no longer issued and rarely seen in circulation.	
		50 tıyın	90×70 mm	Value, Kyrgyz eagle	Value, Emblem of Kyrgyzstan	Repeating eagle (1993 issue). Mushroom shaped ornament (1999 and 2001 issue).	No date	10 May 1993	Current, but no longer issued and rarely seen in circulation.	
		1 som	140×70 mm	Value, Manas	Value, Manas Ordo	Repeating eagle	No date	10 May 1993	Current, but no longer issued and rarely seen in circulation.	
		5 som	140×70 mm	Value, Manas	Value, Manas Ordo	Repeating eagle	No date	10 May 1993	Current, but no longer issued and rarely seen in circulation.	
		20 som	140×70 mm	Value, Manas	Value, Manas Ordo	Repeating eagle	No date	10 May 1993	Current, but no longer issued and rarely seen in circulation.	
These images are to scale at 0.7 pixel per millimetre (18 pixel per inch). For table standards, see the banknote specification table.

=== Second series (1994–1995) ===
The second series of banknotes followed in 1994-1995 when "the banknotes of the stabilization period" were issued. These banknotes had a better counterfeit protection than the banknotes of the first series.

Second series (1994–1995)
Image		Value	Dimensions	Description			Date of			
Obverse	Reverse	Value	Dimensions	Obverse	Reverse	Watermark	printing	issue	withdrawal	lapse
		1 som	135 х 65 mm	Abdylas Maldybaev	Komuz, kylkyak, Bishkek Philharmonic Orchestra	Toktogul Satylganov	No date	11 April 1994	Current, but no longer issued and rarely seen in circulation.	
		5 som	135 х 65 mm	Bubusara Beyshenalieva	Kyrgyz National Opera	Toktogul Satylganov	No date	11 April 1994	Current, but no longer issued and rarely seen in circulation.	
		10 som	135 х 65 mm	Kasym Tynystanov	Mountain ranges of Kyrgyzstan and the Dzhety-Oguz tract	Toktogul Satylganov	No date	28 January 1994	Current, but no longer issued and rarely seen in circulation.	
		20 som	135 х 65 mm	Togolok Moldo	Manas Mausoleum	Toktogul Satylganov	No date	11 April 1994	Current, but no longer issued and rarely seen in circulation.	
		50 som	135 х 65 mm	Kurmanjan Datka	Uzgen architectural complex of the 11-12th centuries	Toktogul Satylganov	No date	29 August 1994	Current, but no longer issued and rarely seen in circulation.	
		100 som	135 х 65 mm	Toktogul Satylganov	Toktogul Hydroelectric Power Station	Toktogul Satylganov	No date	20 March 1995	Current, but no longer issued and rarely seen in circulation.	
These images are to scale at 0.7 pixel per millimetre (18 pixel per inch). For table standards, see the banknote specification table.

=== Third series (1997–2005) ===
Starting in 1997, a new series of banknotes was introduced with similar themes, but enhanced design, compared to the previous series.

In January 2008 coins of 1 and 5 som and in December 2009 coins of 10 som were introduced. As a result, production of banknotes of these values ceased. The banknotes were however not removed from circulation, but are instead being phased out. In January 2008 the Kyrgyz National Bank estimated that within 2 years the 1 and 5 som banknotes would have almost completely disappeared from circulation.

Third series (1997–2005)
Image		Value	Dimensions	Description			Date of			
Obverse	Reverse	Value	Dimensions	Obverse	Reverse	Watermark	printing	issue	withdrawal	lapse
		1 som	120 × 60 mm	Abdylas Maldybaev	Komuz, kylkyak, Bishkek Philharmonic Orchestra	As portrait	1999	7 February 2000	Current. But no longer issued.	
		5 som	135 х 65 mm	Bubusara Beyshenalieva	Kyrgyz National Opera	As portrait	1997	17 December 1997	Current. But no longer issued.	
		10 som	135 х 65 mm	Kasym Tynystanov	Mountain ranges of Kyrgyzstan and the Dzhety-Oguz tract	As portrait	1997	17 December 1997	Current. But no longer issued.	
		20 som	135 х 65 mm	Togolok Moldo	Manas Mausoleum	As portrait, and value	2002	15 August 2002	Current. But no longer issued.	
		50 som	145 × 70 mm	Kurmanjan Datka	Uzgen architectural complex of the 11-12th centuries	As portrait, and value	2002	15 August 2002	Current. But no longer issued.	
		100 som	150 × 72 mm	Toktogul Satylganov	Khan Tengri	As portrait, and value	2002	15 August 2002	Current. But no longer issued.	
		200 som	155 × 74 mm	Alykul Osmonov	Lake Issyk Kul	As portrait, and value	2000	28 August 2000	Current. But no longer issued.	
		200 som	155 × 74 mm	Alykul Osmonov	Lake Issyk Kul	As portrait, and value	2004	2 August 2004	Current. But no longer issued.	
		500 som	160 × 76 mm	Sayakbay Karalaev	Sayakbay Karalaev and images from the Manas (epic)	As portrait, and value	2000	28 August 2000	Current. But no longer issued.	
		500 som	160 × 76 mm	Sayakbay Karalaev	Sayakbay Karalaev and images from the Manas (epic)	As portrait, and value	2005	1 November 2005	Current. But no longer issued.	
		1,000 som	165 × 78 mm	Jusup Balasagyn	Takhti Sulaiman, Mount Sulaiman	As portrait, and value	2000	28 August 2000	Current. But no longer issued.	
These images are to scale at 0.7 pixel per millimetre (18 pixel per inch). For table standards, see the banknote specification table.

=== Fourth series (2009–2016) ===
In 2009 the National Bank of the Kyrgyz Republic issued a 5,000 som note. Later new editions for 20, 50, and 100 som denominations followed. Among other things, these notes have enhanced security features compared to the previous series.

Fourth series (2009–2016)
Image		Value	Dimensions	Description			Date of			
Obverse	Reverse	Value	Dimensions	Obverse	Reverse	Watermark	Printing	Issue	Withdrawal	Lapse
		20 som	120 × 58 mm	Togolok Moldo	Tash Rabat	As portrait	2009	1 July 2009	current	
		20 som	120 × 58 mm	Togolok Moldo	Tash Rabat	As portrait	2016	20 December 2018	current	
		50 som	126 × 61 mm	Kurmanjan Datka	Minaret and mausoleum	As portrait	2009	1 July 2009	current	
		50 som	126 × 61 mm	Kurmanjan Datka	Minaret and mausoleum	As portrait	2016	1 March 2017	current	
		100 som	132 × 63 mm	Toktogul Satylganov	Toktogul Hydroelectric Power Station	As portrait	2009	1 July 2009	current	
		100 som	132 × 63 mm	Toktogul Satylganov	Toktogul Hydroelectric Power Station	As portrait	2016	1 March 2017	current	
		200 som	138 × 66 mm	Alykul Osmonov	Lake Issyk-Kul	As portrait	2010	1 December 2010	current	
		200 som	138 × 66 mm	Alykul Osmonov	Lake Issyk-Kul	As portrait	2016	1 January 2017	current	
		500 som	144 × 68 mm	Sayakbay Karalaev	Manas Mausoleum	As portrait	2010	1 December 2010	current	
		500 som	144 × 68 mm	Sayakbay Karalaev	Manas Mausoleum	As portrait	2016	1 January 2017	current	
		1,000 som	150 × 71 mm	Jusup Balasagyn	Takhti Sulaiman, Mount Sulaiman	As portrait	2010	1 December 2010	current	
		1,000 som	150 × 71 mm	Jusup Balasagyn	Takhti Sulaiman, Mount Sulaiman	As portrait	2016	1 January 2017	current	
		5,000 som	156 × 73 mm	Suimenkul Chokmorov	Ala-Too Square	As portrait	2009	2 March 2009	current	
		5,000 som	156 × 73 mm	Suimenkul Chokmorov	Ala-Too Square	As portrait	2016	20 December 2018	current	
These images are to scale at 0.7 pixel per millimetre (18 pixel per inch). For table standards, see the banknote specification table.

=== Fifth series (2023) ===
Fifth series (2023)
Image		Value	Dimensions	Description			Date of			
Obverse	Reverse	Value	Dimensions	Obverse	Reverse	Watermark	Printing	Issue	Withdrawal	Lapse
		20 som	120 × 58 mm	Togolok Moldo	Tash Rabat	Togolok Moldo	2023	15 February 2024	current	
		50 som	126 × 61 mm	Kurmanjan Datka	Minaret and mausoleum	Kurmanjan Datka	2023	15 February 2024	current	
		100 som	132 × 63 mm	Toktogul Satylganov	Toktogul Dam	Toktogul Satylganov	2023	15 February 2024	current	
		200 som	138 × 66 mm	Alykul Osmonov	Lake Issyk-Kul	Alykul Osmonov	2023	10 May 2023	current	
		500 som	144 × 68 mm	Sayakbay Karalaev	Manas Mausoleum	Sayakbay Karalaev	2023	10 May 2023	current	
		1,000 som	150 × 71 mm	Jusup Balasagyn	Takhti Sulaiman	Jusup Balasagyn	2023	10 May 2023	current	
		5,000 som	156 x 73 mm	Suimenkul Chokmorov	Ala-Too	Suimenkul Chokmorov	2023	10 May 2024	current	

=== Sixth series (2026) ===
Image		Value	Dimensions	Description			Date of			
Obverse	Reverse	Value	Dimensions	Obverse	Reverse	Watermark	Printing	Issue	Withdrawal	Lapse
		20 som	120 × 58 mm	Togolok Moldo	Tash Rabat	Togolok Moldo	2026	27 October 2026	current	
		50 som	126 × 61 mm	Kurmanjan Datka	Minaret and mausoleum	Kurmanjan Datka	2026	27 October 2026	current	

==== Commemorative banknotes ====
In October 2014 banknotes commemorating the 150th birthdate of Toktogul Satylganov and the 100th birthdate of Alykul Osmonov were issued for sale to collectors. Only 3,000 of each were printed.

A commemorative 2,000 som banknote in honor of the 25th anniversary of independence and the introduction of the som was issued in November 2017.

Commemorative banknotes
Image		Value	Dimensions	Description			Date of			
Obverse	Reverse	Value	Dimensions	Obverse	Reverse	Watermark	Printing	Issue	Withdrawal	Lapse
		100 som	132 × 63 mm	Toktogul Satylganov	Toktogul Hydroelectric Power Station	Toktogul Satylganov	2009	20 October 2014	current	
		200 som	138 × 66 mm	Alykul Osmonov	Lake Issyk-Kul	Alykul Osmonov	2009	20 October 2014	current	
		2,000 som	156 × 73 mm	Monument of Manas, a stylised yurt, symbol of "Umai Ene" in the background	Stylised tree, Khan Tengri mountain, eagle flying over lake Issyk-Kul	Toktogul Satylganov	2017	17 November 2017	current	
These images are to scale at 0.7 pixel per millimetre (18 pixel per inch). For table standards, see the banknote specification table.

== Exchange rates ==
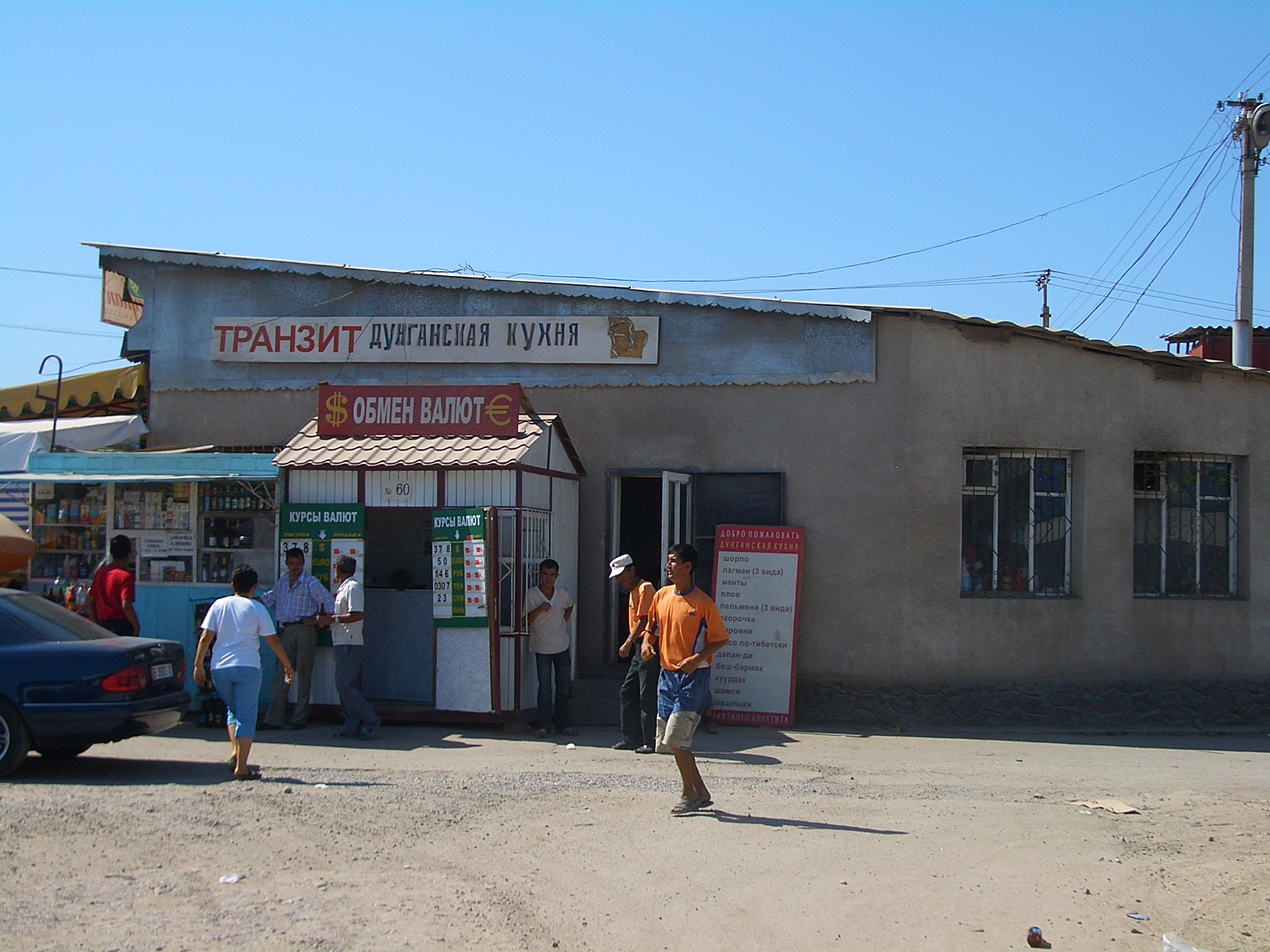
One of many currency exchange kiosks in Bishkek's Dordoy Bazaar, quoting value of foreign currencies in Kyrgyz som

Current KGS exchange rates
From Google Finance:	AUD CAD CHF CNY EUR GBP HKD JPY USD KZT
From Yahoo! Finance:	AUD CAD CHF CNY EUR GBP HKD JPY USD KZT
From XE.com:	AUD CAD CHF CNY EUR GBP HKD JPY USD KZT
From OANDA:	AUD CAD CHF CNY EUR GBP HKD JPY USD KZT

== See also ==
- Economy of Kyrgyzstan
- Uzbekistani sum
