= Japıy uulu Tynybek =

Tınıbek Japıy uulu (Тыныбек Жапый уулу; c. 1846–1902) was a Kyrgyz manaschi.

He taught and influenced Sagımbay Orozbakov, Jüsüpakun Apay, Eshmat Manbetjüsüp, and Togolok Moldo.

His version of 'Semetey', transcribed circa 1902, was published in Arabic script in Moscow in 1925 by Ishenaaly Arabaev. This publication, transliterated into Latin script, with a new introduction, was printed in Berlin in 1943. by 'S. Bet-Alman' (pseudonym of Satar Almanbetov). As part of the Kyrgyz government funded 1000 years celebration of Manas, the work was republished, in Cyrillic script, in 1994.
