= Kenje Kara =

Kyrgyz poet

Kenje Kara (1859–1929) was a Kyrgyz epic singer. He is notable for being the first Kyrgyz-language artist, and the first manaschi, to be recorded.

== 1903/4 Recording ==
In 1903/4, a Russian expedition party led by Aleksandr G. Belinskii made six wax photograph cylinders, around 17 minutes in length, of Kenje Kara improvising a narrative concerning Manas's son Semetey and his love-interest Ayčürök. The atypical context - recording in a colonial police station in front of an audience unfamiliar with the Kyrgyz language and Kyrgyz oral culture - meant the recording captures 'the work of a good bard on a bad day.'

An account of Kenje Kara's performance was published in 1914 by the expedition's artist Boris Smirnov. Smirnov's portrait of Kenje Kara included in the book is significant for being the first known illustration of a named Kyrgyz epic singer. Smirnov's volume also contained a summary of the narrative (that differed from the recording) made by the expeditions translator, the Kazakh Atey-bek. The products of this performance 'testify to misunderstandings between the performer and the audience'.

== Later life ==
Kenje Kara later performed a lament at the memorial feast of the Sarbagis chieftain Sabdan Jantay, who had formerly been the subject of poems by Musa Chaghatay uulu.

== The Cylinders and their posthumous Reception ==
The cylinders languished for decades in the Russian Academy of Sciences. A text was transcribed, and later published with an English translation and musical score, along with additional material, by Daniel Prior in 2006. Kenje Kara's short recorded performance has been used by scholars to understand imaginary Kyrgyz geographies concerning Mount Qaf and as a comparative example of a poetic simile.
