= Er Töshtük =

Epic of the Kyrgyz people and Turkic mythology

Er Töstik is a Central Asian oral epic best known in the Kyrgyz version recorded by Vasily Radlov in 1885. In its occurrences in Kyrgyz it is often incorporated into the Epic of Manas. It exists in other languages and cultures as well, including the Kazakhs and the Tatars in the Siberian ares of Tyumen. Recorded versions appear since the middle of the 19th century. Besides the version by Radlov, a French translation by Pertev Naili Boratav was published in 1965; this version was based on a performance of the epic by the manaschi Sayakbay Karalaev.

The poem offers a conversion narrative similar to that found in Tarikh-i Dost Sultan, in which Ötemish Hajji is operative in the conversion of the Sufi saint Baba Tükles.
