= Manasology =

Field of research

Manasology (Kyrgyz: Манас таануу, lit. 'Manas studies') is a specialised field of research within Kyrgyz studies that focuses on the scholarly examination of the Epic of Manas. Researchers in this scientific field are called Manasologists.

== Periods of development ==
Scientific research of the epic began in the second half of the 19th century by Ch. Valikhanov and V. Radlov. Valikhanov had recorded one of the episodes ("Pominki po Kyokyotoyu") in 1856 and partially translated it into Russian. The texts published by Radlov in 1885 in St. Petersburg (in Kyrgyz and German languages) occupy 12,454 lines (including 9,449 lines about "Manas"). Full record of the texts of the "Manas" trilogy has been carried out since 1920, however, fixing versions by manaschi, let alone their full publication is still far from complete.

Kazakh writer M.O. Auezov wrote the first work after Chokan Valikhanov's works, a monograph on the Kyrgyz "Manas" epic, by creating a free version of his texts. Monuments were erected for both Kazakh researchers in the Bishkek city. Among the Russian scientists who studied the epic were V. Radlov (the author of the first Russian translation of fragments of the epic), P. Falev (the author of the first Soviet study on "Manas" - articles "How the Kara-Kygyz epic is built") and S. Malov.

The All-Union Scientific Conference of 1952 in Frunze came to the conclusion that the epic "is folk in its basis".

Among the translators of the epic into Russian are S. Lipkin, L. Penkovsky, M. Tarlovskiy and others. The largest Russian translation (prosaic) is in 4 volumes so far by A.S. Mirbadaleva and N. V. Kydaish-Pokrovskaya for a bilingual edition in the series "Epic of the Peoples of the USSR" (1984-1995), covering about 50 thousand lines (according to S.Orozbakov).

The first one who played the "Manas" epic in Russian language in the translations of E. Polivanov, L. Penkovsky, M. Tarlevsky and S. Lipkin, is a national artist of Kyrgyzstan Valery Rovinsky.

Abbreviated versions of the epic exist in Kazakh language (4 volumes in M. Auezov's presentation, including 2 parts about Manas and the part about Semetey and Seytek) and in Uzbek language (the poet Mirtemir); separate episodes were translated into German, Hungarian, English and other languages.

== Scientific institutions ==
The main center of Manas studies is the National Center for Manas Studies and Art Culture of the National Academy of Sciences of the Kyrgyz Republic (director - Akmataliev, Abdyldazhan Amanturovich).
