= Eshmat Mambetjusup =

Kyrgyz manaschy (1880–1963)

- ەشمات مامبەتجۉسۉپ
- Born: 1880; Akbulak, Ulugqat Township, Kizilsu Kyrgyz Autonomous Prefecture
- Died: 1963
- Occupation: Manaschy
- Known for: Recitation and preservation of the Epic of Manas

Eshmat Mambetjusup (also Eshmat Manbetjüsüp) (Kyrgyz: ەشمات مامبەتجۉسۉپ; Эшмат Мамбетжүсүп; Chinese: 艾什玛特·玛木别特朱素普) was a notable Kyrgyz manaschy (a traditional reciter of the Epic of Manas) from China who was active in the late 19th and early 20th centuries. He is recognized for his role in preserving the oral traditions of the epic and as a direct student of the renowned master manaschy Japıy uulu Tynybek.

Although he was a "Qong Manaschi" capable of performing seven parts of the epic cycle, the recording project was cut short by his death in 1963. Only Manas, Semetey and parts of Seytek were recorded and parts were also lost during the cultural revolution.

== Biography ==
Mambetjusup was born in Akbulak, in the present day Ulugqat Township, Kizilsu Kyrgyz Autonomous Prefecture in 1880.

Mambetjusup studied the art of reciting the Epic of Manas under the tutelage of Tynybek Japyy uulu. During his time with Tynybek, Mambetjusup honed his craft alongside other future master manaschys, including the celebrated Sagymbai Orozbak uulu and Jusubakun Apay.

== Legacy ==
Mambetjusup represents a crucial link in the cross-border transmission of the Manas epic. His renditions of the first three parts of the Manas epic cycle were recorded in the 1960s, though the first part was lost during the Cultural Revolution, and the remaining 11,070 lines of Semetey and Seytek recorderd in 1961 were finally published in 2003.
