= Sagymbai Orozbak uulu =

Traditional Kyrgyz poet

Orozbakov in 1925.

Sagimbai Orozbakov (1868–1930) was a Kyrgyz manaschi, or reciter of the Epic of Manas. The first reputable and complete edition of his noted variant of Manas was published in 2010. It was the first to cover the whole life of the titular hero.

== Biography ==
Orozbakov studied under his predecessor Tınıbek Japıy uulu. Kyrgyz historian Belek Soltonoyev witnessed Orozbakov perform in 1908. During the events of 1916, he fled to Xinjiang where, in 1917, he participated in an aitish with Jüsüpakun Apay. Orozbakov received criticism regarding his style and accuracy in both performances.

== Transcribing Manas, 1922–1926 ==
The lengthy variant contains notable innovations. Orozbakov appears to have been the first to replace the previous category of qissa (story) with the term tarikh (history), incorporated new learning, and presented mythical locations as if they were actual locations. It was the first to explicitly define Manas as Kyrgyz. Orozbakov includes elements of pan-Turkism and pan-Islamism. These innovative features were possibly introduced to appease his patron Kayum Miftakov. Ironically, this led Orozbakov and Manas to be regarded in the Soviet era as representative of pre-Revolution Kyrgyz society.

Manuscripts of this version are held at the National Academy of Sciences of the Republic of Kyrgyzstan.

== Legacy ==
Sections such as the birth of Manas were published in Abdurakmanov's Manas Series. Soviet methods of translation allowed Semyon Lipkin to publish recast adaptations of sections (and provide material for his novella). The Russian translation was used by Maurice Bowra in his comparative studies of Homer and epic poetry.

Post-war ideological criticism of Manas, and its defence by scholars such as Mukhtar Auezov, led to the demand of a 'harmonized' politically acceptable version incorporating Orozbakov's variant. A revised version was published in 1958–1962. Later, due to Soviet-era scholars desiring a critical edition, and despite continued ideological debates, a new version (containing prose summaries owing to financial constraints) was created. A seemingly complete edition was published in 2010. An English-language translation was published by Penguin in 2022.

Though the complete trilogy—Manas, Semetey, and Seitek—totalling over half a million lines by Sayakbay Karalaev is often mentioned, Orozbakov's version is more accessible and more known. His variant is considered an imitative model and reference point, and a passage from his published version was reused in a modern performance by a contemporary manaschi, Talantaaly Bakchiev.

Manuscripts of the 1922-1926 version by Orozbakov were placed on UNESCO's Memory of the World International Register.
