= Doolot Sydykov =

Contemporary manaschi

Doolot Sydykov (born 1983), is a manaschi (a reciter of the Kyrgyz epic of Epic of Manas).

In November 2020, he recited the epic continuously in Ala-Too Square in Bishkek for a record 14 hours and 27 minutes. In September 2021, he recited the epic for 111 hours over a five day period in Moscow.

His earlier attempts to promote the epic included touring across Kyrgyzstan in 2012 performing with Talantaaly Bakchiev, making audiovisual recordings of his performances depicting the funeral feast for Kokotoi Khan and episodes from Semetey, and performing with Solenye Oreshki, a jazz band.

While popularising the epic, he has also spoken out against the commercialization of the epic (such as branding alcohol with the names of the epic's heroes).

Transcriptions of three audiovisual recordings, made at the American University of Central Asia, narrating the birth of the titular character, Manas, available online, have been studied to reveal his in-performance composition methods.

In 2022, he left Kyrgyzstan owing to a political dispute regarding the Manas Ayyly (Museum).
