= Music of Kyrgyzstan =

Kyrgyz music is nomadic and rural, and is closely related to Turkmen and Kazakh folk forms. Kyrgyz folk music is characterized by the use of long, sustained pitches, with Russian elements also prominent.

== Traditional music ==
Travelling musicians and shamans called manaschi are popular for their singing and komuz-playing. Their music is typically heroic epics, such as the most famous story, the Manas epic (20 times longer than Homer's Odyssey), which is the patriotic tale of a warrior named Manas, and his descendants, who fight with the Chinese. There are modern reciters of the Manas who are very popular, such as Rysbek Jumabaev and Sayaqbay Karalaev.

Aside from the komuz, Kyrgyz folk instruments include the kyl kiak (qyl-qyiyak), a two-stringed upright bow instrument (cf. fiddle), sybyzgy, a side-blown flute, chopo-choor and the temir ooz komuz (mouth komuz), also known as jaw harp in some countries. The komuz is the national instrument of Kyrgyzstan. It is a plucked string instrument. The kyl kiak, however, is also an important symbol of Kyrgyz identity. It is a string instrument, related to the Mongolian morin khuur, and is associated with horses and the vital role they play in Kyrgyz culture. Shamanistic elements of Kyrgyz folk culture remain, including the dobulba (a frame drum), the asa-tayak (a wooden device decorated with bells and other objects) and the earlier mentioned kyl kiak.

A widespread variety of instrumental music called kui (or küü) tells narratives that revolve around a musical journey. The narrative, which is entirely expressed without words, is sometimes punctuated with exaggerated gestures to mark important parts of the story.

=== Performers ===
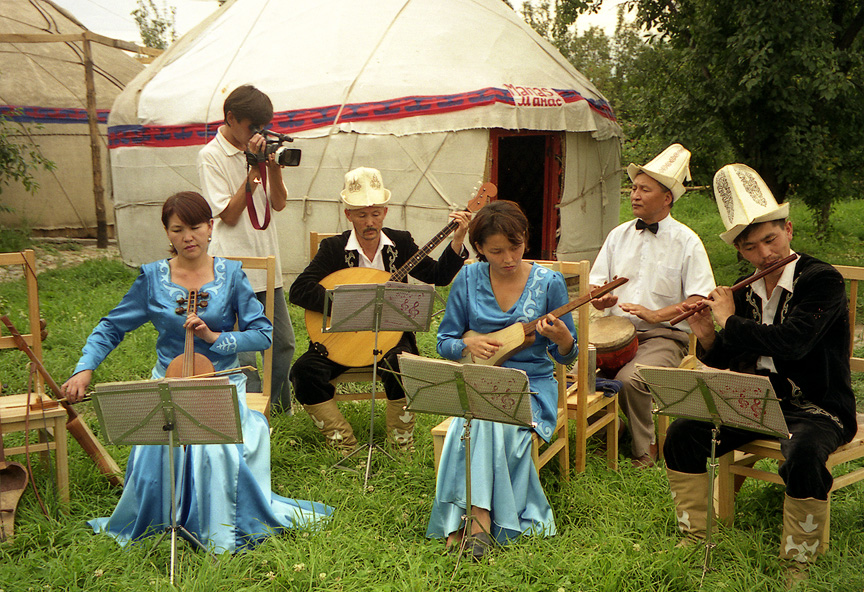
A group of Kyrgyz musicians performing in a yurt camp in Karakol

Modern interpreters of Kyrgyz traditional music include the Kambarkan national folk ensemble.

Salamat Sadikova is a popular traditional Kyrgyz singer with a strong voice, who is capable of holding notes for a remarkably long duration. Her repertoire includes contemporary folk-style compositions as well as folk songs.

Other notable acts include Tengir-Too, the Djunushov Brothers, Jusup Aisaev, Gulnur Satylganova, and Zere Asylbek. Kyrgyz writer and musician Elmirbek Imanaliyev died in April 2020.

== Western classical music ==
During the Soviet rule, Kyrgyz music and performance arts has incorporated many Western genres and influences. The Kyrgyz State Theatre of Opera and Ballet named after Abdylas Maldybayev was established in 1926. Kyrgyz composers created numerous operas and music for ballet performances.

== Pop music ==
Rock and metal music is popular in Kyrgyzstan. Darkestrah is a well-known metal band from Bishkek, now based in Germany. Their music combines traditional Kyrgyz folk music with black metal. Since the 2010s rap music by local artists in both Kyrgyz and Russian has significantly gained popularity. In the 2020s the capital of Kyrgyzstan witnessed a wave of protest rap songs, most famously the song Sayasat ("Politics"), in which the rapper Begish unleashed a scathing critique against corruption in Kyrgyz politics. Other politically motivated rap songs deal with environmental issues such as the extreme air pollution in Bishkek. There is also a new pop genre called Z-Pop which influenced mainly by K-Pop and western pop music.

== Gallery ==
Cultural depictions of the Music of Kyrgyzstan
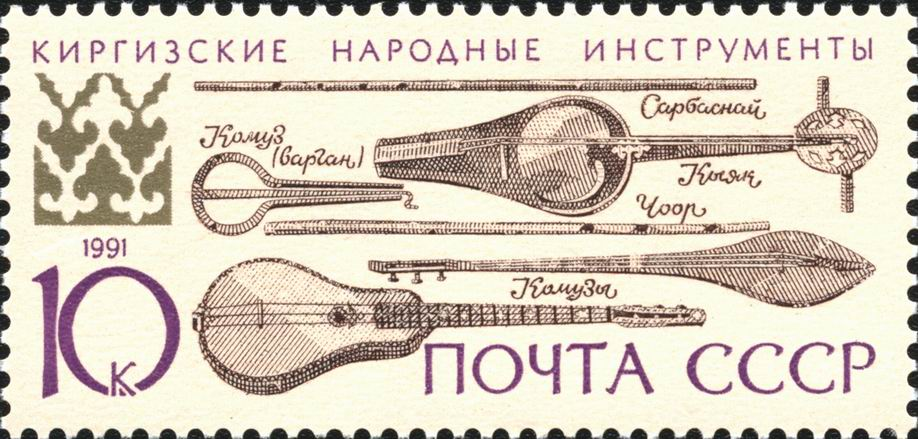
Soviet postage stamp depicting traditional Kyrgyz musical instruments

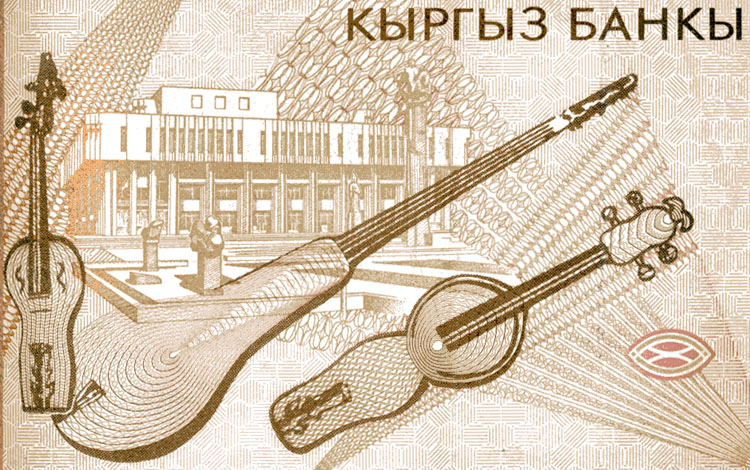
The back of the Kyrgyz 1 Som banknote shows some traditional instruments, including a komuz (centre)

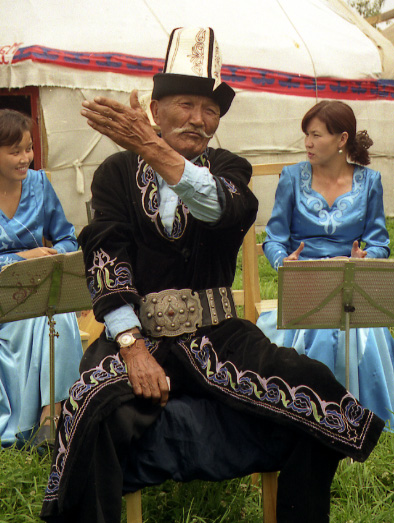
A traditional Kyrgyz manaschi performing part of the epic poem
