= Togolok Moldo =

Kyrgyz poet

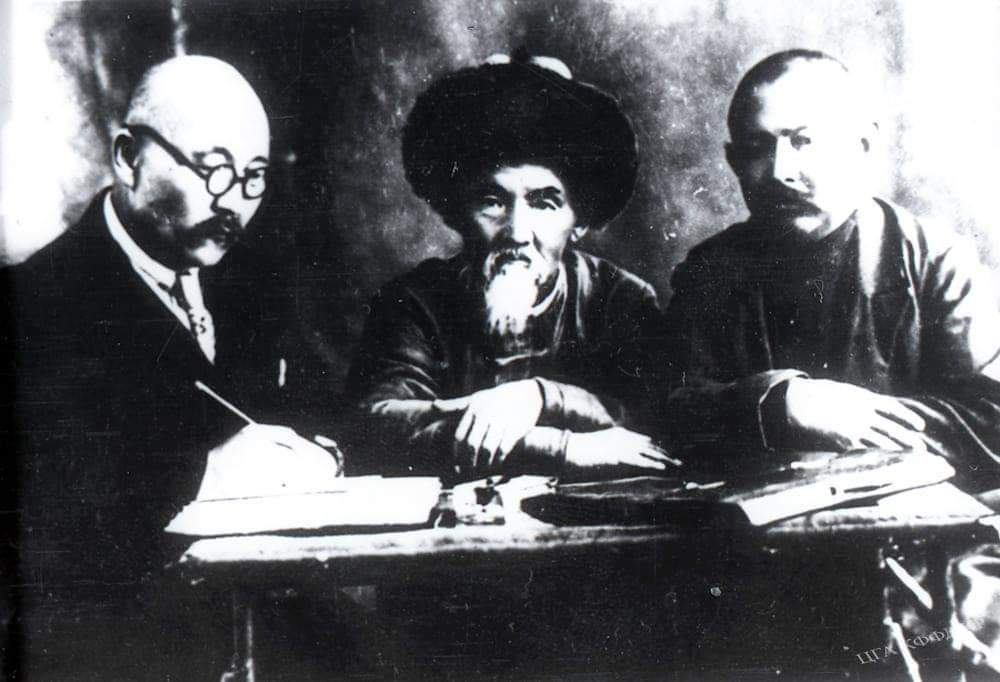
- Togolok Moldo in the 1930s.
- Born: Байымбет Абдырахман уулу (Bayymbet Abdyrahman uulu); 10 June 1860; Kurtka, Russian Empire (now Ak-Talaa District, Naryn Region, Kyrgyzstan)
- Died: 4 January 1942 (aged 81); Naryn, Kirghiz SSR, Soviet Union
- Occupations: Poet, Manaschi, writer
- Writing career
- Genres: Epic poetry, Satire, Folklore
- Notable work: Epic of Manas
- Movement: Kyrgyz Enlightenment / Oral Tradition

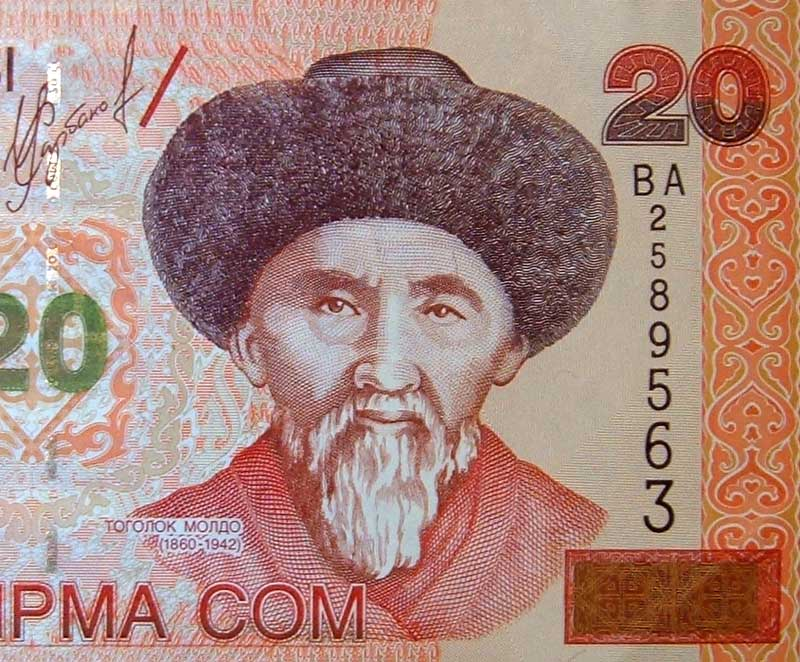
Togolok Moldo on the Kyrgyz 20 som note.

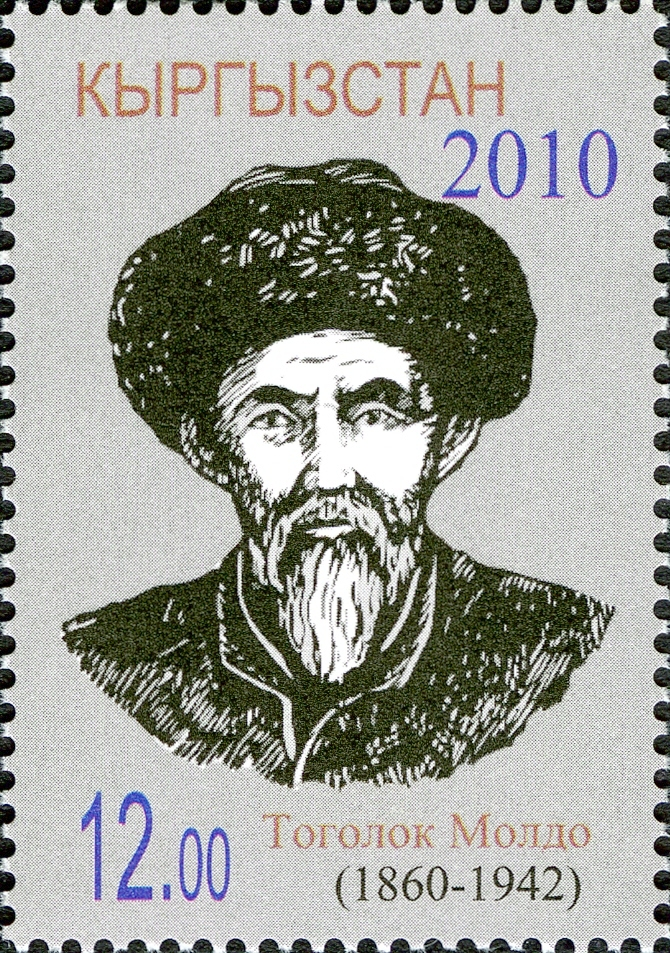
Togolok Moldo on a 2010 Kyrgyz stamp.

Togolok Moldo (Kyrgyz: Тоголок Молдо; real name: Байымбет Абдырахман уулу, Bayymbet Abdyrahman uulu; 10 June 1860 – 4 January 1942) was a Kyrgyz poet, Manaschi and folk song writer. Born in the village Kurtka in what is now the Ak-Talaa District, Naryn Region, Kyrgyzstan. Togolok Moldo by his audiences – "togolok" means round-faced, "moldo" means an educated person. He is buried near the village of about 3,000 persons named for him in Ak-Talaa district.

A 'Semetey', totalling around 2050 lines, was collected from him by Kayum Miftakov in 1922. His later self-transcribed version of Manas was published in 2013. A manuscript of a sanjira (genealogy) was edited and published in 2009.

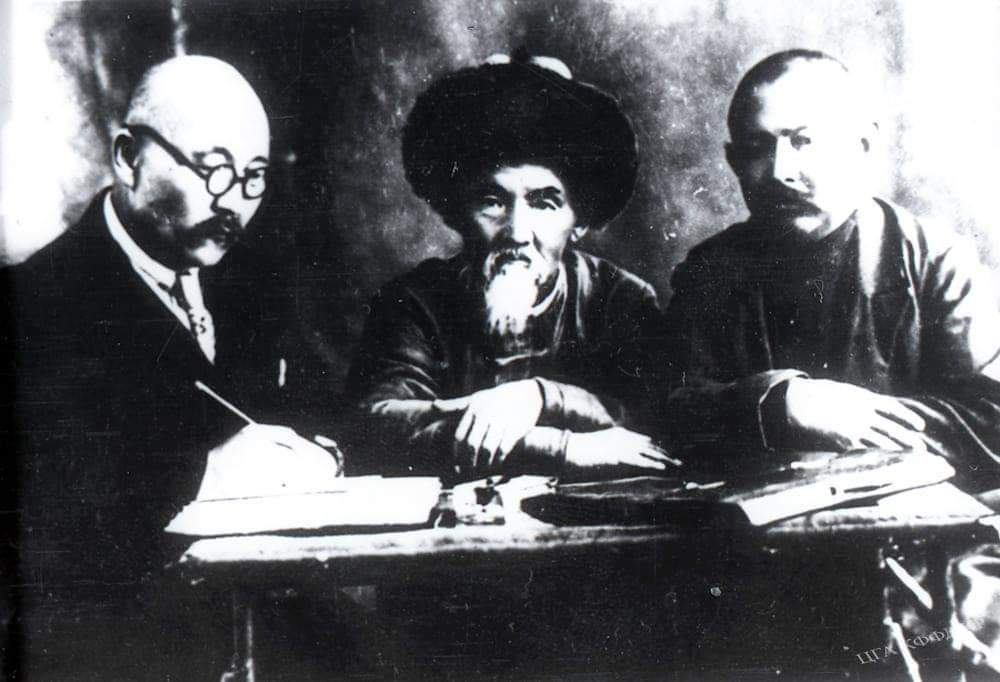
From left to right: personal secretary of Togolok Moldo Ybraiym Abdyrakhmanov, akyn Togolok Moldo and famous narrator of the epic "Manas" Sayakbay Karalayev. 1930s

== Bibliography ==
- Baldar jomoktoru (Children's stories) (1939), Kyrgyzstan National Press.
- Sanjyra, (2009)
- Manas (2013)
