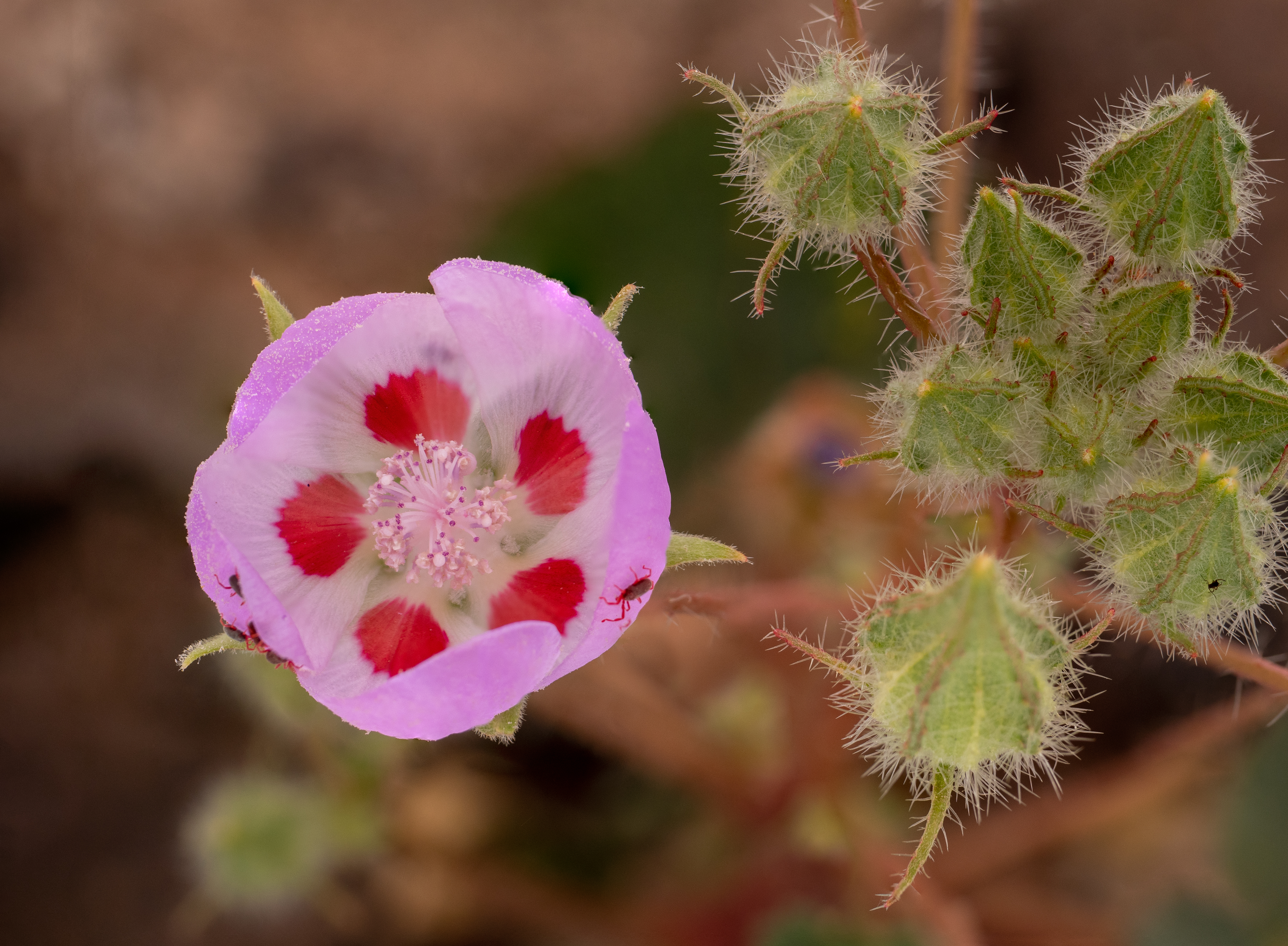

Scientific classification
- Kingdom: Plantae
- Clade: Tracheophytes
- Clade: Angiosperms
- Clade: Eudicots
- Clade: Rosids
- Order: Malvales
- Family: Malvaceae
- Genus: Eremalche
- Species: E. rotundifolia

Binomial name
- Eremalche rotundifolia (A.Gray) Greene

= Eremalche rotundifolia =

Species of flowering plant

Eremalche rotundifolia, the desert five-spot, is a flowering plant in the family Malvaceae, native to the Mojave Desert and Colorado Desert in the Southwestern United States.

This dicot and annual herb is found in scrublands, desert flats, washes and open stony areas between 50 and 1,500 m in elevation. It can be found in Anza-Borrego Desert State Park and in Death Valley National Park in southern California. It can also be found in Nevada and Utah.

Generally this wildflower is only found between March and May.

== Description ==
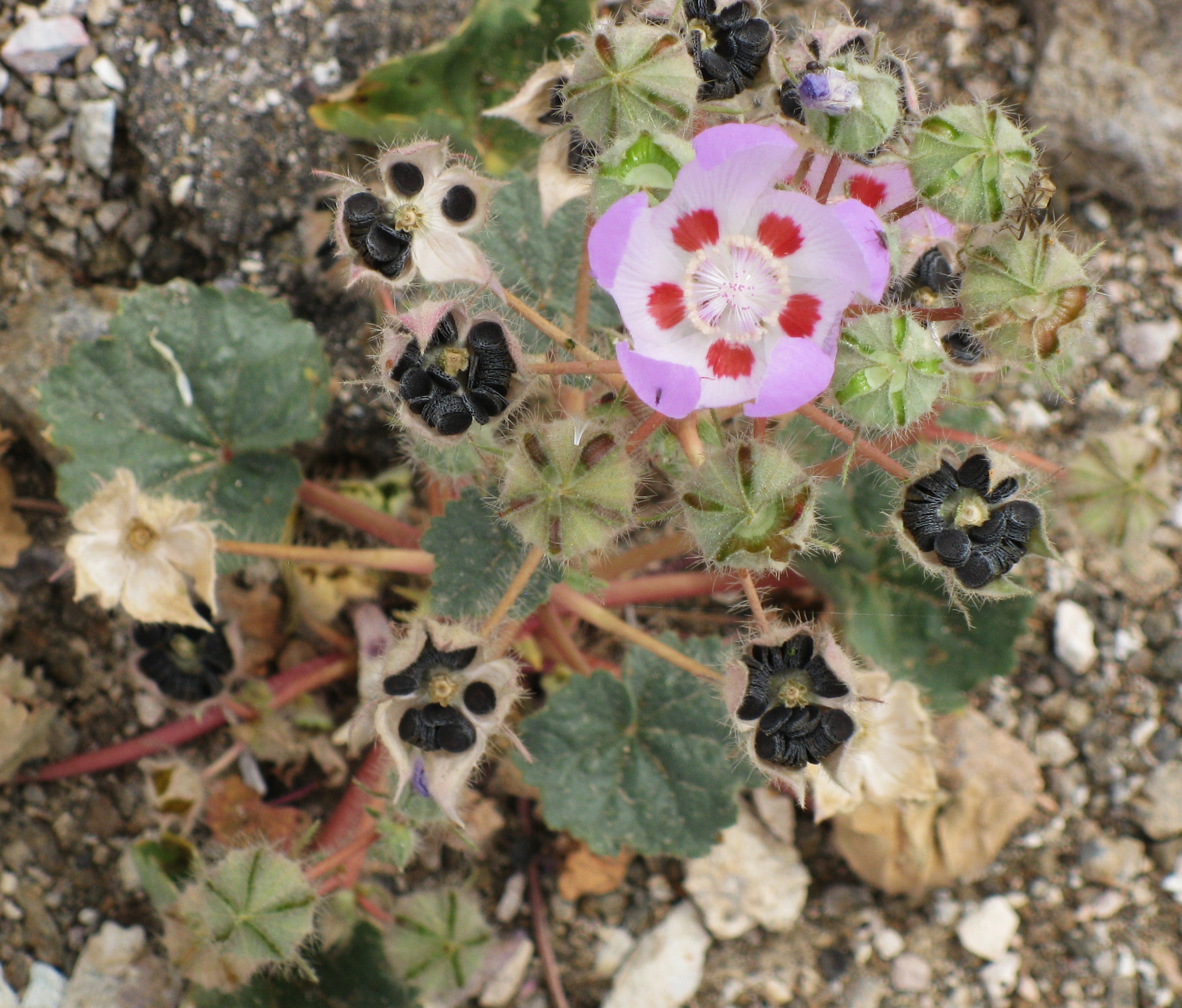
5-spot flower, leaves, seedpods

Eremalche rotundifolia is an annual plant growing to 8–60 cm tall, with rounded leaves 1.5–6 cm broad with a toothed margin.

The flowers are dark-pink to lilac with five overlapping petals, each with a dark red/purple spot near the base. When fully open the petals are slightly in-curved, giving the flower a nearly spherical shape. The center contains a ring of light pink stigmas around a group of smaller pink stamens.

The leave are round and green with a covering of short bristly hairs, while the red/brown stems have similar but longer hairs. Stems are usually unbranched.

Petals close at night, reopening the next morning, and the leaves move during the day to receive the maximum amount of sunlight.

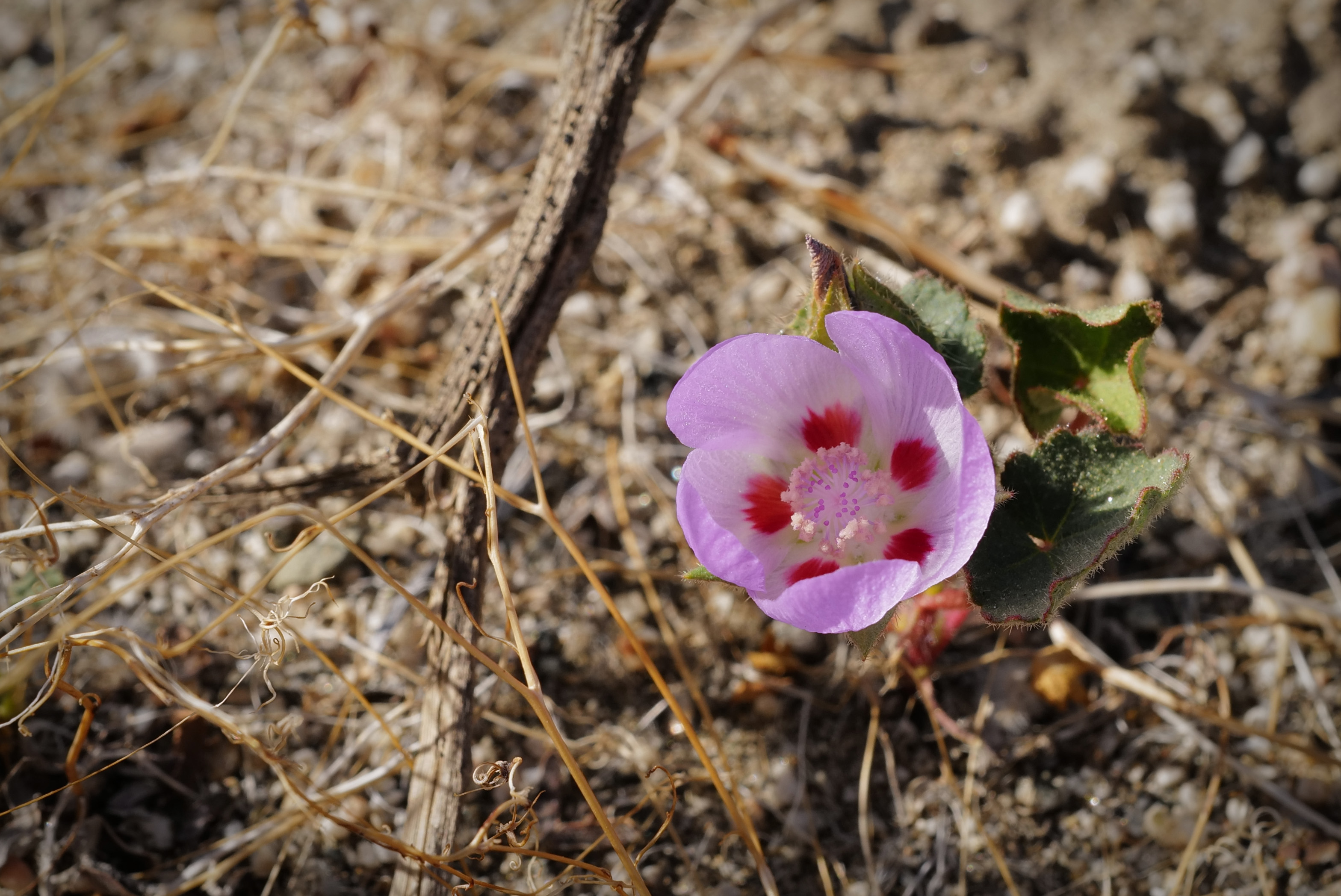
Desert five-spot flowering in Indian Wells, California.
