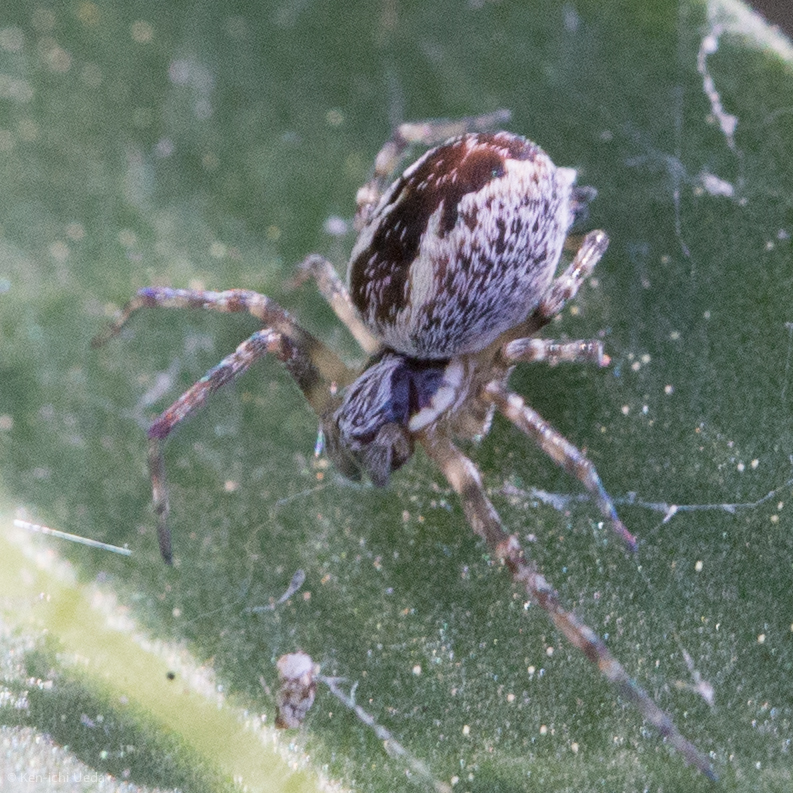

Scientific classification
- Domain: Eukaryota
- Kingdom: Animalia
- Phylum: Arthropoda
- Subphylum: Chelicerata
- Class: Arachnida
- Order: Araneae
- Infraorder: Araneomorphae
- Family: Dictynidae
- Genus: Mallos
- Species: M. pallidus

Binomial name
- Mallos pallidus (Banks, 1904)

= Mallos pallidus =

Species of spider

Mallos pallidus is a species of mesh web weaver in the spider family Dictynidae. It is found in the United States and Mexico.
