= Mallo =

Mallo may refer to:

- Mallo Cup, candy produced by Boyer Brothers
- Assan Jana Mall-o Mall, 2002 pop album by Pakistani singer Abrar-ul-Haq
- The name of the main character in the Nintendo 3DS game Pushmo
- Auriane Mallo (born 1993), French fencer
- Hugo Mallo, Spanish footballer
- Mallo, a social network for deals.

== See also ==
- Mallos (disambiguation)
- Malo (disambiguation)
- Malloa, Chilean commune and town in Cachapoal Province, O'Higgins Region
- Mallow (disambiguation)
- Malloy, surname
