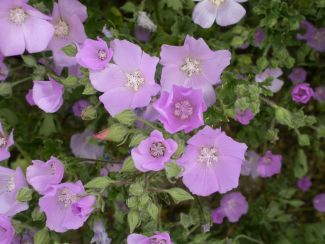
- subsp. parryi

Conservation status
- Vulnerable (NatureServe)

Scientific classification
- Kingdom: Plantae
- Clade: Embryophytes
- Clade: Tracheophytes
- Clade: Angiosperms
- Clade: Eudicots
- Clade: Rosids
- Order: Malvales
- Family: Malvaceae
- Genus: Eremalche
- Species: E. parryi

Binomial name
- Eremalche parryi Greene

= Eremalche parryi =

Species of flowering plant

Eremalche parryi is a species of flowering plant in the mallow family known by the common name Parry's mallow.

It is endemic to California, where it grows in several types of habitat from the Diablo Range and down the Inner South California Coast Ranges to the Transverse Ranges, and across the San Joaquin Valley.

== Description ==
Eremalche parryi is an annual herb growing erect to half a meter in maximum height. The leaves are up to 5 centimeters long and divided into several tooth-tipped lobes. The flowers are located in leaf axils and sometimes at the stem tips.

The flower varies in size, the petals half a centimeter to 2.5 centimeters long. They are white to light purple or pink.

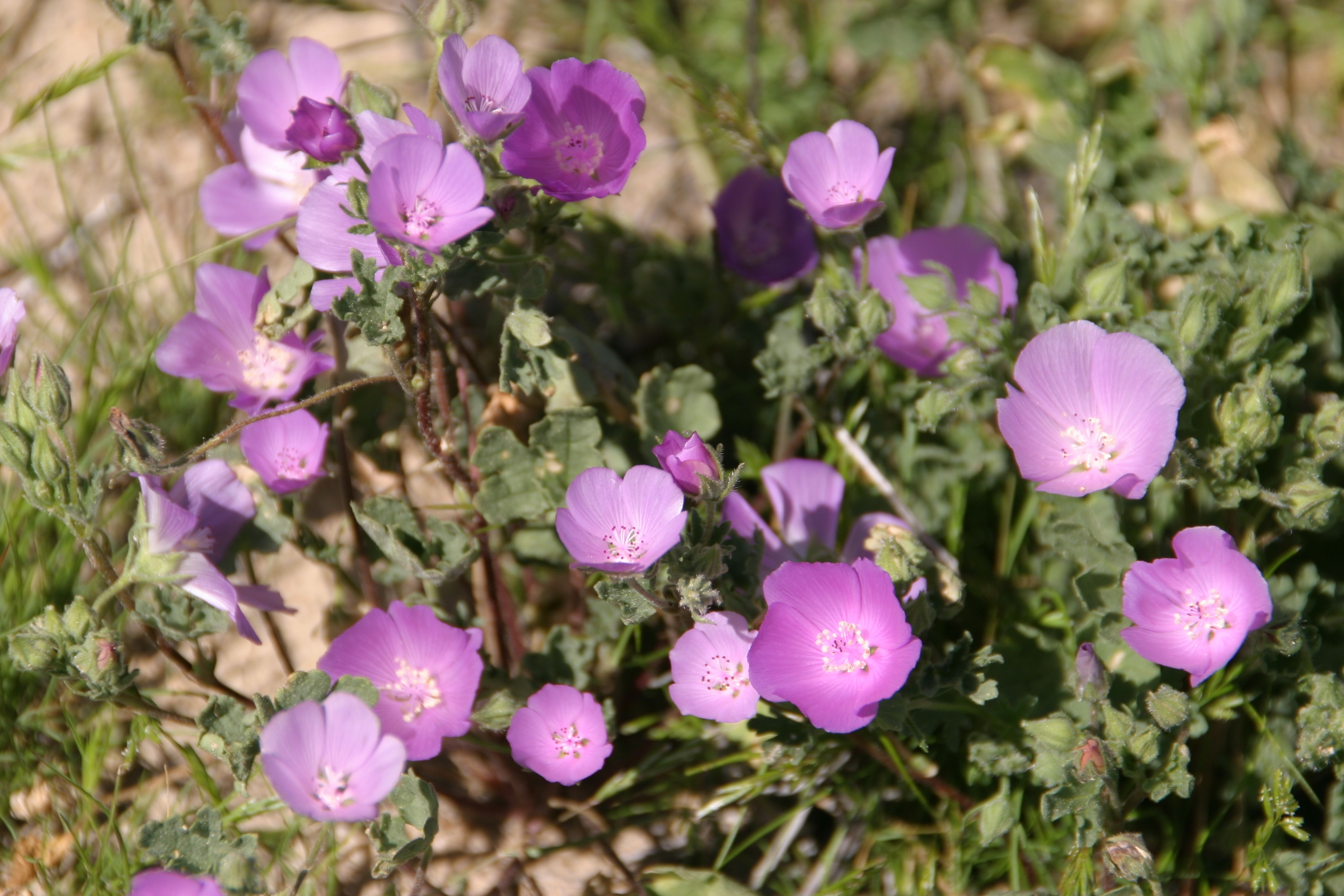
Kern mallow (E. parryi ssp. kernensis), Carrizo Plain National Monument.

=== Subspecies ===
- Eremalche parryi ssp. kernensis — Kern mallow

A rare plant known only from western Kern County, California around the tiny community of McKittrick and Carrizo Plain National Monument in eastern San Luis Obispo County.

It is sometimes treated as a species of its own, Eremalche kernensis, especially by local botanists, or the plants may be considered members of a spectrum, the Kern/Parry's mallow complex, without further formal definition. This subspecies has an uncertain taxonomy.

Regardless of designation, Kern mallow is still a federally listed endangered species. Threats to the Kern mallow's survival include the construction of and impacts to the watershed from the California Aqueduct and grazing, pesticide use, and land conversion in the heavily agricultural San Joaquin Valley region where it grows.

- Eremalche parryi ssp. parryi
