= Mallos pearcei =

Scientific classification
- Kingdom: Animalia
- Phylum: Arthropoda
- Subphylum: Chelicerata
- Class: Arachnida
- Order: Araneae
- Infraorder: Araneomorphae
- Family: Dictynidae
- Genus: Mallos
- Species: M. pearcei

Binomial name
- Mallos pearcei Chamberlin & Gertsch, 1958

Species of spider

Mallos pearcei is a species of mesh web weavers in the family Dictynidae. It is found in the USA.
