= Mallos =

Mallos may refer to:

- Mallos, a form of Saint Dane, character in the Pendragon series by D.J. MacHale
- Mallos (Cilicia), an ancient city in Cilicia, Anatolia
- Mallos (Pisidia), an ancient town of Pisidia, Anatolia
- Mallos de Riglos, a set of rock formations in Huesca province in Spain
- Mallos (spider), a spider genus
- Tess Mallos, Australian food and cooking, writer, journalist, author, and commentator

== See also ==
- Mallo (disambiguation)
