= Ala-Too Square =

Central square in Bishkek, Kyrgyzstan

- Площадь Ала-Тоо (Russian); Ала-Тоо аянты (Kyrgyz)
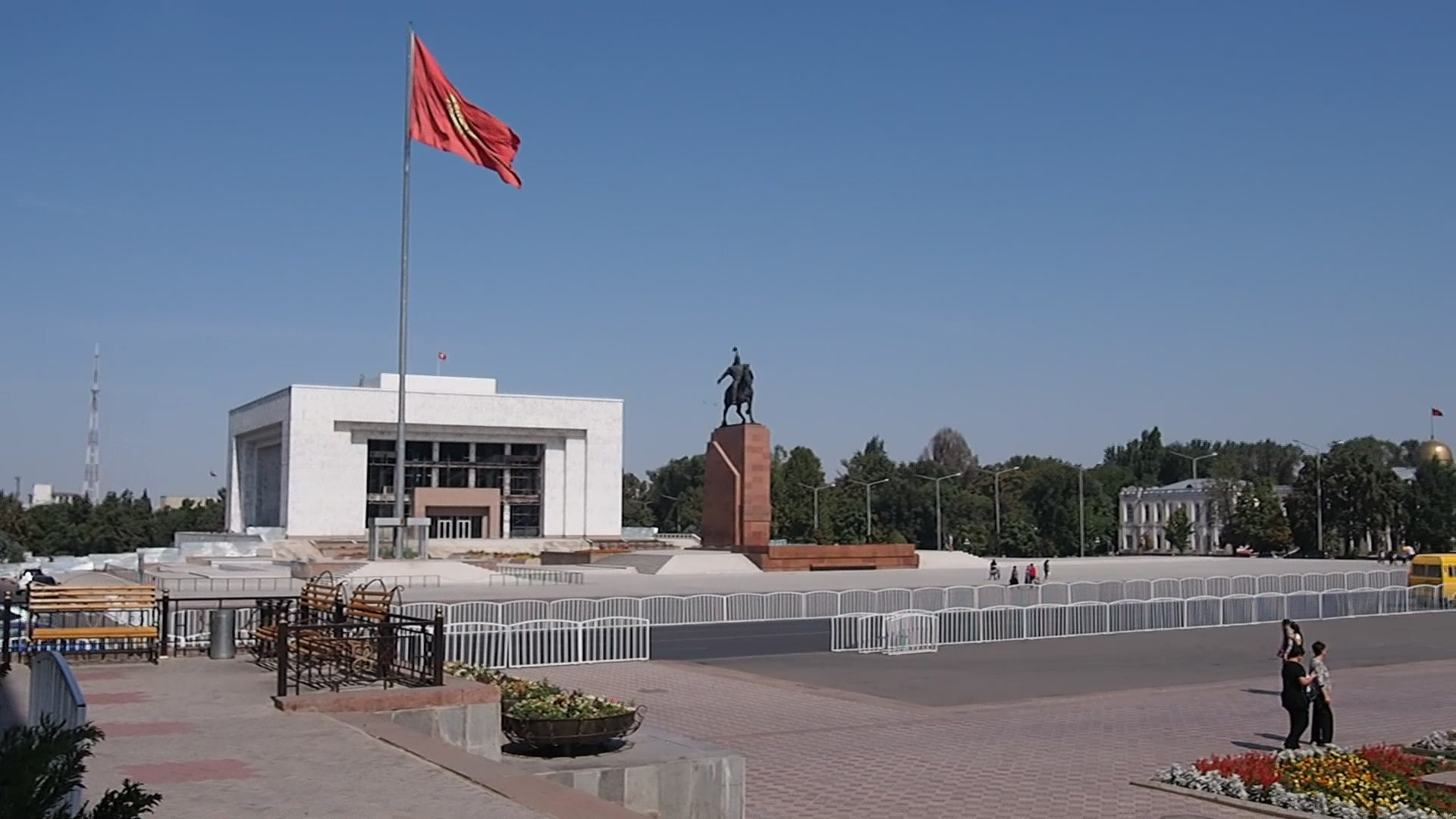
- The State Historical Museum and Manas statue
- Interactive map of Ala-Too Square
- Former name: Lenin Square
- Type: Square
- Location: Bishkek, Kyrgyzstan
- Coordinates: 42°52′35″N 74°36′14″E

Construction
- Completed: 1984

Other
- Known for: The Central Square in Bishkek

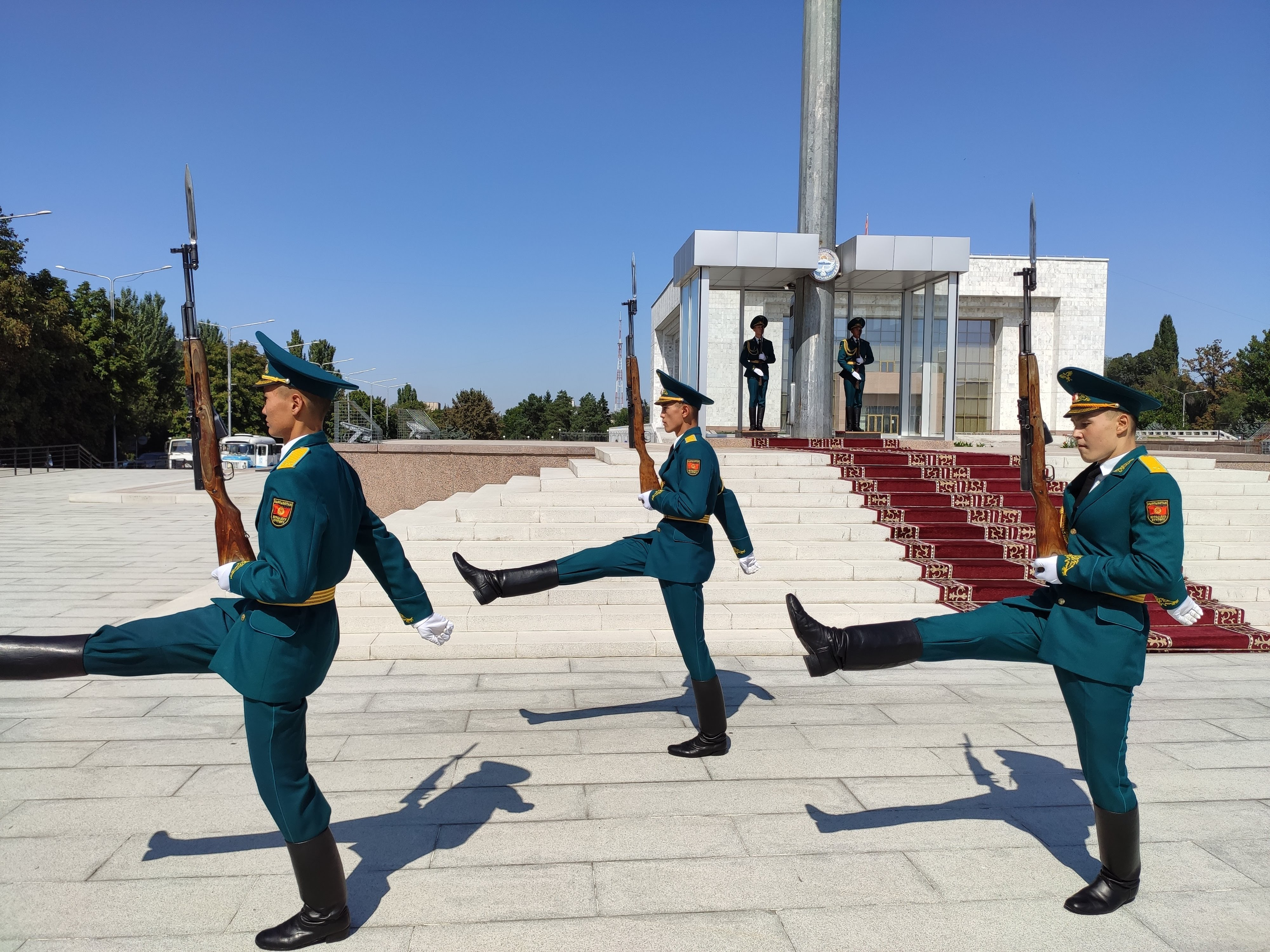
Changing of the guard at Ala-Too Square

Ala-Too Square (Note: Kyrgyz: Ала-тоо аянты, romanized: Ala-too aianty, IPA: [ɑɫɑtʰóː ɑjɑntʰɯ́]; Russian: Площадь Ала-Тоо, romanized: Ploščadj Ala-Too, IPA: [ˈpɫoɕːɪtʲ əɫɐˈto]) Ala-Too Square is the central public square in Bishkek, Kyrgyzstan. Established in 1984 to commemorate the 60th anniversary of the Kirghiz Soviet Socialist Republic, it was originally known as Lenin Square. It has been the site of major political demonstrations, including the 2005 Tulip Revolution and the 2010 Kyrgyz Revolution. The square features the State Historical Museum, the Manas monument, a national flagpole and a memorial to victims of the 2010 revolution.

== History ==
The square was built in 1984 to celebrate the 60th anniversary of the Kirghiz Soviet Socialist Republic, at which time a massive statue of Lenin was placed in the square's center. The square was known as Lenin Square until Kyrgyzstan gained its Independence from the USSR in 1991. The statue of Lenin was moved in 2003 to a smaller square in the city, and a new statue called Erkindik ('Freedom') was installed in its place. In 2011, it was replaced by a statue of Manas, to celebrate the 20th anniversary of Kyrgyzstan's independence.

A monument to the victims of the April 2010 revolution stands on the square, which also holds a statue of Chinghiz Aitmatov and a national flagpole at the foot of which a guard of honour is posted. The guard is changed every hour, a ceremony that has become a tourist attraction.

The cube-shaped museum reopened in November 2021 after a long renovation and has a preserved ceiling of Soviet ceramic murals on its top floor. Opposite it, the square has fountains, including a light and music fountain, and flower beds. The statue of Lenin removed in 2003 now stands behind the museum on the Old Square. The square is open at any hour.

== Protests ==
On 24 March 2005, the square was the site of the largest antigovernmental protest of Kyrgyzstan's Tulip Revolution. After several weeks of unrest throughout the country, over 15,000 people gathered early in the afternoon to protest the results of the 2005 parliamentary elections. Two people were killed and over 100 wounded when the protesters clashed with government officials. However, the protesters soon took control of the square, and stormed the White House, forcing Askar Akayev, Kyrgyzstan's first president, to flee the country and later resign from office.

== Events ==
The square serves as a place for state events and celebrations. In 2008, it was the site of a memorial ceremony for world-renowned Kyrgyz writer Chinghiz Aitmatov.

On the 70th anniversary of the Second World War in 2015, the first Victory Day military parade on Ala-Too Square took place in the presence of Prime Minister Temir Sariyev and Chief of the Armed Forces General Staff Asanbek Alymkozhoev.

In November 2020, manaschi Doolot Sydykov recited the Epic of Manas continuously for a record 14 hours and 27 minutes.
