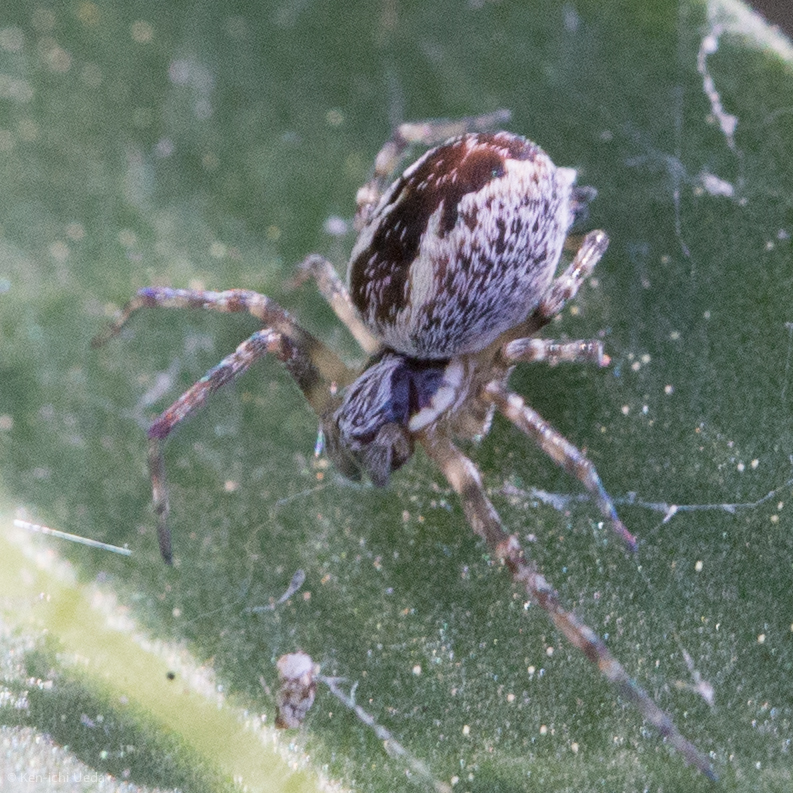
- Mallos pallidus

Scientific classification
- Domain: Eukaryota
- Kingdom: Animalia
- Phylum: Arthropoda
- Subphylum: Chelicerata
- Class: Arachnida
- Order: Araneae
- Infraorder: Araneomorphae
- Family: Dictynidae
- Genus: Mallos; O. Pickard-Cambridge, 1902

Type species
- M. niveus O. Pickard-Cambridge, 1902

Species
- 16, see text

= Mallos (spider) =

Genus of spiders

Mallos is a genus of cribellate araneomorph spiders in the family Dictynidae, and was first described by O. Pickard-Cambridge in 1902. Among the genus, Mallos gregalis is known to be a social spider species, living in groups and signaling each other by vibrating their web.

== Species ==
As of May 2019 it contains sixteen species:

- Mallos blandus Chamberlin & Gertsch, 1958 – USA
- Mallos bryanti Gertsch, 1946 – USA, Mexico
- Mallos chamberlini Bond & Opell, 1997 – Mexico
- Mallos dugesi (Becker, 1886) – USA, Mexico
- Mallos flavovittatus (Keyserling, 1881) – Venezuela, Peru
- Mallos gertschi Bond & Opell, 1997 – Mexico
- Mallos gregalis (Simon, 1909) – Mexico
- Mallos hesperius (Chamberlin, 1916) – Mexico to Paraguay
- Mallos kraussi Gertsch, 1946 – Mexico
- Mallos macrolirus Bond & Opell, 1997 – Mexico
- Mallos margaretae Gertsch, 1946 – Costa Rica, Panama
- Mallos mians (Chamberlin, 1919) – USA, Mexico
- Mallos nigrescens (Caporiacco, 1955) – Venezuela
- Mallos niveus O. Pickard-Cambridge, 1902 (type) – USA, Mexico
- Mallos pallidus (Banks, 1904) – USA, Mexico
- Mallos pearcei Chamberlin & Gertsch, 1958 – USA
