= Alykul Osmonov =

Kyrgyzstani poet

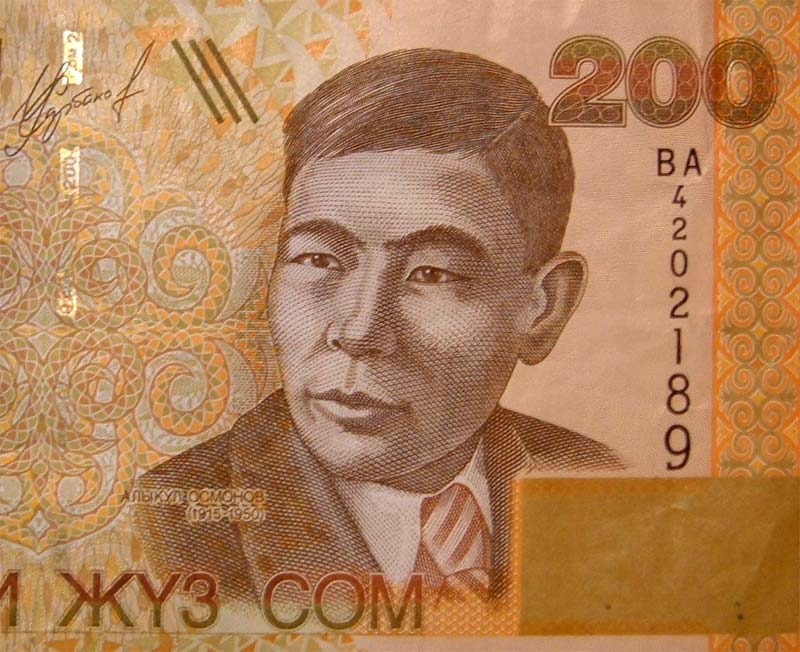
- Osmonov on a 200 Som note
- Born: 21 March 1915; Kaptal-Aryk, Kyrgyzstan
- Died: 12 December 1950 (aged 35); Bishkek, Kyrgyzstan, Soviet Union

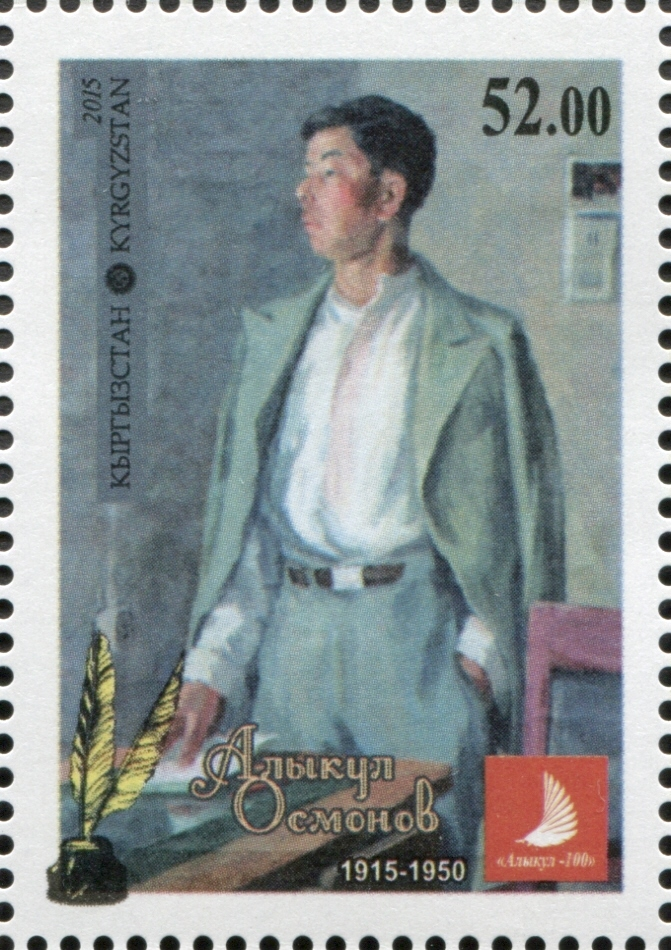
Osmonov on a 2015 stamp of Kyrgyzstan

Alykul Osmonov (Kyrgyz: Алыкул Осмонов, properly transliterated: Alıqul Osmonov; 21 March 1915 – 12 December 1950) was a Kyrgyz poet, significant for his efforts to modernizing poetry in Kyrgyzstan. His main accomplishments were transforming poetry from an oral to a literary tradition, focusing upon secular themes with an emphasis on inner emotion, daily life, and nationalism, and translating numerous European authors into the Kyrgyz language, including William Shakespeare, Sándor Petőfi, and Alexander Pushkin.

== Biography ==
Osmonov was born in Kaptal-Aryk in Panfilov District, Kyrgyzstan, about 75 km west of Bishkek. He was orphaned at a young age and was brought up in state care, first in a Bishkek orphanage, then in a Tokmok orphanage. From 1929, Osmonov studied at pedagogical school in Bishkek, but owing to tuberculosis which he had acquired from one of the orphanages, he was forced to leave. Nevertheless, he was able to begin a journalistic career, working for several early Soviet-era Kyrgyz-language newspapers, including "Chabul" ("Attack"), "Leninchil Jash" ("Lenin's Youth"), and "Kyzyl Kyrgyzstan" ("Red Kyrgyzstan", which continues to exist to this day under the title, "Kyrgyz Tuusu"). From 1939 to 1940, he served as secretary-in-chief for the Kyrgyzstan National Writers Union ("Кыргызстан Улуттук Жазуучулар союзу", which also continues to exist today). A year before, he was granted membership into the Union of Soviet Writers.

His first poem, "Kyzyl Juk" ("Red Strings of Wheat"), was published in 1930, and his first volume of poems, Tandagy Yrlai (Poems at Dawn), in 1935. Eventually he would publish up to 500 poems, including the well-known volume, Mahabat (Love), as well as several major translations, including Shota Rustaveli's The Knight in the Panther's Skin, Shakespeare's Othello and Twelfth Night, and Pushkin's Eugene Onegin. Several of his poems were inspired by his various romantic escapades, in particular his first love, a woman named Aida, whom he pursued in 1934, and his failed marriage to Zeinep Sooranbaeva (1941–1943), as well as the personal tragedies which seemed to pursue him, such as his parents' deaths or his own daughter's death in 1943. He, himself, tragically has died: in Bishkek of pulmonary disease pneumonia in 1950, at the age of 35.

== Awards and museums ==
Osmonov was awarded the "Stalin Prize" (USSR State Prize) in 1950, and posthumously the "Lenin Prize" in 1967. His face and a piece of his poetry are on the 200 Kyrgyzstani som piece, and there is a statue of him outside the National Library in Bishkek. Osmonov traveled throughout Kyrgyzstan, and today there are several museums in his honor, including Bishkek, Tokmok, Cholpon-Ata, and especially his hometown Kaptal-Aryk, in the area of Kara-Balta.

== Works ==
=== Examples ===
"Issik-Kul"

Issyk-Kul, Kyrgyzstan, wave-lapped lake
Young girls on our shore much merriment make
Coral bracelets, lost long centuries since
Seem to shine in your depths, and brilliance wake.

АТА-ЖУРТ

Жылуу кийин, жолуң кыйын үшүрсүң, Кыш да катуу… бороон улуп, кар уруп… Суугуңду өз мойнума алайын, Жол карайын, токтой турчу, Ата-Журт!

Түндөр жаман… кырсык салып кетпесин, Наалат келип ат тизгинин шарт буруп… Азабыңды өз мойнума алайын, Из карайын, токтой турчу, Ата-Журт!

Жазда башка… Жел тийбесин абайла, Көпкө турбас, мобул турган сур булут. Бүт дартыңды өз мойнума алайын, Сен ооруба, мен ооруюн, Ата-Журт!

Translation:

"Fatherland"

Dress warmer, the road with ice and snow is spread
The winter's severe, the blizzard howls at hand
Your ice chill I take upon my own head
By the road I will wait, stop awhile, my Fatherland!

The nights are bad, may misfortune your road not tread!
That is cruel, if coming, you rain your steed to a stand
Your sorrow and grief I take upon my own head
Your tracks I will seek, stop awhile, my Fatherland!

The spring is unusual, do not catch a cold, lie abed
Not long grey clouds hold back, by storm winds fanned;
Your ills and sickness I take upon my own head
Do not be sick, better that I fall sick, my Fatherland!

=== Kyrgyz Bibliography ===
- Таңдагы ырлар. – Ф.: Кыргызмамбас, 1935. – 127 б.
- Жылдыздуу жаштык: Ырлар жыйнагы. – Ф.: Кыргызмамбас, 1937. – 62 б.
- Чолпонстан: Ырлар жыйнагы. – Ф.: Кыргызмамбас, 1937. – 96 б.
- 8-гвардиялык дивизия (түзүүчү). – Ф.: Кыргызмамбас, 1942. – 35 б.
- Махабат: Ырлар. – Ф.: Кыргызмамбас, 1945. – 76 б.
- Балдар үчүн: Ырлар. – Ф.: Кыргызмамбас, 1947. – 28 б.
- Жаш акындардын ырларынын жыйнагы (түзүүчү). – Ф.: Кыргызмамбас, 1947. – 99 б.
- Менин жерим – ырдын жери: Ырлар. – Ф.: Кыргызмамбас, 1947. – 80 б.
- Жаңы ырлар: Ырлар жана поэмалар. – Ф.: Кыргызмамбас, 1947. – 86 б.
- Жаңы ырлар. – Ф.: Кыргызмамбас, 1939. – 131 б.
- Тандалмалуу ырлар жана поэмалар. – Ф.: Кыргызмамбас, 1954. – 264 б.
- Ата журт: Жарыяланбаган чыгармалар. – Ф.: Кыргызмамбас, 1958. – 200 б.
- Россия: Ырлар. – Ф.: Кыргызмамбас, 1964. – 16 б.
- Чыгармалар жыйнагы: 3 томдук:
- 1-т. – Ф.: Кыргызстан, 1964. – укекеукекукеукев64 б.
- 2-т. – Ф.: Кыргызстан, 1965. – 660 б.
- 3-т. – Ф.: Кыргызстан, 1967. – 670 б.
- Балдар менен турналар: Ырлар. – Ф.: Мектеп, 1965. – 23 б.
- Ырлар жыйнагы. – Ф.: Мектеп, 1965. – 82 б.
- Көл толкуну: Тандалган ырлар жана поэмалар. – Ф.: Кыргызстан, 1972. – 372 б.
- Пионер ыры: Ырлар, поэмалар, котормо. – Ф.: Мектеп, 1974. – 207 б.
- Түлкү менен каздар. – Ф.: Мектеп, 1973 – 19 б.
- Ырлар. – Ф.: Кыргызстан, 1974. – 62 б.
- Толубай сынчы: Ырлар, поэмалар. – Ф.: Мектеп, 1979. – 80 б.
- Балдар жана турналар: Ырлар. – Ф.: Мектеп, 1980. – 10 б.
- Балдар ыры: Ырлар. – Ф.: Мектеп, 1988. – 16 б.
- Чыгармалар жыйнагынын 3 томдугу:
- 1.т.: Ырлар, поэмалар. – Ф.: Кыргызстан, 1984. – 296 б.
- 2.т.: Поэмалар, драмалар, легендалар. – Ф.: Кыргызстан, 1985. – 344 б.
- 3.т.: Котормолор. – Ф.: Кыргызстан, 1986. – 278 б.
- Махабат: Ырлар. – Ф.: Кыргызстан, 1990. – 52 б.
- Көл толкуну – Wayes of the lake. (кырг. – англ. которгон У.Мэй) – Б.: Сорос-Кыргызстан, 1995. – 148 б.
- Аккан суу – Live water: Ырлар/кырг. – англ. котор.У.Мэй. – Б.: Арал фонду, 2000. – 72 б
- Балдарга. Детям. For children – Б.: Алыкул үй борбору, 2000. – 56 б.

=== Russian Bibliography ===
- Мой дом: Стихи. – М.: Сов. писатель, 1950. – 156 с.
- Мой дом: Стихи. – Ф.: Киргизгосиздат, 1954. – 136 с.
- Избранное: Стихотворения. – М.: Сов. писатель, 1955. – 184 с.
- Избранное: Стихи. – М.: Политиздат, 1958. – 304 с.
- Лиса и гуси. – Ф.: Мектеп, 1974. – 20 с.
- Избранное: Стихи и поэмы. – М.: Худож. лит., 1975. – 272 с.
- Дети и журавли. – Ф.: Мектеп, 1981. – 6 с.
- Отчий край: Стихотворения и поэмы. – Ф.: Кыргызстан, 1987. – 256 с.
- Стихотворения и поэмы. – Л.: Сов.писатель. – 1990. – 303 с.

=== Other languages ===
Дети и журавли: Стихи. – Таллин: Ээсти раамат, 1984. – 11 с. – эст. Толубай сынчы: Поэма. – Алма-Ата, 1963. – казак.
