= Rysbek Jumabayev =

- Occupation: Manaschi
- Known for: Has performed around the world

Rysbek Jumabayev is a revered manaschi (reciter of the Kyrgyz epic Manas). He has performed around the world, including in New York and London, and parts of his recitation of Manas have been recorded by the Aga Khan Music Initiative in Central Asia.
