= Musa Chaghatay uulu =

Twentieth-century Kyrgyz poet

Musa Chaghatay uulu was an early-twentieth century Kyrgyz poet. Though little is known about his life, his work, surviving in Soviet era manuscripts and post-Soviet editions, illuminates pre-Soviet Kyrgyz society.

One manuscript, in Arabic script, titled the 'Shabdan Baatır Codex' by its recent editor Daniel Prior, contains poems relating to the Sarbagis chieftain Sabdan Jantay. The volume 'went unnoticed in the literature' until a published Cyrillic transliteration appeared in 2002, and, later, into Latin (with English translation).

Another manuscript contains a poem in Arabic script titled 'Qırghın' ('Slaughter') concerned with the events of 1916. The poem has been described as

a remarkable account of the revolt from the Kyrgyz perspective, testifying to the damaging effects of wartime requisitions and the fear produced by the conscription decree, and with detailed descriptions of events – such as the capture of a load of Russian rifles in the Boom gorge – which were turning points of the rebellion

The poem survives in a manuscript copied by the Bashkir folklorist Kayum Miftakov in 1928. Though the poem also exists in typescript (with seemingly ideological emendations), it was not published until after the collapse of the Soviet Union. The poem was included in a post-Soviet compilation of poetry connected to the revolt, and re-edited, and translated into English, in a volume concerned with the Central Asian Revolt.
