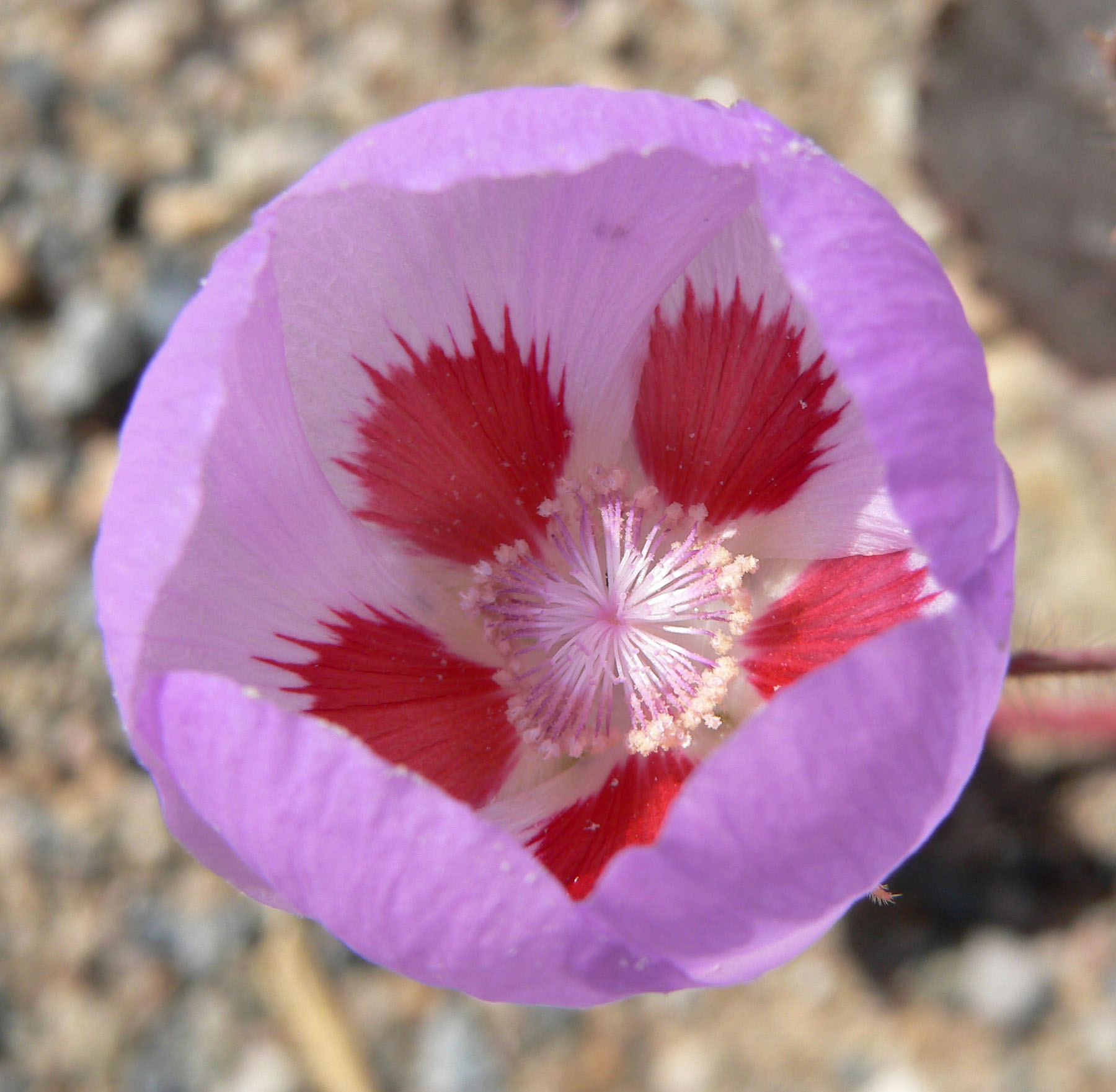
- Eremalche rotundifolia

Scientific classification
- Kingdom: Plantae
- Clade: Tracheophytes
- Clade: Angiosperms
- Clade: Eudicots
- Clade: Rosids
- Order: Malvales
- Family: Malvaceae
- Subfamily: Malvoideae
- Tribe: Malveae
- Genus: Eremalche; Greene

Species
- See text

= Eremalche =

Genus of flowering plants

Eremalche is a genus of flowering plants in the mallow family. They are endemic to the United States desert southwest.

Species:

- Eremalche exilis - white mallow
- Eremalche parryi - Parry's mallow
- Eremalche rotundifolia - desert five-spot

The California endangered plant sometimes called Eremalche kernensis is today generally considered to be a subspecies of Parry's mallow, Eremalche parryi ssp kernensis.
