= Talantaaly Bakchiev =

Manaschi and academic

Talantaaly Bakchiev (born 1971) is a manaschi (a reciter of the Kyrgyz epic Epic of Manas), representative of the 'middle generation' (born in the Soviet period, career in the independence period), and academic. He was president of the “Manas” and Chingiz Aitmatov National Academy.

In becoming a manaschi, he stated that Sayakbay Karalaev had appeared in his calling dream, and that Shaabai Azizov was his mentor. He has performed, formerly while holding a whip, in Kyrgyzstan and in Yakutsk.

He is notable for having 'concocted an episode describing the memorial feast for Manas' and performed it at the National Manaschi Competition in Bishkek in 1999, and later defended the narrative from critical judges deeming it an invention by publishing his own variant (Manastin ashi) and discovering a predecessor, Tinibek, had performed a similar episode.

Recordings of his oral performances of episodes of the epos have been made available online by the Aigine Cultural Research Center, and the Open Society Archives. Transcriptions of the latter, audiovisual recordings made at the American University of Central Asia of variant performances narrating the birth of Manas, have been studied to reveal his in-performance composition methods that are similar to those described by Milman Parry as Oral-formulaic composition.

He has published episodes from the epos: a narrative concerning the memorial feast of the titular character Manas (Manastin ashi), and a narrative concerned with his companion, Almanbet (Almambettin jomogu). These have been analyzed in comparison with his texts produced in performance.

He authored an academic thesis on the subject of Kyrgyz epics, and the first manaschi to produce a textbook on the subject.
