= Sayakbay Karalaev =

Reciter of the epic Kyrgyz poem Manas

- Kyrgyz: Саякбай Каралаев
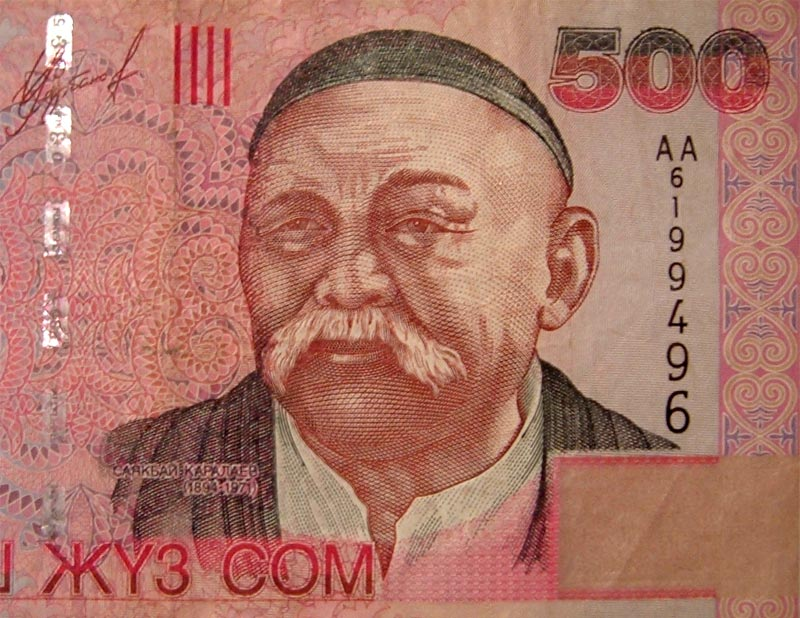
- Sayakbay Karalaev, as shown on the Kyrgyz 500 som note.
- Born: 1894; Ak-Ölöng, Semirechye Oblast, Governor-Generalship of the Steppes, Russian Empire
- Died: May 7, 1971 (aged 76-77); Frunze, Kirghiz SSR, Soviet Union
- Occupation: Poet

Sayakbay Karalaev (Kyrgyz: Саякбай Каралаев; 1894 – 7 May 1971) was a Soviet and Kyrgyz storyteller and manaschi - a reciter of the epic Kyrgyz poem Manas.

His famed variant of the Manas trilogy - Manas, his son Semetey, grandson Seitek - is said to total over 500,000 lines.

He was the first official manaschi of the Frunze Philarmonia, and received a monthly salary. His version of the Manas trilogy was collected 1936-1952.

A critical edition of his version was attempted, under the editorship of Chingiz Aitmatov in the late 1980s; later, arguably complete editions of Manas, Semetey, and Seitek appeared in the early 2010s. A CD of recorded performances appeared in 2007.

A French translation of his recitation of the epic Er Töshtük was published in 1965.

He was the subject of a biographical feature film: Sayakbay - Homer of the 20th Century (dir. Ernest Abdyjaparov).
