= Malov =

Malov is a Slavic male surname, its feminine counterpart is Malova. It may refer to

- Arkady Malov, Chuvash poet and translator.
- Oleg Malov, Russian pianist, professor at the Saint Petersburg Conservatory.
- Roman Malov (born 1977), Russian ice hockey player
- Sergey Malov (musician) (born 1983), Russian violinist and violist.
- Sergey Malov (linguist) (1880–1957), Russian turkologist
- Stoyko Malov (born 1943), Bulgarian Olympic wrestler
- Anna Malova (born c. 1972), Russian beauty queen and physician
- Anna Malova (volleyball) (born 1990), Russian volleyball player
