= Epic of Manas =

Kyrgyz traditional epic poem

- Original title: Манас дастаны
- Written: 18th century
- Language: Kyrgyz
- Subject(s): The interactions of a Kyrgyz warrior and his progeny with neighboring peoples
- Genre: Epic poem
- Lines: Approximately 553,500

The Epic of Manas (Note: Kyrgyz: Манас дастаны, romanized: Manas dastany, arabized: ماناس داستانی, IPA: [mɑnɑ́s dɑstʰɑnɯ́]) is a lengthy and traditional epic poem of the Kyrgyz people of Central Asia. Versions of the poem which date to the 19th century contain historical events of the 8th century; however, Kyrgyz tradition holds it to be much older. The plot of Manas revolves around a series of events that coincide with the history of the region—primarily the interaction of the Kyrgyz people with other neighbouring peoples.

The government of Kyrgyzstan celebrated the 1,000th anniversary from the moment it was documented in 1995. The mythic poem has evolved over many centuries, being kept alive by bards called manaschi or manaschy. The first written reference to the eponymous hero of Manas and his Oirat enemy Joloy is to be found in a Persian manuscript dated to 1792.

The Epic of Manas is the longest historical epic poem known and has been described as "the longest poem ever published". Holding the Guinness World Record for the longest epic, it is a monumental feat of oral tradition. It consists, in one of its dozens of iterations, of approximately 500,000 lines (~2 to 2.5 million words), making it roughly 20 times longer than Homer's Odyssey and Iliad combined, 2.5 to 3 times longer than the Mahabharata. The most famous version of Manas (by the bard Sayakbay Karalaev) is estimated to have over 2 million words, which still edges out the Mahabharata's 1.8 million.

== Narrative ==
The epic follows a genealogical line through eight generations of heroes—Manas, Semetey, Seytek, Kenenim, Seyit, Asylbacha-Bekbacha, Sombilek, and Chigitey—though the first three (Manas, Semetey and Seytek) have been the most frequently recorded and are the most widely recognized in Kyrgyzstan.

The epic begins with the destruction and difficulties caused by the invasion of the Oirats. Jakyp reaches maturity in this time as the owner of many herds without a single heir. His prayers are eventually answered, and on the day of his son's birth, he dedicates a colt, Toruchaar, born the same day to his son's service. The son is unique among his peers for his strength, mischief, and generosity. The Oirat learn of this young warrior and warn their leader. A plan is hatched to capture the young Manas. They fail in this task, and Manas is able to rally his people and is eventually elected and proclaimed as khan.

Manas expands his reach to include that of the Uyghurs of Raviganjn on the southern border of Jungaria. One of the defeated Uyghur rulers gives his daughter to Manas in marriage. At this point, the Kyrgyz people chose, with Manas' help, to return from the Altai mountains to their "ancestral lands" in the mountains of modern-day Kyrgyzstan. Manas begins his successful campaigns against his neighbors accompanied by his forty companions. Manas turns eventually to face the Afghan people to the south in battle, where after defeat the Afghans enter into an alliance with Manas. Manas then comes into a relationship with the people of Mā Warāʾ an-Nahr through marriage to the daughter of the ruler of Bukhara.

The epic continues in various forms, depending on the publication and whim of the manaschi, or reciter of the epic.

== History ==
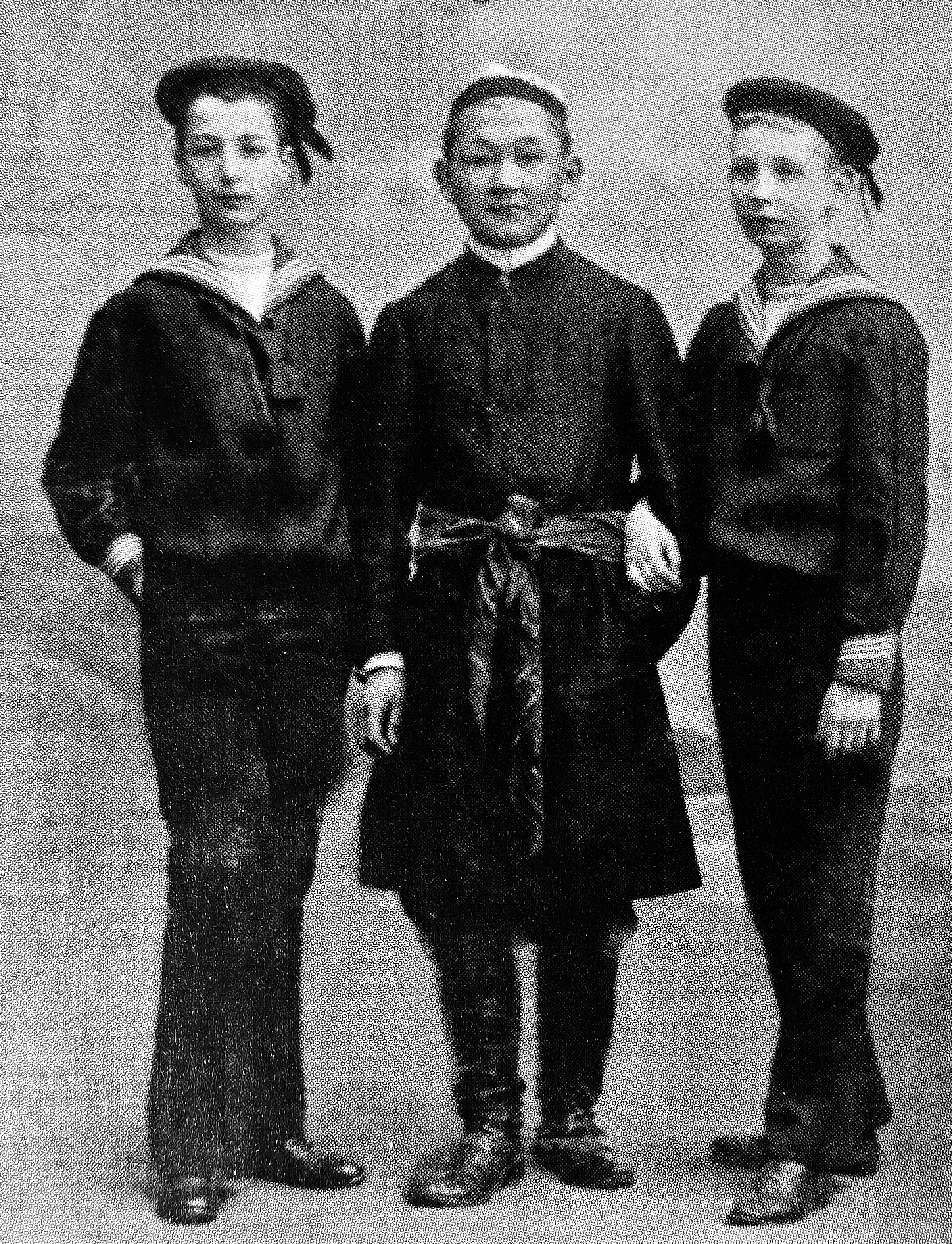
Turgan Berdike uulu (center), first Kyrgyz traveler to Hungary, translator of Manas to Hungarian

Scholars have long debated the exact age of the epic, as it was transmitted orally without being recorded. However, historians have doubted the age claimed for it since the turn of the 20th century. The primary reason is that the events portrayed occurred in the 16th and 17th centuries. Hatto remarks that Manas was "compiled to glorify the Sufi sheikhs of Shirkent and Kasan ... [and] circumstances make it highly probable that... [Manas] is a late eighteenth-century interpolation."

Changes were made in the delivery and textual representation particularly the replacement of the tribal background of Manas. In the 19th-century versions, Manas is the leader of the Nogais, while in versions dating after 1920, Manas is a Kyrgyz and a leader of the Kyrgyz. Use of the Manas for nation-building purposes, and the availability of printed historical variants, has similarly had an impact on the performance, content, and appreciation on the epic.

Attempts have been made to connect modern Kyrgyz with the Yenisei Kirghiz, today claimed by Kyrgyzstan to be the ancestors of modern Kyrgyz. Kazakh ethnographer and historian Shokan Shinghisuly Walikhanuli was unable to find evidence of folk-memory during his extended research in 19th-century Kyrgyzstan (then part of the expanding Russian empire) nor has any been found since.

== Recitation ==
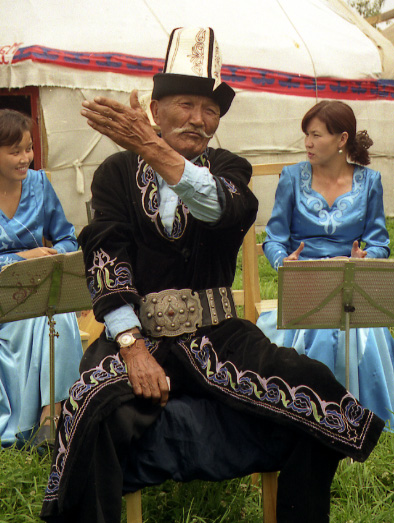
A traditional Kyrgyz manaschi performing part of the epic poem at a yurt camp in Karakol

Manas is the classic centerpiece of Kyrgyz literature, and parts of it are often recited at Kyrgyz festivities by specialists in the epic, called manaschi or manaschy (Kyrgyz: манасчы), which tell the tale in a melodic chant unaccompanied by musical instruments.

Narrators who know all three episodes of the epic (the tales of Manas, of his son Semetey and of his grandson Seytek) can acquire the status of Great Manaschy. These included Sagymbai Orozbak uulu, Sayakbay Karalaev, Shaabai Azizov (pictured), Kaba Atabekov, Seidene Moldokova, Eshmat Mambetjusup, Jusubakun Apay and Jusup Mamay of the 20th century. Contemporary ones include Rysbek Jumabayev, who has performed at the British Library; Urkash Mambetaliev, the manaschy of the Bishkek Philharmonic; Talantaaly Bakchiev, who combines recitation with critical study; and Doolot Sydykov, noted for lengthy performances (including a 111-hour recitation over five days). Adil Jumaturdu has provided "A comparative study of performers of the Manas epic."

There are more than 65 written versions of parts of the epic. Arthur Thomas Hatto made scholarly editions with facing English translations of the Manas tales recorded in the 19th century by Shokan Valikhanov and Vasily Radlov. Kyrgyz scholar Kambaraly Botoyarov (1944–1994) further researched the Arabic-script Kyrgyz text recorded by a Kazakh scribe who helped Shoqan Walikhanov.

An English translation of the version of Sagymbai Orozbakov by Walter May was published in 1995 as part of the commemoration of the presumed 1,000th anniversary of Manas' birth (and re-issued in two volumes in 2004), and a substantial episode of this variant translated by Daniel Prior was published in 2022.

The earliest sound recording was made in 1902 and 1903 of a performance of a narrative concerning Semetey by Kenje Kara.

== Legacy ==
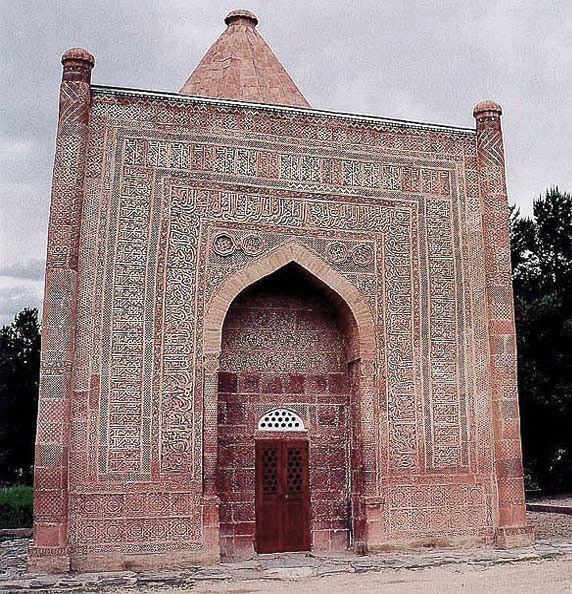
The alleged mausoleum of the eponymous hero of Manas

Manas is said to have been buried in the Ala-Too mountains in Talas Province, in northwestern Kyrgyzstan. A mausoleum some 40 km east of the town of Talas is believed to house his remains and is a popular destination for Kyrgyz travellers. Traditional Kyrgyz horsemanship games are held there every summer since 1995. An inscription on the mausoleum states, however, that it is dedicated to "...the most famous of women, Kenizek-Khatun, the daughter of the emir Abuka". Legend has it that Kanikey, Manas' widow, ordered this inscription in an effort to confuse her husband's enemies and prevent a defiling of his grave. The name of the building is "Manastin Khumbuzu" or "The Dome of Manas", and the date of its erection is unknown. There is a museum dedicated to Manas and his legend nearby the tomb.

The reception of the poem in the USSR was problematic. Politician and government official Kasym Tynystanov tried to get the poem published in 1925, but this was prevented by the growing influence of Stalinism. The first extract of the poem to be published in the USSR appeared in Moscow in 1946, and efforts to nominate the poem for the Stalin Prize in 1946 were unsuccessful. Ideologist Andrei Zhdanov, Stalin's "propagandist in chief", prevented this, calling the poem an example of "bourgeois cosmopolitanism". The struggle continued inside Kyrgyzstan, with different newspapers and authors taking different sides; one of its supporters was Tugolbay Sydykbekov. By 1952 the poem was called anti-Soviet and anti-Chinese and condemned as pan-Islamic. Chinghiz Aitmatov, in the 1980s, picked up the cause for the poem again, and in 1985 finally a statue for the hero was erected.

In 2023, the manuscript version of the epic was included by international organization UNESCO in the Memory of the World Programme through Kyrgyzstan.

== Influence ==
- Liz Williams' Nine Layers of Sky (2003) writes a modern day account of Manas as a nemesis of the Bogatyr Ilya Muromets
- University of Manas – the name of university in the city of Bishkek
- The main international airport of Kyrgyzstan, Manas International Airport in Bishkek, was named after the epic
- A minor planet, 3349 Manas was discovered by Soviet astronomer Nikolai Stepanovich Chernykh in 1979
- The highest award in Kyrgyzstan is the Order of Manas
- Manas – opera, composed by Abdylas Maldybaev

== Translations ==
Manas has been translated into 20 languages. The Uzbek poet Mirtemir translated the poem into Uzbek.

== See also ==
- Manasology
- Music of Kyrgyzstan

== External literature ==
- Manas. Translated by Walter May. Rarity, Bishkek, 2004. ISBN 9967-424-17-6
- Levin, Theodore. Where the Rivers and Mountains Sing: sound, music, and nomadism in Tuva and beyond. Section "The Spirit of Manas", pp. 188–198. Bloomington: Indiana University Press, 2006
- Manas 1000. Theses of the international scientific symposium devoted to the 'Manas' epos Millenial [sic] Anniversary. Bishkek, 1995.
- S. Mussayev. The Epos Manas. Bishkek, 1994
- Traditions of Heroic and Epic Poetry (2 vols.), under the general editorship of A. T. Hatto, The Modern Humanities Research Association, London, 1980.
- The Memorial Feast for Kokotoy-Khan, A. T. Hatto, 1977, Oxford University Press
- The Manas of Wilhelm Radloff, A. T. Hatto, 1990, Otto Harrassowitz
- Spirited Performance. The Manas Epic and Society in Kyrgyzstan. N. van der Heide, Amsterdam, 2008.
- Van der Heide, Nienke. "Epic as Arena: Models of Statehood and the Kyrgyz Manas Epic." Epic Adventures, edited by JanJansen and Henk M. J. Maier, (2004)65-70. LIT Verlag.
- Jumaturdu, Adil. Manaschï: The Singer of the Kirghiz Epic Manas. Palgrave Macmillan, 2025.
