= Independence Day (Kyrgyzstan) =

Public holiday in Kyrgyzstan

Independence Day Kyrgyz: Эгемендүүлүк күнү
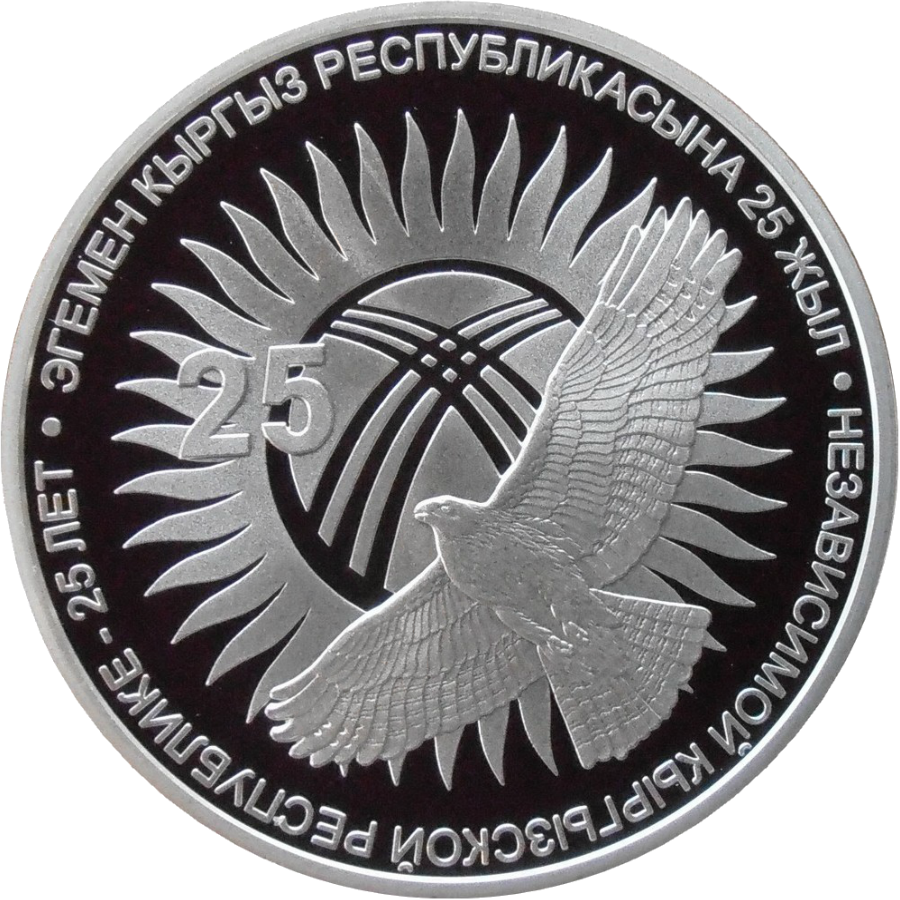
- A commemorative coin in honor of the 25th anniversary of independence.
- Observed by: Kyrgyzstan
- Type: State
- Significance: The day the Declaration of Independence was adopted by the Supreme Soviet of the Kyrgyz SSR in 1991.
- Celebrations: Fireworks, Concerts, Parades
- Date: August 31
- Next time: 31 August 2026
- Frequency: annual

The Independence Day of Kyrgyzstan (Kyrgyz: Кыргыз Республикасынын көз карандысыздыгынын күнү, Russian: День Независимости Кыргызстана) is the main state holiday in Kyrgyzstan. It is celebrated in Kyrgyzstan annually on August 31, the anniversary of its declaration of independence in 1991.

== History ==
On August 31, 1991, the Supreme Council of the Republic of Kyrgyzstan adopted a law on the "Declaration on State Independence of the Republic of Kyrgyzstan". Because of this, the Kyrgyz Republic was declared an independent state. Kyrgyzstan officially adhered to the principles of international law, and cooperation between peoples. In 1993, the first constitution was adopted, which has changed several times in 20 years. In the years since independence, Kyrgyzstan has had two revolutions, each putting the first two Presidents of Kyrgyzstan in exile in Russia and Belarus respectively.

== General events ==
Annually, a mass cultural event is held on Ala-Too Square, which is attended by thousands of spectators as well as high ranking politicians. It is held in the presence of the President of Kyrgyzstan, Prime Minister, Speaker of the Supreme Council, and Mayor of Bishkek as well as other politicians from the Supreme Council and former presidents and prime ministers. Normally, a theatrical prologue of historical figures who contributed to the establishment of Kyrgyz statehood is shown. The president usually delivers a speech to those present after the entrance of the national colours (the Flag of Kyrgyzstan) and the performance of the Mamlekettik Gimni (National Anthem) by a choir and symphonic orchestra. Kyrgyz pop stars as well as traditional dance ensembles perform during this event.

== Hosting cities ==
Under President Sadyr Japarov, the main Independence Day celebrations have moved away from Bishkek to different regional centers every year, as a way to boost local infrastructure as well as put a national spotlight on a different region and culture each year.

=== List of Kyrgyz cities hosting celebrations ===
Year	City	Region	Notes
2022	Chunkurchak Gorge	Chüy Region	
2023	Osh	Osh Region	
2024	Bishkek	Chüy Region	Celebrating the centennial of the Kara-Kirghiz Autonomous Oblast.
2025	Jalal-Abad (now Manas)	Jalal-Abad Region	
2026	Talas	Talas Region	Official celebrations will take place on 11-12 September due to the Shanghai Cooperation Organisation summit from 31 August to 1 September and the World Nomad Games from 31 August to 6 September.

== Bishkek military parade ==
A military parade on August 31 is held every 5 years in Bishkek on Ala-Too Square in honor of Independence Day. Smaller military parades are also held in other cities in Kyrgyzstan (such as Osh, and Jalal-Abad).

The parade commander gives the order to commence the parade of the Bishkek Garrison at 10:00 am. The Minister of Defense (or on some occasions the Chief of the General Staff) arrives on the square and is greeted by the parade commander (usually the Bishkek Garrison commander), who informs the minister that the parade is now ready for inspection. The minister then inspects the troops on the square in the following manner:

Minister: Hello Comrades of the (states formation's name)
Formation: Greetings Comrade Minister of Defence!
Minister: Congratulations on the occasion of the anniversary of the independence of the Kyrgyz Republic!

After he inspects the troops and disembarks from the vehicle and reports to the President of Kyrgyzstan in their position as Commander in Chief on the status of the parade. After this is done, the president delivers an address on the holiday. After the speech, the Mamlekettik Gimni (National Anthem) is performed by the Band of the General Staff of the Armed Forces of Kyrgyzstan. After the performance of the national anthem, the commander of the parade gives the command to begin the parade. The parade formations and military equipment of the Armed Forces of the Republic of Kyrgyzstan then march on the square, saluting to their Commander in Chief as they march past the central tribune.

=== List of parades ===
Year	President of Kyrgyzstan	Parade commander	Parade inspector	Notes
1992	Askar Akayev			Celebrated the 1st anniversary of independence.
1996	Askar Akayev	Colonel Esen Topoev	Colonel General Myrzakan Subanov	Celebrated the 5th anniversary of independence.
2001	Askar Akayev		Army General Esen Topoev	Celebrated the 10th anniversary of independence.
2005	Kurmanbek Bakiyev		Lieutenant General Ismail Isakov	Celebrated the 14th anniversary of independence.
2006	Kurmanbek Bakiyev	Major General Boris Yugai	Lieutenant General Ismail Isakov	Celebrated the 15th anniversary of independence.
2011	Roza Otunbayeva	Colonel Taalaibek Omuraliev	Major General Abibilla Kudayberdiev	Celebrated the 20th anniversary of independence. 1,700 soldiers participated in some form, which costed the government around 18 million Kyrgyzstani soms ($258,235 USD). According to President Almazbek Atambayev, some of the vehicles supposed to go on parade "didn't even reach the square", which he said inspired his military reform a year later.
2016	Almazbek Atambayev	Colonel Baktybek Bekbolotov	Major General Rayimberdi Duishenbiev	Celebrated the 25th anniversary of independence. It was attended by President Almazbek Atambayev, Prime Minister Sooronbay Jeenbekov, Parliament Speaker Chynybai Tursunbekov, Mayor of Bishkek Albek Ibraimov, and former president Roza Otunbayeva. The parade involved more than 1,000 troops and 80 pieces of equipment.
2021	Sadyr Japarov	Colonel Almazbek Karasartov	Major General Taalaibek Omuraliev	Celebrated the 30th anniversary of independence.

== Other events ==
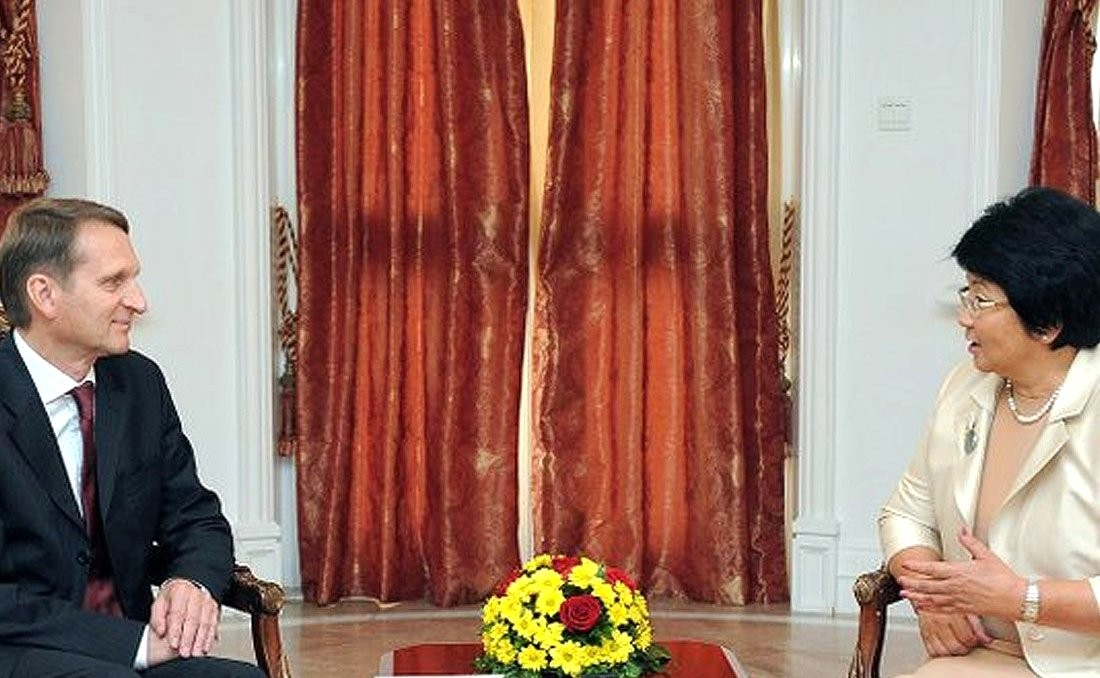
President Roza Otunbayeva meeting with Kremlin Chief of Staff Sergei Naryshkin during his working visit to Bishkek on Independence Day in 2011.

Other events are sometimes timed to coincide with the celebration of Independence Day. In 2019, an equestrian games in the Issyk-Kul Region took place on the days leading up to Independence Day. Sporting events such as soccer games, swimming competitions and traditional mass games are also held. In 2012, President Almazbek Atambayev attended the opening ceremony of a larger flagpole with the State Flag on Boz-Boltok Mountain in Alamüdün, a town and northern suburb of Bishkek in the Chuy Region. The year before, a statue of Manas was installed on Ala-Too Square.

The 29th anniversary celebrations in 2020 were celebrated online due to the COVID-19 pandemic. Earlier that May, MP Zhanar Akayev proposed the idea to celebrate the 30th anniversary of Kyrgyzstan's independence in Batken at a meeting of the Jogorku Kenesh, citing it as a reason for the development of domestic tourism. The Commonwealth of Independent States Youth Symphony Orchestra performed at the concert event in 2021.

== Controversies ==
- In 2016, on the eve of Independence Day, the Chinese Embassy in Bishkek was bombed by a lone suicide bomber driving his car through the gates of the embassy. The driver of the car was killed while three embassy employees were injured. The bomber was believed to be part of the Uyghur ethnic group who primarily live in the Chinese province of Xinjiang.
- During a speech by her President Atambayev at on Independence Day in 2016, his predecessor Roza Otunbayeva walked off the stage after Atambayev repeatedly criticized her government, saying: "If you have already forgotten Roza Isakovna [Otunbayeva], then we well remember, what chaos there was after the adoption of the new constitution.

== See also ==
- Constitution of Kyrgyzstan
- List of independence days
- Public holidays in Kyrgyzstan
- Kyrgyz Republic commemorative currency

== Videos ==
- Бишкек, 31-август. 2011 ж. Ала-Тоо
- Таберик: 20-летие независимости Кыргызстана, парад на площади 2011
- Военный парад в Бишкеке (2011) - Military parade in Bishkek (2011)
- Праздничный парад к 25-летию независимости КР
- Посол США делает юрту
- Таберик: "Самба" 2000 год, день независимости Кыргызстана
- Празднование 10 летия независимости КР
- Празднование 25-летия независимости Кыргызстана
- Жээнбеков в День независимости призвал вместе построить процветающий Кыргызстан
