= List of Kyrgyz flags =

This is a list of flags used in Kyrgyzstan.

== National flag and state flag ==
| Flag | Date | Use | Description |
|---|---|---|---|
| | 2023–present | Flag of Kyrgyzstan | |

== Governmental flags ==
| Flag | Date | Use | Description |
|---|---|---|---|
| | 1992–present | Presidential standard | |
| | 1992–present | Local government flag | |

== Military flags ==
| Flag | Date | Use | Description |
|---|---|---|---|
| | 1992–present | Flag of the Border Guard Service (obverse) | |
| | 1992–present | Flag of the Border Guard Service (reverse) | |
| | 1992–present | Flag of Kyrgyz Armed Forces (Kyrgyz) | |
| | 1992–present | Flag of Kyrgyz Armed Forces (Russian) | |

== Regional flags ==
| Flag | Date | Use | Description |
|---|---|---|---|
| | 1999–present | Flag of Batken | |
| | 1992–present | Flag of Bishkek (independent city) | |
| | 1992–present | Flag of Chüy | |
| | 1992–present | Flag of Jalal-Abad | |
| | 1992–present | Flag of Issyk-Kul | |
| | 1992–present | Flag of Naryn | |
| | 1992–present | Flag of Osh | |
| | 1992–present | Flag of Talas | |

== Political flags ==
| Flag | Date | Party | Description |
Current
| | 2015–present | Kyrgyzstan | |
| | 2006–present | United Kyrgyzstan | |
| | 2005–present | Birimdik | |
| | 1992–present | Party of Communists of Kyrgyzstan | |
Former
| | 2014–2017 | Respublika–Ata Zhurt | |
| | 2010–2021 | Bir Bol | |
| | 2003–2005 | Forward Kyrgyzstan Party | |

== Historical flags ==
=== Chagatai Khanate (1294–1347 and 1361–1363) ===
| Flag | Date | Use | Description |
|---|---|---|---|
| | 1294–1347; 1361–1363 | Flag of the Chagatai Khanate | |

=== Golden Horde (1294–1446) ===
| Flag | Date | Use | Description |
|---|---|---|---|
| | 1294–1446 | Flag of the Golden Horde | |

=== Timurid Empire (1370–1507) ===
| Flag | Date | Use | Description |
|---|---|---|---|
| | 1370–1507 | Banner of Tamerlane | |

=== Emirate of Bukhara (1785–1870) ===
| Flag | Date | Use | Description |
|---|---|---|---|
| | 1785–1870 | Flag of the Emirate of Bukhara | |

=== Russia (1870–1918) ===
| Flag | Date | Use | Description |
|---|---|---|---|
| | 1870–1896 | First official state flag of the Russian Empire | |
| | 1870–1917 | Standard of the Emperor of Russia on land | |
| | 1883–1914; 1917–1918 | Second official state flag of the Russian Empire and the first flag of the Russian Provisional Government, the later Russian Republic | |
| | 1898 | Flag used by the Kyrgyz people during the Andijan uprising of 1898 | |
| | 1916 | Flag used by the Kyrgyz people during the Central Asian revolt of 1916 in Semirechye | |
| | 1914–1917 | Flag for private use; also planned state flag | |

=== Turkestan Autonomy (1917–1918) ===
| Flag | Date | Use | Description |
|---|---|---|---|
| | 1917–1918 | Flag of the Turkestan Autonomy | |

=== Russian Soviet Republic (1918–1922) and Soviet Union (1922–1991) ===
| Flag | Date | Use | Description |
|---|---|---|---|
| | 1919–1921 | Flag of the Turkestan Autonomous Soviet Socialist Republic | |
| | 1921–1924 | Flag of the Turkestan Autonomous Soviet Socialist Republic | |
| | 1926–1936 | Flag of the Kirghiz Autonomous Socialist Soviet Republic | |
| | 1936–1940 | Flag of the Kirghiz Soviet Socialist Republic | |
| | 1936–1940 | Flag of the Kirghiz Soviet Socialist Republic (variant) | |
| | 1940–1952 | Flag of the Kirghiz Soviet Socialist Republic | |
| | 1952–1991 | Flag of the Kirghiz Soviet Socialist Republic | |
| | 1991–1992 | Flag of Kyrgyzstan after the fall of the Soviet Union | |
| | 1992–2023 | Flag of Kyrgyzstan | |

== Proposed flags ==
| Flag | Date | Use | Description |
|---|---|---|---|
| | 2011 | Proposal 1 | |
| | 2011 | Proposal 2 | |
| | 2011 | Proposal 3 | |
| | 2011 | Proposal 4 | |
| | 2011 | Proposal 5 | |

== See also ==
- Flag of Kyrgyzstan
- Emblem of Kyrgyzstan
