= State Anthem of the Kyrgyz Republic =

Kyrgyz Respublikasynyn Mamlekettik gimni
English: State Anthem of the Kyrgyz Republic
- Кыргыз Республикасынын Мамлекеттик гимни
- Sheet music
- National anthem of Kyrgyzstan
- Lyrics: Jalil Sadykov, Shabdanbek Kuluyev, 1992
- Music: Nasyr Davlesov, Kalyi Moldobasanov, 1992
- Adopted: 18 December 1992
- Preceded by: Anthem of the Kirghiz Soviet Socialist Republic

Audio sample
- Official orchestral and choral instrumental recording: file; help

Official orchestral instrumental recording

U.S. Navy Band instrumental version

The State Anthem of the Kyrgyz Republic (Note: Kyrgyz: Кыргыз Республикасынын Мамлекеттик гимни, romanized: Kyrgyz Respublikasynyn Mamlekettik gimni) was adopted on 18 December 1992 by a resolution of the Supreme Council of Kyrgyzstan. The music was composed by Nasyr Davlesov and Kalyi Moldobasanov, and the words were written by Jalil Sadykov and Shabdanbek Kuluyev.

Initially, the anthem consisted of three verses and a chorus; however, by the resolution of the Supreme Council of the Kyrgyz Republic N 2648-V of 27 December 2012, the second verse was excluded.

== History ==
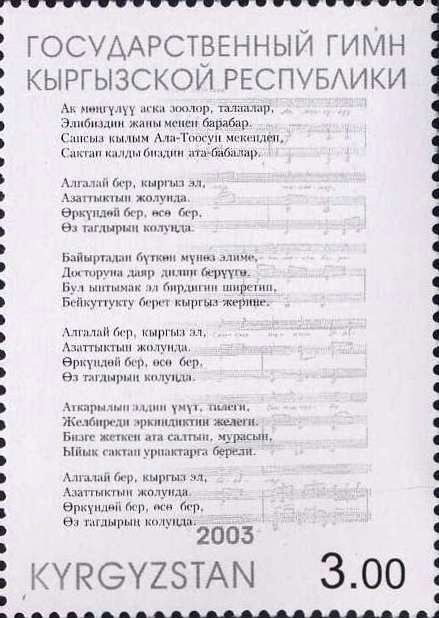
The national anthem on a 2003 Kyrgyz stamp

Written by Jalil Sadykov and Shabdanbek Kuluyev and composed by Nasyr Davlesov and Kalyi Moldobasanov, the anthem was adopted on 18 December 1992 by a resolution of the Supreme Council.

In the 2000s, several public figures began initiatives to change the lyrics of the anthem. They considered the meaning of the word in the second stanza, beikuttuk ('serenity, calmness'), to be contradictory, with the negative prefix bei- giving the word kut ('happiness, luck, grace') the opposite meaning. Thus, the following verse was omitted:

Байыртадан бүткөн мүнөз элиме,
Досторуна даяр дилин берүүгө.
Бул ынтымак эл бирдигин ширетип,
Бейкуттукту берет кыргыз жерине.

For ages our people open to amity,
And are fain to give their hearts to their very friends.
This concord shall strengthen the people's unity,
And bring everlasting peace to the Kyrgyz land.

In 2011, the Supreme Council set up a commission to change the lyrics of the national anthem and the flag, which had also been under dispute over the use of red and the flaming sun. The flag would not be changed, but after considering many proposals for changes to the lyrics or a new second verse, the commission, headed by Abdyrahman Mamataliev, concluded to remove the verse entirely, stating there were generally contradictions in it. The Jogorku Kengesh voted in favour of the commission's proposal on 27 December 2012 with resolution N 2648-V.

In 2025, the government launched a public contest to replace the anthem, saying that it fails to accurately represent and depict the country's ancient and nomadic past.

== Lyrics ==
Official Kyrgyz lyrics

Ак мөңгүлүү аска, зоолор, талаалар,
Элибиздин жаны менен барабар.
Сансыз кылым Ала-Тоосун мекендеп,
Сактап келди биздин ата-бабалар.

Кайырма:
Алгалай бер, кыргыз эл,
Азаттыктын жолунда.
Өркүндөй бер, өсө бер,
Өз тагдырың колуңда.

Аткарылып элдин үмүт тилеги,
Желбиреди эркиндиктин желеги.
Бизге жеткен ата салтын, мурасын,
Ыйык сактап урпактарга берели.

Кайырма

Kyrgyz Arabic script

اق مۅڭگۉلۉۉ اسقا، زوولور، تالاالار،
ەلىبىزدىن جانى مەنەن بارابار.
سانسىز قىلىم الا-تووسۇن مەكەندەپ،
ساقتاپ كەلدى بئزدىن اتا-بابالار.

قايىرما:
العالاي بەر، قىرعىز ەل،
ازاتتىقتىن جولۇندا.
ۅركۉندۅي بەر، ۅسۅ بەر،
ۅز تاعدىرىڭ قولۇڭدا.

اتقارىلىپ ەلدىن ۉمۉت تىلەگى،
جەلبىرەدى ەركىندىكتىن جەلەگى.
بىزگە جەتكەن اتا سالتىن، مۇراسىن،
ىيىق ساقتاپ ۇرپاقتارعا بەرەلى.

قايىرما

Romanization of Kyrgyz

Ak moñgülüü aska zoolor, talaalar,
Elibizdin jany menen barabar.
Sansyz kylym Ala-Toosun mekendep,
Saktap keldi bizdin ata-babalar.

Kaiyrma:
Algalai ber, kyrgyz el,
Azattyktyn jolunda.
Örkündöi ber, ösö ber,
Öz tagdyryñ koluñda.

Atkarylyp eldin ümüt, tilegi,
Jelbiredi erkindiktin jelegi.
Bizge jetken ata saltyn, murasyn,
Yiyk saktap urpaktarga bereli.

Kaiyrma

IPA transcription (Note: See Help:IPA/Kyrgyz and Kyrgyz phonology.)

[ɑq mɵŋ.ɡʏˈlyː ɑsˈqɑ zoːˈɫoɾ tɑ.ɫɑːˈɫɑɾ |]
[eˌlɪ.bɪzˈdɪn dʑɑˈnɯ meˈnen bɑ.ɾɑˈbɑɾ ‖]
[sɑnˈsɯz qɯˈɫɯm ɑˌɫɑ.toːˈsʊn me.kenˈdep |]
[sɑqˈtɑp kelˈdɪ bɪzˈdɪn ɑˈtɑ bɑ.bɑˈɫɑɾ ‖]

[qɑ.jɯɾˈmɑ]
[ɑɫ.ʁɑˈɫɑj beɾ qɯɾˈʁɯz el |]
[ɑˌzɑt.tɯqˈtɯn dʑo.ɫʊnˈdɑ ‖]
[ɵɾ.kʏnˈdɵj beɾ ɵˈsɵ beɾ |]
[ɵz tɑɢ.dɯˈɾɯŋ | qo.ɫʊŋˈdɑ ‖]

[ɑtˌqɑ.ɾɯˈɫɯp elˈdɪn ʏˈmʏt tɪ.leˈɣɪ |]
[dʑelˌbɪ.ɾeˈdɪ eɾˌkɪn.dɪkˈtɪn dʑe.leˈɣɪ ‖]
[bɪzˈɡe dʑetˈken ɑˈtɑ sɑɫˈtɯn mʊ.ɾɑˈsɯn |]
[ɯˈjɯq sɑqˈtɑp ʊɾˌpɑq.tɑɾˈʁɑ be.ɾeˈlɪ ‖]

[qɑ.jɯɾˈmɑ]

English translation

Land of snow-capped mountains, steppes and valleys,
Which are equal to the souls of our folks.
For countless generations our forefathers
Have lived in and protected the Ala-Too.

Chorus:
March on, O Kyrgyz folk,
Onward to democracy!
Progress and prosperity …
In your hands lies your destiny!

Our hopes and aspirations have been fulfilled,
And the flag of freedom is soaring over us.
Let us preserve our heritage and traditions,
And pass them on to our descendants.

Chorus

Russian translation

Высокие горы, долины, поля -
Родная, заветная наша земля.
Отцы наши жили среди Ала-Тоо
Всегда свою родину свято храня.

Припев:
Вперёд, киргизский народ,
Путём свободы вперёд!
Взрастай, народ, расцветай,
Свою судьбу созидай!

Мечты и надежды отцов сбылись.
И знамя свободы возносится ввысь.
Наследье отцов наших передадим
На благо народа потомкам своим

Припев

== Protocol ==
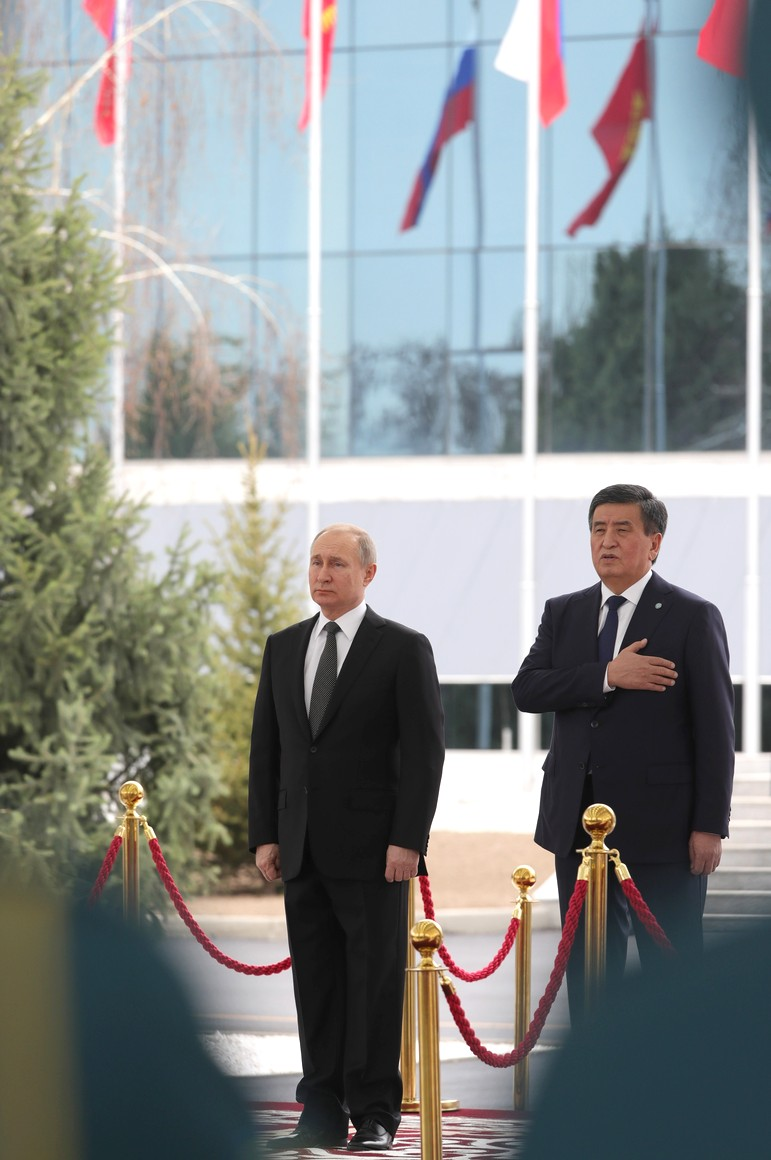
President Sooronbay Jeenbekov putting his hand over his heart during the playing of the anthem, with Vladimir Putin standing beside him listening along.

When the anthem is being performed at official ceremonies and social functions, the protocol is to put the hands over their heart if one is a civilian, which follows the American example for the playing of "The Star-Spangled Banner". When in formation, officers of the Armed Forces of Kyrgyzstan perform a Russian-style salute while enlisted personnel present arms with whatever weapon they might have in hand, outside of formation, all personnel salute.

== See also ==
- Emblem of Kyrgyzstan
- Flag of Kyrgyzstan
- Geography of Kyrgyzstan
- Anthem of the Kirghiz Soviet Socialist Republic, the previous anthem
