= Kyrgyz Republic commemorative currency =

Commemorative currency in the Kyrgyz Republic is the set of commemorative banknotes and coins, issued by the National Bank of the Kyrgyz Republic, that are not meant for general circulation.

All the banknotes and coins are either denoted by som, the underlined C, or its subunit the tyiyn.

Kyrgyz is the language used on the commemorative currencies, although Russian, and to a lesser extent English, is used in conjunction as well.

== Issuing of Commemorative Currencies ==
The central bank regularly issues commemorative currencies to mark various occasions, or to celebrate the various aspects of Kyrgyzstani culture or wildlife.

Several of these have also won numerous regional and international awards.

== Production of Commemorative Currencies ==
Commemorative coins are minted in several locations including, Kazakhstan, Lithuania, Poland, Russia (Saint Petersburg Mint), Slovakia, and the United Kingdom (Pobjoy Mint), while the commemorative notes are printed in the United States (Crane Currency).

== History ==
On 11 August 1995, the central bank issued its first collectible coins to celebrate the 1000th anniversary of the Epic of Manas, despite coins not being in general circulation at that time. Since then, over the years, the central bank has increased the frequency of issuance of commemorative currencies.

The central bank reached its first major milestone when it received its first award on the 1st of December 2010.

The commemorative coins of the 2009 "Works of Chinghiz Aitmatov" series won an Honorary Diploma from the "Biblio-Globus" Trading House during the fourth international commemorative coin competition.

In 2017, the first commemorative banknote was issued. This banknote was also the first vertically oriented Kyrgyz banknote that had incorporated several state of the art security features, although machines were not calibrated to accept these notes.

In 2018 with the introduction of the new som symbol to mark 25 years of issuing the national currency, new commemorative currencies started featuring the symbol as well.

== Commemorative coins ==
Commemorative coins
Image		Value	Technical parameters			Description		Date of issue	Issue quantity	Issue quality
Obverse	Reverse	Value	Diameter	Mass	Composition	Obverse	Reverse	Date of issue	Issue quantity	Issue quality
KG-1995-100som-Manas-a	KG-1995-100som-Manas-b	100 som	22.00mm	6.22g	Gold 999	Manas overlaid on "Айкөл Манас" (Magnanimous Manas)	Emblem of Kyrgyzstan, year	11 August 1995	1000	proof
KG-1995-10som-Manas-a	KG-1995-10som-Manas-b	10 som	38.60mm	28.28g	Silver 925	Manas overlaid on "Манас эпосуна миң жыл" (Epic of Manas one thousandth year)	Emblem of Kyrgyzstan, year	11 August 1995	5000	
KG-2000-100som-Osh-a	KG-2000-100som-Osh-b	100 som	22.00mm	7.78g	Gold 916	Ferghana horses painted with Sulayman Mountain background, "Ош- үч миң жыл" (City of Osh- third millennium)	Emblem of Kyrgyzstan, year	28 August 2000	1000	
KG Ag Han-Tengri a	KG Ag Han-Tengri b	10 som	38.60mm	28.28g	Silver 925	Khan Tengri Mountain	Emblem of Kyrgyzstan, Эгемен Кыргыз Республикасына 10 жыл (10 years of independent Kyrgyz Republic), year	27 August 2001	1000	
KG Ag Arhar a	KG Ag Arhar b	10 som	38.60mm	28.28g	Silver 925	Ovis Ammon Karelini "Аркар" against Tian Shan "Теңир-Тоо" mountains	Emblem of Kyrgyzstan, Эл аралык тоо жылы (International Year of Mountains), year	26 August 2002	1000	
KG Ag Edelveis a	KG Ag Edelveis b	10 som	38.60mm	28.28g	Silver 925	Leontopodium "Акмаңдай" against Tian Shan "Теңир-Тоо" mountains	Emblem of Kyrgyzstan, Эл аралык тоо жылы (International Year of Mountains), year	26 August 2002	1000	
KG Ag Valuta a	KG Ag Valuta b	10 som	38.60mm	28.28g	Silver 925/ Gold 999	All commemorative coins issued during the past 10 years surrounding a "tunduk"	Emblem of Kyrgyzstan, Улуттук валютага 10 жыл (10 years of national currency), year	8 May 2003	1000	
KG Ag gosud a	KG Ag gosud b	10 som	38.60mm	28.28g	Silver 925/ Gold 999	Tiger head decoration, Turgesh coin, Burana Tower and state flag surrounding a "tunduk" (counter clockwise from top left)	Emblem of Kyrgyzstan, Кыргыз мамлекеттүүлүгүнө 2200 жыл (2200 Years of Kyrgyz statehood), year	8 May 2003	1000	
KG Ag Voina a	KG Ag Voina b	10 som	38.60mm	28.28g	Silver 925	A woman and eternal flame at Victory Memorial Complex, Улуу Жеңишке 60 жыл/ 60 лет Великой Победе (60th Anniversary of Great Victory)	Emblem of Kyrgyzstan, year	4 May 2005	1000	
KG Ag Tashrabat a	KG Ag Tashrabat b	10 som	38.60mm	28.28g	Silver 925/ Gold 999	Map of Kyrgyz Republic, Tash Rabat "Ташрабат"	Emblem of Kyrgyzstan, Кыргызстан Улуу жибек жолунда (Kyrgyzstan on the Great Silk Road), year	4 May 2005	1500	
KG Ag Uzgen a	KG Ag Uzgen b	10 som	38.60mm	28.28g	Silver 925/ Gold 999	Map of Kyrgyz Republic, Uzgen architecture complex "Өзгөн архитектуралык эстеликтери"	Emblem of Kyrgyzstan, Кыргызстан Улуу жибек жолунда (Kyrgyzstan on the Great Silk Road), year	2 April 2007	1500	
KG-2007-10som-SCO-a	KG-2007-10som-SCO-b	10 som	38.60mm	28.28g	Silver 925	Emblem of Shanghai Cooperation Organisation "Кызматташуунун Шанхай уюму" over a "tunduk"	Emblem of Kyrgyzstan, year	2 April 2007	1000	
		1 tyiyn	14.00mm	1.00g	Brass-plated steel	1 Тыйын (tyiyn), flower (гүл/ gul)	Emblem of Kyrgyzstan, year	1 January 2008	100000	brilliant uncirculated
KG Ag Bishkek a	KG Ag Bishkek b	10 som	38.60mm	31.10g	Silver 925	Emblem of Eurasian Economic Community overlaid on Bishkek "Бишкек" city view, "Столицы стран ЕврАзЭС" (EurAsEC)	Emblem of Kyrgyzstan, ЕврАзЭС өлкөлөрүнүн борборлору (EurAsEC), year	18 December 2008	2500	proof
KG Ag Burana a	KG Ag Burana b	10 som	38.60mm	28.28g	Silver 925/ Gold 999	Map of Kyrgyz Republic, Burana Tower "Бурана"	Emblem of Kyrgyzstan, Кыргызстан Улуу жибек жолунда (Kyrgyzstan on the Great Silk Road), year	18 December 2008	1500	proof
KG CuNi Burana a	KG CuNi all 2008	1 som	30.00mm	12.00g	Copper-Nickel	Map of Kyrgyz Republic, Burana Tower "Бурана"	Emblem of Kyrgyzstan, Кыргызстан Улуу жибек жолунда (Kyrgyzstan on the Great Silk Road), year	18 December 2008	5000	brilliant uncirculated
KG CuNi Tashrabat a	KG CuNi all 2008	1 som	30.00mm	12.00g	Copper-Nickel	Map of Kyrgyz Republic, Tash Rabat "Ташрабат"	Emblem of Kyrgyzstan, Кыргызстан Улуу жибек жолунда (Kyrgyzstan on the Great Silk Road), year	18 December 2008	5000	brilliant uncirculated
KG CuNi Uzgen a	KG CuNi all 2008	1 som	30.00mm	12.00g	Copper-Nickel	Map of Kyrgyz Republic, Uzgen architecture complex "Өзгөн архитектуралык эстеликтери"	Emblem of Kyrgyzstan, Кыргызстан Улуу жибек жолунда (Kyrgyzstan on the Great Silk Road), year	18 December 2008	5000	brilliant uncirculated
KG Ag Sulayman-Too a	KG Ag Issyk-Kul Sulayman-Too b	10 som	38.60mm	28.28g	Silver 925/ Gold 999	Map of Kyrgyz Republic, Sulayman Mountain "Сулайман Тоо"	Emblem of Kyrgyzstan, Кыргызстан Улуу жибек жолунда (Kyrgyzstan on the Great Silk Road), year	20 April 2009	1500	proof
KG CuNi Sulayman-Too a	KG CuNi all 2009	1 som	30.00mm	12.00g	Copper-Nickel	Map of Kyrgyz Republic, Sulayman Mountain "Сулайман Тоо"	Emblem of Kyrgyzstan, Кыргызстан Улуу жибек жолунда (Kyrgyzstan on the Great Silk Road), year	20 April 2009	5000	brilliant uncirculated
KG Ag Issyk-Kul a	KG Ag Issyk-Kul Sulayman-Too b	10 som	38.60mm	28.28g	Silver 925/ Gold 999	Map of Kyrgyz Republic, Lake Issyk-Kul "Ысык-Көл"	Emblem of Kyrgyzstan, Кыргызстан Улуу жибек жолунда (Kyrgyzstan on the Great Silk Road), year	20 April 2009	1500	proof
KG CuNi Issyk-Kul a	KG CuNi all 2009	1 som	30.00mm	12.00g	Copper-Nickel	Map of Kyrgyz Republic, Lake Issyk-Kul "Ысык-Көл"	Emblem of Kyrgyzstan, Кыргызстан Улуу жибек жолунда (Kyrgyzstan on the Great Silk Road), year	20 April 2009	5000	brilliant uncirculated
KG Ag Chinghiz a	KG Ag Chinghiz b	10 som	38.60mm	28.28g	Silver 925	Chinghiz Aitmatov "Чыңгыз Айтматов"	Emblem of Kyrgyzstan, stork birds, year	4 May 2009	2000	proof
KG Ag Dzhamila a	KG Ag Chinghiz Lit	10 som	38.60mm	28.28g	Silver 925	A scene from Jamila, "Жамийла/ Джамиля"	Emblem of Kyrgyzstan, Чыңгыз Айтматов Чыгармасы/ Произведение чингиза айтматова (Chinghiz Aitmatov's works), Aitmatov's signature, year	4 May 2009	3000	proof
KG Ag Teacher a	KG Ag Chinghiz Lit	10 som	38.60mm	28.28g	Silver 925	A scene from The First Teacher, "Биринчи мугалим/ Первый учитель"	Emblem of Kyrgyzstan, Чыңгыз Айтматов Чыгармасы/ Произведение чингиза айтматова (Chinghiz Aitmatov's works), Aitmatov's signature, year	4 May 2009	3000	proof
KG Ag Pole a	KG Ag Chinghiz Lit	10 som	38.60mm	28.28g	Silver 925	A scene from Mother Earth & other stories, "Саманчынын жолу/ Материнское поле"	Emblem of Kyrgyzstan, Чыңгыз Айтматов Чыгармасы/ Произведение чингиза айтматова (Chinghiz Aitmatov's works), Aitmatov's signature, year	4 May 2009	3000	proof
KG Ag Gulsary a	KG Ag Chinghiz Lit	10 som	38.60mm	28.28g	Silver 925	A scene from Farewell, Gulsary!, "Гүлсарат/ Прощай, Гульсары!"	Emblem of Kyrgyzstan, Чыңгыз Айтматов Чыгармасы/ Произведение чингиза айтматова (Chinghiz Aitmatov's works), Aitmatov's signature, year	4 May 2009	3000	proof
KG Ag Ak-Keme a	KG Ag Chinghiz Lit	10 som	38.60mm	28.28g	Silver 925	A scene from The White Steamboat, " Ак кеме/ Белый пароход"	Emblem of Kyrgyzstan, Чыңгыз Айтматов Чыгармасы/ Произведение чингиза айтматова (Chinghiz Aitmatov's works), Aitmatov's signature, year	4 May 2009	3000	proof
KG Ag Berkut a	KG Ag Berkut b	10 som	38.60mm	31.10g	Silver 925	Golden eagle "Бүркүт/Беркут", Emblem of Eurasian Economic Community, "Животный мир стран ЕврАзЭС" (Fauna of EurAsEC)	Emblem of Kyrgyzstan, Fauna of EurAsEC "ЕврАзЭС өлкөлөрүнүн жаныбарлар дүйнөсү", year	29 October 2009	3000	proof
KG Ag Oleniha a	KG Ag Oleniha b	10 som	38.60mm	31.10g	Silver 925	Mother Deer "Бугуэне/ Мать-олениха", Emblem of Eurasian Economic Community, "Легенды и сказки народов стран ЕврАзЭС" (Legend and tales of people of EurAsEC)	Emblem of Kyrgyzstan, "ЕврАзЭС өлкөлөрүнүн элдеринин уламыштары жана жомоктору" (Legends and tales people of EurAsEC), year	29 October 2009	3000	proof
KG Ag Evrazes a	KG Ag Evrazes b	10 som	38.60mm	31.10g	Silver 925	Emblem of Eurasian Economic Community overlaid on 5 capitals of EurAsEC, "10 лет Евразийскому экономическому сообществу" (10 years of EurAsEC)	Emblem of Kyrgyzstan, "Евразия экономикалык шериктештигине 10 жыл" (10 years of EurAsEC), year	1 October 2010	2000	proof
KG Ag Tunduk a	KG Ag Tunduk b	10 som	38.60mm	31.10g	Silver 925	"Түндүк көтөрүү" Tunduk building, "Национальные обычаи и обряды народов стран ЕврАзЭС" (Customs and traditions of people of EurAsEC)	Emblem of Kyrgyzstan, Emblem of EurAsEC, "ЕврАзЭС өлкөлөрүнүн элдеринин улуттук жөрөлгөлөрү жана салт-санаалары" (Customs and traditions of people of EurAsEC), year	1 October 2010	3000	proof
KG CuNi Tengri a	KG CuNi Tengri b	1 som	30.00mm	12.00g	Copper-Nickel	Khan Tengri Mountain "Хан-Теңири"	Emblem of Kyrgyzstan, Эгемен Кыргыз Республикасына 20 жыл (20 years of independent Kyrgyz Republic), year	15 August 2011	5000	brilliant uncirculated
KG CuNi Pobedy a	KG Pobedy b	1 som	30.00mm	12.00g	Copper-Nickel	Jengish Chokusu mountain "Жеңиш чокусу/ Пик Победы"	Emblem of Kyrgyzstan, Эгемен Кыргыз Республикасына 20 жыл (20 years of independent Kyrgyz Republic), year	15 August 2011	5000	brilliant uncirculated
KG Ag Pobedy a	KG Pobedy b	10 som	38.60mm	28.28g	Silver 925	Jengish Chokusu mountain "Жеңиш чокусу/ Пик Победы"	Emblem of Kyrgyzstan, Эгемен Кыргыз Республикасына 20 жыл (20 years of independent Kyrgyz Republic), year	15 August 2011	3000	proof
KG Ag Kyrg a	KG Ag Kyrg b	10 som	38.60mm	28.28g	Silver 925/ Gold 999	Flag of Kyrgyz Republic, Manas overlaid on map of Kyrgyz Republic, Эгемен Кыргыз Республикасына 20 жыл (20 years of independent Kyrgyz Republic)	Emblem of Kyrgyzstan, Независимой кыргызской республике 20 лет (20 years of independent Kyrgyz Republic), year	15 August 2011	2000	proof
KG Ag Mir a	KG Ag Mir b	10 som	39.00mm	33.94g	Silver 925	Children's drawing, "Мир наших детей" (The world of our children)	Emblem of Kyrgyzstan, Emblem of EurAsEC, "Аруулук уялаган балдар дүйнөсү" (Children's drawing), year	20 December 2011	3000	proof
KG Ag Sh a	KG Ag Sh b	10 som	38.61mm	31.10g	Silver 925/ Gold 999	Emblem of EurAsEC, map of Silk Road, "Великий шёлковый путь" (The Great Silk Road)	Emblem of Kyrgyzstan, "Улуу Жибек Жолу" (The Great Silk Road), caravan passing through mountains, year	20 December 2011	2000	proof
KG-2012-10som-Datka-a	KG-2012-10som-Datka-b	10 som	38.60mm	28.28g	Silver 925	Kurmanjan Datka "Курманжан Датка, 1811-1907", two Swarovski crystals	Emblem of Kyrgyzstan, Kurmanjan riding a horse, "Курманжан Даткага 200 жыл" (200th anniversary of Kurmanjan Datka), year	8 August 2012	2000	proof
KG-2012-100som-Datka-a	KG-2012-10som-Datka-b	100 som	22.60mm	7.78g	Gold 999	Kurmanjan Datka "Курманжан Датка, 1811-1907"	Emblem of Kyrgyzstan, Kurmanjan riding a horse, "Курманжан Даткага 200 жыл" (200th anniversary of Kurmanjan Datka), year	8 August 2012	1000	proof
KG CuNi Komuz a	KG CuNi Komuz b	5 som	33.00mm	14.35g	Copper-Nickel	Kyrgyz playing a Komuz musical instrument, "Комуз"	Emblem of Kyrgyzstan, National musical instruments "Улуттук музыкалык аспаптар", year	21 August 2012	3000	brilliant uncirculated
KG Ag Irbis a	KG Ag Irbis b	10 som	38.60mm	28.28g	Silver 925	Snow leopard "Ак илбирс"	Emblem of Kyrgyzstan, Animals of the Red Book of Kyrgyzstan "Кыргызстандын кызыл китеби", year	21 August 2012	3000	proof
KG Ag Dzheiran a	KG Ag Dzheiran b	10 som	38.60mm	28.28g	Silver 925/ Gold 999	Goitered gazelle "Жейрен/ Gazella Subgutturosa"	Emblem of Kyrgyzstan, Animals of the Red Book of Kyrgyzstan "Кыргызстандын кызыл китеби", year	26 August 2013	3000	proof
KG-2013-10som-Saimaluu-Tash-a	KG-2013-10som-Saimaluu-Tash-b	10 som	38.60mm	28.28g	Silver 925	Rock paintings, "Саймалуу-Таш/ Saimaluu Tash"	Emblem of Kyrgyzstan, rock paintings, "Кыргызстандын тарыхый жана архитектуралык эстеликтери" (Kyrgyzstan historical and architectural monuments), year	26 August 2013	2000	proof
KG-2013-1som-Saimaluu-Tash-a	KG-2013-1som-Saimaluu-Tash-b	1 som	30.00mm	12.00g	Copper-Nickel	Rock paintings, "Саймалуу-Таш/ Saimaluu Tash"	Emblem of Kyrgyzstan, rock paintings, "Кыргызстандын тарыхый жана архитектуралык эстеликтери" (Kyrgyzstan historical and architectural monuments), year	26 August 2013	5000	brilliant uncirculated
KG-2013-10som-Kaganat-a	KG-2013-10som-Kaganat-b	10 som	38.60mm	28.28g	Silver 925/ Gold 999	Tamga overlaid on map of ancient Kyrgyz, Old Turkic alphabet	Emblem of Kyrgyzstan, "Улуу Кыргыз каганаты" (Great Kyrgyz Khaganate), year	24 December 2013	2000	proof
KG-2014-1som-Barsbek-a	KG-2014-1som-Barsbek-b	1 som	30.00mm	12.00g	Copper-Nickel	Barsbek Kyrgyz Kagan "Барсбек кыргыз каганы"	Emblem of Kyrgyzstan, "Улуу Кыргыз каганаты" (Great Kyrgyz Khaganate), year	11 August 2014	5000	brilliant uncirculated
KG-2014-10som-Barsbek-a	KG-2014-10som-Barsbek-b	10 som	38.60mm	28.28g	Silver 925	Barsbek Kyrgyz Kagan "Барсбек кыргыз каганы"	Emblem of Kyrgyzstan, "Улуу Кыргыз каганаты" (Great Kyrgyz Khaganate), year	11 August 2014	2000	uncirculated
KG-2014-10som-Kumbez-a	KG-2014-10som-Kumbez-b	10 som	38.60mm	28.28g	Silver 925	Manas Ordo, "Манастын кумбөзу/ Kumbez of Manas"	Emblem of Kyrgyzstan, "Кыргызстандын тарыхый жана архитектуралык эстеликтери" (Kyrgyzstan historical and architectural monuments), year	11 August 2014	2000	proof
KG-2014-1som-Kumbez-a	KG-2014-1som-Kumbez-b	1 som	30.00mm	12.00g	Copper-Nickel	Manas Ordo, "Манастын кумбөзу/ Kumbez of Manas"	Emblem of Kyrgyzstan, "Кыргызстандын тарыхый жана архитектуралык эстеликтери" (Kyrgyzstan historical and architectural monuments), year	11 August 2014	5000	brilliant uncirculated
KG-2014-10som-Bubo-a	KG-2014-10som-Bubo-b	10 som	38.60mm	28.28g	Silver 925	Eurasian eagle-owl "үкү/ Bubo Bubo"	Emblem of Kyrgyzstan, Animals of the Red Book of Kyrgyzstan "Кыргызстандын кызыл китеби", year	11 August 2014	3000	proof
KG-2015-10som-Victory-a	KG-2015-10som-Victory-b	10 som	38.60mm	28.28g	Silver 925	Ribbon of Saint George folded to form 70, "Улуу Жеңишке 70 жыл/ 70 лет Великой Победе" (70 years of Great Victory)	Doves surrounding Emblem of Kyrgyzstan, year	15 April 2015	1000	proof
KG-2015-10som-Otis-a	KG-2015-10som-Otis-b	10 som	38.60mm	28.28g	Silver 925/ Gold 999	Great bustard bird "Тоодак/ Otis tarda"	Emblem of Kyrgyzstan, Animals of the Red Book of Kyrgyzstan "Кыргызстандын кызыл китеби", year	15 June 2015	3000	uncirculated
KG-2015-Ag-10som-Tamga-a	KG-2015-Ag-10som-Tamga-b	10 som	38.60mm	28.28g	Silver 925	Various aspects of ancient Kyrgyz, "Тамга" (Tamga)	Emblem of Kyrgyzstan, various Tamga, "Улуу Кыргыз каганаты" (Great Kyrgyz Khaganate), year	24 August 2015	1000	proof
KG-2015-CuNi-5som-Kyzkuumai-a	KG-2015-CuNi-5som-Kyzkuumai-b	5 som	33.00mm	14.35g	Copper-Nickel	Kyz kuu "Кыз куумай"	Emblem of Kyrgyzstan, "Улуттук спорт жана элдик оюндары" (National sports and folk games), year	24 August 2015	3000	proof-like
KG-2015-Ag-10som-Kyzkuumai-a	KG-2015-Ag-10som-Kyzkuumai-b	10 som	38.60mm	28.28g	Silver 925	Kyz kuu "Кыз куумай"	Emblem of Kyrgyzstan, "Улуттук спорт жана элдик оюндары" (National sports and folk games), year	24 August 2015	2000	proof
KG-2015-Ag-10som-EAEU-a	KG-2015-Ag-10som-EAEU-b	10 som	38.60mm	31.10g	Silver 925	Emblem of Kyrgyzstan, "Кыргыз Республикасынын Улуттук банкы" (National Bank of the Kyrgyz Republic), year	Emblem of EAEU, flags of countries in EAEU, "Евразия экономикалык союзу/ Евразийский экономический союз" (Eurasian Economic Union)	2 November 2015	1000	proof
KG-2015-Au-200som-Irbis-a	KG-2015-Au-200som-Irbis-b	200 som	25.00mm	15.55g	Gold 999	Snow leopard "Ак илбирс/ Uncia uncia", two Swarovski crystals	Emblem of Kyrgyzstan, Animals of the Red Book of Kyrgyzstan "Кыргызстандын кызыл китеби", year	25 December 2015	1000	proof
KG-2016-Ag-10som-Games-a	KG-2016-Ag-10som-Games-b	10 som	38.61x 38.61mm	31.10g	Silver 925	Various sports of World Nomad Games, "Дүйнөлүк көчмөндөр оюндары/ World Nomad Games"	Emblem of Kyrgyzstan in a yurt, year	15 August 2016	1000	proof
KG-2016-Ag-10som-independence-25-a	KG-2016-Ag-10som-independence-25-b	10 som	38.61mm	31.10g	Silver 925	Eagle overlaid on state flag, "Эгемен Кыргыз Республикасына 25 жыл/ Независимой Кыргызской Республике-25 лет" (25 years of independent Kyrgyz Republic)	Emblem of Kyrgyzstan, year	15 August 2016	1000	proof
KG-2016(2018)-Ag-10som-urkun-100-a	KG-2016(2018)-Ag-10som-urkun-100-b	10 som	38.61mm	31.10g	Silver 925	1916 overlaid on farmers with agricultural tools and burning yurt, "Үркүнгө 100 жыл" (100 years of Urkun)	Emblem of Kyrgyzstan, year	15 August 2016	1000	proof
KG-2016-Ag-10som-Yusuf-b	KG-2016-Ag-10som-Yusuf-a	10 som	38.61x 38.61mm	31.10g	Silver 925	Zhusup Balasagyn, Kutadgu Bilig written in Uyghur, "Жусуп Баласагынга 1000 жыл" (1000 anniversary of Zhusup Balasagyn)	Emblem of Kyrgyzstan, part of Kutadgu Bilig, Burana Tower, "Кыргыз Республикасынын Улуттук банкы" (National Bank of the Kyrgyz Republic), year	1 November 2016	1000	proof
KG-2016-1som-light-warrior-a	KG-2016-1som-light-warrior-b	1 som	30.00mm	12.00g	Copper-Nickel	Lightly armed warrior of Kyrgyz Khaganate "Кыргыз каганатынын куралданган жоокери/ Легковооруженный воин Кыргызского каганата"	Emblem of Kyrgyzstan, "Улуу Кыргыз каганаты" (Great Kyrgyz Khaganate), year	20 December 2016	4000	uncirculated
KG-2016-10som-light-warrior-a	KG-2016-10som-light-warrior-b	10 som	38.61mm	28.28g	Silver 925	Lightly armed warrior of Kyrgyz Khaganate "Кыргыз каганатынын куралданган жоокери/ Легковооруженный воин Кыргызского каганата"	Emblem of Kyrgyzstan, "Улуу Кыргыз каганаты" (Great Kyrgyz Khaganate), year	20 December 2016	1000	proof-like
KG-2016-10som-Aygul-a	KG-2016-10som-Aygul-b	10 som	38.61x 28.81mm	28.28g	Silver 925	Aigul flower "Айгүл гүлү/ Fritillaria eduardii Regel"	Emblem of Kyrgyzstan, Animals of the Red Book of Kyrgyzstan "Кыргызстандын кызыл китеби", year	20 December 2016	2000	proof
KG-2017-10som-Karkira-a	KG-2017-10som-Karkira-b	10 som	38.61x 28.81mm	28.28g	Silver 925	Demoiselle crane "Anthropoides virgo/ Каркыра"	Emblem of Kyrgyzstan, Animals of the Red Book of Kyrgyzstan "Кыргызстандын кызыл китеби", year	7 December 2017	1000	proof
KG-2017-1som-heavy-warrior-a	KG-2017-1som-heavy-warrior-b	1 som	30.00mm	12.00g	Copper-Nickel	Heavily armed warrior of Kyrgyz Khaganate "Кыргыз каганатынын шайма-шай куралданган жоокери"	Emblem of Kyrgyzstan, "Улуу Кыргыз каганаты" (Great Kyrgyz Khaganate), year	7 December 2017	5000	uncirculated
KG-2017-10som-heavy-warrior-a	KG-2017-10som-heavy-warrior-b	10 som	38.61mm	28.28g	Silver 925	Heavily armed warrior of Kyrgyz Khaganate "Кыргыз каганатынын шайма-шай куралданган жоокери"	Emblem of Kyrgyzstan, "Улуу Кыргыз каганаты" (Great Kyrgyz Khaganate), year	7 December 2017	1000	proof-like
KG-2018-Ag-10som-Komuz-a	KG-2018-Ag-10som-Komuz-b	10 som	38.61mm	28.28g	Silver 925	Komuz musical instrument, "Комуз/Komuz"	Emblem of Kyrgyzstan, National musical instruments "Улуттук музыкалык аспаптар", year	10 May 2018	1000	proof
		5 som	33.00mm	15.50g	Copper-Nickel	"Кыргыз Республикасынын улуттук валютасына 25 жыл" (25 years of national currency of the Kyrgyz Republic), som symbol, 1 tyiyn and 5000 som banknote	Emblem of Kyrgyzstan, current circulating coins, year	10 May 2018	5000	uncirculated
		1 som	30.00mm	12.00g	Copper-Nickel	Yurt house "Боз үй"	Emblem of Kyrgyzstan, "Улуу Кыргыз каганаты" (Great Kyrgyz Khaganate), year	28 August 2018	5000	proof-like
		10 som	38.61mm	31.10g	Silver 925	"Улак тартыш" (Kokpar-kokbori)	Emblem of Kyrgyzstan, "Дүйнөлүк көчмөндөр оюндары/ World Nomad Games", year	28 August 2018	1000	proof
		1 som	30.00mm	12.00g	Copper-Nickel	"Улак тартыш" (Kokpar-kokbori)	Emblem of Kyrgyzstan, "Дүйнөлүк көчмөндөр оюндары/ World Nomad Games", year	28 August 2018	5000	proof-like

== Commemorative banknotes ==
Commemorative banknotes
Image		Value	Dimensions	Main Colour	Description		Date of issue
Obverse	Reverse	Value	Dimensions	Main Colour	Obverse	Reverse	Date of issue
		2,000 som	153 x 76 mm	Blue and grey	Monument of Manas, a stylised yurt, symbol of "Umai Ene" in the background	Stylised tree, Khan Tengri mountain, eagle flying over lake Issyk-Kul	17 November 2017

== Awards ==
Commemorative currency awards
Award	Issuing authority	Event	Series/ Banknote/ Coin	Date of receiving award
Honorary Diploma	"Biblio-Globus" Trading House	4th International commemorative coin competition	2009 Works of Chinghiz Aitmatov series	1 December 2010
Winner of "The Most Historically Significant coin"	Krause Publications	"Coin of the Year" competition	2011 The Great Silk Road coin	1 December 2013
Third place (Honorary Diploma) in "Silver Coin of the Year"	-	8th International commemorative coin competition	2013 Saimaluu Tash coin	1 December 2014
Best Regional Banknote of 2018	-	Best regional banknote competition (In Eastern, Central European and CIS)	2017 2000 Som banknote	20 February 2018

== See also ==
- National Bank of the Kyrgyz Republic
- Kyrgyzstani som
