= Alatau (disambiguation) =

Alatau or Ala-Too, may refer to:

- Alatau, several mountain ranges in Central Asia and Siberia
- Alatau, Almaty Region, a settlement in Kazakhstan
- Alatau, Medeu District, Almaty, a settlement in Kazakhstan
- Ala-Too Square, the central square in Bishkek, Kyrgyzstan
- Alatau (Almaty Metro), a metro station located in Almaty, Kazakhstan
- Grand Alatau, a residential building project in Astana, Kazakhstan
- Alatau Sports Palace, Astana, Kazakhstan
- Alatau cattle, a breed of cattle from Kazakhstan and Kyrgyzstan
- Alatau T. Atkinson (1848–1906), member of the House of Representatives for the Republic of Hawaii

== See also ==
- Aladağ (disambiguation), Turkish equivalent
