= Zhyldyz Abdylasovna Maldybayeva =

- Жылдыз Абдыласовна Малдыбаева
- Born: July 6, 1946; Bishkek
- Died: February 8, 2022 (aged 75)
- Occupation: Composer
- Parent(s): Abdylas Maldybaev
- Awards: Dank Medal; Lenin Komsomol Prize (1975); People’s Artist of the Kyrgyz SSR

Zhyldyz Abdylasovna Maldybayeva (July 6, 1946 – February 8, 2022) is considered to be the first female Kyrgyz composer. She is best known for the 1975 ballet Ali Baba and the 40 Thieves (Али-Баба и сорок разбойников).

Zhyldyz Abdylasovna Maldybayeva was born on July 6, 1946 in Bishkek, the daughter of Kyrgyz composer and singer Abdylas Maldybaev. In 1972 she graduated from the Kyrgyz Institute of Arts, where she studied under Boris G. Glukhov. She studied under Kara Karayev at the Azerbaijanian Conservatory from 1974 to 1975.

She died on February 8, 2022.

== Awards and honors ==
She was named People's Artist of the Kyrgyz Republic and Honored Worker of Culture of the Kyrgyz Republic and was awarded the Dank Medal and the Lenin Komsomol Prize.

== Compositions ==
=== Orchestra ===
- Simfonietta I (1970)
- Simfonietta II (1971)
- Suite for chamber orchestra (1973)
- Suite for string orchestra (1968)

=== Chamber music ===
- String quartet (1966)
- Piece for oboe and piano (1972)
- Piece for cello and piano (1967)
- Sonatina for violin and piano (1969)

=== Piano ===
- Scherzo (1967)
- Sonata (1969)
- Sonatina (1973)
- Suite (1967)
- Ten Children's Miniatures (1970)
- Toccata (1971)
- Twenty four preludes (1966)
- Variations (1968)

=== Vocal ===
- Cycle (Tokombayev) for chorus (1969)
- Songs for voice and piano (1971)

=== Ballet ===
- Ali Baba and the 40 Thieves (Али-Баба и сорок разбойников, 1975).
