= Aladagh =

Aladagh (Persian: آلاداغ) is the Persian-language equivalent of the Turkish Aladağ, and may refer to:

- Aladagh Mountains, Iran
- Aladagh Rural District, Iran

== See also ==
- Alatau (disambiguation)
