= Anthem of the Kirghiz Soviet Socialist Republic =

Kyrgyz SSR Mamlekettik gimni
English: State Anthem of the Kyrgyz SSR
- Кыргыз ССР Мамлекеттик гимни
- Former regional anthem of the Kirghiz Soviet Socialist Republic Former national anthem of Kyrgyzstan (Note: Without lyrics.)
- Lyrics: Kubanychbek Malikov, Tugelbai Sydykbekov, Mukanbet Toktobaev, and Aaly Tokombaev
- Music: Vladimir Vlasov, Abdylas Maldybaev and Vladimir Fere, 1946
- Adopted: 1946
- Readopted: 1991 (without lyrics)
- Relinquished: 1991 (with lyrics); 1992 (music only)
- Succeeded by: National Anthem of the Kyrgyz Republic

Audio sample
- Vocal rendition: file; help

Instrumental
1968 instrumental audio recording

The State Anthem of the Kirghiz SSR (Note: Kyrgyz: Кыргыз Советтик Социалисттик Республикасынын Мамлекеттик Гимни, romanized: Kyrgyz Sovettik Socialisttik Respublikasynyn Mamlekettik Gimni) was the regional anthem of the Kirghiz Soviet Socialist Republic, a constituent republic of the Soviet Union. After the dissolution of the Soviet Union in 1991, the anthem has since been replaced by the State Anthem of the Kyrgyz Republic.

== History ==
The music was composed by Vladimir Vlasov, Abdylas Maldybaev and Vladimir Fere, and the lyrics were written by Kubanychbek Malikov, Tulgebai Sydykbekov, Mukanbet Toktobaev, and Aaly Tokombaev.

The anthem was used between 1946 and 1992. During de-Stalinisation in the 1950s, the lyrics were changed to remove references to Stalin. When Kyrgyzstan became independent on 31 August 1991, lyrics were removed and only the melody of the Kirghiz SSR remained in use for a short period of time. On 18 December 1992, a new anthem was officially adopted by the Supreme Council of Kyrgyzstan.

== Lyrics ==
=== Post-Stalinist version ===
Kyrgyz original

Cyrillic script

Азаттыкты Кыргыз эңсеп турганда,
Ала-Тоого Октябрдын таңы аткан.
Улуу орус достук менен кол берип,
Ленин бизге бак-таалайга жол ачкан.

Кайырма:
Жаша, Кыргызстаным,
Ленин туусу колуңда.
Алгалай бер, гүлдөй бер,
Коммунизм жолунда!

Эмгек, эрдик, күрөштөрдө такшалтып,
Таалай берген улуу Совет калкына.
Жеңиштерден жеңиштерге алпарат,
Элдин күчү – Лениндик партия.

Кайырмасы

Эл достугун болоттон бек ширетип,
Көп улуттан Союз курдук урагыс.
Жандай сүйүп даңктуу Ата Мекенди,
Түбөлүккө Коммунизм курабыз.

Кайырмасы

Latin script

Azattykty Kyrgyz engsep turganda,
Ala-Toogo Oktiabrdin tangy atkan.
Uluu orus dostuk menen kol berip,
Lenin bizge bak-taalaiga jol achkan.

Kaiyrma:
Jasha Kyrgyzstanym,
Lenin tuusu kolungda.
Algalai ber güldöi ber,
Kommunizm jolunda!

Emgek, erdik, küröshtördö takshaltyp
Taalai bergen uluu sovet kalkyna.
Jengishterden Jengishterge alparat,
Eldin küchü – Lenindik partia.

Kaiyrmasy

El dostugun bolotton bek shiretip,
Köp uluttan Soiuz kurduk uragys.
Jandai süiüp dangktuu Ata Mekendi,
Tübölükkö kommunizm kurabyz.

Kaiyrmasy

English translation

The Kyrgyz people have risen, seeking freedom,
October illuminated the Ala-Too mountains.
Great Russia welcomed us with warm friendship,
And Lenin opened to us the road of happiness.

Chorus:
Live on, Kyrgyzstan,
Raise the banner of Lenin.
March onward, flourish onward,
Along communism's path.

Remaining through labour, bravery, struggle,
Providing happiness to the Soviet people,
Leading us from victory to victory,
The strength of the people – the Party of Lenin.

Chorus

Unbreakable is the union of free republics,
We have built a multicultural union.
We love our glorious Motherland,
We shall build Communism for eternity!

Chorus

=== Original version ===
Kyrgyz original

Cyrillic script

Ала тоолук Кыргыз эли тайманбай
Сансыз жоодон эркиндигин толаскан.
Улуу орус достук менен кол берип,
Ленин бизге азаттыкка жол ачкан.

Азат туусу Советтин
Жеңишке алып бараткан.
Азат туусун көтөрүп,
Кыргызстан атактан!

Эмгек, эрдик, жеңиш үчүндим берип
Такшалдырган ата Сталин акылман.
Байлык, бакыт казанашы биздерге
Түбөлүккө гүлдөй жайнап ачылган.

Достук туусу Советтин
Жеңишке алып бараткан.
Достук туусун көтөрүп,
Кыргызстан атактан!

Жаша күчтүү Советтердин өлкөсү,
Көпул уттан союз курган урагыс.
Таалай берген зор мекенди коргошуп,
Жан аябай чептен бекем турабыз!

Таалай туусу Советтин
Жеңишке алып бараткан.
Таалай туусун көтөрүп,
Кыргызстан атактан!

Latin script

Ala tooluk kyrgyz eli taimanbai
Sansyz joodon erkindigin tolaskan.
Uluu orus dostuq menen kol berip,
Lenin bizge azattykka jol achkan.

Azat tuusu Sovettin
Jengishke alyp baratkan.
Azat tuusun kötörüp,
Kyrgyzstan ataktan!

Emgek, erdik, jengish üchündim berip
Takshaldyrgan ata Stalin akylman.
Baylyk, bakyt kazanashy bizderge
Tübölükkö güldöi jainap achylgan.

Dostuk tuusu Sovettin
Jengishke alyp baratkan.
Dostuk tuusun kötörüp,
Kyrgyzstan ataktan!

Jasha küchtüü Sovetterdin ölkösü,
Köpul uttan soiuz kurgan uragys.
Taalai bergen zor mekendi korgoshup,
Jan aiabai chepten bekem turabyz!

Taalai tuusu Sovettin
Jengishke alyp baratkan.
Taalai tuusun kötörüp,
Kyrgyzstan ataktan!

English translation

The brave Kyrgyz people of the Ala-Too,
They have gained their freedom from countless enemies.
The great Russian people warmed us with friendship,
Lenin opened the road to freedom for us all.

The free Soviet flag,
Leading us to victory.
Raise the flag of freedom,
Be glorious, Kyrgyzstan!

Victory through courage and labour,
Perfected by our wise father, Stalin,
Staking our wealth and happiness to the end,
Leading us to prosperity forever and ever.

The Soviet flag of friendship,
Leading us to victory.
Raise the flag of friendship,
Be glorious, Kyrgyzstan!

Live strong in the Soviet Country,
Unbreakable is the union of free nations.
Much we give to defend the Fatherland,
Our towering soul will stand fast.

The Soviet flag of happiness,
Leading us to victory.
Raise the flag of happiness,
Be glorious, Kyrgyzstan!

=== Initial version ===
Kyrgyz original

Cyrillic script

Таалай үчүн Кыргыз эли тайманбай,
Эзүүчүдөн эрк талашкан талбастан.
Улуу Орус достук менен кол берип,
Ленин бизге эркиндикке жол ачкан.

Кайырма:
Азат туусу Советтин,
Жеңишке алып бараткан.
Таалай туусун көтөрүп,
Кыргызстан атактан!

Эмгек, эрдик жеңиштерге дем берип,
Такшалдырды бизди Сталин акылман.
Жарактанган армия бар жеңилбес,
Талкаланат өлкөбүзгө катылган.

Кайырма

Жаша, күчтүү Совет эли түбөлүк,
Көп улуттан Союз курган урагыс.
Камсыз кылып жеткинчектер тагдырын,
Зор мекенге сонун турмуш курабыз.

Кайырма

Latin script

Taalaj üçün Qyrğyz eli tajmanbaj,
Ezüüçüdön erk talaşqan talbastan.
Uluu Orus dostuq menen qol berip,
Lenin bizge erkindikke col açqan.

Qajyrma:
Azat tuusu Sovettin,
Ceñişke alyp baratqan.
Taalaj tuusun kötörüp,
Qyrğyzstan ataqtan!

Emgek, erdik ceñişterge dem berip,
Taqşaldyrdy bizdi Stalin aqylman.
Caraqtanğan armija bar ceñilbes,
Talqalanat ölköbüzgö qatylğan.

Qajyrma

Caşa, küçtüü Sovet eli tübölük,
Köp uluttan Sojuz qurğan urağys.
Qamsyz qylyp cetkinçekter tağdyryn,
Zor mekenge sonun turmuş qurabyz.

Qajyrma

English translation

For good fortune, the Kyrgyz people do not yield,
They contended for freedom from the oppressor untiringly,
With the friendship of Great Russia extending a hand,
Lenin opened for us the path to freedom.

Chorus:
The banner of Soviet freedom
Leads us to victory.
Raising the flag of good fortune,
O Kyrgyzstan, gain renown!

Labor and valor breathe life into our victories;
The wise Stalin has tempered (trained) us.
There we have an armed, invincible army —
Conspirators against our land will be crushed shamefully.

Chorus

Live on forever, strong Soviet people,
Unbreakable, who built a Union of many nations.
Safeguarding the destiny of the children of our land,
We build a best life in the great Motherland.

Chorus
