= Flag of the Kirghiz Soviet Socialist Republic =

Flag of the Soviet republic of Kirghizia

Kirghiz Soviet Socialist Republic
- Use: Civil and state flag, civil and state ensign
- Proportion: 1:2
- Adopted: 22 December 1952
- Relinquished: 3 March 1992
- Design: A red field with a golden hammer and sickle and a gold-bordered red star in its upper canton with two navy blue bars and a white stripe in the middle of the flag.
- Designed by: Truskovsky Lev Gavrilovich
- Reverse flag
- Use: Civil and state flag, civil and state ensign

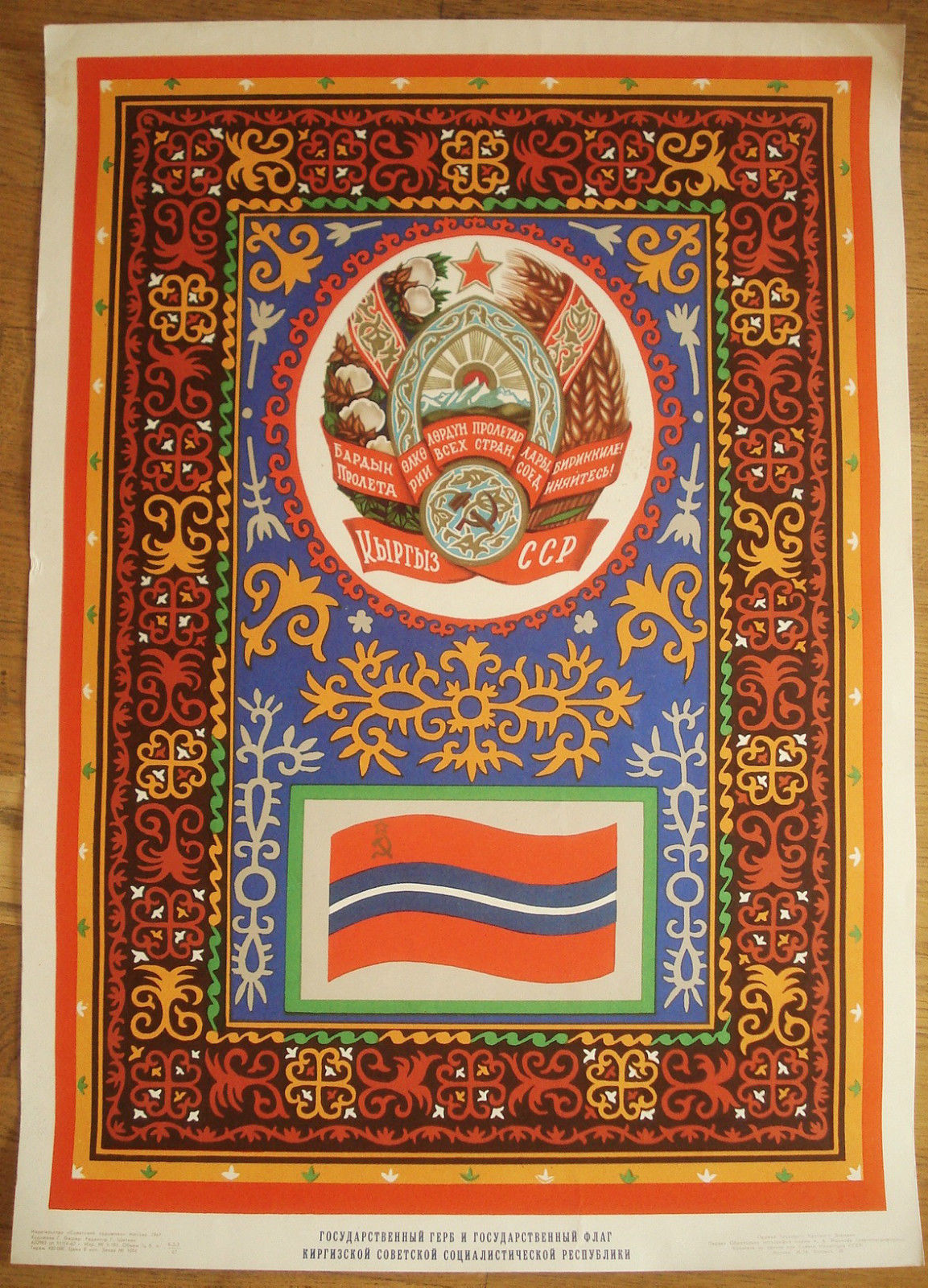
Flag and emblem of the Kirghiz SSR on a poster (1967)

The flag of the Kirghiz Soviet Socialist Republic was adopted by the Presidium of the Supreme Council of the Kirghiz SSR decreed by its Decree on 22 December 1952. The 1978 constitution of the Kirghiz SSR states that the ratio of the flag is 1:2 with the blue/white/blue stripes in the middle taking 1/3 of the flag height and the white stripes 1/20 of flag height.

According to the constitution in detail in article 168:

"The national flag of the Kirghiz Soviet Socialist Republic is a red cloth with a blue stripe in the middle of the entire length of the flag. The blue bar is one third of the width of the flag. Along the blue stripe in the middle is a white strip, equal to one-twentieth of the width of the flag. On the upper red part of the flag, at the shaft, are depicted a golden hammer and sickle and above them a red five-pointed star framed with a gold border. The ratio of the width of the flag to its length is 1:2."

— Constitution of the Kirghiz SSR, 20 April 1978.

The flag differences from the flag of the Soviet Union and the flags of the Soviet Republics was a larger star (in comparison with the image of the sickle and hammer) and the location of the hammer and sickle practically on the border of the red and blue stripes: on the flags of all other republics (except for Georgia and Turkmenia), the diameter of the circle into which the 5-terminal star was inscribed was exactly half the size of the side of the square in which the sickle and hammer were inscribed, and on the flag of Kirghizia, the diameter of the star (1/10 of the width of the flag) was more than half Side of the square (1/6 of the width of the flag).

== History ==
After the formation of the Kirghiz SSR on 5 December 1936 the first flag of the Kirghiz SSR was adopted.

"The national flag of the Kirghiz Soviet Socialist Republic is a red cloth with text "Kyrgyz SSR" printed in the Kyrgyz language on top and in the Russian language at the bottom in the top-left corner of the flag. The height-to-width ratio is 1:2."

— Constitution of the Kirghiz SSR, 23 March 1937.

The first variant of the flag used the Latin version of the Kyrgyz alphabet. This flag was in use from 1937 to 1940.

Flag of the Kirghiz SSR (1936–1940)

Variant flag of the Kirghiz SSR (1936–1940)

After the adoption of the Cyrillic alphabet new flag design was created.

Flag of the Kirghiz SSR (1940–1952)

On 22 December 1952, the red flag was replaced with a new red flag with a blue and white stripes in the middle of the entire length of the flag.

After independence, this flag remained the flag of the newly independent Kyrgyzstan until 1992 when a new flag was introduced.

== Colours ==
(1952–1992)	White	Red	Yellow	Blue
Pantone	Safe	3546c	115c	2746c
CMYK	0-0-0-0	0-100-100-19	0-15-100-0	100-82-0-40
RGB	255–255–255	206–0–0	255–216–0	0–27–153
Hexadecimal	#FFFFFF	#CE0000	#FFD800	#001B99

== See also ==
- Flag of the Soviet Union
- Coat of arms of the Kirghiz Soviet Socialist Republic
- Flag of Kyrgyzstan
