= Alatau cattle =

Breed of cattle

The Alatau cattle (also Ala Tau) are a breed of cattle of, Kazakh SSR (USSR), named after the Alatau (Turkic "Motley Mountain") Mountains.

Ala Tau cattle are used for beef and dairy production.
