= Vladimir Fere =

Russian composer

Vladimir Georgievich Fere (Russian: Владимир Георгиевич Фере; 20 May [O.S. 7 May] 1902 in Kamyshin – 2 September 1971 in Moscow) was a Russian composer. He studied at the Moscow Conservatory in 1925 and later taught there.

He was a member of a Kirghiz Republic collective assigned by the Soviet government under a plan to integrate national cultures into the arts. Kyrgyz composer Abdylas Maldybaev provided folk melodies and composed music which was organized and prepared by Fere and Russian composer Vladimir Vlasov into six Soviet state operas and other works. Their first full opera was Ai-churek. The collective is usually hypenated as Vlasov-Fere-Maldi'bayev and also composed the Kirghiz national anthem.

== Works ==
Works include:

- Sonata, for violin and piano, op. 4 (1924–25)
- Suite, for piano, op. 6 (1927)
- Poems (2) by S. Yesenin, for voice and piano, op. 7 (1928)
- Sonata, for piano (1928)
- Sonatina Alla barbara, for piano (1928)
- Our Children, piano pieces (6) for children, op. 12 (1933)
- Ai-Churek, opera in four acts after an episode of the "Manas Epos" (1938–1939) Libretto: D. Tursubekov, D. Bokonbaev and K. Malikov. First performance in 1939 in Frunse.
- String Quartet on Kirghiz Themes, op. 27 (1946)
- Manas, opera (1947, 2nd version 1966)
- The History of Happiness, cantata after V. Vinnikov (1949)
- On the Banks of Issyk-Kula, opera after K. Bayalinov and V. Vinnikov (1950)
- Toktogul, opera (1958)
- The Witch, opera (after Anton Chekhov, 1961)
- Five Millions Francs, libretto, operetta after I. Ilf and J. Petrov (1962)
- Lenin's motherland (Forever sacred places), vocal-symphonic cycle for soprano, bass and orchestra, on poems by Soviet poets, op. 41 (1970)
- Two Pieces, for cello and piano, op. 46 (1974)
- The White Wings, opera (completed by Vladimir Vlasov, 1979)
