= Emblem of the Kirghiz Soviet Socialist Republic =

- Armiger: Kirghiz Soviet Socialist Republic
- Adopted: 23 March 1937
- Crest: Red star
- Supporters: Wheat and Cotton
- Motto: Бардык өлкөлөрдүн пролетарлары, бириккиле! (Kyrgyz); Пролетарии всех стран, соединяйтесь! (Russian) "Workers of the world, unite!"
- Earlier version

The emblem of the Kirghiz Soviet Socialist Republic was adopted on 23 March 1937 by the government of the Kirghiz Soviet Socialist Republic. The coat of arms is based on the coat of arms of the Soviet Union. It shows symbols of agriculture (cotton and wheat) on a backdrop of the Ala-Too mountain ranges, surrounded by a frame of folk art of the Kyrgyz people. The red star was added in 1948. The rising sun stands for the future of the Kyrgyz nation, the star as well as the hammer and sickle for the victory of communism and the "worldwide socialist community of states".

The higher banner bears the Soviet Union state motto ("Workers of the world, unite!") in both Russian and Kyrgyz languages. In Kyrgyz, it is "Бардык өлкөлөрдүн пролетарлары, бириккиле!" (transliterated: "Bardıq ölkölördün proletarları, birikkile!").

The emblem was still used in 1992 until 1994 when they adopted the current emblem of Kyrgyzstan which retains some of the parts of the Soviet one. This includes the rising sun, wheat, cotton, the Ala-Too mountain ranges and the Kyrgyz people folk arts.

== History ==
=== Kyrgyz Autonomous Soviet Socialist Republic ===
On March 7, 1927, the First All-Kyrgyz Constituent Assembly of Soviets adopted the Declaration on the Formation of the Kirghiz Autonomous Soviet Socialist Republic, the draft Constitution of which was adopted on April 30, 1929, at the 2nd All-Kyrgyz Congress of Soviets. In her article 95 the coat of arms was described:

The coat of arms of the Kyrgyz Autonomous Soviet Socialist Republic consists of an image on a red background in the sun's rays of a gold sickle and hammer, placed criss-crossed, arms down, surrounded by a wreath of ears, inscribed in Kyrgyz and Russian: a) "Kyrgyz Autonomous SSR" and b) "Workers of all countries, unite!"

— Constitution of the Kyrgyz Autonomous Soviet Socialist Republic, Article 95

Like the constitutions of all other ASSRs within the RSFSR, the draft Constitution of the Kirghiz ASSR was not approved by the All-Russian Central Executive Committee of the Soviets (VTsIK), as stipulated in the Constitution of the RSFSR, and did not enter into force.

=== First version ===
On August 14, 1936, a competition was announced to create the arms of the future Kirghiz SSR. In the conditions of the competition it was established that the coat of arms should coincide in shape with the USSR coat of arms, have the image of a five-pointed star, sickle and hammer, the motto "Workers of all countries, unite!" and the name of the republic. The main geographical and economic features of the republic were to be reflected in the coat of arms: the geographical position was suggested to be depicted by images of mountains with snowy peaks in the rays of the rising sun, and economic - by symbols of animal husbandry, grain farming and cotton growing. The wreath in the coat of arms was proposed to be made from wheat ears and cotton branches with buds.

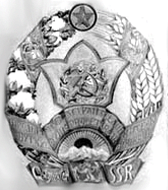
The proposed coat of arms. This coat of arms would eventually become the coat of arms of the Kirghiz SSR.

On September 8, 1936, the jury of the contest summed up its results, with 23 authors submitted 36 projects. The first prize, with 3.000 rubles was obtained by associate professor of the Moscow Polygraphic Institute Oksana Trofimovna Pavlenko (1895–1991). Even though her coat of arms was not used immediately, her design became the basis of the official version of the coat of arms. The change from her design was to remove the trident on the top of the sketch and add the ram's head and the horse to the drawing.

The award for the artistic execution of projects was marked by the Dean of the Faculty of Painting of the All-Union Artistic and Technical Institute (VKHUTEIN), Honored Artist of the RSFSR, Hungarian-Internationalist Béla Uitz, but because of the complexity of the composition, his projects could not be used as a state emblem. The prizes were also awarded to Vasiliev, Kolokolnikov, Podkhapov (the head of a bull is depicted in the project at the bottom of the coat of arms) and Ryndin, as well as Laszlo Meszaros.

=== Second version ===
According to the new Constitution of the USSR, adopted on December 5, 1936, by the Extraordinary VIII Congress of Soviets of the USSR, the Kirghiz ASSR was withdrawn from the RSFSR and transformed into the Union Kyrgyz Socialist Republic, the Constitution of which was adopted on March 23, 1937, Extraordinary V All-Kyrgyz Congress of Soviets. In its 115th article contained a description of the coat of arms:

The State Emblem of the Kirghiz Soviet Socialist Republic consists of a sickle and a hammer, above which is a mountain chain with a rising sun in a blue arch.The arch is framed with a wreath - on the right side of the wheat ears, with the left branch of cotton, the wreath is red ribboned, in the middle an inscription in the Kyrgyz and Russian languages: "Workers of all countries, unite!" At the end of the tape in the Kyrgyz language: "Kirghiz SSR".

— Constitution of the Kirghiz Soviet Socialist Republic, Article 115

The name of the republic in the Kyrgyz language: "Qьrƣьz S.S.R." (Kyrgyz S.S.R.), the motto: "ВYTKYL DYJNӨ PROLETARLARЬ, ВIRIKKILE!" (Workers of the whole world, unite!).

The motive of the ornament - in the form of plant shoots with leaves - is found especially often in appliqués on koshmas. The white edge of the ornamental stalk in the socket imitates the technique of Kyrgyz embroidery. Inside the arch there are lilac, sunlit peaks of Ala-Too mountain ranges. The coat of arms embody the republic's desire for progress.

=== Third version ===
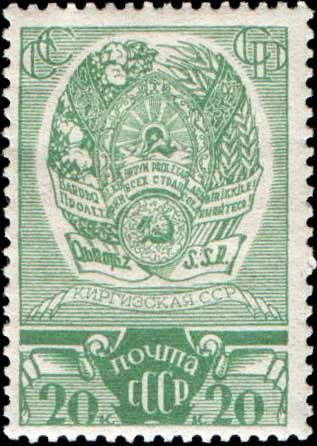
Emblem of the Kirghiz SSR on a 1937 postage stamp

In 1937, in connection with the preparation for the publication of the collection "The Constitution of the USSR and the Constitutions of the Union Republics", a special commission was created under the Presidium of the Supreme Council of the USSR, whose members were to check and clarify the inscriptions and their translation on the arms of the Union republics. According to the commission, the motto "Proletarians of all countries, unite!" in the arms of the Kirghiz, Turkmen, Tajik and Kazakh SSR was translated into the title languages inaccurately and literally read: "Workers of the whole world, unite!". The corrected version of the motto in Kyrgyz was: "ВARDЬQ ӨLKӨLӨRDYN PROLETARLARЬ, ВIRIKKILE!".

=== Fourth version ===
According to the Decree of the Presidium of the Supreme Council of the USSR of 11 July 1939 on the translation of the alphabets of a number of Union and autonomous republics from Latin into Russian, in 1940 the Kyrgyz language was switched from Latin script to Cyrillic script. This caused the inscription of the coat of arms changed.

=== Fifth version ===
In 1948, by the Law of the Kirghiz SSR, in Article 115 of the Constitution of the Kirghiz SSR in 1937, the description of the state emblem was amended. The words "At the top of the emblem there is a five-pointed star" were added. This was confirmed by the Regulations on the State Emblem of the Kyrgyz Soviet Socialist Republic, approved by the Decree of the Presidium of the Supreme Council of the Kirghiz SSR.

=== Sixth version ===
In the new spelling rules of the Kirghiz language in 1956, abbreviated letters are not separated by dots, therefore the second part of the name of the republic (the abbreviation "ССР") began to be written without them.

In Chapter IX of the new Constitution (Basic Law) of the Kirghiz SSR adopted on April 20, 1978, by the extraordinary eighth session of the Supreme Council of the Kirghiz SSR of the ninth convocation, the arms were described as follows:

The State Emblem of the Kyrgyz Soviet Socialist Republic is an image of a sickle and a hammer in an ornamented circle, a mountain chain with a rising sun in a blue arch framed to the right by ears of wheat, to the left - a branch of cotton and intertwined with a red ribbon. in Kyrgyz and Russian "Proletarians of all countries, unite!", at the bottom in the Kyrgyz language "Kyrgyz SSR." At the top of the emblem is a five-pointed star.

— Constitution of the Kirghiz Soviet Socialist Republic, Article 167

The image of the emblem did not change at the same time and was confirmed by a new edition of the Regulations on the State Emblem of the Kyrgyz Soviet Socialist Republic, approved by the Decree of the Presidium of the Supreme Council of the Kirghiz SSR.

== Gallery ==
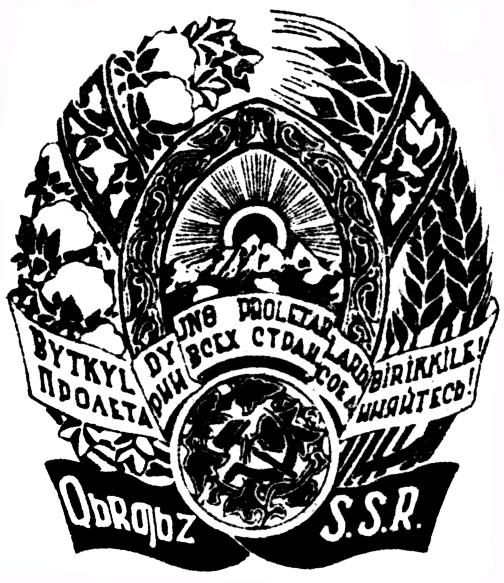
Emblem of Kirghiz Soviet Socialist Republic (1937)

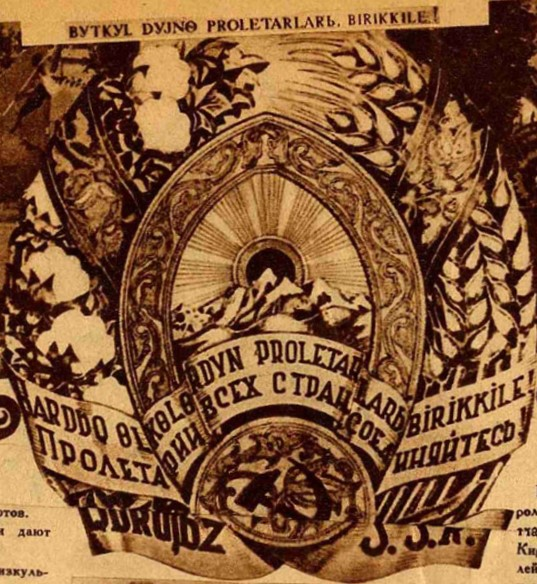
Emblem of Kirghiz Soviet Socialist Republic (1937–1940)

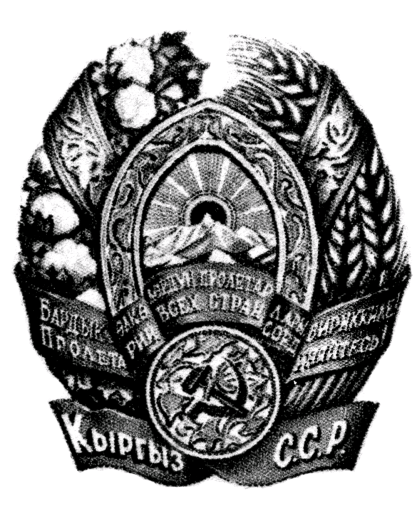
Emblem of Kirghiz Soviet Socialist Republic (1940–1948)

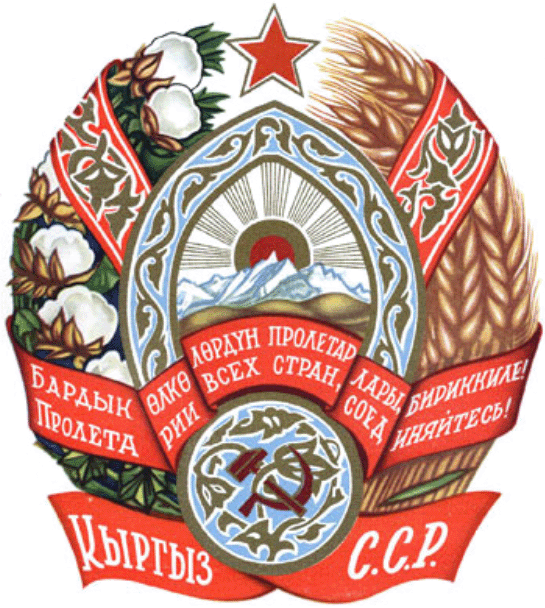
Emblem of Kirghiz Soviet Socialist Republic (1948–1956)

Emblem of the Kirghiz Soviet Socialist Republic (1956–1991) and Kyrgyzstan until 1994
