= Aladağ =

Aladağ is a Turkish place name that means "variegated mountain" and may refer to:

== Mountain ranges ==
- Aladaglar, a mountain range in Turkey
- Anti-Taurus Mountains, also known as Aladağlar, mountains in the Central Taurus mountain chain of the Taurus Mountains in Turkey

== Places ==
- Aladağ, Adana, a district center of Adana Province, Turkey
  - Aladağ mine, a chromium ore mine
- Aladağ, Ezine
- Aladağ, Mersin, a village in Toroslar District of Mersin Province, Turkey
- Aladağ, Tarsus, a village in Tarsus district of Mersin Province, Turkey
- Aladağlar National Park, a national park stretching over the provinces of Kayseri, Niğde and Adana in Turkey

== People with the surname ==
- Emin Aladağ (born 1983), Turkish footballer
- Feo Aladag (born 1972), Austrian film director, screenwriter, producer, and actress
- Merve Aladağ (born 1993), Turkish footballer
- Züli Aladağ (born 1968), German-Kurdish film director, film producer, and screenwriter
- Nevin Aladağ (born 1972), Turkish artist (documenta 14)

== See also ==
- Alatau (disambiguation), synonymous term
- Aladagh (disambiguation)
