= Abdylas Maldybaev =

Kyrgyz composer, actor, and operatic tenor (1906–1978)

- Kyrgyz: Абдылас Малдыбаев
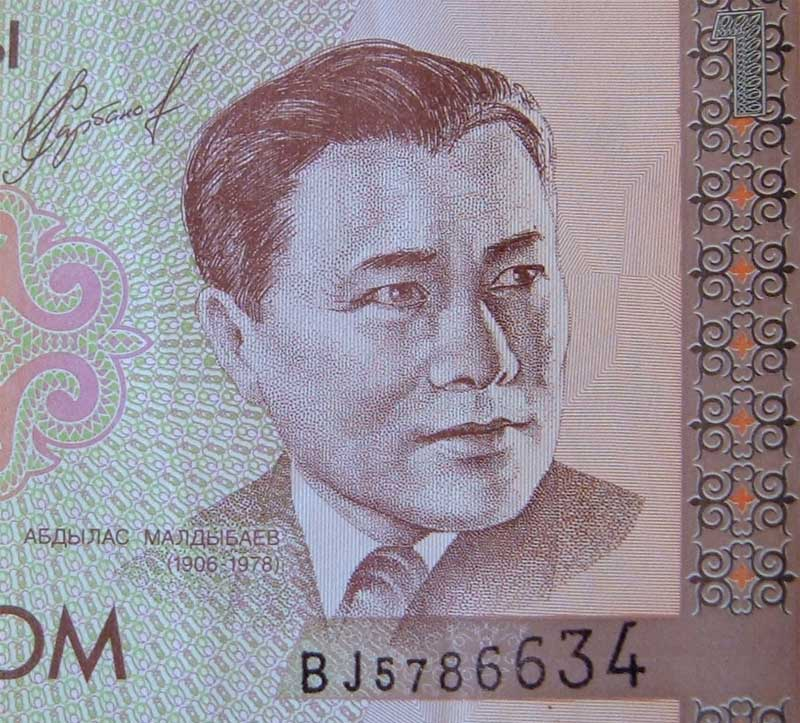
- Abdylas Maldybaev, as shown on the Kyrgyz 1 som note
- Born: July 7, 1906; Kara-Bulak, Pishpek District, Semirechye Oblast, Turkestan Krai, Russian Empire
- Died: May 31, 1978 (aged 71); Frunze, Kirghiz SSR, USSR (now Bishkek, Kyrgyzstan)
- Burial place: Ala-Archa Cemetery

Abdylas Maldybaevich Maldybaev (Kyrgyz: Абдылас Малдыбаевич Малдыбаев; 7 July 1906 – 31 May 1978) was a Soviet and Kyrgyz composer, actor, and operatic tenor singer. Maldybaev was one of the composers of the state anthem of the Kirghiz SSR and is still renowned for his operatic composition. He helped popularize Kyrgyz music by skillfully using Western European techniques. The Kyrgyz one som banknote pictures him.

Maldybayev provided folk melodies and composed music which was organized and prepared by Russian composers Vladimir Vlasov and Vladimir Fere into six Soviet state operas and other works. Their first full opera was Ai-churek. The collective is usually hyphenated as Vlasov-Fere-Maldybayev, which also composed the Kirghiz national anthem.

He died on 31 May 1978.

== Works ==
- Ai-Churek, opera in four acts after an episode of the "Manas Epos" (1938–1939) Libretto: D. Tursubekov, D. Bokonbaev and K. Malikov. First performance in 1939 in Frunze.
- The History of Happiness, cantata after V. Vinnikov (1949)
- On the Banks of Issyk-Kula, opera after K. Bayalinov and V. Vinnikov (1950)
- Toktogul, opera (1958)

His work has been recorded and issued on media including:

- Ai-Churek, LP Melodiya D 07269-74: Soloists, Chorus and Orchestra of the Kirghiz State Theatre Opera & Ballet, Dzhumakhmatov (conductor), 1938
- On the Banks of Issyk-Kul, LP Melodiya D 2253-4: Radio Orchestra, Tselikovsky (conductor), S. Kiyzbayeva (soprano), K. Chodronov (bass), 1950
- Toktogul, LP Melodiya D 4610-1: (Fragments) Chorus and Orchestra of the Khirgiz State Theatre Opera & Ballet, Dzhumakhmatov (conductor), 1958
