= Vladimir Vlasov =

Russian composer (1903–1986)

Vladimir Aleksandrovich Vlasov (Russian: Владимир Александрович Власов; 7 January 1903, Moscow – 7 September 1986, Moscow) was a Soviet and Russian composer and conductor. He studied at the Moscow Conservatory from 1924 to 1931 under such teachers as Georgy Catoire, Abram Yampolsky, and Nikolai Zhilyayev. In 1936 he founded the Music and Drama Theatre in Frunze, working as the company's artistic director until 1942. He worked as the artistic director of the Moscow PO from 1942 to 1949. He was made a People's Artist of the RSFSR and of the Kirghiz SSR.

As a composer, Vlasov is known for his numerous operas, six of which were written in a Soviet government assigned collaboration with Vladimir Fere and Abdylas Maldybaev. The collective is usually hyphenated as Vlasov-Fere-Maldybaev, which also composed the Kirghiz national anthem.

== Discography ==
His work has been recorded and issued on media including:

- Ai-Churek (1938) LP Melodiya D 07269-74: Soloists, Chorus and Orchestra of the Khirgiz State Theatre Opera & Ballet, DZhumakhmatov (conductor)
- Five Pieces for violin and piano 1. Romance; 2. Waltz; 3. Folk Dance; 4. Nocturne; 5. Scherzo CD Russia Revelation RV 10071: Leonid Kogan (violin), Alexander Marakov (piano) (Rec: 1949)
- On the Banks of Issyk-Kula (1950) LP Melodiya D 2253-4: Radio Orchestra, Tselikovsky (conductor), S. Kiyzbayeva (soprano), K. Chodronov (bass)
- Rhapsody on Rumanian Themes for orchestra (1955) LP Melodiya D 5262-3: Radio Orchestra, A. Gauk (conductor) and LP Melodiya D 016323-4: Radio Orchestra, A. Gauk (conductor)
- Akyn sings about Lenin (1957) for orchestra (1957) LP Melodiya D 016323-4: Radio Orchestra, A. Gauk (conductor) Festive Overture for orchestra
- Tales of Tagor symphonic dances on verses by R. Tagor (1958) LP Melodiya D 07979-80: Radio Orchestra, Ginsburg (conductor)
- Toktogul (1958) LP Melodiya D 4610-1: (Fragments) Chorus and Orchestra of the Khirgiz State Theatre Opera & Ballet, Dzhumakhmatov (conductor)
- String Quartet No. 3 "Preludes" (1965) LP Melodiya D 09269-70: Borodin Quartet
- Asye (1967) ballet in three acts after Aktamatov, Libretto: B. Shalinlov and N. Sharitononov. LP Melodiya D 020571-2: Bolshoi Theatre Orchestra, Zuraitis (conductor) and LP Melodiya C 01541-2: Bolshoi Theatre Orchestra, Zuraitis (conductor)
- Ballade for cello solo LP Melodiya 027975-6: V. Yagling (cello)
- Cello Concerto No. 1 in C major LP Melodiya D 026955-6: Radio Orchestra, G. Rozhdestvensky (conductor), M. Rostropovich (cello), LP Melodiya C 04645-6: Radio Orchestra, G. Rozhdestvensky (conductor), M. Rostropovich (cello) and CD Brilliant Classics 92771 (10 CD-set): USSR State Radio & TV SO, G. Rozhdestvensky (cond), M. Rostropovich (cello)
- Improvisation for cello solo LP Melodiya D 010325-8: V. Feigin (cello)
- Pieces on Slovak Themes LP Melodiya D 5262-3: Radio Orchestra, A. Gauk (conductor)
