= Aladağ mine =

Chromium ore mine in Aladağ, Adana, Turkey

- Location in Turkey

Location
- Location: Aladağ, Adana, Turkey; 37°32′47″N 35°23′55″E

Production
- Products: Chromium ore

History
- Opened: 1973

Owner
- Company: Etibank

The Aladağ mine is a large chromium ore mine located at Adana Province in southern Turkey, 229 km (142 mi) south of the capital, Ankara. Aladağ represents one of the largest chromium reserves in Turkey having an estimated reserve of 200 million tonnes of chromium ore, which contains 10.84 million tonnes of chromium metal at its grading of 5.42%.
