= Emblem of Kyrgyzstan =

- Armiger: Kyrgyz Republic
- Adopted: January 14, 1994 (Modifications amended in 2016)
- Shield: Azure, a rising sun or, the Tian Shan mountains proper, and fields azure; overall, a falcon displayed argent. On either side, sheafs of wheat and cotton proper.
- Motto: Кыргыз Республикасы

The Emblem of Kyrgyzstan was adopted in 1994. The emblem has a circular form which mostly bears the color blue. Light blue is known as the Kyrgyz color of courage and generosity (cf. the flag of Kazakhstan and the emblem of Kazakhstan). To the left and right of the coat of arms, wheat and cotton are displayed. In the upper part, the name of the country appears in Kyrgyz "Кыргыз Республикасы" (Kyrgyz Respublikasy). It was designed by A. Abdraev and S. Dubanaev.

== Description ==
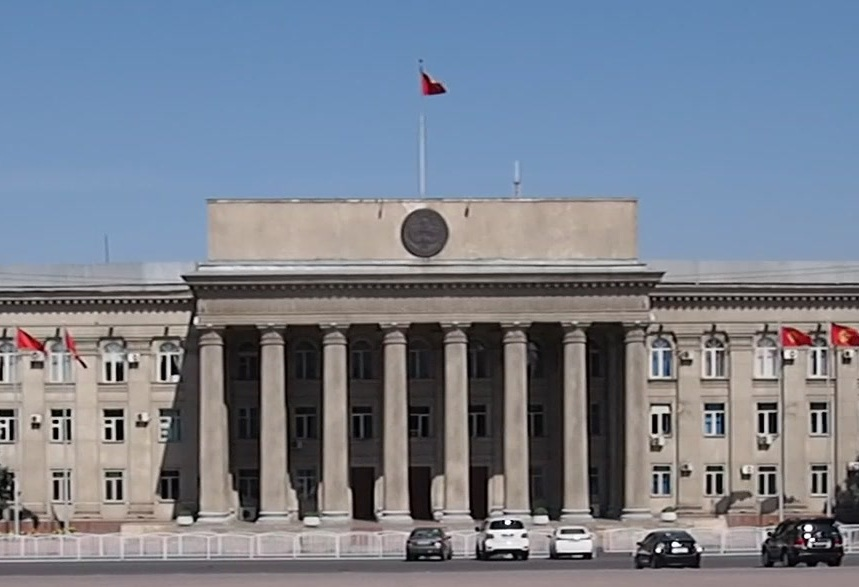
The emblem at the Old Square, Bishkek

The emblem was in a circular in which the conventional language of symbols expresses the mentality, nature, culture and management of the Kyrgyz people.

In the foreground in the lower most part of the blue circle is a frontal image of a white falcon with wings wide open. The bird "Ak Shumkar" as a symbol of purity and nobleness of thoughts is sung in legends and folk epos. The image on the emblem that the bird means a way of life, the traditional culture of the Kyrgyz people and symbolizes the protection of the Kyrgyz land stretching behind it with Issyk-Kul and the snowy peaks of the Ala-Too mountains (especially the Tian Shan peaks). In the depths of the circle, because of the mountains, occupying the upper part of the State Emblem, the sun rises, golden rays shining on the sacred land of Kyrgyzstan. the forty rays that extend from it refer to the legendary forty clans of Manas.

The centre plot has a decorative frame in the form of a ribbon strip giving the necessary information: the word “Кыргыз” (Kyrgyz) is located in the upper part, and “Республикасы” (Republic) in the lower part. The sides of the frame contain decor, composed of motifs of the ornament, stylized opened cotton bolls, ears of wheat – the main cultivated crops on Kyrgyz soil.

The emblem is executed in warm-cold colours. The light silhouette of the image on a dark background is strict and expressive. A circle is outlined by a contour line.

=== Colour specifications ===
The following are the Pantone colours adopted from the government's website:

Colour Regulations
Colour	PANTONE	CMYK	RGB	HEX
Royal Blue	PANTONE 2945 C	100 – 53 – 2 – 16	0 – 102 – 161	#0066a1
Medium Yellow	PANTONE 123 C	0 – 29 – 100 – 0	253 – 188 – 45	#fdbc2d
Silver	PANTONE Cool Gray 5 C	0 – 0 – 0 – 28	195 – 195 – 195	#c3c3c3
Sky Blue	PANTONE 2995 C	100 – 0 – 0 – 0	0 – 175 – 239	#00afef

== History ==
Before independence from the USSR, Kyrgyzstan had a coat of arms similar to all other Soviet Republics. Like other post-Soviet republics whose arms do not predate the October Revolution, the current emblem retains some components of the Soviet one, in this case, the wheat, cotton, rising sun and the panoramic view of the Ala-Too mountains.

== Gallery ==
The coat of arms of the Kirghizia under the Soviet Union and the independent Kyrgyzstan from 31 August 1991 to 3 January 1994.

Original version used from 1994 till its modification in 2016.

Emblem of the State Border Guard Service.

== See also ==
- Flag of Kyrgyzstan
- Hawk of Quraish
