= Flag of Kyrgyzstan =

Kyrgyz Republic
- Use: National flag and ensign
- Proportion: 3:5
- Adopted: 3 March 1992; 34 years ago (first introduction); 26 December 2023; 2 years ago (current version)
- Design: A red field charged with a yellow sun with forty uniformly spaced rays, representing the forty clans united in legend by Manas; the sun is crossed by two sets of four lines, representing the traditional Kyrgyz yurt.
- Use: Presidential Standard
- Proportion: 3:5
- Design: A red field charged with the emblem of the president of Kyrgyzstan in the centre
- Use: Local government flag
- Proportion: 3:5
- Adopted: Since 2017
- Design: A red field charged with the national emblem in the center, used by local governments in Kyrgyzstan

The State Flag of the Kyrgyz Republic (Note: Kyrgyz: Кыргыз Республикасынын Мамлекеттик туусу, romanized: Kyrgyz Respublikasynyn Mamlekettik tuusu; Russian: Государственный Флаг Кыргызской Республики) consists of a red field charged with a yellow sun that contains a depiction of a tündük, the opening in the center of the roof of a yurt (traditional nomadic tent). Adopted in 1992, just over seven months after the country's independence was declared, to replace the flag of the Kirghiz SSR, it has been the flag of Kyrgyzstan since that year. The red on the flag is said to be inspired by the pennant lifted by Manas, the country's folk hero.

== History ==
Shahada flag used by Kyrgyz rebels in revolts in 1898 and in Jizzakh in 1916

Flag used by Kyrgyz rebels in revolt in 1916

Kyrgyz rebels wielded white banners (named "White Banner of National Liberation") during the Andijan uprising of 1898. Later, during the Central Asian revolt of 1916, they used it again during an uprising in Jizzakh and during an attack on Prebechakenska.

In Semirechye, under the leadership of Mokush Shabdanov, they used the white and red banner of Shabdan Dzhantayev.

Under Soviet rule, the Union Republic — coterminous with modern-day Kyrgyzstan — utilized a flag derived from the flag of the Soviet Union and representing Communism, that was adopted in 1953. It declared itself independent on 31 August 1991, approximately four months before the dissolution of the Soviet Union. Nevertheless, the Soviet-era flag maintained its status as the national flag for seven months after independence was declared. It was finally replaced by new design on 3 March 1992, one day after Kyrgyzstan was admitted to the United Nations along with seven other post-Soviet states.

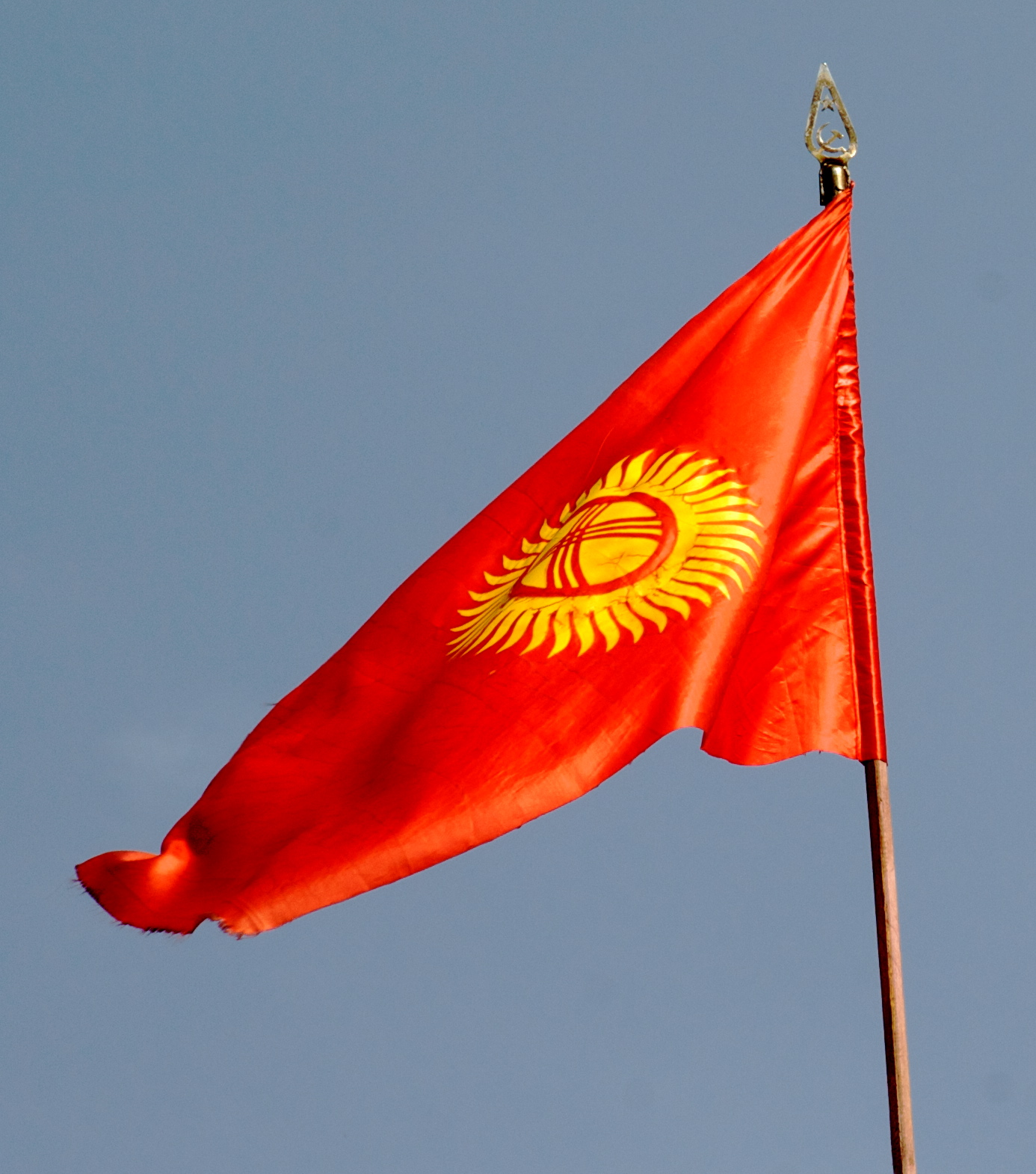
Kyrgyz former flag in flight, photographed in 2008

In late 2023, a debate was led in the Jogorku Kengesh (parliament of Kyrgyzstan) to straighten the wavy sun rays due to its supposed similarity to a sunflower, which in Kyrgyz culture can signify "a fickle and servile person willing to switch allegiance for personal benefit". The bill passed its first reading on 29 November, and second and third readings on 20 December. The bill was signed into law by President Sadyr Japarov on 22 December. The law was officially published on 26 December and came into force on the same day.

== Chronology ==
Flag	Date	Use	Description
Soviet Union (1926–1991)
	1929–1936	Flag used during the Kirghiz Autonomous Socialist Soviet Republic	Possible red flag with the hammer and sickle and bilingual initials for Kirghiz ASSR in the canton, however it likely was never official.
	1936–1940	Flag used during the Kyrgyz Soviet Socialist Republic	A red flag with bilingual version of "Kirgyz SSR" in the canton.
	1940–1952	Flag used during the Kyrgyz Soviet Socialist Republic	A red flag with bilingual version of "Kirgyz SSR" in the canton.
	1952–1991	Flag used during the Kyrgyz Soviet Socialist Republic	A red flag with a gold-bordered red star, hammer and sickle in the canton, and two navy blue bars and a white stripe in the middle.
	1952–1991	Flag used during the Kyrgyz Soviet Socialist Republic	All flags of the constituent republics of the Soviet Union did not bear the hammer and sickle on their reverse side.
Kyrgyz Republic (1991–present)
	1991–1992	The flag of the Kyrgyz SSR remained in use for a year.	A red flag with a gold-bordered red star, hammer and sickle in the canton, and two navy blue bars and a white stripe in the middle.
	1991–1992	The flag of the Kyrgyz SSR remained in use for a year.	All flags of the constituent republics of the Soviet Union did not bear the hammer and sickle on their reverse side.
	1992–2023	National flag of the Kyrgyz Republic	A yellow sun with a traditional Kyrgyz yurt motif in its center on a red field.
	2023–present	National flag of the Kyrgyz Republic	The sun's rays were straightened to reduce its supposed resemblance to a sunflower and the number of yurt beams in the center of the flag was increased from three to four.

== Design ==
=== Symbolism ===
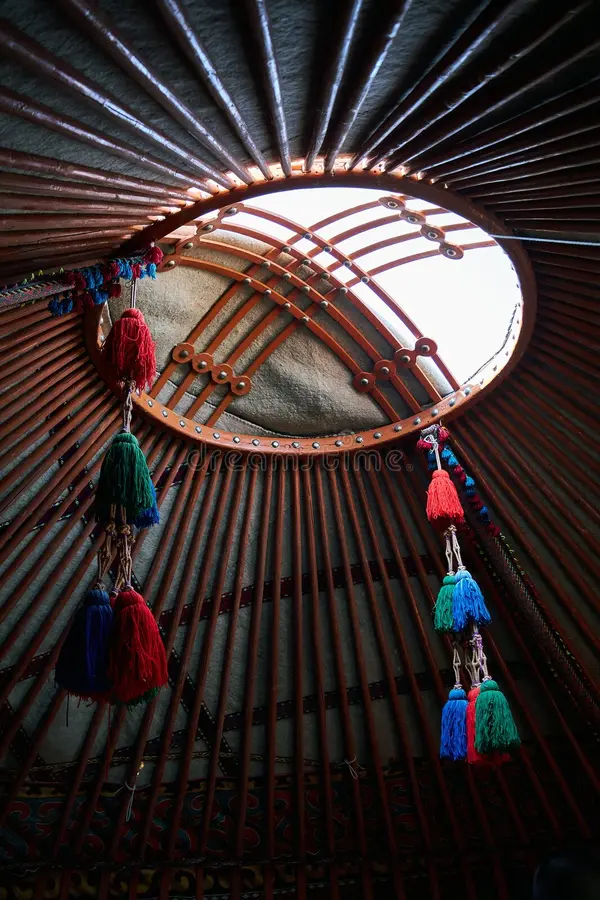
The interior view of a Kyrgyz yurt's roof

The colors and symbols of the flag carry cultural, political, and regional meanings. The red field stands for "bravery and valor", and alludes to the purported emblem hoisted by Manas, the national hero of Kyrgyzstan. The sun epitomizes peace and prosperity, while its 40 rays stand for the number of tribes united by Manas to fight against the Mongols, as well as the number of followers he had.

The centre of the sun features a stylized illustration of the roof (tündük) atop a traditional Kyrgyz tent (yurt) when viewed from the interior. Although these tents are less commonly used today, its incorporation into the flag is meant to symbolize the "origin of life", the "unity of time and space", as well as the people's "hearth and home" and their history.

=== 2023 change ===
In late 2023, a debate was led in the Zhogorku Kengesh (parliament of Kyrgyzstan) to straighten the wavy sun rays due to its supposed similarity to a sunflower, which in Kyrgyz culture can signify "a fickle and servile person willing to switch allegiance for personal benefit". The bill passed its first reading on 29 November, and second and third readings on 20 December. The bill was signed into law by President Sadyr Japarov on 22 December. The law was officially published on 26 December and came into force on the same day.

=== Other proposals for change ===
The "Land of Celestial Mountains" flag proposed in 2011.

In 2011, a group of activists suggested rebranding the country as the "Land of Celestial Mountains", also offering an updated flag depicting white mountains and light blue sky.

The red field has been the source of much criticism. Some believe that it evokes the nation's tempestuous history, while others are of the opinion that it is a lingering remnant of communism in the country.

=== Color scheme ===
Colors scheme	Red	Yellow
Pantone	1788 C	Yellow C
CMYK	0, 100, 100, 0	0, 0, 100, 0
HEX	#FF0000	#FFFF00
RGB	255, 0, 0	255, 255, 0

== Regional flags ==
Each region (областы, oblasty or облусу, oblusu) of Kyrgyzstan has its own flag.

Batken Region

Bishkek (independent city)

Chüy Region

Issyk-Kul Region

Jalal-Abad Region

Naryn Region

Osh Region

Talas Region

== City flags ==
Batken

Bishkek (city with region status)

Balykchy, Issyk-Kul Region

Karakol, Issyk-Kul Region

Manas

Naryn

Osh

== Other flags ==
Flag of Kyrgyzstan Border Service (obverse)

Flag of Kyrgyzstan Border Service (reverse)

Flag of Kyrgyz Armed Forces (Kyrgyz)

Flag of Kyrgyz Armed Forces (Russian)

== See also ==
- List of Kyrgyz flags
- Emblem of Kyrgyzstan
- Tengrism
