= Alatau =

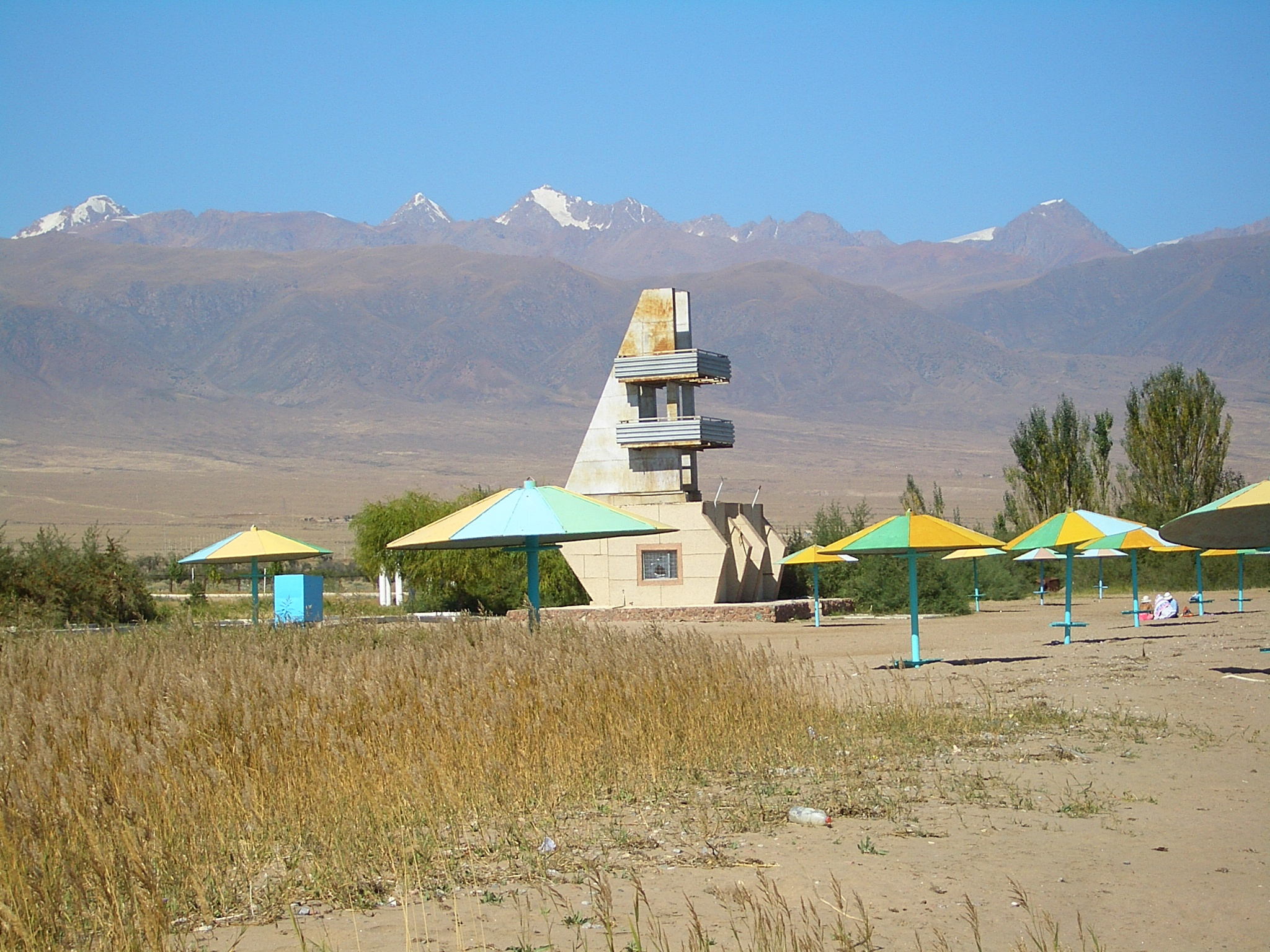
Mountains of Kungoy Ala-Too seen from Kosh-Kol, Kyrgyzstan

Alatau (/ˌɑːləˈtaʊ/ AH-lə-TOW; Russian: Алатау [əɫɐˈtaʊ]; Kazakh: Алатау [ɑɫɑtʰɑ́w]), known in Kyrgyzstan as Ala-Too (/ˌɑːləˈtuː/; Kyrgyz: Ала-Тоо [ɑɫɑtʰóː]), is a generic name for a number of mountain ranges in Central Asia and southern Siberia, characterised by interleaving areas of vegetation, scattered rocks and snows.

Notable mountain ranges that share the name include:

- Kuznetsk Alatau – a mountain range in southern Siberia, Russia
- Several ranges of the Tian Shan
  - Dzungarian Alatau – a mountain range in the northern Tian Shan, in Kazakhstan and northwestern China
  - Kungoy Ala-Too – a mountain range in the western Tian Shan, in Kazakhstan and Kyrgyzstan
  - Kyrgyz Ala-Too – a mountain range in the western Tian Shan, in Kazakhstan and Kyrgyzstan
  - Talas Ala-Too – a mountain range in the western Tian Shan, in Kazakhstan, Kyrgyzstan, and Uzbekistan
  - Terskey Ala-Too – in the southern Tian Shan, in Kyrgyzstan
  - Trans-Ili Alatau – in the western Tian Shan, in Kazakhstan and Kyrgyzstan

== See also ==
- Aladağ – the Turkish synonym
