= Boris Yugai =

Kyrgyz major general (1957–2010)

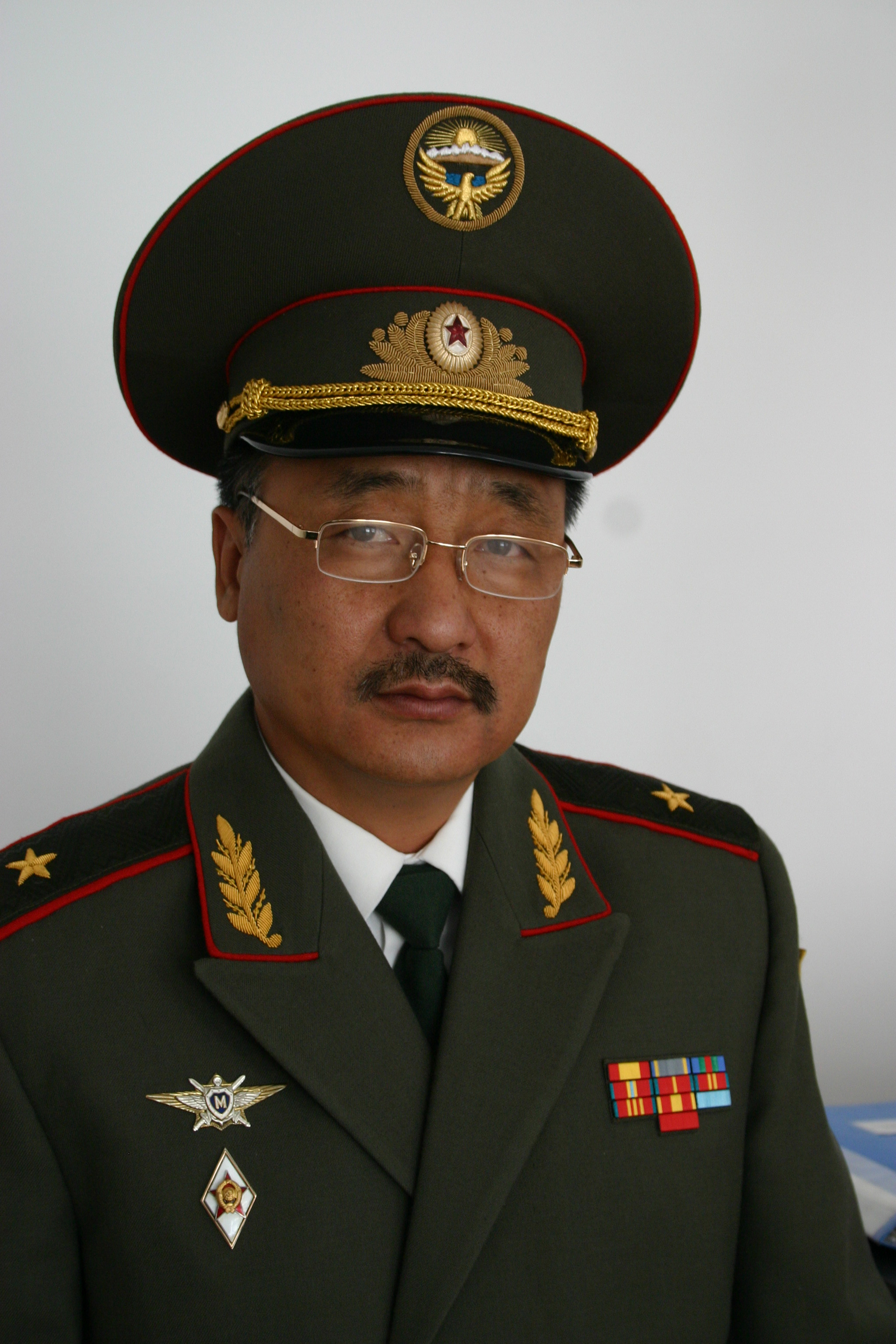

Chief of the General Staff
- In office 14 March 2007 – 24 June 2008
- President: Kurmanbek Bakiyev
- Preceded by: Unknown
- Succeeded by: Abibilla Kudayberdiev

Personal details
- Born: 15 November 1957 Georgievka, Kazakh SSR, Soviet Union (now Korday, Kazakhstan)
- Died: 12 March 2010 (aged 52) Bishkek, Kyrgyzstan
- Spouse: Natasha Park

Military service
- Allegiance: Soviet Union; Kyrgyzstan
- Branch/service: Soviet Army; Kyrgyz Army
- Years of service: 1975–2008
- Rank: Major General

Boris Alexandrovich Yugai (Russian: Борис Александрович Югай; Korean: 보리스 알렉산드로비치 유가이; 15 November 1957 – 12 March 2010) was a Kyrgyz major general who served as the Chief of the Armed Forces General Staff from March 2007 to June 2008 under President Kurmanbek Bakiyev. He was also the Chief of the Joint Staff of the Collective Security Treaty Organization from 2007 to 2008. Yugai was generally regarded as an important figure in the military, often enjoying strong support among military personnel.

== Early life and career ==
Yugai was born on 15 November 1957 in Georgievka in the Dzhambul Region of the Kazakh SSR (now Korday, Kazakhstan). Yugai was Korean by ethnicity and was fluent in the Korean language outside of Russian and Kyrgyz. In 1979, he graduated from the Leningrad Higher Artillery Command School, majoring in mathematics. He took part in the Soviet–Afghan War as part of a Soviet Army contingent from 1980 to 1982. Throughout his time in the army, he was mostly based in Ukrainian SSR, Uzbek SSR, East Germany, and Turkmen SSR.

After the creation of the Armed Forces of the Kyrgyz Republic, he immediately took a commission in the Kyrgyz Army as a platoon commander. As an officer, he took part in the elimination of the militants of the Islamic Movement of Uzbekistan in southern Kyrgyzstan during the Batken conflict.

From December 2000 to October 2002, Yugai served as the Head of the Main Organization and Mobilization Directorate of the General Staff. During this period, he graduated from academic courses at the Military Academy of the General Staff of the Armed Forces of Russia in 2001. He was appointed Deputy Minister of National Defense in October 2002 and Chief of the General Staff/First Deputy Minister of Defense of Kyrgyzstan on 14 March 2007. From October 2007, he was also concurrently the Chief of the Joint Staff of the Collective Security Treaty Organization. He served until 24 June 2008 and was replaced by Abibilla Kudayberdiev.

In 2008–2009, he was interrogated in connection with the criminal case of former Defense Minister Ismail Isakov and was accused of abuse of power. In October 2009, the case was dropped.

== Death ==
He died in Bishkek in March 2010 as a result of a heart attack. Kyrgyz media mostly avoided reporting Yugai’s death despite his regard in the army.

== Personal life ==
The youngest of three boys, his eldest brother is the dean of a university, and his second brother is a university professor. He also has a younger sister, who is a cardiologist. His wife, Natasha, was also of Korean descent.

== Awards ==
- Order "For Service to the Homeland in the Armed Forces of the USSR" 1st and 2nd Degree
- Medal "To the Soldier-Internationalist from the Grateful Afghan People"
- Order of Friendship
- Medal "For Impeccable Service" 1st Degree (Күжүрмөн кызмат өтөгөндүгү үчүн)
- Medal "10 years of the Armed Forces of the Kyrgyz Republic"
