= Scorpion 25th Special Forces Brigade =

Kyrgyz specialized unit

- 25-чи Атайын Багыттагы "Скорпион" Бригадасы; 25-chi Ataiyn Bagyttagy "Skorpion" Brigadasy
- Active: 31 March 1994 – present
- Country: Kyrgyzstan
- Branch: Kyrgyz Army
- Type: Spetsnaz
- Role: Special operations
- Size: Brigade (800 personnel)
- Garrison/HQ: Tokmok
- Nickname: Scorpion Spetsnaz (Спецназ Скорпион)
- Colors: Gold
- Anniversaries: 31 March
- Engagements: 1994 Afghan War; 1999 Batken Conflict; 2022 Kazakh protests

Commanders
- Notable commanders: Colonel Stanislav Kholodkov

Insignia
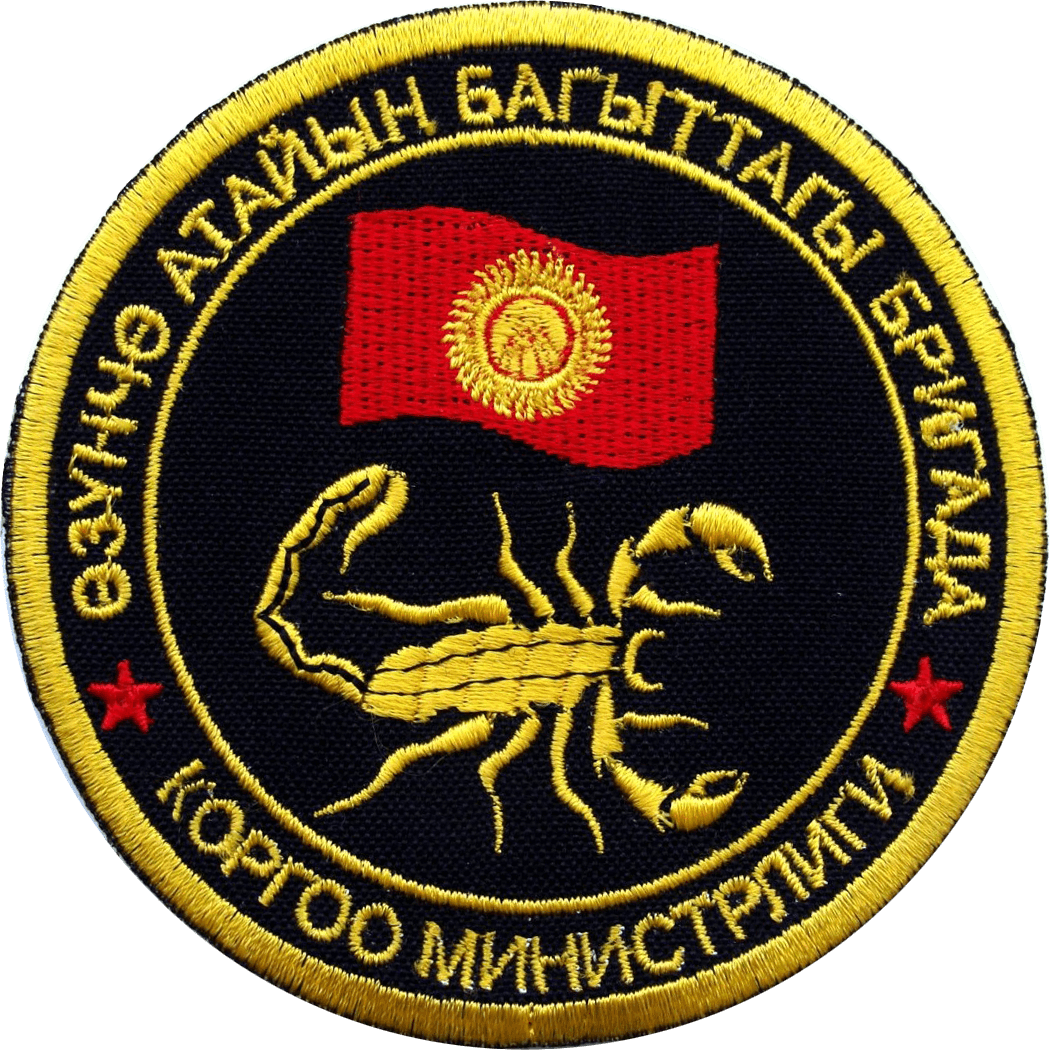
- Brigade shoulder sleeve insignia

The Scorpion 25th Special Forces Brigade (Kyrgyz: 25-чи Атайын Багыттагы "Скорпион" Бригадасы) or known simply as Scorpion Spetsnaz (Спецназ Скорпион) is a specialized Kyrgyz military unit in the country's Ground Forces. It is now considered to be one of the best armed formations in the armed forces. Being special forces troops, they specialize in airborne combat, hand-to-hand combat, covert operations, as well as insurgent skills.

== History ==
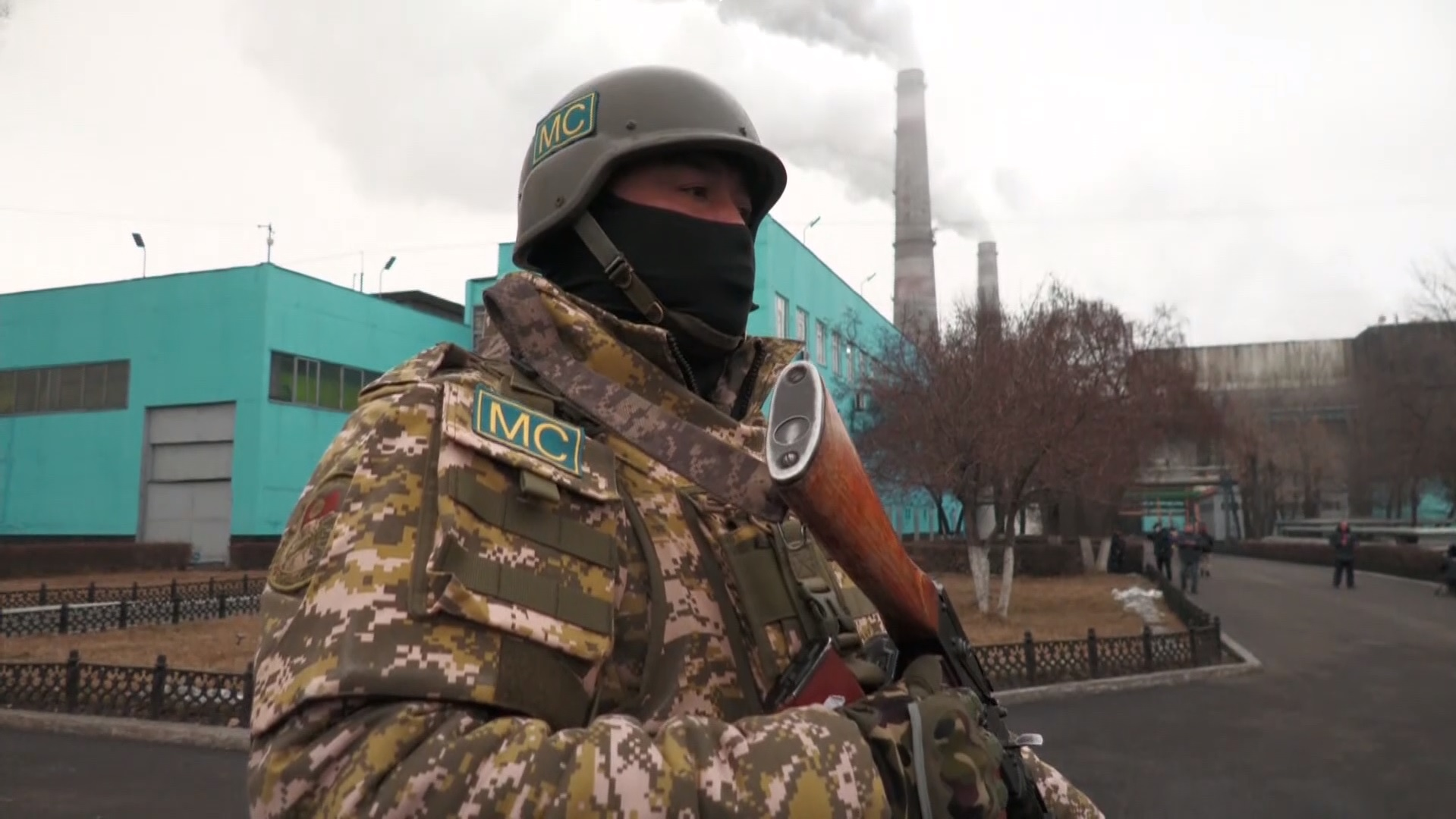
A Kyrgyz soldier from the brigade guarding the Almaty Power Station.

The brigade was founded on March 31, 1994, as the 525th Special Purpose company by order of the Minister of Defense Myrzakan Subanov. Many officers in the company received combat experience in Tajikistan and Democratic Republic of Afghanistan. In 1995, a detachment of the company underwent monthly training sessions with the United States Army Rangers at Fort Polk, Louisiana. The company was eventually expanded into a battalion, and later into a brigade with its current name. Between 1999–2000, the brigade participated in the Batken Conflict, turning the tide of many battles with the militants.

== Training ==
All officers who serve in the brigade are trained at the Ryazan Guards Higher Airborne Command School. Also, instructors from Russia and the United States Army are often invited to the brigade.

== Commanders ==
- Lieutenant Colonel Stanislav Kholodkov (1994–1996)
- Colonel Timur Dzhumanaliev (1996–1997)
- Colonel Artur Temirov (1997–2000)
- Colonel Akylbek Dononbaev (2000–2001)
- Colonel Asanbek Alymkozhoev (2001–2002)
- Colonel Taalaibek Omuraliev (2002–2004)
- Commandeer Talant Talipov (2015–2022)
