= Ismail Isakov =

Kyrgyzstani general (born 1950)

Lieutenant general Ismail Isakov
- Исмаил Исаков
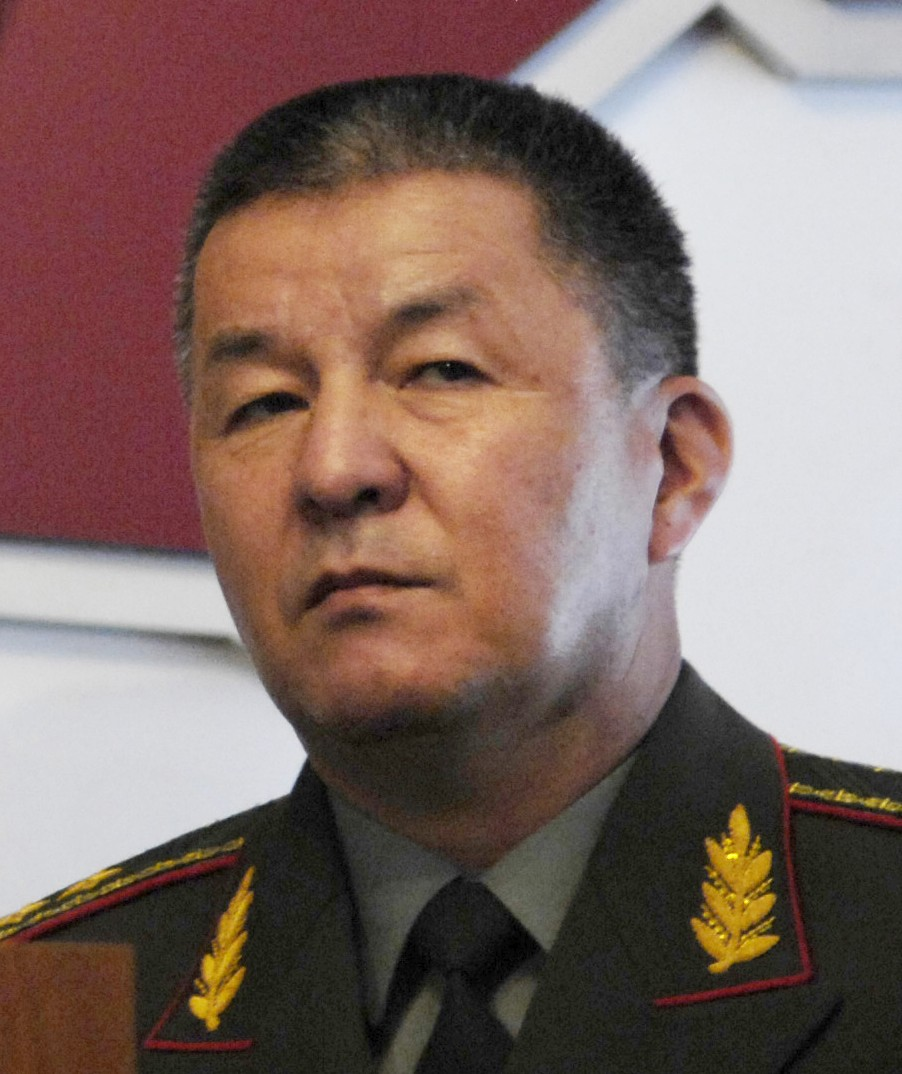
- Isakov in 2017

Minister of Defence
- In office Acting: 7 April 2010 – 20 July 2010
- President: Roza Otunbayeva
- Preceded by: Bakytbek Kalyev
- Succeeded by: Abibilla Kudayberdiev
- In office September 2005 – 26 May 2008; Acting: 24 March – September 2005
- President: Kurmanbek Bakiyev
- Preceded by: Esen Topoev
- Succeeded by: Bakytbek Kalyev

Personal details
- Born: 11 June 1950 (age 76) Sopu-Korgon, Kyrgyz SSR, Soviet Union

Military service
- Branch/service: Soviet Army; Kyrgyz Army
- Years of service: 1973-2010
- Rank: Lieutenant General

Ismail Isakovich Isakov (Kyrgyz: Исмаил Исакович (Исак уулу) Исаков, İsmail İsaqoviç (İsaq uulu) İsaqov born 11 June 1950) is a Kyrgyz politician and a Lieutenant General in the Armed Forces of the Republic of Kyrgyzstan.

== Early life and education ==
Ismail Isakov was born on 11 June 1950 in Sopu-Korgon. In 1966 he graduated from the Secondary School named after Toktogul Satylganov in the Alay District. In 1973 he graduated from the Tashkent Higher All-Arms Command School and served as commander of a motorized rifle platoon of the Southern Group of Forces. In 1984 he graduated from the Frunze Military Academy. From 1984 to 1992, he went from the chief of staff of the regiment to division chief of staff. In 1989, he graduated from the Vystrel course in Solnechnogorsk. In 1996 he studied at the Academy of the General Staff of the Russian Armed Forces (after which he received the rank of Major General) and the International Institute of Humanitarian Law in 1998.

== Career in Kyrgyz Army ==
From 1992 to 1994 he was appointed head of the combat training department of the Ministry of Defense. He carried out tasks to strengthen the Tajik-Afghan border as part of the collective peacekeeping forces in Tajikistan during the Tajikistani Civil War. From April 16 to 26, 1993, he headed the operational group to rescue captured soldiers from Afghanistan in the Qal'ai Khumb of Tajikistan. From 1994 to 1996 he held the position of Chief of the General Staff of the Armed Forces, and simultaneously from 1994 to 1999 he was First Deputy Minister of Defense of the Kyrgyz Republic. In August 1996, he participated in planning and conducted the first anti-terrorist exercise in the history of Kyrgyzstan.

== Political career ==
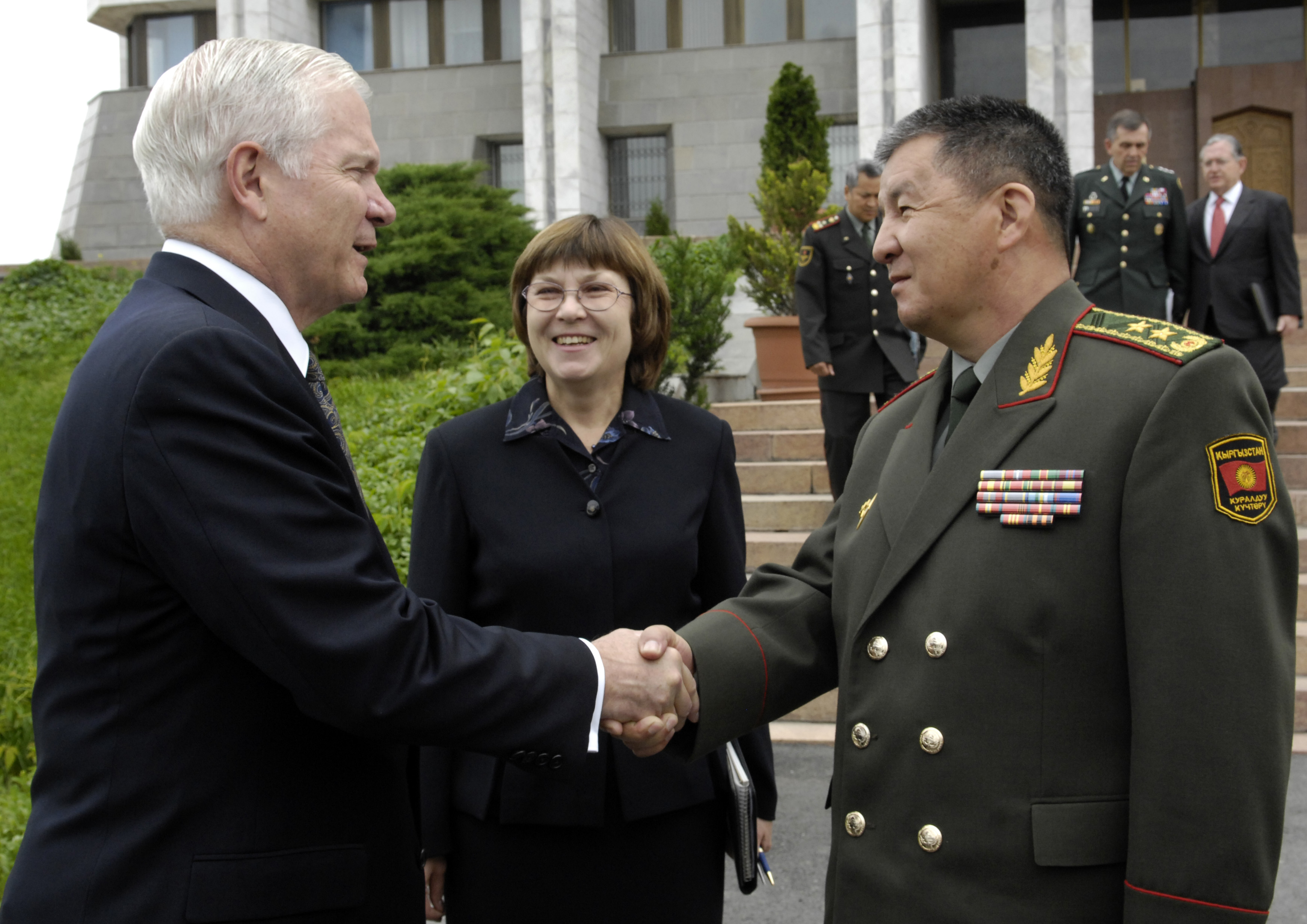
Isakov with Robert Gates in Bishkek in 2007.

From 2000 to 2005, he was a member of the Legislative Assembly of the Supreme Council. He represented the Alay Electoral District No. 29 in the Osh Region. He was Chairman of the Committee on State Security and Deputy Chairman of the Standing Committee on Foreign Relations, Security, and Regional Cooperation of the CIS Interparliamentary Assembly. In 2002, he became chief of staff and coordinator of the socio-political movement "For the resignation of A. Akayev - for reforms for the people."

== In the Bakiyev government ==
On 26 March 2005 he was made Acting Minister of Defense, and appointed Minister of Defense in September 2005. Isakov met with U.S. Defense Secretary Donald Rumsfeld in 2005, announcing the U.S. could continue to use the Manas Air Base in support of the war in Afghanistan. He served until 26 May 2008, when he was made Secretary of the Security Council of Kyrgyzstan. He was dismissed in October of that year.

== Post-government ==
In January 2010, he was convicted by the Bishkek Military Garrison Court for abuse of power and stripped of the rank of lieutenant general. After the Kyrgyz Revolution in April of that year, he was released and reinstated in his rank. He was appointed acting Minister of Defense of the Provisional Government of Kyrgyzstan under Roza Otunbayeva. He was then made the government's special representative for resolving the Osh Riots. On 10 November 2010 Isakov was sworn into the Supreme Council as a member of the Social Democratic Party of Kyrgyzstan (SDPK).

== Awards ==
- Order of Manas, II and III degrees (2011, 2018)
- Medal "For Military Merit" (USSR, February 18, 1981)
- Medal "For Impeccable Service" of three degrees
- Medal "For Strengthening Military Cooperation" (September 3, 2004) - fo
- Medal "For Strengthening Military Cooperation" (Kazakhstan, August 25, 2006)
- Certificate of Honor of the CSTO Collective Security Council ( October 6, 2007)
- Certificate of Honor of the CSTO Parliamentary Assembly (17 May 2012)
- "65th Anniversary of the Battle of Moscow" sign (2006)
- Badge "For Strengthening Military Cooperation" (Council of Ministers of Defense of the CIS, June 20, 2007)
- "15 Years of the Collective Security Treaty" badge (CSTO Secretary General, September 5, 2007)
- Personalized weapon (Government of the Kyrgyz Republic, May 27, 1993)
- Personalized weapon (Government of the Kyrgyz Republic, May 20, 2006)
- "For Distinction in Guarding the State Border", 1st Degree
- Special Chest Badge "Hero of the April People's Revolution" (November 30, 2011)
