= Taalaibek Omuraliev =

Kyrgyz major general

- Таалайбек Өмүралиев
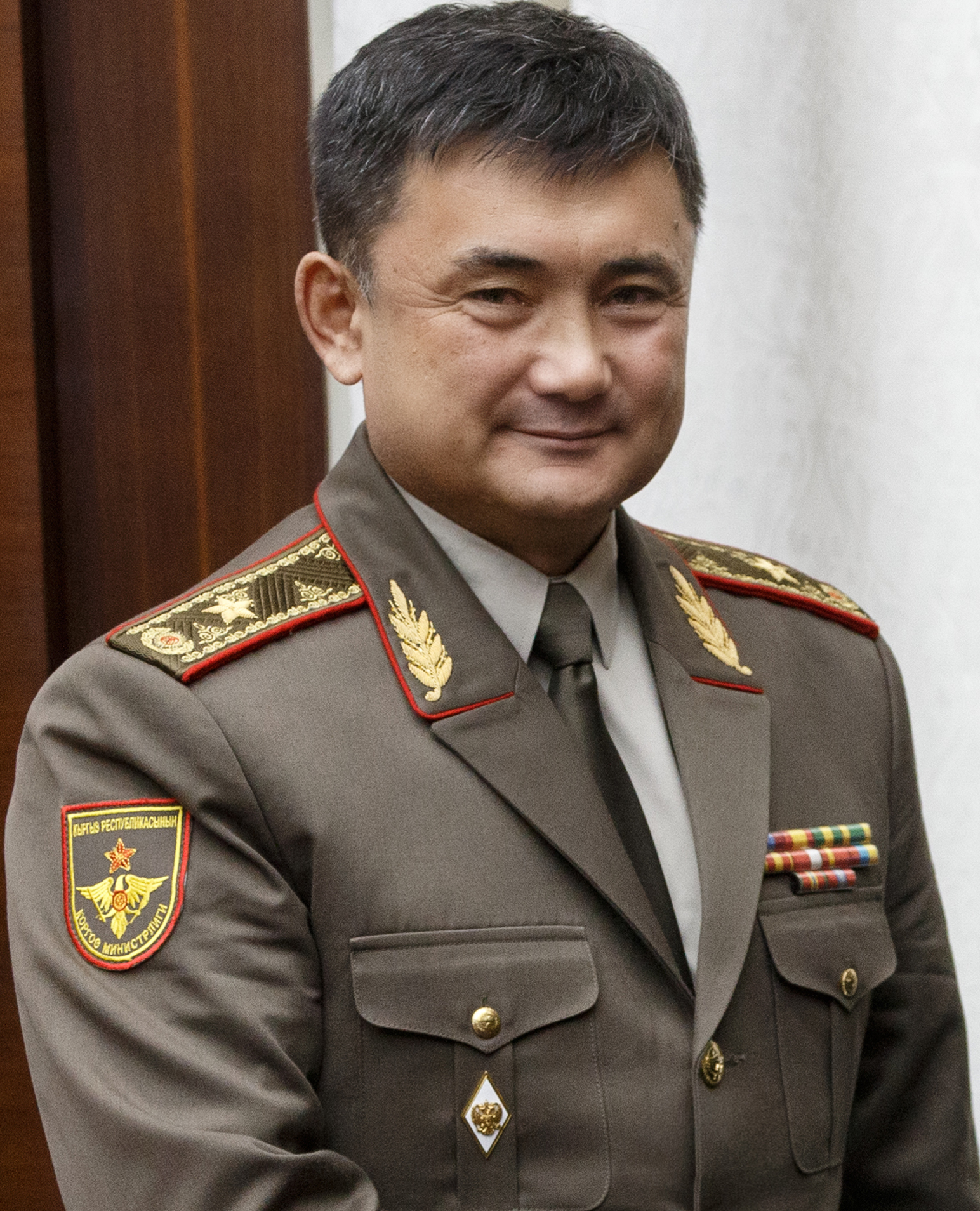
- Omuraliev in 2021

Minister of Defence
- In office 26 December 2011 – 4 April 2014
- President: Almazbek Atambayev
- Preceded by: Abibilla Kudayberdiev
- Succeeded by: Abibilla Kudayberdiev
- In office 3 February 2021 – 6 September 2021
- President: Sadyr Japarov
- Succeeded by: Baktybek Bekbolotov

Personal details
- Born: 2 May 1965 (age 61) Naryn, Kirghiz SSR, Soviet Union (now Kyrgyzstan)

Military service
- Allegiance: Soviet Union; Kyrgyzstan
- Branch/service: Soviet Army; Kyrgyz Army
- Years of service: 1982–2014; 2017–present
- Rank: Major general
- Commands: Southern Group of Forces

Taalaibek Baryktabasovich Omuraliev (Kyrgyz: Таалайбек Барыктабасович (Барыктабас уулу) Өмүралиев, romanized: Taalaybek Baryktabasovich (Baryktabas uulu) Ömüraliyev, Russian: Таалайбек Барыктабасович Омуралиев, romanized: Taalaybek Baryktabasovich Omuraliyev; born 2 May 1965) is a Kyrgyz major general and a former Minister of Defense of Kyrgyzstan. He also served briefly as the Chief of the General Staff twice.

== Early life and education ==
He was born in Naryn on May 2, 1965. From 1982-1986, he was a student at the Alma-Ata Higher All-Arms Command School named after Marshal Ivan Konev. He graduated from the Combined Arms Academy of the Russian Armed Forces in 2000 and in 2009, the Russian General Staff Military Academy.

== Career ==
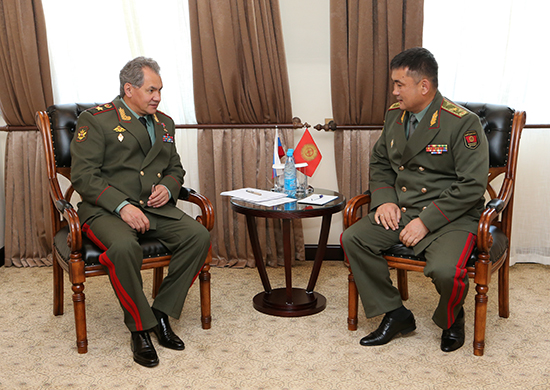
Omuraliev with Sergei Shoigu.

He was among the many soldiers from the Kyrgyz SSR to have served as part of the Limited Contingent of Soviet Troops in Afghanistan during the Soviet–Afghan War.

Between September 1986 and October 2005, he commanded various units in the Soviet Army and the Kyrgyz Army, including Scorpion 25th Special Forces Brigade. He also was a regimental commander in the 8th Guards Motor Rifle Panfilov Division and the Transbaikal Military District. During the Tajikistani Civil War, he commanded a joint border battalion that served in protecting the Afghanistan–Tajikistan border. In 1995, being named the commander of a high ranking, he took part in official events held in Paris on the occasion of the golden jubilee of the Victory in World War II on behalf of the Ministry of Defense. In the summer and autumn of 1999, Omuraliev was directly involved in the Batken Conflict and operations against the Islamic Movement of Uzbekistan. After serving at border posts in the Frontier Force and a special forces unit from Tokmok, he became the deputy head of the Bishkek Higher Military School of the Armed Forces of the Kyrgyz Republic (now the Military Institute of the Armed Forces of the Kyrgyz Republic), which he would remain as until March 2006.

=== Higher positions ===
In November 2009, he was appointed the Commander of the Southern Group of Forces of the Kyrgyz Army. From July 2010 to December 2011, he was the Chief of the General Staff of the Armed Forces. It was in this position that he led the army's response to the South Kyrgyzstan ethnic clashes. On December 26, 2011, Omuraliev was appointed Minister of Defense by president Almazbek Atambayev. He would keep that job until April 4, 2014 being succeeded by Abibilla Kudayberdiev. He was reappointed as Chief of the General Staff by President Sooronbay Jeenbekov during the 2020 Kyrgyzstan protests, replacing General Rayimberdi Duishenbiev. After President Sadyr Japarov order the recreation of the Defence Ministry, Omuraliev was appointed on 3 February 2021 to the post of Defence Minister in the cabinet of Ulukbek Maripov, the first since 2014.

== Criminal investigations ==
In 2014, the Military Prosecutor's Office inspected the distribution of service apartments to servicemen of the Ministry of Defense and the General Staff. Based on its results, charges were brought against Omuraliev under the articles abuse of power, forgery and negligence. In December 2017, the Birinchi May District Court issued a court decision to strip him of his rank of general and impose a large fine. In June 2017, the Judicial Collegium for Criminal Cases of the Bishkek City Court revised the previous court decision and restored his rank.

== Awards ==
- Order of the Red Star
- Medal "For Impeccable Service" I degree
