= Commander of the Army (Kyrgyzstan) =

Professional head of the Kyrgyz Army

Commander of the Kyrgyz Army
- Patch of Kyrgyz Armed Forces

- Standard of the Armed Forces
- Incumbent; Colonel Almazbek Karasartov since 19 January 2019
- Ministry of Defense
- Style: Comrade
- Status: Active
- Member of: General Staff of Armed Forces of the Kyrgyz Republic
- Reports to: Chief of the General Staff
- Residence: Bishkek
- Appointer: President of Kyrgyzstan
- Term length: No fixed length
- Constituting instrument: Constitution of Kyrgyzstan
- Precursor: Commanders-in-Chief of the Soviet Ground Forces
- Formation: 25 January 2017
- First holder: General Valentin Luk'yanov

The Commander of the Land Forces of the Armed Forces of the Kyrgyz Republic is the professional head of the Kyrgyz Army. He is responsible for the administration and the operational control of the Kyrgyz Army. The current Commander is Colonel Almazbek Karasartov.

== List of Chiefs ==
=== Kyrgyz Army ===
No.	Portrait	Commander of the Army	Took office	Left office	Time in office	Ref.
1	Valentin Luk'yanov	General; Valentin Luk'yanov	10 December 1993	?	?	

=== Kyrgyzstani Ground Forces ===
No.	Portrait	Commander of the Army	Took office	Left office	Time in office	Ref.
1	Erlis Terdikbayev	Colonel; Erlis Terdikbayev	25 January 2017	3 May 2018	1 year, 98 days	
2	Nurlan Kiresheyev	Colonel; Nurlan Kiresheyev	3 May 2018	19 January 2019	261 days	
3	Almazbek Karasartov	Colonel; Almazbek Karasartov	19 January 2019	Incumbent	7 years, 231 days	
