= Erlis Terdikbayev =

Kyrgyz major general

- Эрлис Тердикбаев

Chief of the General Staff
- In office 29 March 2021 – 2 October 2023
- President: Sadyr Japarov
- Preceded by: Taalaibek Omuraliev
- Succeeded by: Ruslan Mukambetov

Chairman of the State Committee for Defense Affairs
- In office 21 April 2018 – 3 February 2021
- President: Sooronbay Jeenbekov
- Preceded by: Mirbek Kasimkulov

Commander of the Kyrgyz Army
- In office 25 January 2017 – 21 April 2018
- President: Almazbek Atambayev; Sooronbay Jeenbekov
- Preceded by: Position established
- Succeeded by: Nurlan Kiresheyev

Personal details
- Born: 27 May 1969 (age 57) Chuy Region, Kirghiz SSR, Soviet Union (now Kyrgyzstan)
- Children: 3
- Education: Alma-Ata Higher All-Arms Command School (1986–1990); Combined Arms Academy of the Armed Forces of the Russian Federation (2002–2003); Military Academy of the General Staff of the Armed Forces of Russia (2003–2004)

Military service
- Allegiance: USSR; Kyrgyzstan
- Branch/service: Soviet Army; Kyrgyz Army
- Years of service: 1983 – present
- Rank: Major general

Erlis Jekshenovich Terdikbayev (Kyrgyz: Эрлис Джекшенович Тердикбаев; born 27 May 1969) is a Kyrgyzstani general and a former Chief of the General Staff of the Armed Forces of Kyrgyzstan.

== Early life and education ==
Erlis Terdikbayev was born on 27 May 1969 in the village of Issyk-Ata in the Chuy Region of the Kyrgyz SSR. He joined the Soviet Army in 1983, and graduated from the Alma-Ata Higher All-Arms Command School (now the Military Institute of the Kazakh Ground Forces) in 1990 after spending 4 years there as a cadet.

== Career ==
He served in a regiment of the Soviet Army's Transcaucasian Military District from June 1990 to June 1992. During the 1990s and the 2000s, Terdikbayev served in various military units of the poorly equipped Armed Forces of the Kyrgyz Republic.

He studied at the Combined Arms Academy of the Armed Forces of the Russian Federation and the Military Academy of the General Staff of the Armed Forces of Russia from 2002 to 2004. In 2017, he was appointed the commander of the newly formed Kyrgyz Land Forces.

On 21 April 2018 he replaced Colonel Mirbek Kasimkulov as the chairman of the State Committee for Defense Affairs as a result of Prime Minister Sapar Isakov's vote of no confidence by parliament.

He was dismissed on 3 February 2021 with the abolishment of his position. On 29 March, he became the new Chief of the General Staff. On March 31, he was promoted to major general (the highest rank in the Armed Forces of Kyrgyzstan).

== See also ==
- Ministry of Defense of the Kyrgyz Republic
- Kyrgyz Army
