= Asanbek Alymkozhoev =

Kyrgyz military commander

- Асанбек Алымкожоев
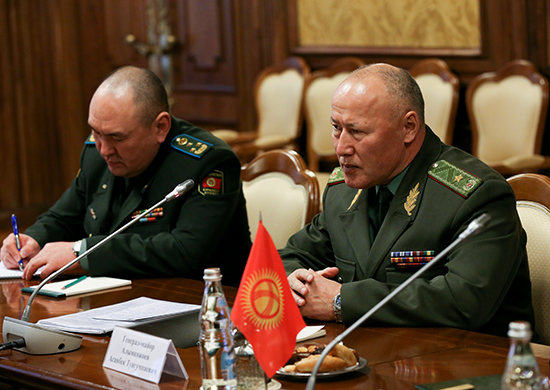

9th Chief of General Staff of Armed Forces of the Kyrgyz Republic
- In office 6 February 2014 – 5 November 2015
- President: Almazbek Atambayev
- Preceded by: Ilyazbek Subankulov
- Succeeded by: Janybek Kaparov

Personal details
- Born: 11 April 1956 (age 70) Chui Oblast, Kyrgyz SSR, Soviet Union
- Party: United Kyrgyzstan
- Children: 3

Military service
- Allegiance: Soviet Union; Kyrgyzstan
- Branch/service: Kyrgyz Army
- Years of service: 1977–2015
- Rank: Major General
- Battles/wars: Soviet-Afghan War; Batken Conflict

Asanbek Tunguchpaevich Alymkozhoev (Kyrgyz: Асанбек Тунгучпаевич Алымкожоев; born 11 April 1956) is the former Chief of General Staff of Armed Forces of the Kyrgyz Republic. He was also the commander of the National Guard of Kyrgyzstan from 2006 to 2009. and from 2013 to 2014.

== Early life and career ==
He was born on 11 April 1956 in the village of Sarban in the Chuy Region. Immediately after joining the Soviet Army in 1977, he commanded a reconnaissance platoon of the Central Asian Military District in the Kazakh Soviet Socialist Republic. Alymkozhoev fought in the Soviet-Afghan War from 1979 to 1981, serving in a reconnaissance company. For his actions during the war, he was awarded the Order of the Red Star after he left Afghanistan in 1981. He was then transferred to Kalinin, Russia where he became the city's regimental chief of military intelligence. From 1985 to 1992, Alymkozhoev was the deputy chief of staff, of the Ryazan GRU Brigade.

In 1992, Alymkozhoev returned to Kyrgyzstan, which at the time was independent from the USSR for one year. From 1992 to 1999 he was the commander of the special forces detachment of the Interior Ministry. From 1999 to 2000, he held the position of Deputy Head of the Main Directorate of Border Guard of the Ministry of Defense. During this period, he was deployed during the Batken Conflict. While in this position, he was awarded the Order of Manas 2nd and 3rd Degree for his contributions to the protection and strengthening of the state system. He studied at the Military Academy of the General Staff of the Armed Forces of Russia in 2000 and 2001.

== Later career ==
In 2001, he was appointed Commander of the Scorpion 25th Special Forces Brigade in Tokmok. In the mid to late-2000s, he commanded the Southern Group of Forces of the Defence Ministry, which was a position he held before becoming the Commander of the National Guard. He began working as the Deputy Head of the State Administration of Batken Region in December 2009 and served until the Kyrgyz Revolution of 2010. In July 2013, he was reappointed to his post in the National Guard.

On 6 February 2014, by decree of the President Almazbek Atambayev, he was appointed Chief of General Staff, succeeding Major General Ilyazbek Subankulov. He was the first chief to perform any functions after the military reforms which strengthened the hand of General Staff at the expense of the defense ministry. During the 70th anniversary Victory Day Parade on Ala-Too Square in May 2015, Alymkozhoev served as the presiding officer in place of President Atambayev who was in Moscow at the time. He was dismissed in November 2015 and was replaced by Janybek Kaparov in an acting capacity and permanently by Rayimberdi Duishenbiev in May 2016.

== Post military career ==
Alymkozhoev endorsed former Prime Minister Temir Sariev in the 2017 Kyrgyz presidential election, saying that he "has every chance to become the Kyrgyz Putin. He's a member of the United Kyrgyzstan political party.

== Awards ==
- Order of the Red Star
- Order of Manas, 3rd class (1999, for the 1st Batken War)
- Order of Manas, 2nd class. (for the battles at the Turo Pass during the Second Batken War)
