= Abdygul Chotbaev =

Kyrgyz general and politician (born 1957)

Commander of the National Guard of Kyrgyzstan
- In office 1992 – 24 August 2005
- President: Askar Akayev
- Preceded by: Office established
- Succeeded by: Sultan Kurmanov

Personal details
- Born: 2 December 1957 (age 68) Keminsky District, Kirghiz SSR, Soviet Union (now Kyrgyzstan)
- Spouse: Svetlana Abdykadyrovna

Military service
- Allegiance: USSR; Kyrgyzstan
- Branch/service: Soviet Army; Kyrgyz Armed Forces
- Years of service: 1975–present
- Rank: Colonel General

Colonel General Abdygul Abdrashitovich Chotbaev (Russian: Абдыгул Абдрашитович Чотбаев) is a retired Kyrgyz general and politician who served as the 1st Commander of the National Guard of Kyrgyzstan.

== Biography ==
=== Early life and military career ===
He was born in the village of Tert-Kül in the Chuy Region of Kirghizia to Abdrashit Supataev and his mother Zhanyl Budaychiev. He joined the Soviet Army, studying at the Alma-Ata Higher All-Arms Command School (now the Military Institute of the Kazakh Ground Forces) until he graduated in 1979. He also studied at the Frunze Military Academy in Moscow from 1985–1989. Upon graduating, the first time, he took up the post of platoon and company commander of a motorized rifle battalion. From 1980 to 1992, he served in various leadership positions, rising to the post of regimental commander in Uzbekistan. In 1989, he briefly served in the Democratic Republic of Afghanistan to aid in the Soviet withdrawal from Afghanistan.

=== National Guard ===
In July 1992, he was appointed to the post of Commander of the National Guard of Kyrgyzstan, the first person to hold this role. He did this after surrendering his Uzbek army positions and holding a meeting with President Akayev. In 1996, he graduated from Kyrgyz National University with a degree in jurisprudence. He served during the Batken Conflict of 1999, when militants of the Islamic Movement of Uzbekistan invaded Kyrgyzstan through the Batken Region. During this period, he was appointed as the commander of the joint task force that was assigned to deal with this threat.

=== Political and public career ===
While fulfilling both of these roles, he also served as a member of the Bishkek City Council from 1994 to 2000. In 2000, he was elected to the Jogorku Kenesh as part of the Party of War Veterans in Afghanistan and other Local Conflicts. During the events of the Tulip Revolution in March 2005, Chotbayev was at the White House compound where he attempted to negotiate with the anti-government rioters. When this strategy failed, the rioters beat and captured Chotbayev alongside the head of the presidential administration. He was dismissed from his role in the national guard as a result by the Security Council of Kyrgyzstan on 24 August 2005. Since September 2006, he has served as the Deputy Chairman of the Committee on the Affairs of Soldiers-Internationalists at the Council of Heads of Government of the CIS.

== Awards and promotions ==
- Order of Danaker (February 2004)
- Major General (1993)
- Order "For Merit to the Fatherland" (Russian Federation, 2004)
- Colonel General (2004)
- Order of Friendship (Russian Federation, 2010)
