= Military Institute of the Kazakh Ground Forces =

Training Institute of Kazakh Ground Forces

- Құрлық әскерлерінің әскери институты
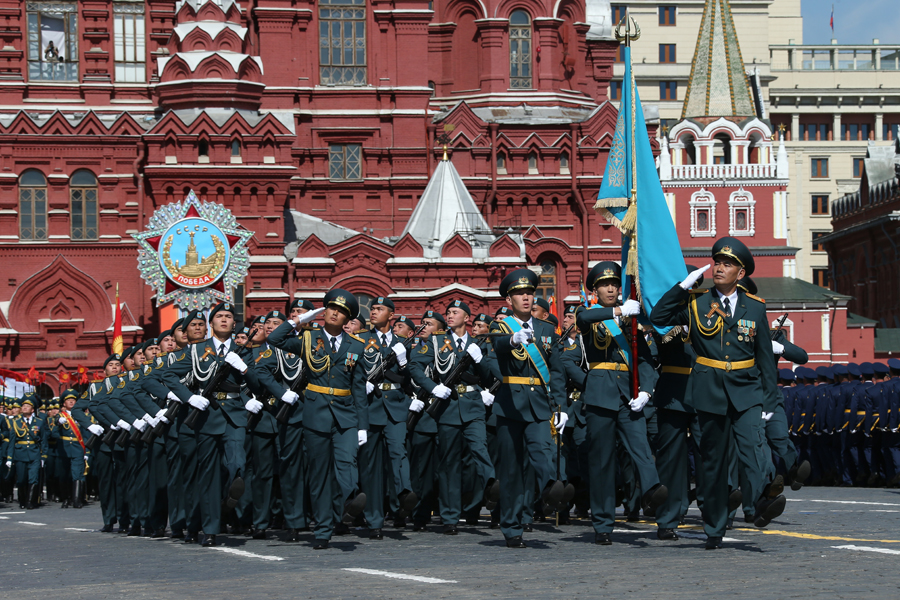
- Cadets marching on Red Square during the Moscow Victory Day Parade in May 2015.
- Former name: Alma-Ata Higher Combined Arms Command School
- Type: military academy
- Established: 1 September 1970
- Founder: Government of the Kazakh SSR
- Parent institution: Kazakh Ground Forces
- Affiliations: Armed Forces of Kazakhstan
- Director: Major General Bauyrzhan Ibatulin
- Location: 35 Krasnogorskaya Street, Almaty, Kazakhstan
- Accronym: QÄÄÏ / VISV
- Colors
- Website: visv.edu.kz

The Sagadat Nurmagambetov Military Institute of the Kazakh Ground Forces (Kazakh: Құрлық әскерлерінің әскери институты; Qūrlyq äskerlerınıñ äskeri instituty), formerly known as the Alma-Ata Higher Combined Arms Command School (Russian: Алма-Атинское высшее общевойсковое командное училище), is one of the leading educational institutions in the military education system of the Kazakh Ground Forces. The military academy is based in Almaty, Kazakhstan.

== History ==
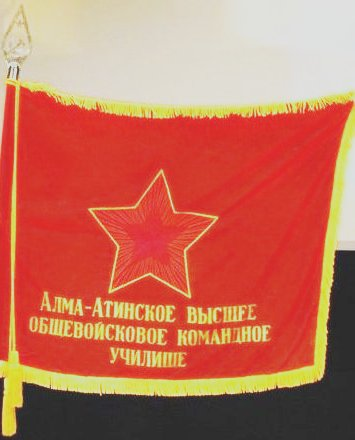
The banner of the command school.

=== Soviet Union ===
The Military Institute of Land Forces history began from the Alma-Ata Higher Combined Arms Command School, which had been established on 1 September 1970 on the grounds of the Resolution of the Presidium of the Supreme Soviet of the USSR. It was formed on the basis of the 186th Motor Rifle Regiment of the 68th Motor Rifle Division in the 13th Military Garrison of Alma-Ata. Due to the fact that with the opening of the school, cadets continued their studies for the 2nd year of study, the first graduation of lieutenants took place on 25 July 1973. By order of the Minister of Defense Andrei Grechko on 1 July 1973, the school was named after the Marshal of the Soviet Union Ivan Konev. In the 1980s, a significant number of ABOKU graduates was sent to serve in Afghanistan.

=== Independence ===
After the collapse of the USSR, the school remained an official academic institution of the Republic of Kazakhstan. On 11 February 1997, by the decree of President Nursultan Nazarbayev, the school was reorganized into the Military Institute of the Land Forces. By late February 2002, remnants of the former school were separated from the military academy. On 31 October 2003, the school was renamed the Military Institute of the Ground Forces. On 11 September 2020, it was given a special honorific which made it full name the "Military Institute of the Ground Forces named after Hero of the Soviet Union, People's Hero, the first Minister of Defense of Kazakhstan, General of the Army Sagadat Nurmagambetov".

== Multidisciplinary training ==
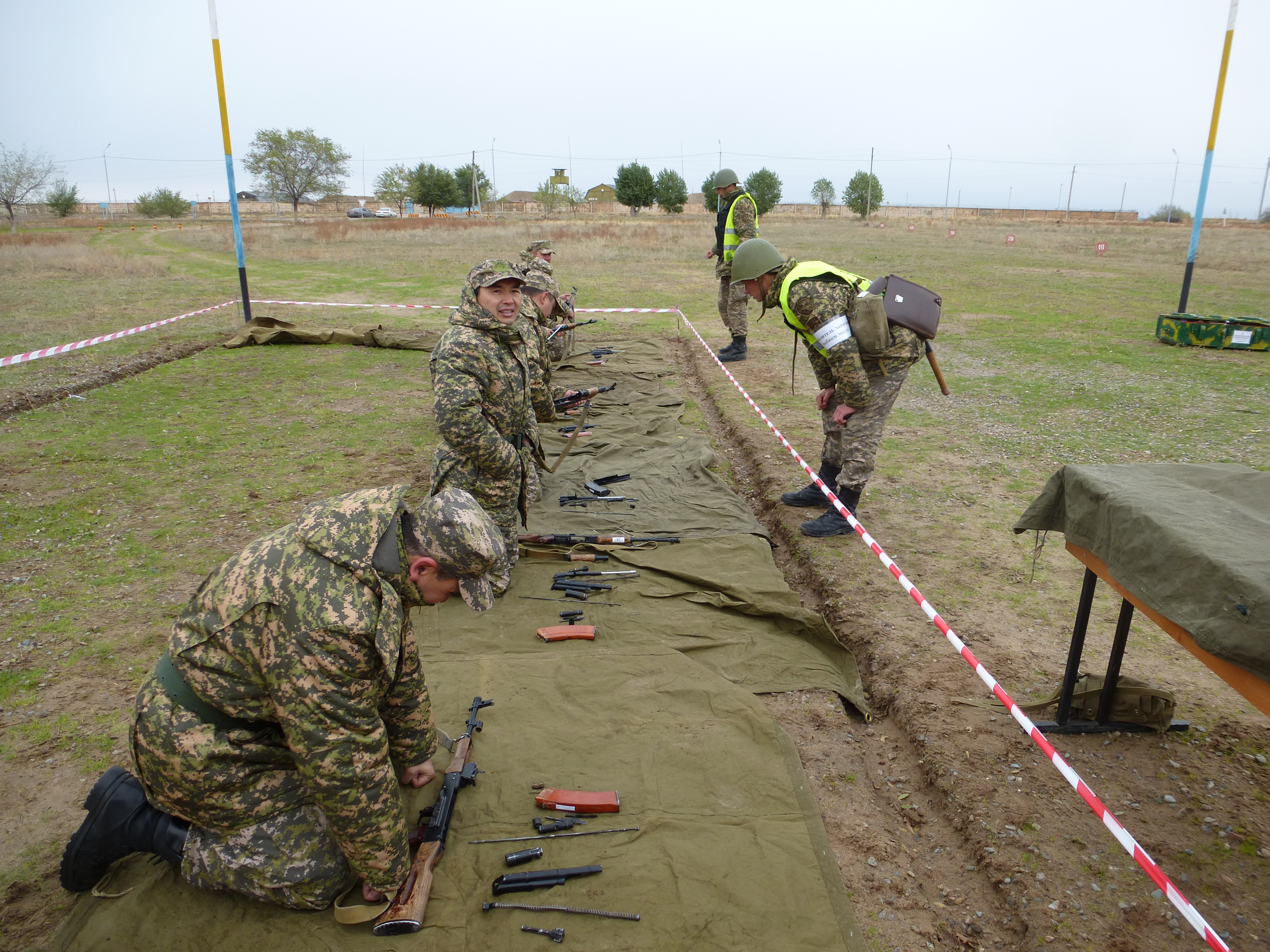
Cadets (in yellow vests) conduct fire training with reservists.

Due to the fact that there were no military schools in the Kazakh SSR that trained officers for the Soviet Army with the exception of the ABOKU, the leadership of armed forces created faculties on the basis of the ABOKU to train officers in other specialties. Currently, the Military Institute is training officers in 13 specialties under the program of a higher military educational institution with a training period of four years:

- Command
  - Motorized rifle troops
  - Airborne troops and military intelligence
  - Tank troops
  - Artillery troops
- Specialties in combat support
  - Engineer troops
- Specialties in logistics support
  - Missile and artillery support of troops
  - Motor vehicle support
  - Food supply
  - Clothing support
  - Combustive-lubricating support
  - Repair and maintenance
- Officers of educational structures
- Military translation business

== Foreign Cooperation ==
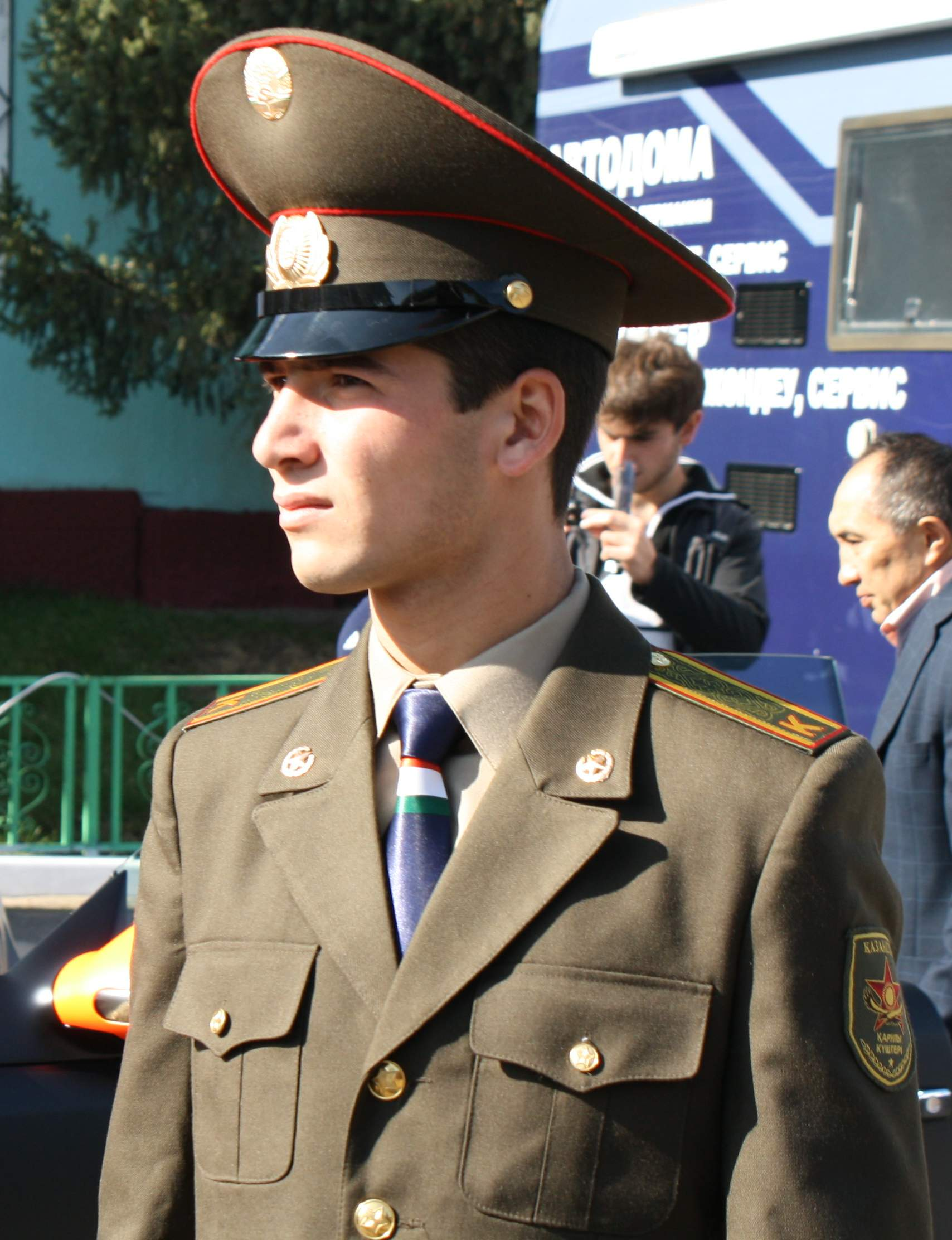
A cadet from Tajikistan studying at the academy, October 2009.

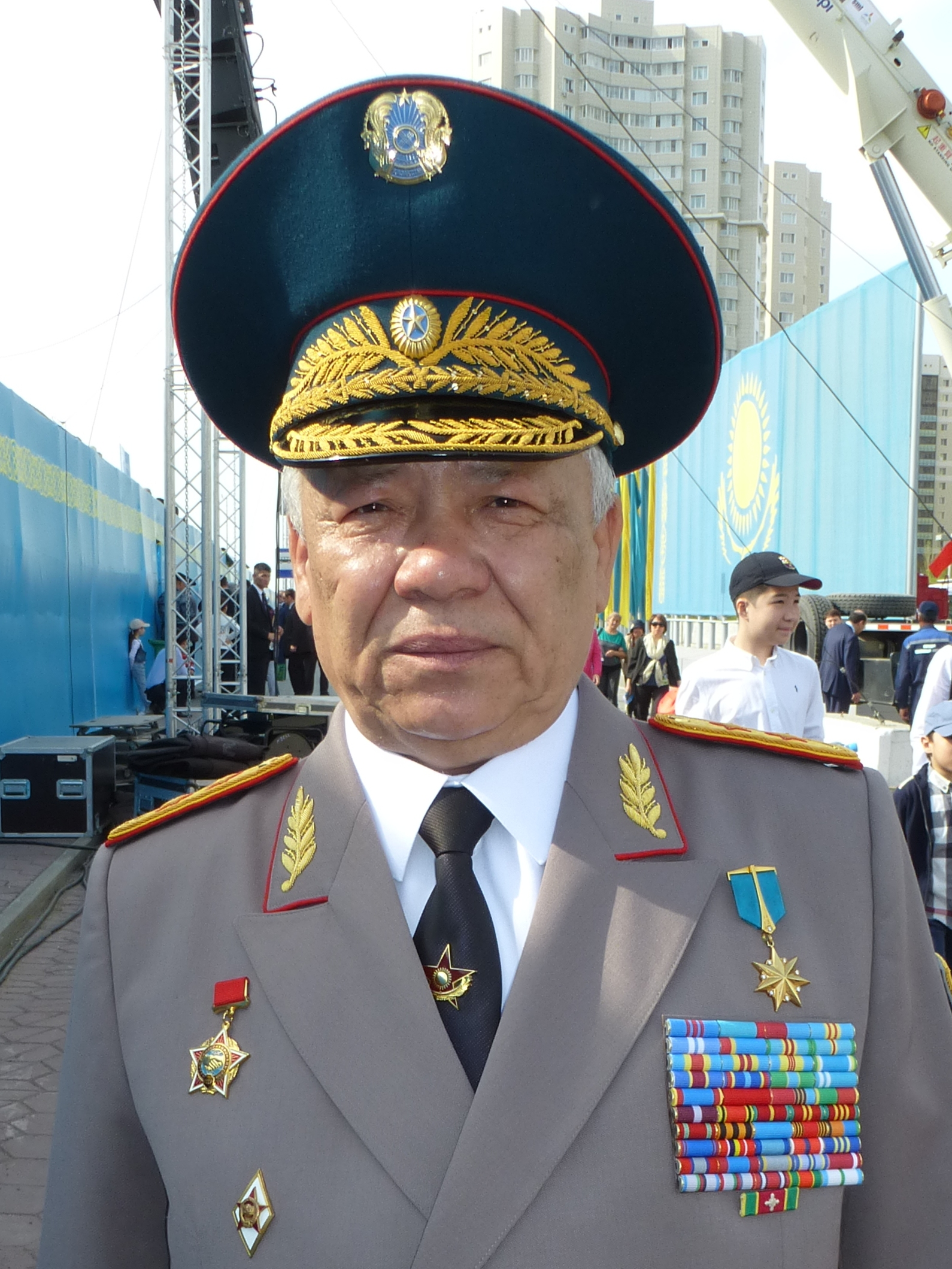
Former rector of the institute Bakhytzhan Ertaev.

Due to the fact that Kazakhstan, which is a member of the Collective Security Treaty Organization, associate members like Tajikistan, which only has the Military Institute of the Ministry of Defense, can according to interstate agreements, attend courses at the institute. According to the said agreements, annually sends 7-10 special soldiers for training. For example, in 2019, nine officers of the Armed Forces of the Kyrgyz Republic and 10 officers of the Armed Forces of the Republic of Tajikistan graduated from the Military Institute. In July 2008, in a Kazakhstan-NATO cooperation plan, the first Partnership for Peace training center in Central Asia called the Kazakhstan Center (Kazcent) was opened in the Military Institute of Ground Forces. The center’s main objective is to train the relevant military personnel designated to participate in peacekeeping operations, and its curriculum includes courses on English military terminology in multinational operations, NATO administrative procedures, and military-civilian interaction.

Many cadets of the Foreign Language Department at the United States Military Academy at West Point on their Foreign Academy Exchange Program spend their time at the institute.

== Rectors ==
The following are a list of rectors:

- Major General Vachakan Vlasov (1970-1978)
- Lieutenant General Anatoly Nekrasov (1978-1988)
- Major General Vladimir Ponomarev (1988-1992)
- Lieutenant General Abay Tasbulatov (1992-2002)
- Lieutenant General Bakhytzhan Ertaev (February–March 2002)
- Major General Alikhan Jarbulov (March 2002-November 2003)
- Major General Manas Sikhimov (December 2003-February 2005)
- Colonel Jomart Kuangaliev (February 2005 – 2007)
- Major General Alikhan Jarbulov (2007-January 2009)
- Major General Sabit Kudaibergenov (January 2009-October 2011)
- Major General Askan Tasbulatov (October 2011-February 2013)
- Major General Nikolai Kuatov (February 2013-October 2014)
- Major General Vasiliy Ryspaev (October 2014-October 2016)
- Colonel Serik Asanov (October 2016–July 2018)
- Lieutenant General Kurban Karazhanov (July 2018 - November 2018)
- Major General Askhat Ryspaev (November 2018 - August 2019)
- Major General Dulat Adyrbekov (December 2019 - April 2022)
- Major General Bauyrzhan Ibatulin (April 2022–present)

== Notable alumni ==
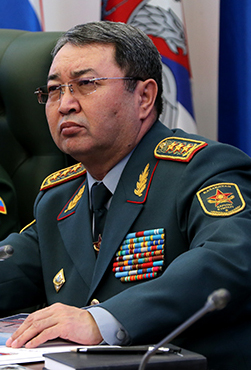
Saken Zhasuzakov was a cadet of the school in 1978.

=== Alumni from Kazakhstan ===
- Yuri Ilyin - Minister of Emergency Situations from 11 September 2020 to 10 June 2023.
- Abai Tasbolatov - Former Deputy Chair of the Mäjilis
- Ruslan Jaqsylyqov - First Deputy Secretary of the Security Council of Kazakhstan
- Saken Zhasuzakov - Former Minister of Defense of Kazakhstan
- Murat Maikeyev - Former Chief of the General Staff of the Armed Forces of the Republic of Kazakhstan
- Malik Sarapov - Chairmen of the Joint Chiefs of Staff of the Armed Forces of Kazakhstan from 2001 to 2003.
- Bakhytzhan Ertaev - Former Chief of the General Staff of the Armed Forces of the Republic of Kazakhstan
- Talgat Berdigulov - Former Director of the Presidential Orchestra of the State Security Service of the Republic of Kazakhstan.
- Kanat Azimbaev - Former Head of the Honor Guard of the Republican Guard of Kazakhstan

=== Alumni from Russia ===
- Pavel Popov - Deputy Minister of Defense between 7 November 2013 and 17 June 2024.
- Yury Em - Member of the State Duma between 2011 and 2012, and between 2014 and 2016.

=== Alumni from Central Asia ===
- Abibilla Kudayberdiev - Former Minister of Defense of Kyrgyzstan
- Mels Bekboev - Former Chief of the General Staff of Armed Forces of Kyrgyzstan
- Erlis Terdikbayev - Former Chief of the General Staff of Armed Forces of Kyrgyzstan
- Abdygul Chotbaev - The 1st Commander of the National Guard of Kyrgyzstan

=== Other alumni ===
- Movses Hakobyan - Former Chief of General Staff of Armenian Armed Forces
- Mirab Kishmaria - Former Minister of Defence of Abkhazia
- Ihor Plakhuta - Commander of the Ukrainian Territorial Defence Forces

== See also ==
- West Point
- Bundeswehr Command and Staff College
- Hetman Petro Sahaidachnyi National Ground Forces Academy
