= Council of Ministers of Defense of the CIS =

Military coordination body of the Commonwealth of Independent States

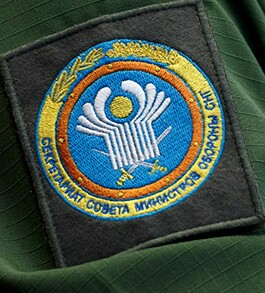
The emblem of the Secretariat of the Council of Ministers of the CIS.

The Council of Ministers of Defense of the CIS (Russian: Совет министров обороны СНГ, СМО СНГ) is a working body in the Commonwealth of Independent States responsible for military policy of the CIS. It coordinates military cooperation of the CIS member states, and develops military and defense policy of the CIS.

== Chairmen ==
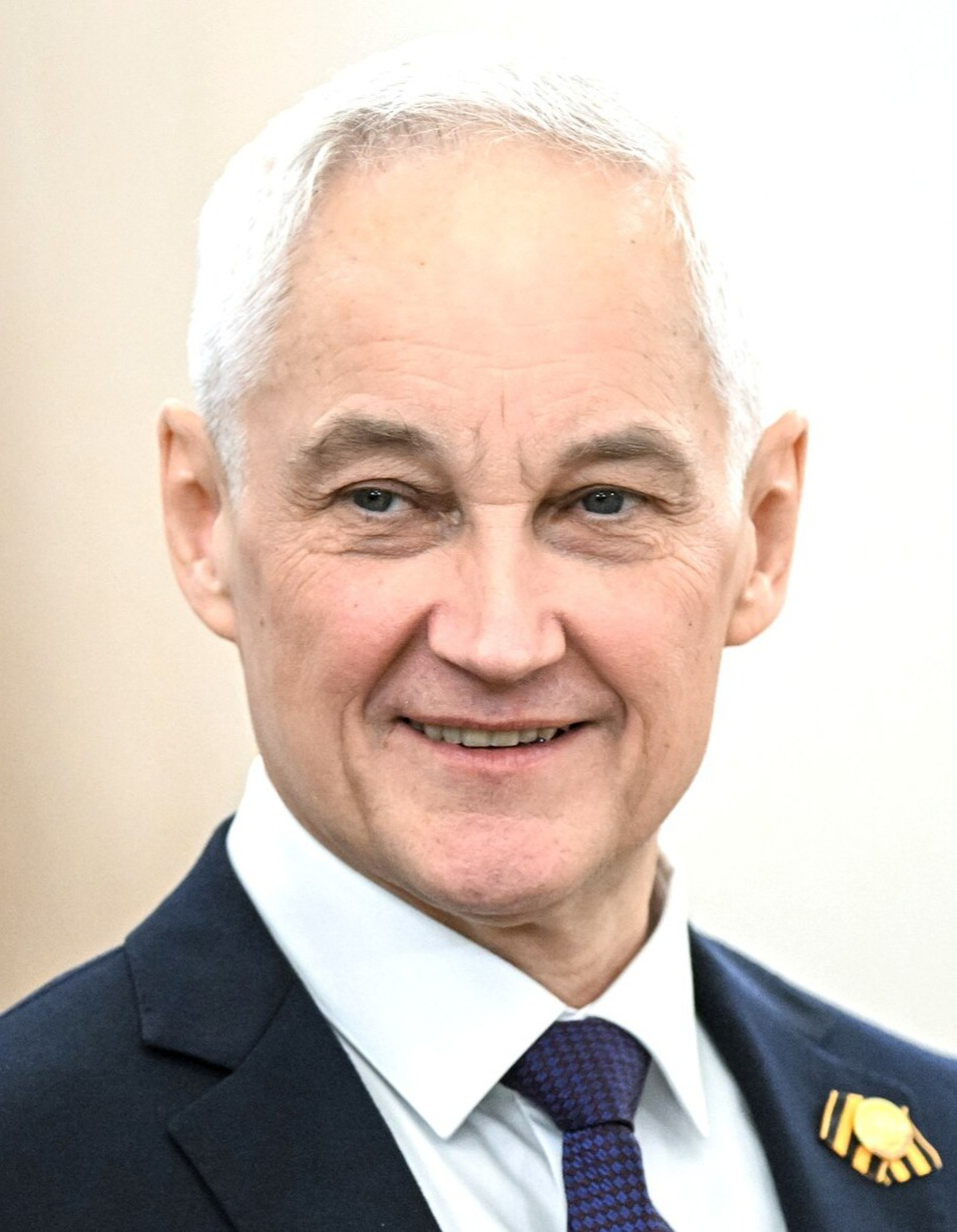
Russian Defense Minister Andrey Belousov is the current chairman of the council.

With the exception of Colonel General Kostyantyn Morozov of the Ministry of Defence of Ukraine, the post of Chairman of the Council of Ministers of the CIS has historically been concurrent with the post of Minister of Defence of the Russian Federation.

- Kostyantyn Morozov (22 December 1991 – 18 May 1992)
- Pavel Grachev (18 May 1992 – 17 June 1996)
- Igor Rodionov (17 July 1996 – 23 May 1997)
- Igor Sergeyev (23 May 1997 – 28 March 2001)
- Sergei Ivanov (28 March 2001 – 15 February 2007)
- Anatoliy Serdyukov (15 February 2007 – 7 May 2012)
- Sergei Shoigu (11 December 2012 – 3 July 2024)
- Andrey Belousov (3 July 2024 – Present)

== Current members ==
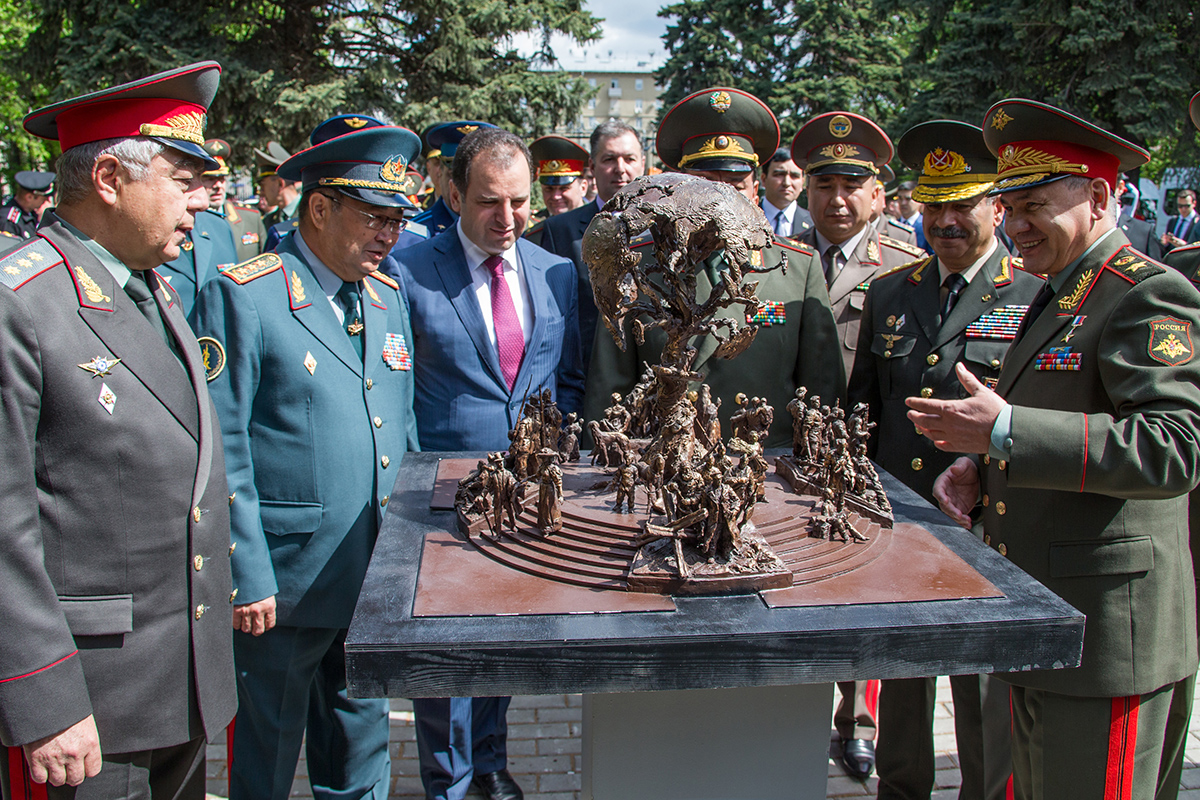
General Sergei Shoigu, former chairman of the CoM of the CIS, during a presentation in Alexander Garden to members of the council during its 2017 anniversary session.

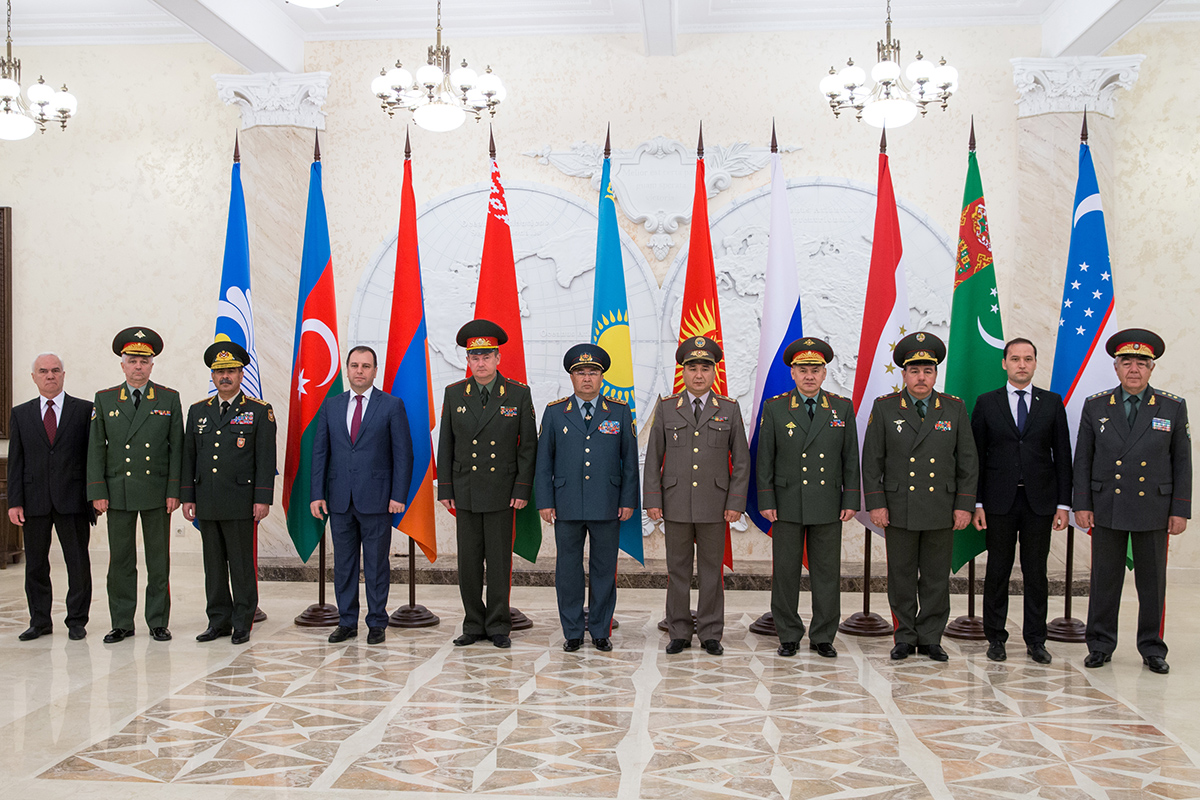
The members of the council meeting in Moscow in 2017.

Country	Minister	Rank	Photo
Armenia	Suren Papikyan	N/A (Civilian)	
Azerbaijan	Zakir Hasanov	Colonel general	
Belarus	Viktor Khrenin	Lieutenant general	
Kazakhstan	Aidos Myrzahmetov	Major general	
Kyrgyzstan	Ruslan Mukambetov	Major general	
Russia	Andrey Belousov	1st class Active State Councillor	
Tajikistan	Emomali Sobirzoda	Lieutenant general	
Uzbekistan	Shukhrat Kholmukhamedov	Major general	

=== Observer states ===
Country	Minister	Rank	Photo
Turkmenistan	Begenç Gündogdyýew	Lieutenant general	

== Subordinates ==
- Air Defense Coordination Committee
  - Joint CIS Air Defense System
- Coordinating Committee on Field Training

== Sessions ==
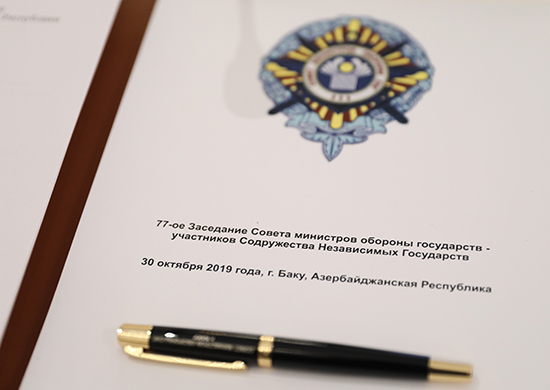
A document for the 77th session of the council, Baku, 30 October 2019.

No.	Country	City	Host
1st	Russia	Moscow	Pavel Grachev
59th	Ukraine	Partenit	Mykhailo Yezhel
60th	Russia	Sochi	Anatoly Serdyukov
61st	Kazakhstan	Almaty	Adilbek Zhaksybekov
62nd	Russia	Kaliningrad	Anatoly Serdyukov
63rd	Russia	Moscow	Sergey Shoygu
64th	Belarus	Minsk	Yuri Zhadobin
65th	Russia	Moscow	Sergey Shoygu
66th	Kazakhstan	Astana	Serik Akhmetov
67th	Russia	Moscow	Sergey Shoygu
68th	Kyrgyzstan	Cholpon-Ata	Abibilla Kudayberdiev
69th	Russia	Moscow	Sergey Shoygu
70th	Russia	Moscow	Sergey Shoygu
71st	Russia	Moscow	Sergey Shoygu
72nd	Russia	Moscow	Sergey Shoygu
73rd	Tajikistan	Dushanbe	Sherali Mirzo
74th	Russia	Kyzyl	Sergey Shoygu
75th	Uzbekistan	Tashkent	Abdusalom Azizov
76th	Russia	Anapa	Sergey Shoygu
77th	Azerbaijan	Baku	Zakir Hasanov

== See also ==
- Commonwealth of Independent States
