= Esen Topoev =

Kyrgyz general

General of the Army Esen Topoev
- Эсен Топоев
- Born: 28 February 1952 (age 74); Batken, Kirghiz SSR, Soviet Union (now Kyrgyzstan)
- Military career
- Allegiance: USSR; Russia; Kyrgyzstan
- Branch: Armed Forces of Kyrgyzstan
- Service years: 1969–2005
- Rank: General of the Army
- Conflicts: Batken Conflict

Esen Tolenovich Topoev (Kyrgyz: Эсен Толенович Топоев; born 28 February 1952) is a Kyrgyz general and the former Minister of Defense of Kyrgyzstan.

== Career ==
=== Soviet Army service ===
He was born on 28 February 1952 in the city of Kyzyl-Kiya. He joined the Soviet Army in 1969 and studied at the Tashkent Higher All-Arms Command School before graduating in 1973. He was immediately sent to the Hungarian People's Republic where he was commander of a motorized rifle platoon in the Southern Group of Forces. He was recalled three years later to serve in the North Caucasus Military District in southern Russia as a regimental commander. He graduated from the Frunze Military Academy (now the Combined Arms Academy of the Armed Forces of the Russian Federation) in 1985. From then on until the fall of the Soviet Union, he served in various units in eastern Russia including a rifle unit in Blagoveshchensk.

=== Studies and service in Russia ===
In the early and mid 1990s, he was an officer in the Russian Armed Forces during which he also continued his studies. From 1992-93, he was the Deputy Commander of the 8th Motor Rifle Division in the Far Eastern Military District. He graduated from the Military Academy of the General Staff of the Armed Forces of Russia.

=== Return to Kyrgyzstan ===
He returned in 1995 and immediately became the Chief of the General Staff of the Armed Forces of the Kyrgyz Republic, a position he would stay in until 1999. The year he was dismissed was also the year in which he briefly served as the Head of the State Security Service and concurrently as the Secretary of the Security Council of Kyrgyzstan. Soon after the start of the Batken Conflict, he was deployed into the war zone. On 29 August 1999, Topoev, a Major General at the time, was appointed Minister of Defense to replace General Myrzakan Subanov after what the government called a failure to "stabilize the situation" by Subanov. As a result of his appointment, he led all of the military operations in the subsequent stages of the operation.

He presided over the opening of the Russian Armed Forces Kant Air Base in October 2003. During a meeting with a visiting an American delegation, Topoev criticized at the US's role in the war on terror by quipping, "Tell your President in America that he should be careful who he sells arms to. This happened to you because America gave weapons to Afghanistan and Pakistan to fight the Soviets." Having become one of the closest officials to President Askar Akayev, Topoev rapidly rose in military ranks, becoming a Lieutenant General two months after his appointment before becoming a Colonel General in 2002 and a General of the Army in August 2004 (the only such person with this military rank in independent Kyrgyzstan). During the US-sponsored Tulip Revolution in 2005, he tendered his letter of resignation to Prime Minister Bakiyev and immediately left the country.

== Post-government ==
According to media reports, Topoev currently lives in Moscow where he is in exile as an adviser to general director of JSC Rosoboronexport.
