= Military Institute of the Armed Forces of the Kyrgyz Republic =

Military academy in Bishkek, Kyrgyzstan

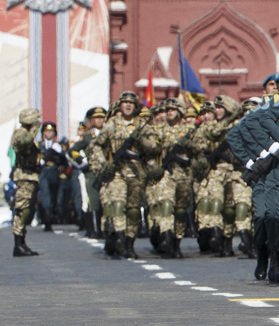
- Cadets of the institute during the 2020 Moscow Victory Day Parade.
- Former name: Odessa Military Aviation Pilots School (original)
- Type: military academy
- Established: 1941
- Founders: Government of Kyrgyzstan
- Rector: Colonel Ruslan Sharshembiev
- Address: 6 Patrice Lumumba Street, Bishkek, Kyrgyzstan
- Language: Kyrgyz, Russian
- Website: Military Institute
- Its full name is the Military Institute of the Armed Forces of the Kyrgyz Republic named after Hero of the Soviet Union Lieutenant-General Kalyinur Usenbekov

The Military Institute of the Armed Forces of the Kyrgyz Republic (Kyrgyz: Кыргыз Республикасынын Куралдуу Күчтөрүнүн Аскердик институту, Russian: Военный институт Вооруженных Сил Кыргызской Республики) is the main military academy of the Kyrgyz Republic. which prepares highly qualified officers for the General Staff of Armed Forces.

== History ==
In December 1941, the Odessa Military Aviation Pilots School was relocated to Frunze (now Bishkek), the capital of the Kirghiz Soviet Socialist Republic. Many graduates of the school were sent to form the 651st Fighter Aviation Regiment. In June 1947, the school was renamed the Frunze Military School of Pilots of the Soviet Air Force. It was originally base in an area which is today the Russian Air Force's Kant air base in the Ysyk-Ata District of the Chüy Region. From 1945 to 1947, 2,573 fighter pilots were trained. In 1995, the school was renamed the Bishkek Military Aviation Airborne Technical School. Between 1994 and 2000, the school produced 535 senior officers for aviation specialties. Since 1998, border officer training has operated among the cadets of BVALTU. On August 15, 2000, the Bishkek Military Aviation Aircraft Technical School was transformed into the Bishkek Higher Military School, and in 2005 it was renamed in honor Hero of the Soviet Union Lieutenant-General Kalyinur Usenbekov. In 2009, by decree of President Kurmanbek Bakiyev, the Bishkek Higher Military School was transformed into the Military Institute of the Armed Forces with a new training term of 5 years.

== Cadet life ==
Students at the institute with high academic grades are entitled to a stipend of about 12 dollars.

=== Building ===
The building of the institute is located on Patrice Lumumba Street in Bishkek. In a meeting with the Kyrgyz ambassador in 2018, Turkish Minister of National Defense Hulusi Akar announced that Turkey would allocate money for construction of a new building of the institute.

=== Activities ===
On 4 February 2019, a meeting timed to coincide with the 76th anniversary of the victory in the Battle of Stalingrad was held at the Russian Center of Science and Culture, with guests including cadets and teachers at the institute. A contingent of cadets from the institute a planned to take part in a Victory Day Parade in Yekaterinburg on 9 May 2020. This plan was later scrapped in favor of sending cadets of the institute under the command of its Deputy Head, Colonel Bekkazy Tumenbaev, to Moscow to participate in the Moscow Victory Day Parade During the parade, it carried the combat banner of the 8th Guards Motor Rifle Division.

== Organization ==
The Military Institute has 4-year program of study with the end result being the attainment of the rank of Lieutenant (лейтенант) as well as a bachelor's degree in the following specialties:

- Tactical training
- Technical training
- Fire training
- Humanitarian disciplines
- Physical training and sports
- Natural Science Disciplines
- National and foreign languages (study of Russian, English, German, French and Turkish)
- Border Activities

In September 2013, the institute opened a class for the study of the Russian language within the framework of the Grant Agreement allocated by the Ministry of Defense of Russia.

== Notable alumni and people associated with the school ==
- Hafez al-Assad, 18th President of Syria
- Hosni Mubarak, 4th President of Egypt
- Ahmed Husseinn, Commander of the Air Force of Mozambique
- Air Marshal Dilbah Singh, Commander of the Indian Air Force from 1981 to 1984.
- Shakeeb Khobani, South Yemeni Brigadier Pilot
- Fabian Msimang, Chief of the South African Air Force
- Jügderdemidiin Gürragchaa, the first Mongolian in space and Defense Minister of Mongolia from 2000-2004.
- Abibilla Kudayberdiev, former Minister of Defense and reactor of the institute from 2008 to 2009.
- Artur Temirov, former Commander of the 8th Guards Motor Rifle Division and rector of the institute
- Mohammad Dawran, former MiG-21 pilot of the DRAAF’s 322nd Air Regiment and former commander of the Afghan Air Force
- Ruslan Sharshembiev, head of the institute and former Commandant of the Bishkek Garrison
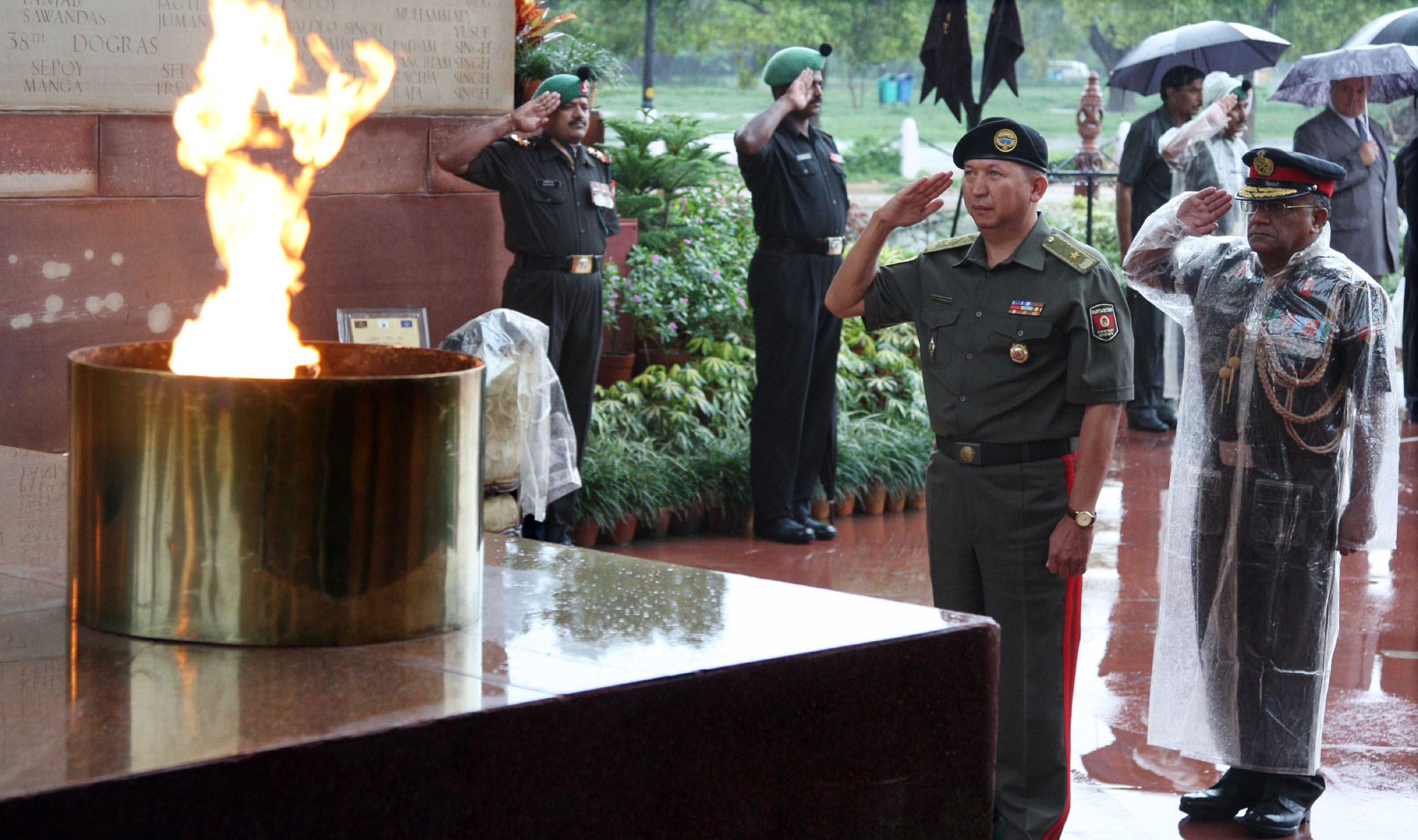
Abibilla Kudaberdiev rendering a hand salute at Amar Jawan Jyoti in New Delhi, 9 September 2011.

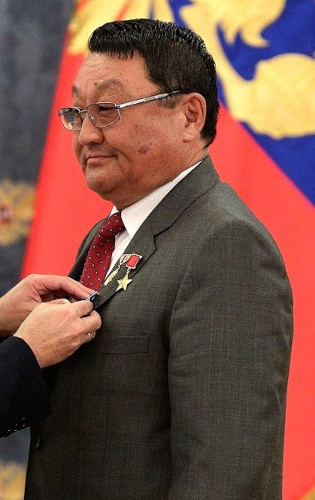
Jügderdemidiin Gürragchaa

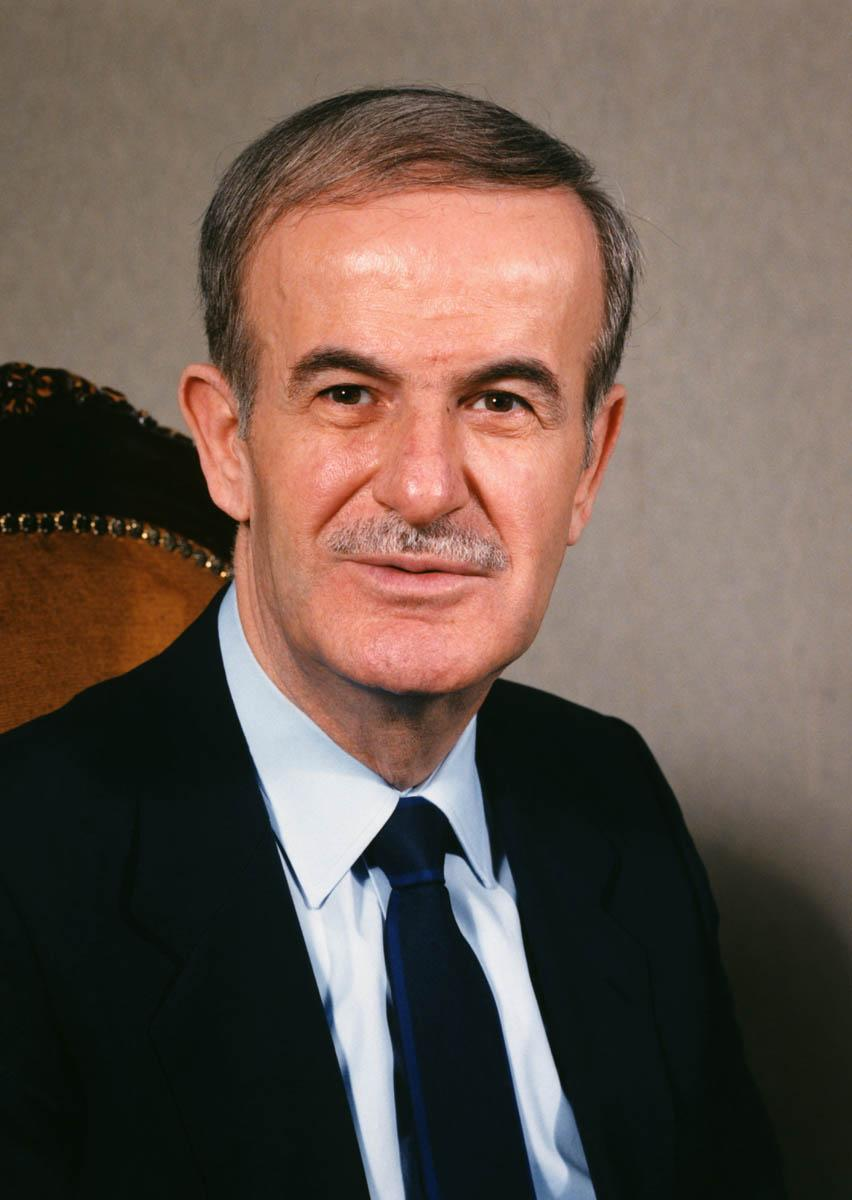
Hafez al-Assad

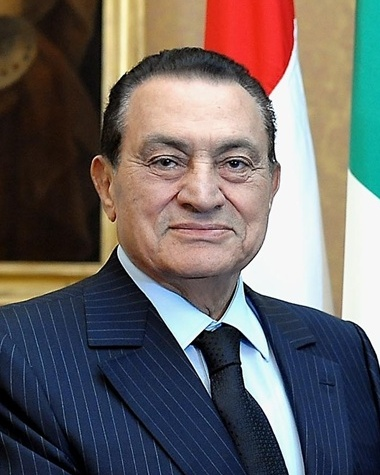
Hosni Mubarak
