= Mels Bekboev =

Kyrgyz military officer and politician (1952–2026)

- Мэлс Бекбоев

Chief of the General Staff of Armed Forces of Kyrgyzstan
- In office August 2004 – January 2006
- President: Askar Akayev; Kurmanbek Bakiyev
- Preceded by: Kubanychbay Tinaliev
- Succeeded by: Zamir Moldoshev

Personal details
- Born: 20 November 1952 Orto Alysh, Frunze Region, Kirghiz SSR, Soviet Union
- Died: 2 April 2026 (aged 73)
- Education: Alma-Ata Higher Combined Arms Command School; Vystrel course; Military Academy of the General Staff of the Armed Forces of Russia
- Occupation: Military officer

Mels Sagynalievich Bekboev (Kyrgyz: Мэлс Сагыналиевич Бекбоев; 20 November 1952 – 2 April 2026) was a Kyrgyz military officer and politician. He served as chief of the General Staff of Armed Forces from 2004 to 2006.

Bekboev died on 2 April 2026, at the age of 73.
