= Janybek Kaparov =

Former Chief of the General Staff of the Armed Forces of Kyrgyzstan

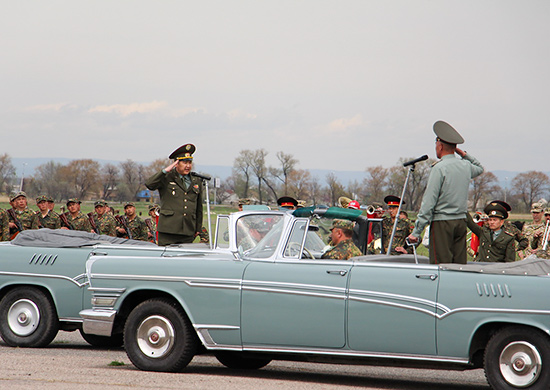
Kaparov (left) during a general rehearsal for a military parade in Bishkek in 2015.

Colonel Janybek Akmatovich Kaparov (Kyrgyz: Жаныбек Акматович Капаров, born 8 May 1970 in Ala-Buka, Jalal-Abad Region, Kirghiz Soviet Socialist Republic) is a Kyrgyzstani officer and a former Chief of the General Staff of the Armed Forces of Kyrgyzstan (2015–2016).

== Career ==
In 1992 he graduated from the Tashkent Higher Combined-Arms Command School, and In 2001, he graduated with honors, from the Combined Arms Academy of the Russian Armed Forces. He served in the task force from the Collective Security Treaty Organization that patrolled the Tajik-Afghan border during the Tajikistani Civil War. His first major appointment came in 2012, with his appointment as Commander of the South-Western Regional Command. In 2014, Kaparov served as Deputy Chief of the General Staff of the Armed Forces of Kyrgyzstan and the chief of the Bishkek Military Garrison. On 5 November 2015 he was appointed Chief of the General Staff of the Armed Forces, succeeding Asanbek Alymkozhoev. On 11 May 2016, Kaparov was discharged from this post by order of president Almazbek Atambayev after 6 months on the job.
