= Abibilla Kudayberdiev =

Kyrgyz politician

- Абибилла Кудайбердиев
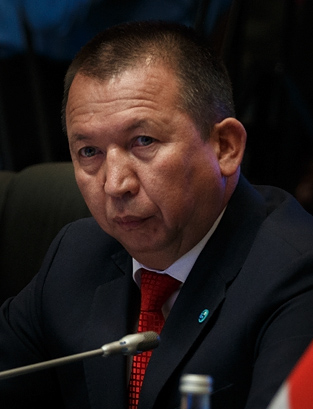
- Kudayberdiev in 2015

6th Minister of Defense
- In office 20 July 2010 – 26 December 2011
- President: Roza Otunbayeva
- Preceded by: Ismail Isakov
- Succeeded by: Taalaibek Omuraliev
- In office April 4, 2014 – October 12, 2015
- President: Almazbek Atambayev
- Preceded by: Taalaibek Omuraliev
- Succeeded by: Mirbek Kasimkulov (as Chairmen of the State Committee for Defense Affairs)

6th Chief of General Staff of Armed Forces of the Kyrgyz Republic
- In office November 2009 – July 2010
- President: Kurmanbek Bakiyev
- Preceded by: Boris Yugai
- Succeeded by: Taalaibek Omuraliev

Personal details
- Born: June 1, 1962 (age 64) Osh Oblast, Kyrgyz SSR, Soviet Union
- Children: 3

Military service
- Allegiance: USSR; Kyrgyzstan
- Branch/service: Kyrgyz Army
- Years of service: 1983 – present
- Rank: Major General

Abibilla Kudayberdiev (Kyrgyz and Russian: Абибилла Кудайбердиев born June 1, 1962) is the former Minister of Defense of Kyrgyzstan.

== Biography ==
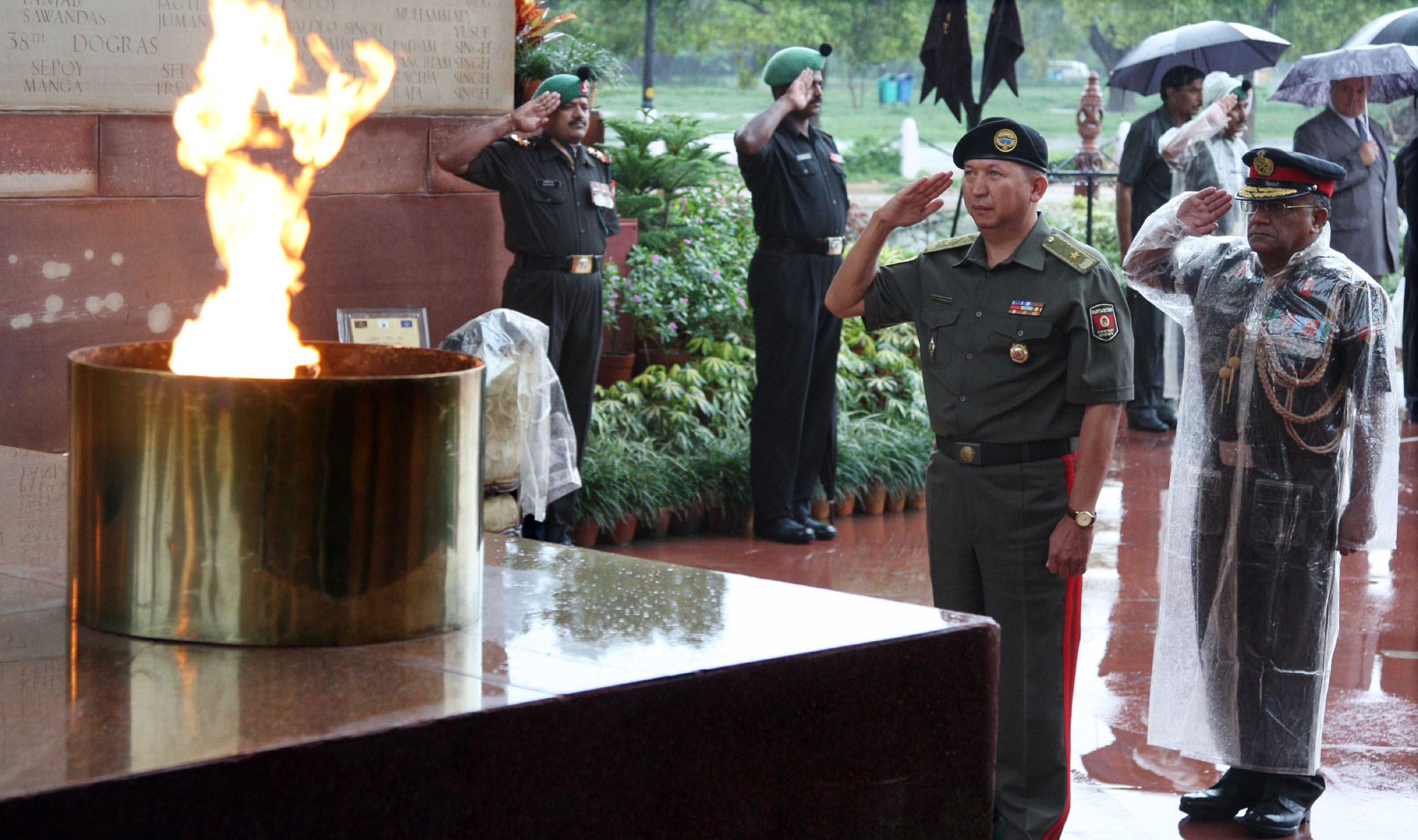
Kudayberdiev rendering a hand salute at Amar Jawan Jyoti in New Delhi, 9 September 2011.

He was born on June 1, 1962, in the Nookat District, in the city of Osh. In 1983, he graduated from the Alma-Ata Higher All-Arms Command School in the Kazakh SSR. In 2003, he graduated from the Combined Arms Academy of the Armed Forces of the Russian Federation. From 2008 to 2009, he served as the head of the Bishkek Higher Military School. In November 2009, he was appointed the Chief of the General Staff of Armed Forces, serving in this capacity for 7 months. In July 2010 he served as Minister of Defense of the Kyrgyz Republic. On April 4, 2014, by the Decree of the President of the Kyrgyzstan, Kudayberdiev was re-appointed Minister of Defense of Kyrgyzstan. He was relieved of his post as Minister of Defense on October 12, 2015, by President Atambayev.

== Education ==
- 1983 - Alma-Ata Higher All-Arms Command School
- 2003 - Combined Arms Academy of the Armed Forces of the Russian Federation

== Awards ==
- Order of Manas
- Erdik medal
