= General Staff of Armed Forces (Kyrgyzstan) =

Military staff of Kyrgyzstan

The General Staff of the Armed Forces of Kyrgyz Republic (Kyrgyz: Кыргыз Республикасынын Куралдуу Күчтөрүнүн Башкы штабы, romanized: Kyrgyz Respublikasynyn Kuralduu Küçtörünün Bashky shtaby) is the military staff of the Armed Forces of the Kyrgyz Republic.

The Chief of the General Staff is appointed by the President of Kyrgyzstan, who is the supreme commander-in-chief of the armed forces. From 2014-2021, the Chief of the General Staff was the paramount leader of the armed forces, just second to the commander in chief. It is currently composed of the commanders of the Kyrgyz Army, Kyrgyz Air Force, Kyrgyzstan Frontier Force, and the Kyrgyz National Guard. The headquarters of the General Staff is located on 26 Yakov Logvinenko Street, in Bishkek, Kyrgyzstan.

== General information ==
The Chief of the General Staff is appointed directly by the President of Kyrgyzstan, who is also commander in chief of the country's military. He/she holds the rank of Major general (Генерал майор). The general staff is the chief organizing and executive body in the armed force responsible for maintaining its combat readiness. From 2014-2021, it was higher in precedence to the State Committee for Defense Affairs, which was the equivalent to Kyrgyzstan's defense ministry. In February 2014, the General Staff was expanded to have complete control and authority over the entire military, with the state defense committee playing a smaller, sometimes ceremonial role. This was reverted in February 2021, with the General Staff presently serving as an administrative position under the Ministry of Defense.

== Members of the General Staff ==
Rank	Name	Position
Colonel	Kumarbek Kalmataev	Acting Chief of the General Staff of the Armed Forces - First Deputy Minister of Defense
Major General	Erlis Terdikbayev	First Deputy Minister of Defense
	Temirbek Kozuev	Head of the Department of Legal Support and Anti-Corruption
Lieutenant Colonel	Ulanbek Osmonaliev	Head of the Main Organizational and Mobilization Directorate - Deputy Chief of the General Staff
Colonel	Kanatbek Shamyrov	Head of the Conscription Department of the Main Organizational and Mobilization Department
Colonel	Ruslan Sharshembiev	Head of the Military Institute of the Armed Forces of the Kyrgyz Republic

== List of chiefs ==
Chief of the General Staff
- Башкы штабдын башчысы (Kyrgyz)
- Incumbent; Tariel Otonbaev since 11 October 2025
- Armed Forces of the Kyrgyz Republic
- Member of: General Staff of Armed Forces
- Appointer: President
- Formation: 1992
- First holder: Myrzakan Subanov
- Website: Official website

No.	Portrait	Name (lifespan)	Term of office			Ref.
No.	Portrait	Name (lifespan)	Took office	Left office	Time in office	Ref.
1	Myrzakan Subanov	Myrzakan Subanov (born 1944)	1992	1993	0–1 years	
2	Ismail Isakov	Major General; Ismail Isakov (born 1950)	1994	1995	0–1 years	
3	Esen Topoev	Major General; Esen Topoev (born 1952)	1995	October 1999	3–4 years	
4	Nurdin Chomoev	Major General; Nurdin Chomoev (born 1949)	October 1999	2001	1–2 years	
5	Alik Mamyrkulov	Colonel; Alik Mamyrkulov (born 1956)	26 October 2002	September 2003	10 months	
6	Kubanychbay Tinaliev	Major General; Kubanychbay Tinaliev (born 1956)	2003	2004	0–1 years	
7	Mels Bekboev	Major General; Mels Bekboev (1952–2026)	August 2004	January 2006	1 year, 5 months	
8	Zamir Moldoshev	Major General; Zamir Moldoshev (1953–2022)	January 2006	14 March 2007	1 year, 2 months	
9	Boris Yugai	Major General; Boris Yugai (1957–2010)	14 March 2007	24 June 2008	1 year, 3 months	
10	Askarbek Japarov	Colonel; Askarbek Japarov (born 1966)	24 June 2008	October 2009	1 year, 3 months	
11	Abibilla Kudayberdiev	Major General; Abibilla Kudayberdiev (born 1962)	November 2009	July 2010	8 months	.
12	Taalaibek Omuraliev	Major General; Taalaibek Omuraliev (born 1965)	July 2010	26 December 2011	1 year, 5 months	.
–	Janybek Kaparov	Colonel; Janybek Kaparov (born 1970); Acting	26 December 2011	18 January 2012	23 days	
13	Ilyazbek Subankulov	Major General; Ilyazbek Subankulov (born 1968)	18 January 2012	6 February 2014	2 years, 19 days	
14	Asanbek Alymkozhoev	Major General; Asanbek Alymkozhoev (born 1956)	6 February 2014	5 November 2015	1 year, 272 days	
15	Janybek Kaparov	Major General; Janybek Kaparov (born 1970)	5 November 2015	11 May 2016	188 days	
16	Rayimberdi Duishenbiev	Major General; Rayimberdi Duishenbiev (born 1972)	11 May 2016	9 October 2020	4 years, 151 days	
(11)	Taalaibek Omuraliev	Major General; Taalaibek Omuraliev (born 1965)	9 October 2020	29 March 2021	171 days	
17	Erlis Terdikbayev	Major General; Erlis Terdikbayev (born 1969)	29 March 2021	2 October 2023	2 years, 187 days	
18	Ruslan Mukambetov	Major General; Ruslan Mukambetov (born 1971)	2 October 2023	15 May 2025	1 year, 226 days	
–	Kumarbek Kalmataev	Colonel; Kumarbek Kalmataev; Acting	15 May 2025	11 October 2025	149 days	.
19	Tariel Otonbaev	Major General; Tariel Otonbaev (born 1972)	11 October 2025	Incumbent	1 year, 26 days	

== Awards of the General Staff ==
Military personnel of the Armed Forces can be awarded General Staff awards, as well as military personnel of foreign states and citizens of the Kyrgyz Republic. Currently, the General Staff of the Armed Forces of the Kyrgyz Republic has the following departmental awards:

- Medal "For military merits"
- Medal "For loyalty to duty"

== See also ==
- Chief of the General Staff
- Band of the General Staff of the Armed Forces of Kyrgyzstan
