= Ruslan Mukambetov =

- Руслан Мукамбетов

Minister of Defense
- Incumbent
- Assumed office 22 May 2025
- President: Sadyr Japarov
- Preceded by: Baktybek Bekbolotov

Personal details
- Born: March 3, 1971 (age 55) Frunze, Kirghiz SSR, Soviet Union (now Bishkek, Kyrgyzstan)

Military service
- Allegiance: Kyrgyzstan
- Branch/service: Armed Forces of the Republic of Kyrgyzstan
- Years of service: 1992-Present
- Rank: Major General

Ruslan Mustafaevich Mukambetov (Kyrgyz: Руслан Мустафаевич Мукамбетов) is a Kyrgyz general who was the Secretary of the Security Council of Kyrgyzstan since May 22, 2025.

== Biography ==
He was born on 3 March 1971 in Frunze, the capital of the Kirghiz SSR (now Bishkek, Kyrgyzstan). In 1992, he graduated from the Tashkent Higher All-Arms Command School in Tashkent, Uzbekistan.

From 2008-2010, he completed a full course of study at the Combined Arms Academy of the Russian Ground Forces. In 2008, he graduated from the Military Academy of the General Staff of the Armed Forces of the Russian Federation. From March 29, 2021, he was Commander of the Southwestern Operational Command. He was promoted to Major General on Defender of the Fatherland Day in 2022.

On 3 October 2023, he was made Chief of the General Staff of the Armed Forces and First Deputy Minister of Defense. He was removed from this post on 14 April 2025. On 15 May, he was appointed by President Sadyr Japarov as acting Minister of Defense. He replaced Baktybek Bekbolotov, who took over as Secretary of the Security Council. His candidacy was unanimously approved by the Jogorku Kenesh on 22 May.
