= Security Council of Kyrgyzstan =

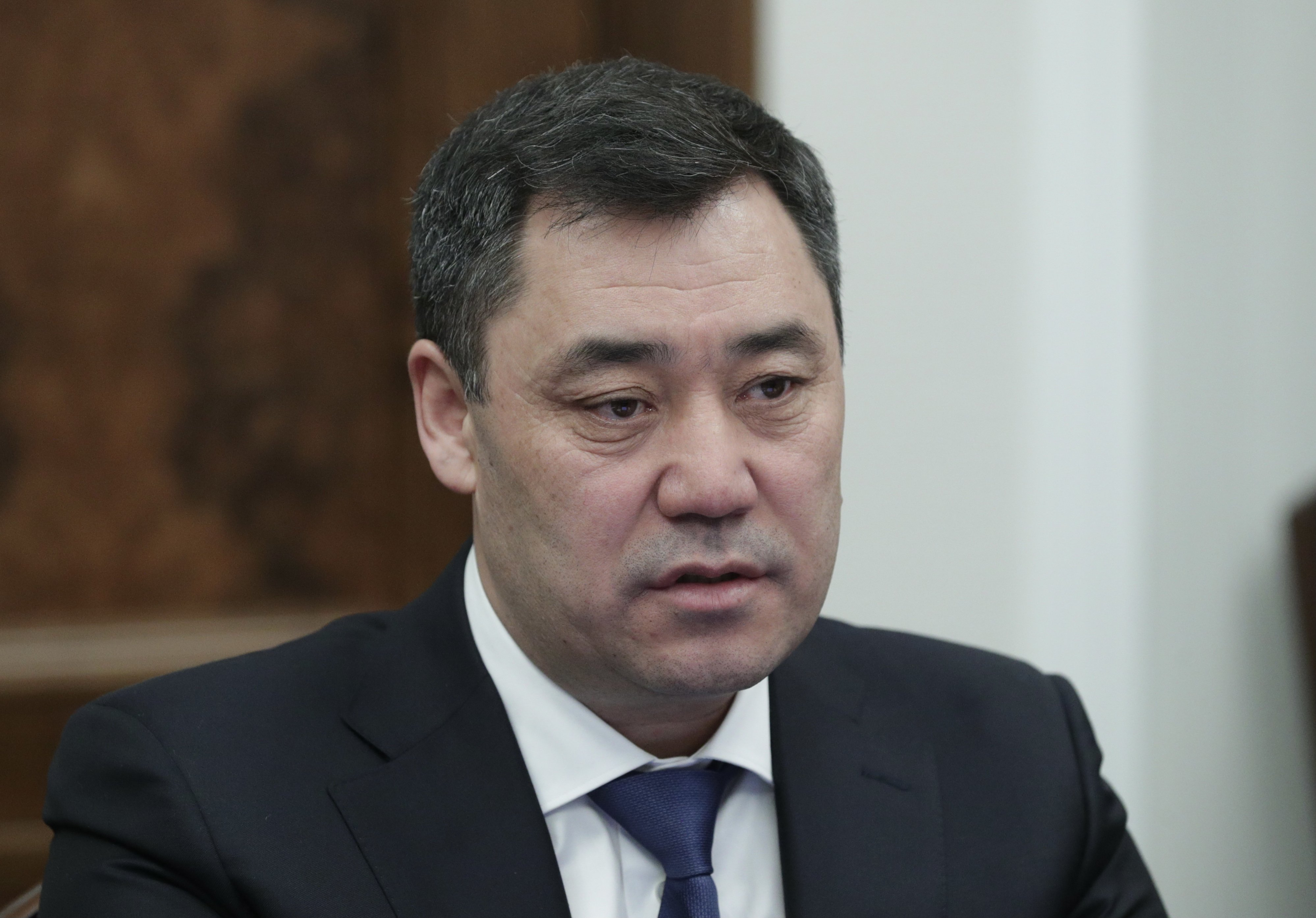
Sadyr Japarov in February 2021. As president, he serves as the council's chairman.

The Security Council of Kyrgyzstan (Kyrgyz: Кыргызстандын Коопсуздук Кенешинин, Russian: Совет Безопасности Кыргызстана) is a political/constitutional body in the Office of the President of the Kyrgyz Republic. Its tasks are to consider internal and external threats to Kyrgyzstan and maintaining its security and defense. Being a purely advisory body, it aides the President in developing his/her decisions related to the Armed Forces of Kyrgyzstan and other law enforcement bodies. The Secretary is the head of the council, being a member of the Administration of the President. The current Secretary of the Security Council is Marat Imankulov.

== History ==
Misir Ashirkulov served as Department of Defense and Security of the Administration of the President, the predecessor of the council. The security council was renamed in 2010 to the defense council and was reverted to its former name in March 2017.

== Composition of members ==
The when the council is convened (usually twice a year), it is composed of the following members:

- President of Kyrgyzstan (Chairman)
- Secretary of the Security Council
- Chairman of the Cabinet of Ministers
- Head of the Presidential Administration
- Speaker of the Jogorku Kenesh
- Chief of the General Staff
- Minister of Defense
- Minister of Foreign Affairs
- Minister of Internal Affairs
- Minister of Emergency Situations
- Prosecutor General
- Chairman of the State Committee for National Security
- Head of the State Border Guard Service

== List of secretaries ==
- Bolot Dzhanuzakov (September 1999 - March 7, 2001)
- Misir Ashirkulov (March 7, 2001- May 24, 2004)
- Miroslav Niyazov (2005 – 2006)
- Tokon Mamytov (2007 – 2008)
- Adakhan Madumarov (5 October 2008 — 26 October 2009)
- Alik Orozov (2009 – 23 August 2010)
- Marat Imankulov (23 August 2010 – January 2011)
- Busurmankul Tabaldiev (December 7, 2011 - August 15, 2013)
- Zhenish Razakov (28 August 2017 – 26 October 2017)
- Almazbek Kurmanaliev (26 October 2017 – 18 December 2017)
- Damir Sagynbayev (12 March 2018 – 10 October 2020)
- Keneshbek Duishebaev (15 October 2020 – 27 October 2020)
- Ryskeldi Musaev (27 October 2020 – 8 May 2021)
- Marat Imankulov (8 May 2021 – 15 May 2025)
- Baktybek Bekbolotov (15 May 2025 – 1 December 2025)
- Marat Imankulov (1 December 2025 – present)

== See also ==
- National Security Council under the President of Uzbekistan
- State Security Council of Turkmenistan
- Security Council of Tajikistan
- Security Council of Kazakhstan
