= Batken conflict =

1999 military conflict between Kyrgyzstan and the Islamic Movement of Uzbekistan

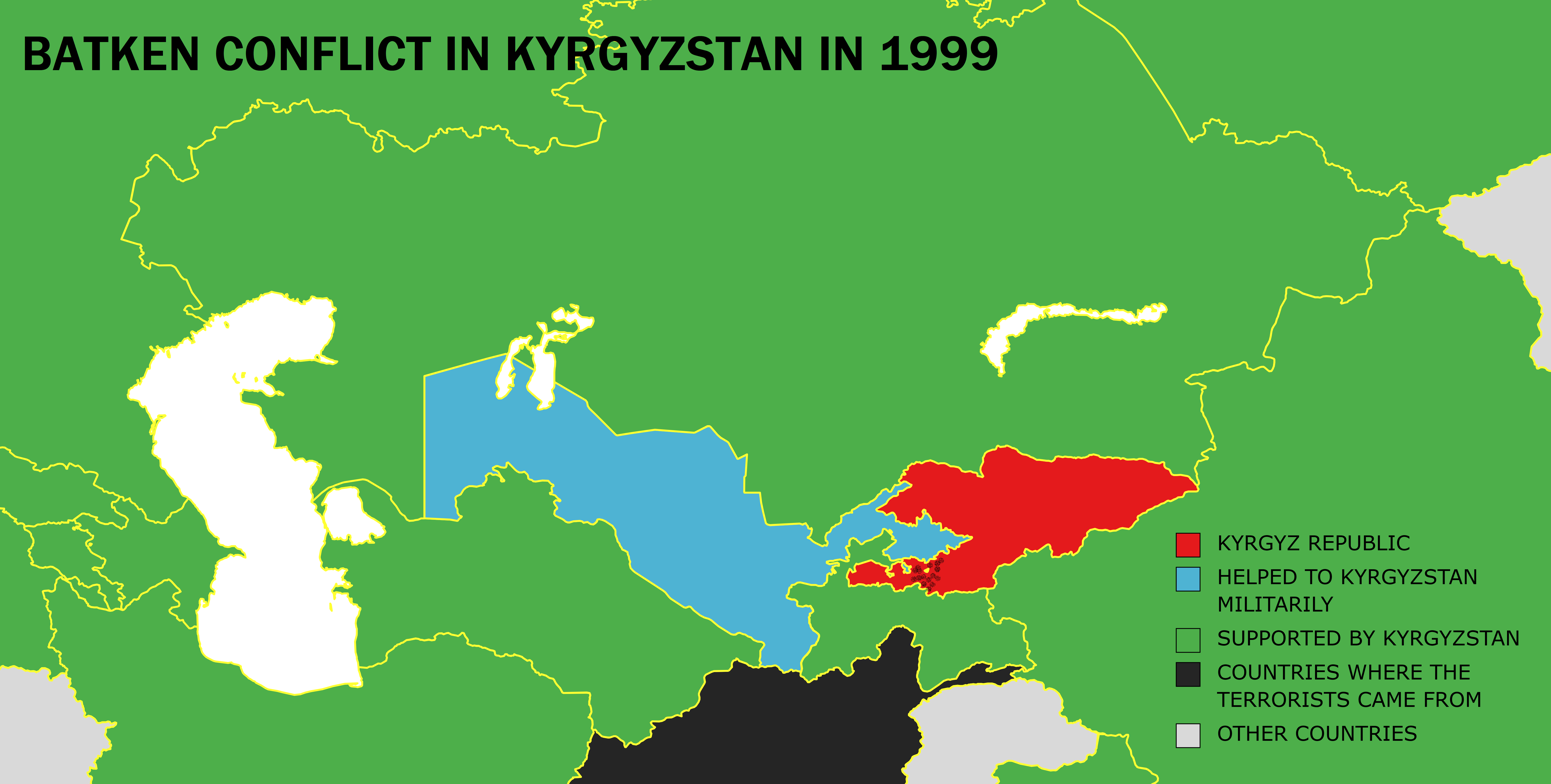
Date	July 30 – September 27, 1999 (1 month and 4 weeks)
Location	Batken Region, Kyrgyzstan
Result	Strategic Kyrgyz victory; The IMU is pushed back into Tajikistan

Belligerents
Kyrgyzstan; Russia (material support); Uzbekistan (military support)	Islamic Movement of Uzbekistan

Commanders and leaders
(Kyrgyzstan) Askar Akayev (Kyrgyzstan) Myrzakan Subanov (Kyrgyzstan) Esen Topoev (Kyrgyzstan) Abdrakhman Mamataliev (Kyrgyzstan) Abdygul Chotbaev (Kyrgyzstan) Colonel Stanislav Kholodkov	Juma Namangani; Tohir Yoʻldosh

Strength
5,800-7,000 militiamen and soldiers	More than 1,000 militants

Casualties and losses
32 civilians and soldiers killed	more than 1,150 militants were killed

The Batken conflict (Kyrgyz: Баткен окуясы, romanized: Batken okuyasy, Russian: Баткенские события) was a period of armed clashes between militants of the Islamic Movement of Uzbekistan (IMU) and the Armed Forces of Kyrgyzstan, with support to the former being provided by the Uzbek Ground Forces. It was caused by incursions of IMU militants into Uzbek and Kyrgyz territory from Tajikistan and was in part, centered on the unilateral demarcation of the Kyrgyzstan–Uzbekistan border by Uzbekistan.

== Background ==
In February 1999, the Uzbek capital of Tashkent experienced a series of explosions in an attempt on President Islam Karimov's life, who then blamed it on radical Wahhabi Islamic Movement of Uzbekistan militants. According to the militants, their goal was to facilitate an overthrow of the Uzbek government and President Karimov, after which the establishment of a fully Islamic state in Uzbekistan would follow.

== Events ==
In the summer of that year, IMU guerrilla rebels invaded the Batken Region of Kyrgyzstan (a region with an ethnically Uzbek majority). It was the IMU's first verifiable operation since it was established just a year before. Specifically, the city of Barak, Kyrgyzstan was occupied by militant forces, with the surrounding area being controlled and blockaded by Uzbek forces. During the intrusion, the rebels took several people hostage, including a Japanese geologist, who was eventually returned after the Japanese government paid a ransom. The rebels demanded that Kyrgyzstan provide safe passage for them to cross into Uzbekistan. On the eighth day of the conflict, Mayor Abdrakhman Mamataliev of Osh along with 3 security officers were captured by militants in order to send a message to the Bishkek authorities. They were in captivity for over a week until they were released on 13 August as a result of extensive negotiations and the extortion of a ransom, which included an Afghanistan-bound helicopter.

On 24 August, defense minister Myrzakan Subanov was dismissed from his post after Akayev and his government observed what his spokesman called a failure to "stabilize the situation." Just four days later, Akayev appointed Major General Esen Topoev, a native of the Batken, as minister of defense. On 1 September, Russian Prime Minister Vladimir Putin and Kyrgyz Deputy Prime Minister Boris Silaev met to discuss Russia formally providing technical assistance to the Kyrgyz Army in eliminating the militants. The government spent the next month concentrating their operations on the IMU militants throughout the mountains, utilizing air strikes and artillery shelling to help aide their advance. By 25 September, the Batken region was completely stripped of militants, with some retreating to Tajikistan. The government then arrested over 70 civilians in Bishkek who were suspected of having links with the IMU terrorists. The Kyrgyz and Uzbek governments agreed to confine the rebels in the mountains during the winter, in an attempt to ensure the disablement of the invading forces.

== Aftermath ==
Following the conclusion of the conflict, the Uzbek government began the process of sealing its border with Kyrgyzstan, enacting measures such as constructing a barbed wire fence and creating a 2-meter (6.67-foot) fence throughout 1999 and 2000. The Uzbek government also hinted at a military intervention in the country, with defense minister Hikmatulla Tursunov declaring that the Uzbek Armed Forces stand ready to launch attacks on rebel sanctuaries in both "nearby" and "other places". The conflict was a key factor in political debates between the government of Amangeldy Muraliyev and opposition, eventually incorporating itself into that year's parliamentary and presidential elections. The Batken Region was created as a response to IMU activities. Kyrgyzstan accused Uzbekistan of using the conflict to seize large areas of agricultural land that was loaned to Uzbekistan during the Soviet period for temporary usage.

The conflict also had a major impact on the international community, who collectively put pressure on Tajikistan to expel the IMU from the country, specifically the Tavildara Valley where it is based. The IMU eventually abandoned the valley in late 1999 after persuasion from the Islamic Renaissance Party of Tajikistan (IRPT).

== See also ==
- Post-Soviet conflicts
