= Myrzakan Subanov =

Soviet-Kyrgyz military commander

- Born: 15 October 1944; Talas District, Kirghiz SSR, Soviet Union (now Kyrgyzstan)
- Military career
- Allegiance: USSR; Kyrgyzstan
- Branch: Soviet Army; Kyrgyz Army; State Border Guard Service
- Rank: Colonel-general
- Conflicts: Soviet–Afghan War (as Soviet adviser, 1987–1989)
- Awards: Order of the Red Star and other awards
- Other work: Deputy Chairman of the State Defense Committee of the Republic of Kyrgyzstan, 1992–1993 Chairman of the State Defense Committee of the Republic of Kyrgyzstan, Minister of Defense of the Kyrgyz Republic, 1993–1999 Director of the Executive Council of the Shanghai Cooperation Organisation Regional Counterterrorism Structure

Myrzakan Usurkanovich Subanov (Kyrgyz: Мырзакан Усурканович (Усуркан уулу) Субанов, romanized: Myrzaqan Usurqanovich (Usurqan uulu) Subanov; born 15 October 1944) is a Soviet-Kyrgyz military commander who served as post-Soviet Kyrgyzstan's chairman of the State Defense Committee in 1992–1993 and first Minister of Defense in 1993–1999.

== Biography ==
Myrzakan Subanov was born in the Talas District of the Kyrgyz Soviet Socialist Republic in 1944. He graduated from the Tashkent Higher All-Arms Command School in 1966, the Frunze Military Academy in 1977, and the General Staff Academy in 1984.

A major-general in the Soviet Army, he served as a military adviser to the Afghan Army during the civil war against the mujihadeen from 1987 to 1989. and led an army corps in the Leningrad Military District from 1989, and was named a deputy commander of the Turkestan Military District in 1991.

Subanov returned to Kyrgyzstan following the dissolution of the Soviet Union to serve in the military of Kyrgyzstan and was appointed State Defense Committee Chairman Major-General Dzhanybek Umetaliyev's first deputy in 1992.

Myrzakan Sabanov succeeded Umetaliyev as head of the Defense Committee on 22 July 1993, becoming Kyrgyzstan's first Minister of Defense when the Defense Ministry was formed by the Akayev government as a replacement for the State Defense Committee in the same year.

Subanov was promoted to lieutenant-general and colonel-general during his tenure as defense minister, but was dismissed from the Defense Ministry after an August 1999 incident in which guerrillas from Tajikistan crossed into Kyrgyzstan, occupied border villages, and seized hostages. Akayev's government dismissed Colonel-General Subanov over what press spokesman Kanybek Imanaliyev described as a failure to "stabilize the situation."

Subanov was returned to a prominent position in the government following the Tulip Revolution that ended President Akayev's fifteenth year in power in 2005 and served as head of the national Border Service in 2005 – 2006.

He was elected director of the Executive Committee of the Shanghai Cooperation Organisation's Regional Counterterrorism Structure in 2006.
