= Ministry of Defense (Kyrgyzstan) =

Government ministry of Kyrgyzstan

Ministry of Defence
- Кыргыз Республикасынын Коргоо министрлиги Министерство обороны Кыргызской Республики
- Emblem of the Ministry of Defense

Agency overview
- Formed: 13 January 1992
- Jurisdiction: Government of Kyrgyzstan
- Headquarters: Kiev-Logvinenko Street, Bishkek, Kyrgyzstan
- Employees: 11,000
- Minister responsible: Major General Ruslan Mukambetov, Minister of Defense
- Deputy Ministers responsible: Vacant, First Deputy Minister and Chief of the General Staff; Erlis Terdikbayev, First Deputy Minister
- Website: https://mil.gov.kg

The Ministry of Defense of the Kyrgyz Republic (Kyrgyz: Кыргыз Республикасынын Коргоо министрлиги, romanized: Kyrgyz Respublikasynyn Korgoo ministrligi, Russian: Министерство обороны Кыргызской Республики), formerly known as the State Committee for Defense Affairs (Kyrgyz: Кыргыз Республикасынын Коргоо иштери боюнча мамлекеттик комитети, КР КИБМК, romanized: Kyrgyz Respublikasynyn Korgoo ishteri boyuncha mamlekettik komiteti, KR KIBMK, Russian: Государственный комитет по делам обороны Кыргызской Республики, ГКДO КР), is the main executive body responsible for the Armed Forces of Kyrgyzstan, having the authority to is responsible for the readiness of the military command and the control bodies in its ranks. In accordance with legislation connected to the armed forces. The current Minister of Defense is Major General Ruslan Mukambetov.

== History ==
The Ministry was formed from the headquarters of the 17th Army Corps, after the dissolution of the Soviet Union in 1991-92. Originally, it was named the State Defense Committee, by order of President Askar Akayev on January 13, 1992. In 1993, the State Defense Committee was renamed to the Ministry of Defense of the Kyrgyz Republic. In November 2015, the Ministry of Defense was renamed the State Committee for Defense Affairs. In 2018, the Jogorku Kenesh raised the issue of restoring the Ministry of Defense, with Deputy Almambet Shykmamatov saying that Generals of the General Staff are not recognized abroad, since in other countries this body is "just an office" that coordinates the work of different agencies. Following the inauguration of President Sadyr Japarov in early February 2021, the Ministry of Defense was reestablished. This came after a poll appeared on the General Staff's Facebook page asking whether citizens consider it necessary to re-create the ministry, with the majority supporting the idea.

== Regular Duties ==
The committee is at present, responsible for organizing the Armed Forces of Kyrgyzstan, which is done through the following actions:

- Reporting to the President and Government of Kyrgyzstan on the status of the armed forces
- Carrying out public military policy implemented by the government
- Management, oversight, and execution of military activities
- Administration of all institutions related to the military through the Chief of the General Staff
- Equipping the different service branches of the armed forces with the latest in military technology

In February 2014, the powers of the General Staff was expanded to give the Chief of General Staff the authority to have complete control over the armed forces. The Ministry of Defense's functions, on the other hand, were largely reduced, leaving its comprehensive support of the military as its mandate. In a 2015 military reform, the two departments became completely independent, with the chairman of the State Committee on Defense Affairs effectively being subordinated to the Chief of General Staff.

== Leadership structure ==
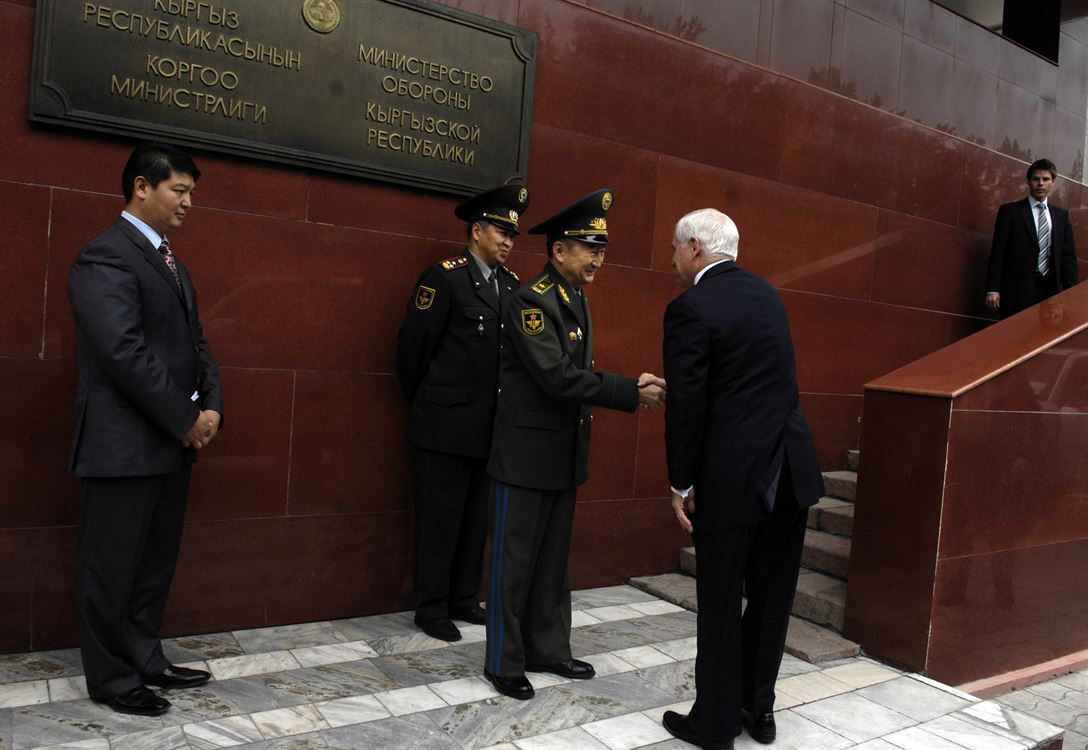
The Deputy Minister of Defense greets Secretary of Defense Robert Gates at the defense ministry on June 5, 2007.

- Minister of Defense – Major General Ruslan Mukambetov
- First Deputy Minister of Defense – Erlis Terdikbayev
- Chief of the General Staff – Vacant
- Deputy Minister of Defense – Colonel Almazbek Karasartov
- Deputy Minister of Defense – Colonel Akylbek Ibraev
- Commander of the South-West Operational Command – Colonel Ruslan Mukambetov

== List of leaders ==
No.	Portrait	Name (Born-Died)	Term		
No.	Portrait	Name (Born-Died)	Took office	Left office	Duration
Minister of Defense
1	Dzhanybek Umetaliev	Major General; Dzhanybek Umetaliev	13 January 1992	17 December 1993	1 year, 338 days
2	Myrzakan Subanov	Major General; Myrzakan Subanov (born 1944)	17 December 1993	29 August 1999	5 years, 255 days
3	Esen Topoev	Major General; Esen Topoev (born 1952)	29 August 1999	24 March 2005	5 years, 207 days
–	Ismail Isakov	Lieutenant General; Ismail Isakov (born 1950); Acting	24 March 2005	September 2005	5 months
4	Ismail Isakov	Lieutenant General; Ismail Isakov (born 1950)	September 2005	26 May 2008	2 years, 8 months
5	Bakytbek Kalyev	Major General; Bakytbek Kalyev	26 May 2008	7 April 2010	1 year, 316 days
–	Ismail Isakov	Lieutenant General; Ismail Isakov (born 1950); Acting	7 April 2010	20 July 2010	104 days
6	Abibilla Kudayberdiev	Major General; Abibilla Kudayberdiev (born 1962)	20 July 2010	26 December 2011	1 year, 159 days
7	Taalaibek Omuraliev	Major General; Taalaibek Omuraliev (born 1965)	26 December 2011	4 April 2014	2 years, 99 days
(6)	Abibilla Kudayberdiev	Major General; Abibilla Kudayberdiev (born 1962)	4 April 2014	12 October 2015	1 year, 191 days
Chairmen of the State Committee for Defense Affairs (Председатель Комитета по делам обороны Киргизской Республики)
8	Mirbek Kasimkulov	Colonel; Mirbek Kasimkulov	14 March 2017	21 April 2018	1 year, 38 days
9	Erlis Terdikbayev	Colonel; Erlis Terdikbayev (born 1969)	21 April 2018	3 February 2021	2 years, 288 days
Minister of Defense
7	Taalaibek Omuraliev	Major General; Taalaibek Omuraliev (born 1965)	3 February 2021	6 September 2021	215 days
8	Baktybek Bekbolotov	Lieutenant General; Baktybek Bekbolotov (born 1964)	6 September 2021	Incumbent	4 years, 336 days

== See also ==
- Armed Forces of the Republic of Kyrgyzstan
- Politics of Kyrgyzstan
