= Kyrgyz Army =

Kyrgyz Ground Forces
- Кыргызстандын Кургактагы Аскерлер
- Uniform sleeve patch of the Kyrgyz Armed Forces
- Founded: 1992 (Historical); 25 January 2017
- Country: Kyrgyzstan
- Type: Army
- Part of: Armed Forces of the Kyrgyz Republic
- Headquarters: Bishkek
- Colors: Red and Yellow
- March: "Kyz kuumai" («Кыз куумай»)

Commanders
- Commander-in-chief: Sadyr Japarov
- Commander of the Army: Colonel Almazbek Karasartov

Insignia
- Military Ensign (Kyrgyz, obverse)

- Military Ensign (Russian, reverse)

The Kyrgyz Ground Forces, or simply the Kyrgyz Army, is the land force branch of the Armed Forces of the Republic of Kyrgyzstan.

== History ==
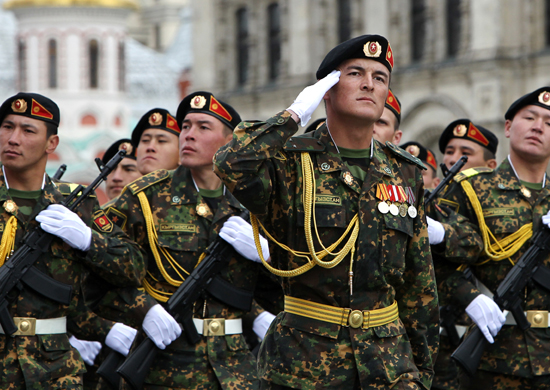
The parade contingent from the Panfilov Division during the 2010 Moscow Victory Day Parade on Red Square in 2010.

In April 1992, Kyrgyzstan formed a State Committee for Defense Affairs, and in June the republic took control of all troops on its soil (meaning remaining units of the stationed in Kyrgyzstan) after Moscow stated that they would not back financing a unified CIS military. A general staff was created in 1993. In 1994, 30 percent of the officer corps were ethnic Russians.

The first commander was General Valentin Luk'yanov, an ethnic Ukrainian. In Russian sources Luk'yanov is listed as the commander of the 8th Guards Motor Rifle Division from 1985-91.

On January 25, 2017, President Almazbek Atambayev officially founded the Kyrgyz Army, with Colonel Erlis Terdikbayev acting as its first commander.

== Structure ==
Ground forces are divided into 2 military commands, the Northern and Southern Groups of Forces.

=== Northern Group of Forces ===
- 8th Guards Motor Rifle Panfilov Division (Tokmok)
- 2nd Guards Motor Rifle Frunze Brigade (Koy-Tash)
- Independent Tank Regiment
- Machine Gun Battalions (Karakol)
- Artillery Battalions (Naryn)
- Engineering Battalion
- Signals Battalion
- Scorpion 25th Special Forces Brigade (Tokmok)
- Artillery Brigade
- Balykchynsky Brigade
- Specialized units

=== Southern Group of Forces ===
- 68th Independent Mountain Rifle Brigade (Osh)
- Armored Battalion (Ala-Buka District)
- Machine Gun and Artillery Battalion
- Mountain Rifle Battalion "Batken"
- 24th Independent "Ilbirs" (Snow Leopard) Special Purpose Brigade (Kök-Janggak)
- Reconnaissance Battalion
- anti-aircraft artillery regiment
- parts and subdivisions of support, chemical protection, etc.

== Equipment ==
Small arms

Name	Origin	Caliber	Image	Notes
Pistols
Makarov	USSR	9×18mm Makarov		
PSM	USSR	5.45×18mm		
Stechkin	USSR	9×18mm Makarov		
Rifles and carbines
SKS	USSR	7.62×39mm		Ceremonial usage
AKS-74U	USSR	5.45×39mm		Standard carbine
Assault rifles
AK-47	USSR	7.62×39mm		
AKM	USSR	7.62×39mm		
AK-74	USSR	5.45×39mm		
AN-94	Russian Federation	5.45×39mm		60 donated by Russia in 2012
QBZ-95	China	5.8×42mm DBP87		
M4 Carbine	United States	5.56x45mm NATO		
Sniper and designated marksman rifles
OSV-96	Russia	12.7×108mm		
SVD Dragunov	USSR	7.62×54mmR		
MKEK JNG-90	Turkey	7.62×51mm		
Machine guns
RPK	USSR	7.62×39mm		
RPK-74	USSR	5.45×39mm		
PK machine gun	USSR	7.62×54mmR		
NSV	USSR	12.7×108mm		
Rocket Launchers
RPG-7	USSR			
HAR-66	Turkey			

=== Armor ===
Name	Origin	Type	In service	Notes
Tanks
T-72	Soviet Union	Main battle tank	215	At least one lost in the 2022 Kyrgyzstan-Tajikistan clashes.
Armoured reconnaissance vehicle
BRDM-2	USSR	Reconnaissance vehicle	30	
BRDM-2MS	USSR	Reconnaissance vehicle	9	
Infantry fighting vehicles
BMP-1	USSR	Infantry fighting vehicle	230	All modernized.
BMP-2	USSR	Infantry fighting vehicle	90	All modernized.
Armoured personnel carrier
BTR-80	Soviet Union	Amphibious armoured personnel carrier	10	
BTR-70	Soviet Union	Amphibious armoured personnel carrier	45	BTR-70 & BTR-70M
Humvee	United States	Light armoured car	50	
Dongfeng EQ2050	China	Military light utility vehicle	Up to 65	Showed the 30th anniversary of the country's independence at the parade. At least one was lost in the 2022 Kyrgyzstan-Tajikistan clashes.
Tigr	Russia	Infantry mobility vehicle	Up to 100	55 vehicles purchased recently, and 50 vehicles donated from Russia in 2018. Others all purchased during previous years.
Toyota	Japan	Infantry mobility vehicle	40	Announced on 23 October 2021.
Towed artillery
D-30	Soviet Union	122mm howitzer	72	35 are the M-30 standard.
M-30(M-1938)	Soviet Union	122mm howitzer	35	
D-1	Soviet Union	152mm howitzer	16	
2A65 MSTA-B	Soviet Union	152mm howitzer	N/A	
BS-3	Soviet Union	100mm field gun	18	
T-12	Soviet Union	100mm Field gun	18	100mm round
Self-propelled artillery
2S1 Gvozdika	Soviet Union	122mm Self-propelled howitzer	18	
2S9 Nona	Soviet Union	120mm Self-propelled mortar	12	
Anti-tank weapons
9M14 Malyutka	Soviet Union	Anti-tank missile	26	
9M113 Konkurs	Soviet Union	Anti-tank missile	12	
9K111 Fagot	Soviet Union	Anti-tank weapon	24	
Anti aircraft guns and Air defense system
S-300	USSR / Russia	Long-range surface-to-air missile system	8	Russia and Kyrgyzstan signed an inter-governmental agreement on cooperation in military-technical field, by which Russia must ship $1 billion worth of modern weapons to the republic.
ZU-23-2	Soviet Union	Anti-aircraft autocannon	N/A	
9K35 Strela-10	Soviet Union	VM surface-to-air missile system	4	
9K32 Strela-2	Soviet Union	VM surface-to-air-missile system	N/A	
ZSU-23-4 Shilka	Soviet Union	Self-propelled anti aircraft gun	24	
Flying Leopard 6C	China	Short-range surface-to-air missile system	N/A	Leopard 6C short-range air defense system was seen during the exercises of the Kyrgyz army in the Bujum training field in Issyk-Kul region of Kyrgyzstan in September 2020. It's capable to shot down by 500–600 km.
AZP S-60	Soviet Union	Anti-aircraft gun	24	
Multiple rocket launchers
BM-21 Grad	Soviet Union	Multiple rocket launcher	15	
BM-27 Uragan	Soviet Union	Multiple rocket launcher	6	
Utility vehicles
Ford Ranger	United States	Pickup truck-attacking defender	45	Showed the 30th anniversary of the country's independence at the parade.
Polaris	United States	Quad	44	
Toyota Hilux	Japan	Pick up truck	45	
UAZ Hunter	USSR / Russia	Pick up truck	Up to 140	Supported by Russia as military gift which presented on 15 January 2019.
KamazAZ-43114	Russia	Pick up truck	N/A	Only small amount taken from Russia as a gift which 15 January 2019. Others all purchased from Russia and other post-soviet countries.
KamAZ-53215	Russia	Freight carrier	N/A	Only small amount taken from Russia as a gift which 15 January 2019. Others all purchased from Russia and other post-soviet countries.
KamAZ-5350KamAZ-4350	Russia	Freight carrier	N/A	Some of them is taken for free from Russia, others all purchased.
Shaanxi SX2190	China	Off-road vehicle	N/A	
