= 9th Guards Rifle Division =

9th Guards Rifle Division (November 26, 1941 – 1945)
- Active: 1941–1945
- Country: Soviet Union
- Branch: Red Army
- Type: Division
- Role: Infantry
- Engagements: World War II; Battle of Moscow; Battles of Rzhev; Rzhev-Vyasma Operation; Operation Blue; Battle for Velikiye Luki; Battle of Smolensk; Polotsk–Vitebsk Offensive; Operation Bagration; Polotsk Offensive; Baltic Offensive; Šiauliai Offensive; Riga Offensive; Memel Offensive Operation; Courland Pocket
- Decorations: Order of the Red Banner

Commanders
- Notable commanders: Maj. Gen. Afanasii Pavlantevich Beloborodov; Maj. Gen. Ignatii Vasilevich Prostyakov; Col. Porfirii Martynovich Gudz; Col. Valerii Ivanovich Savchuk; Col. Bauyrzhan Momyshuly

The 9th Guards Rifle Division was reformed as an elite infantry division of the Red Army in November, 1941, based on the 1st formation of the 78th Rifle Division and served in that role until after the end of the Great Patriotic War. It was first assigned to the 16th Army just before the start of the winter counteroffensive west of Moscow before being very briefly reassigned to the 33rd Army and then to the 43rd Army during the fighting around Rzhev. In May, 1942 it was awarded the Order of the Red Banner for its services, one of the first rifle divisions to be so recognized. After partially rebuilding it was railed south to Southwestern Front to help meet the German summer offensive. It gave very creditable service in the 38th Army as an infantry division facing armored divisions but suffered significant losses before it was returned to the Moscow Military District in September. In November it was assigned to Kalinin Front and played an important role in the liberation of Velikiye Luki during the winter, primarily in helping to block several attempts to relieve the besieged city. It remained in that Front (renamed 1st Baltic Front in October, 1943) for most of the rest of the war, for the most part in both the 5th and 2nd Guards Rifle Corps, before moving with the latter to 6th Guards Army, where it remained for the duration, fighting through the Baltic states during the summer and autumn offensives of 1944. In March, 1945 it joined the Courland Group of Forces of Leningrad Front on the Baltic coast containing the German forces encircled in northwest Latvia. Following the German surrender it was disbanded later in 1945.

== Formation ==
The division was officially raised to Guards status on November 26, 1941, although its sub-units would not be redesignated until February, 1942. Its order of battle, based on the last prewar (April 5, 1941) shtat (table of organization and equipment) for rifle divisions, was eventually as follows:

- 18th Guards Rifle Regiment (from 40th Rifle Regiment)
- 22nd Guards Rifle Regiment (from 258th Rifle Regiment)
- 31st Guards Rifle Regiment (from 131st Rifle Regiment)
- 28th Guards Artillery Regiment (from 159th Light Artillery Regiment)
- 210th Howitzer Artillery Regiment (until March 20, 1942)
- 2nd Guards Antitank Battalion
- 20th Guards Mortar Battalion (until August 6, 1942)
- 6th Guards Machine-gun Battalion (from October 27, 1942 to February 10, 1943)
- 12th Guards Reconnaissance Company
- 3rd Guards Sapper Battalion
- 4th Guards Signal Battalion
- 11th Guards Medical/Sanitation Battalion
- 5th Guards Chemical Defense (Anti-gas) Company
- 479th Motor Transport Company (later 70th Motor Transport Battalion plus 10th and 168th Motor Transport Companies)
- 1st Guards Field Bakery
- 14th Guards Divisional Veterinary Hospital
- 485th Field Postal Station
- 451st Field Office of the State Bank

Afanasii Pavlantevich Beloborodov, who had led the 78th Rifle Division since July 12 and was promoted to the rank of major general on the same day the division was redesignated as Guards, carried on in command. In his memoirs he recounted:

Even before dawn, the telephone was ringing, connecting the division with the Front headquarters. I heard the voice of [Front chief of staff] Lieutenant General V. D. Sokolovsky: "Istra has fallen?" "Fallen." "Not good. And you, a Guardsman!" I am silent. What Guardsman? Why? It was not like Vasily Danilovich to be so sarcastic... He then read from a document, "At the People's Commissariat of Defense. On the transformation of the Second and Third Cavalry Corps and the Seventy-eighth Rifle Division into Guards... Point three: the Seventy-eighth Rifle Division is transformed into the Ninth Guards Rifle Division." - He paused: - "And in brackets it reads: [division commander Major General Beloborodov Afanasii Pavlantevich] ... Congratulations to the division and you personally. Satisfied?" "That's not the word ... In the Far East, we all swore an oath with the whole division - to win the Guards rank ... Only ..." "Well, what is it?" “I'm a colonel, not a major general.” "You were a colonel. Until yesterday. The order was signed by the Supreme Commander ..." Political department workers led by Vavilov left for the unit. Directly at the front line, in the trenches, they had conversations with the personnel about this event, joyful for all of us. Now in all the regiments, battalions, artillery battalions and batteries, the soldiers and commanders proudly repeated: "We are the Guard, we are the Ninth Guards."

== Battle of Moscow ==
The 78th was assigned to 16th Army at the time it was redesignated and was holding Istra on November 25 as the only division of the Army still on the west bank of the Istra River, straddling the road to Volokolamsk. By the end of November 26 forces of the 10th Panzer Division had been able to cross the river in some areas. The now-9th Guards fought for the city overnight, both within it and along the eastern bank of the river south of town along a line up to 15 km (9.3 mi) in length. By 0400 hours on the next day it was forced to withdraw to Istra's eastern outskirts. On November 28 the division was forced to abandon the city entirely and fall back eastward to a line from Aleksino to Zhevnevo (6 km [3.7 mi] west of Dedovsk) where it consolidated. During this fighting it came under regular bombing attacks from groups of 6–8 German aircraft.

In his memoirs Marshal G. K. Zhukov, then commander of Western Front, recounts an incident from the fighting at this time. A phone call was received at his headquarters from Stalin, who asked if he was aware that Dedovsk had been captured. Zhukov replied in the negative at which point Stalin accused him of not knowing what was happening on his Front, ordering the retaking of the town and demanding that Zhukov leave his headquarters to take care of the matter personally. After calling Lt. Gen. K. K. Rokossovsky, commander of 16th Army, he learned that Stalin was mistaken and that the 9th Guards had probably lost part of the village of Dedovo. Zhukov tried to explain the misunderstanding but Stalin angrily insisted that he carry out his previous orders, while also taking the commander of the 5th Army to direct the artillery. Beloborodov was dismayed to see such senior officers but duly attacked at dawn on December 1 with a rifle company and two tanks to evict a German platoon from a handful of houses.

Over the following days the center and left flank forces of 16th Army, including the 9th Guards, were involved in heavy fighting in the area to the south of Solnechnogorsk and to the east of the Istra reservoir. The German panzer forces were seeking to break out of Kochergino and Yesipovo to the southeast. By the end of November 30 the division, along with the 8th and 7th Guards and 18th Rifle Divisions, was waging a fierce struggle along part of the line from Lyalovo to Alabushevo to Barantsevo to Zhevnevo. During December 2-3 the German forces managed to take Kryukovo after heavy street fighting but were unable to break through 16th Army's lines. The 9th Guards was engaged in heavy fighting with German infantry and tanks on the eastern outskirts of Nefedevo (3 km [1.9 mi] north of Dedovsk) with the 36th Rifle Brigade arriving in support. Although this place was briefly given up, on December 5 a counterattack by the division, backed by the 17th Tank and 40th Rifle Brigades, retook it, as well as Turovo, by noon and continued to advance on Petrovskoe as the German forces began to go over to the defense.

=== Winter Counteroffensive ===
On the evening of December 6 General Rokossovsky reported to the Western Front command that the Army would go over to the attack at 1000 hours the next day and described his objectives (in part):

5. The 18th Rifle and 9th Guards Rifle Divisions are to hold their present positions on December 7 and prepare for an offensive on December 8.

The German forces put up fierce resistance along the entire front. The division was involved in heavy fighting for Rozhdestveno which involved bayonet attacks. The German forces, having consolidated in the houses and employing small arms and mortar fire, defended fiercely and the division's attack was unsuccessful. Despite such local successes the German forces as a whole began to withdraw to the west. On December 9 Rokossovsky created two shock groups to operate against the flanks and rear of the German forces; the second consisted of the 9th Guards, 17th Tank and 36th and 40th Rifle Brigades plus the 89th Tank Battalion to retake Istra and then attack to the north. The attack began the next day and by December 11 the pace of the German retreat was accelerating; 16th Army reached a line from Kurilovo to Maksimovka to Istra, which was liberated by the 9th Guards that day. Over the next five days the Army fought for possession of the Istra reservoir, which had its dyke destroyed by the German forces. The division made several attempts to cross to the western bank of the river which were unsuccessful in part due to its artillery falling behind due to the winter weather. By the end of the 13th it was better prepared to force a crossing. Overnight on December 14/15 it got two rifle regiments across the river covered by fire from the third and was fighting for Ilino and Yabedino, 5 km (3.1 mi) west of Istra. By now the German positions along the Istra were deeply outflanked and their retreat continued, pursued by 16th Army towards Volokolamsk through to December 20. During this period the 9th Guards captured 199 motor vehicles, nine artillery pieces and nine tanks. By the 22nd it was closing up to the Ruza River, which formed the next German defense line. The next day the 16th Army regrouped to its right flank to resume the offensive on December 24, but the German line proved hard to crack and this effort gained little ground over the next days.

At the start of January, 1942 the division was on its Army's left flank linking to 5th Army to its south. On January 2 it reached a line from Danilkovo to Zakhryapino and over the next two weeks advanced from that line to the southwest which helped to force the German defenders to fall back from the Ruza in the direction of Gzhatsk. The 9th Guards continued to pursue and by January 20 had taken the villages of Soslavino, Isakovo and Potapovo while advancing in the direction of Myshkino. In three weeks the 16th Army had advanced 15 km (9.3 mi) along its center and from 22 to 25 km (14 to 16 mi) along its flanks. Later in January the division was transferred to the 33rd Army, still in Western Front.

=== Rzhev-Vyasma Operation ===
At the time of the transfer a strike group of three rifle divisions of 33rd Army had penetrated the German front south of Medyn in an effort to seize Vyasma, a vital rail hub in the German rear. 9th Guards was ordered to force-march 150 km (93 mi) in four days to reach Medyn, starting on January 27. At this time the rifle regiments were reduced to 250-300 personnel each, with several hundred horses missing and most of the motor transport in need of repair. Upon reaching Medyn General Beloborodov was ordered to join the battle from the march by entering a corridor up to 70 km (43 mi) long and about 8 km (5.0 mi) wide that led to the positions of the strike group. The leading 131st Rifle Regiment had entered the corridor on February 2 just as a counterstrike was launched by the 5th Panzer Division and other forces to cut it. Almost immediately Beloborodov received new orders moving the division to the command of 43rd Army; he was also to remove his forces from the corridor and strike back at the German pincers. In the event only one battalion of the 131st made it out while the other two and two companies of the sapper battalion were encircled.

Over the next two weeks the remainder of the division fought a series of battles for the village of Zakharovo, which was the key to relieving the encircled troops. The initial attacks were stymied largely due to a shortage of ammunition for the divisional artillery. On February 11 shells started arriving, along with 250 experienced replacements. A new plan was put together the next day which involved an early afternoon attack with a more sophisticated artillery preparation, an outflanking move to the south by the 258th Regiment, and close cooperation with the flanking 1st Guards Motor and 17th Rifle Divisions. The attack began at 1400 hours on February 13 and soon the 3rd Battalion of the 258th, using a deep ravine for cover, broke into the eastern outskirts of the village. Soon after the 40th Regiment, with the 33rd Ski Battalion, entered its north side. In a decisive move at 1600 hours two companies of the 258th on skis bypassed the village and cut the garrison's road to the rear. A relief column of tanks, armored halftracks and trucks was engaged and largely destroyed by antitank rifles, antitank guns, and the indirect fire of the 210th Howitzer Artillery Regiment. By evening the village was completely liberated, with few German troops escaping to the west.

Over the next ten days the German 17th Infantry Division, supported by tanks and aircraft, made several attempts to retake Zakharovo but these were held off while the 9th Guards continued to advance slowly towards the Vorya River into the former corridor. During this time the division received word that most of its sub-units had also been given Guards numbers. On February 27 the 18th and 22nd Guards Regiments began fighting for the village of Beryoza on the Vorya. The division was now approaching the area where the battalions of the now-31st Regiment had been encircled nearly a month earlier. Through tenuous communications the divisional command was aware that the survivors were still holding, and they began breaking out the following night as the division attacked towards the village of Berezki. Nearly all these men were evacuated to the field hospital, suffering from wounds, injuries or frostbite. In early March the division forced a bridgehead over the Vorya in cooperation with the 93rd and 415th Rifle Divisions and over the following days advanced towards the Ugra River in an effort to allow the still-encircled 33rd Army to escape westward. In the end only small groups and individuals were able to reach the 9th Guards sector, where the division remained until ordered to return to Medyn on April 16. As the division moved to the rear it was assigned to the 58th Army in the Reserve of the Supreme High Command and on April 22 it concentrated near the town of Kondrovo. On May 3 the division was decorated with the Order of the Red Banner, and the 22nd Guards Rifle Regiment also received the Order of Lenin.

== Operations Fridericus and Blue ==
As of June 1 the 9th Guards was officially in the 7th Reserve Army, but its rebuilding in the High Command reserves was interrupted on May 29 when it was ordered to board trains to join the 38th Army, commanded by Maj. Gen. K. S. Moskalenko, in Southwestern Front. The division was still far from complete, as indicated by the fact that as of July 3 it had only 12 antitank guns in total. 38th Army had been battered during the Second Battle of Kharkov and the division was badly needed to reinforce its right flank tying into 28th Army. On June 22 the German 1st Panzer and 6th Armies launched Operation Fridericus II as a follow-up to the Kharkov fighting and to set the stage for the main summer offensive. The German advance was generally swift, but on June 24-25 the motorized infantry of 16th Panzer Division met methodical and determined resistance from the 9th Guards on the approaches to the Moskovka and Oskol rivers near Kupiansk:

"Slowly the men advanced, alternating between rushing forward and providing covering fire, into the bewitched forest. They tried to move two kilometres eastward to the Moskovka, but machine gun fire threatened the flanks of the assault groups. The advance failed, and the battalion took cover. Wait for nightfall! Then the panzer grenadiers and tanks moved through the village. Suddenly the field exploded with the flash and crash of exploding fragments: Mines! Further advance was impossible; four tanks were lost... The sun came up at 0555 [hours], illuminating the railroad bridge... But the bridge was shattered in multiple places. On the opposite bank, the enemy detected the Germans and swept the approach roads with heavy fire."

This stand, supported by the 6th Guards Tank Brigade and 1st Destroyer (Antitank) Division, helped the remnants of the Army's 162nd, 199th, 278th and 304th Rifle Divisions to escape from encirclement and across the Oskol to a new defense line.

When Army Group South launched the second phase of Operation Blue on July 6 the 38th Army faced XVII Army Corps and XXXX Panzer Corps. The panzers made a spectacular advance on the first day but soon ran short of fuel. With what little remained a battlegroup of 3rd Panzer Division captured the Kalitva River bridges at Rossosh. This effort unhinged the defenses of Southwestern Front and 38th Army was authorized to retreat from the Oskol to a line situated 35–40 km (22–25 mi) to the east along the Aidar River. However the situation worsened when 3rd Panzer reached Olkhovatka on July 8. The 28th and 38th Armies were again threatened with envelopment and in response Moskalenko formed a combat group from the 9th Guards, 199th and 304th Rifle Divisions and 3rd Tank Brigade and dispatched it northward to form a covering screen between Rovenki and Kantemirovka, although the latter fell to XXXX Panzer before it could be reached. This move allowed these divisions to eventually withdraw north of the Don, and by August 1 the 9th Guards had been reassigned to 21st Army.

On July 21 the 18th Guards Rifle Regiment was awarded the Order of the Red Banner for its services. As of September 1 the division was assigned to 4th Reserve Army, which was located between 250 and 350 km (220 mi) northwest of Stalingrad. In a report issued on November 18 the head of the Wehrmacht's Foreign Armies East intelligence office, Col. R. Gehlen, noted the possible transfer of the 9th Guards from 21st Army to the Bely region near Rzhev as evidence, among other items, that a Soviet offensive at Stalingrad was unlikely. That offensive began the next day.

== Battle of Velikiye Luki ==
Gehlen had been correct about the transfer. By October 1 the division was still rebuilding in the Moscow Military District. On October 13 Kalinin Front received orders that several formations would be transferred to its command in the buildup to the forthcoming Operation Mars. Among these was the 5th Guards Rifle Corps to reinforce 43rd Army. The 9th Guards was directed to begin loading onto trains at Ryazan on October 13; and it had arrived in that Army by November 1. Just as it was arriving at Toropets General Beloborodov was given command of 5th Guards Corps and was replaced in command of the division by Maj. Gen. Ignatii Vasilevich Prostyakov. As plans for the winter offensive changed the 5th Guards Corps was soon sent to reinforce 3rd Shock Army, which launched an offensive to retake Velikiye Luki and Novosokolniki on November 25.

The Corps was to take the leading role in the offensive. After forcing a crossing of the Lovat River and bypassing Velikiye Luki to the southwest, its objective was to cut the rail lines from Velikiye Luki to Nevel and Velikiye Luki to Novosokolniki, and to link up with other forces of 3rd Shock advancing from the northeast to encircle the city. The 357th Rifle Division was to then storm the city from the west while the 9th Guards continued the advance on Novosokolniki. 46th Guards Rifle Division, on the left flank, was to cover the other two divisions against counterattacks from the southwest. On the eve of the offensive, forward detachments of all three divisions crossed the Lovat, suppressed the German advanced positions along the west bank, and then advanced to their main line along the Nevel railway; this reconnaissance-in-force both revealed much of the enemy fire plan and put artillery observers in position to direct fire against it in the opening preparation. As reinforcement, the 9th Guards was assigned the 36th Tank Regiment and the Corps' artillery regiment, the 41st Guards, consisting of 122mm guns and 152mm howitzers. Altogether, with its own assets and the divisional and regimental artillery, the Corps had about 45 barrels per kilometre on the breakthrough front. The Lovat is not wide (25 to 60 metres) but has a fast current, steep banks, and few good approaches.

The night of November 24 was foggy, which hindered German illumination flares as the Soviet forward detachments crossed the river and entered no-mans-land and the German advanced posts fell back to their main position. By 0800 hours on November 25 the Corps had seized a bridgehead of about 14 square kilometres, and the 18th Guards Regiment captured the villages of Pokorevo, Andreikino and Makarovo. However, the supporting tanks had fallen behind during the night approach. The fog lifted after 1000 hrs., allowing the 30-minute artillery preparation to begin. The infantry attack began at 1100 hrs., but developed slowly because the enemy fire system could not be fully suppressed. As the 357th Division attacked Peschanka it came under flanking fire from height 158.1, as did the 18th Guards advancing on Bogoroditskoye. The fighting for this village, dominated by a fortified schoolhouse, went on into the evening when three tanks finally arrived. This support and the direct fire of antitank guns helped clear the place by 2000 hours, after which the regiment advanced to the Velikiye Luki - Nevel railway. The 1st Battalion of the 22nd Guards Regiment seized height 158.1 and held it in the face of heavy German counterattacks. Meanwhile, the 508th Guards Rifle Regiment of the 46th Guards found a gap in the main German line, and over the next day exploited into the depth of their defense, with the 18th Guards Regiment ordered to support this advance early on November 26.

On the same day the rest of the 9th Guards was pushing towards Ostryan station, 10 km (6.2 mi) west of Velikiye Luki, to link up with the 381st Rifle Division advancing from the north to complete the outer ring of encirclement. The division's push faced several German counterattacks, including one by two companies of infantry supported by seven tanks which broke into the division's rear at Bogoroditskoye. General Prostyakov was forced to throw his reserves (the training battalion and two platoons of the 12th Reconnaissance Company) into battle to drive them back. During the night of November 27 the division's formations were restructured; the 22nd Regiment took up the defensive on a wide front while the 31st Regiment was brought in to assist the 18th in the breakthrough. On the same night a group of scouts from the division penetrated into the German rear and took prisoners, confirming that a regiment of the 3rd Mountain Division had arrived from Novosokolniki and tanks of the 20th Panzergrenadier Division were appearing from Nevel. During fighting that day with German infantry and tanks the commander of the 31st Regiment, Col. Nikolai Gavrilovich Dokuchaev, was mortally wounded; he was replaced by his deputy, Maj. A. I. Belev. On November 28 the 9th Guards and 357th Divisions linked up with the 381st which created an inner pocket of the Velikiye Luki garrison and an outer pocket of the remaining defending forces, consisting of two regiments of 83rd Infantry Division and the 138th Mountain Regiment, which were holding out in and around the village of Shiripino.

The division's next objective was to eliminate the Shiripino grouping so it could not become a stepping stone to the relief of the Velikiye Luki garrison for the German reinforcements that were arriving. The pocket measured about 4 km (2.5 mi) by 3 km (1.9 mi), with six main strongpoints and several smaller ones, held by about 1,400 infantry, reinforced with artillery, mortars and tanks. In total the division had 12 battalions of its own or attached, plus the 27th Tank Regiment and an Army artillery group. Its attack was set to begin on the evening of December 2 but just as the artillery preparation was to begin, word arrived that the expected German relief attempt had begun; the lines of the 508th Guards Rifle Regiment of 46th Guards Division had been penetrated and by morning the attackers reached the pocket. The Soviet commanders on the ground organized counterattacks to prevent any further advance. The howitzers of the 28th Guards Artillery Regiment suppressed the German artillery allowing a company of the 31st Regiment to enter and clear the strongpoint at Fedkovo while the 18th Regiment did similarly at Markovo and the 22nd Regiment took control of Telezhnikovo and Zaboynikovo. Although the German command was successful in evacuating some of its encircled troops, it was unable to hold its ground, and when the lines stabilized the distance to Velikiye Luki had barely lessened.

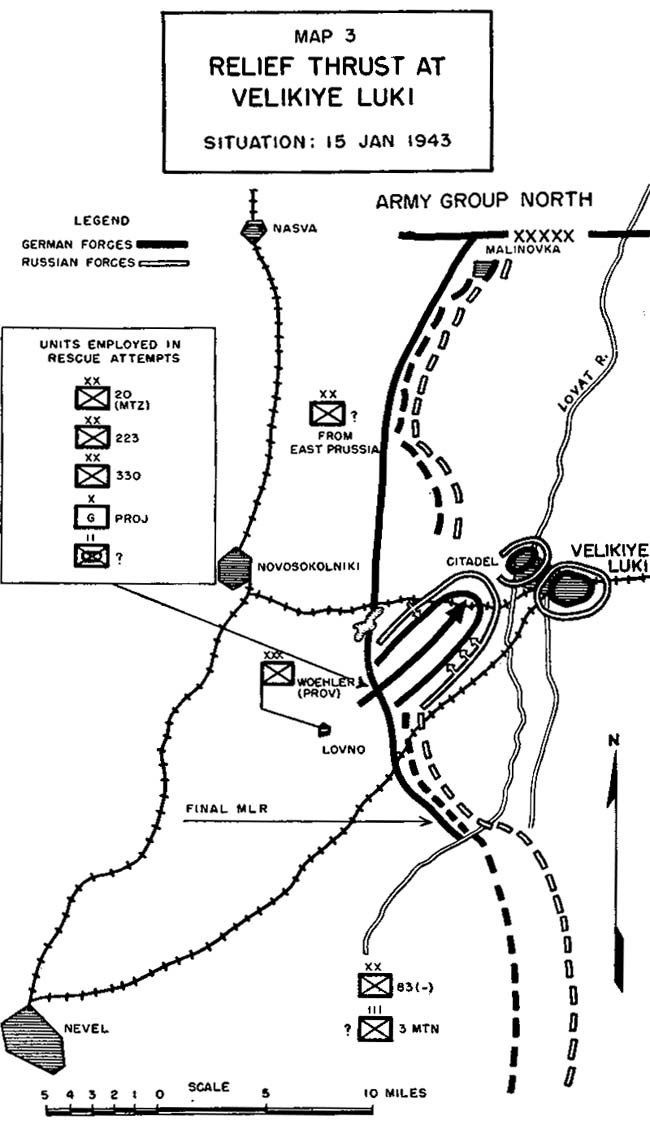
German relief attempts. (Notice that the order of battle given on this 1952 map is not accurate.)

Over the next week the 5th Guards Corps fought off several German counterattacks while advancing slowly westward. On December 10 the 357th Division was reassigned to direct Army control, which forced the 9th Guards to cover a wider sector. The following night the 3rd Battalion of the 22nd Regiment took over a new 4 km-wide (2.5 mi) sector and the same afternoon a new German relief attempt struck the sector with artillery and two infantry battalions; these managed to advance 2–2.5 km (1.2–1.6 mi) before being halted by another battalion of the Regiment. Interpreting this as a reconnaissance-in-force the Army commander, Maj. Gen. K. N. Galitskii, reinforced the Corps with the 19th Guards Rifle Division, and its 61st Guards Rifle Regiment was subordinated to the 9th Guards. Over the next week the relief force launched daily attacks backed by tanks and aircraft probing for weaknesses in the Soviet defense. On December 14 an attack by two regiments of the 291st Infantry Division managed to capture the village of Gromovo, but were thrown back by the 18th Regiment. By the 16th the front had become relatively quiet.

On the night of December 19 the Army reported that the 20th Panzergrenadiers had concentrated behind the 291st Infantry and both were expected to again strike the 9th Guards sector. The new relief operation began at 0930 hours and soon the 18th and 22nd Regiments were struck by about 23 tanks and four battalions of infantry in the Gromovo area. The 41st Guards Artillery was called in on the approaches to the village which helped delay its fall until about noon, after which the attackers advanced another 300m at the junction of the two regiments. Beloborodov intervened by ordering forward the main forces of the 19th Guards. By 1430 hours the 18th Regiment was making a fighting withdrawal to Plekhnovo and Maksimikha and the 22nd was forced to refuse its left flank. About 20 German tanks with infantry advanced into the gap before stumbling into a minefield and coming under direct artillery fire which jointly cost them six vehicles knocked out and forced a withdrawal. At 1500 hours the skies cleared; airstrikes and artillery fire forced both of the regiments to pull farther back. General Prostyakov filled the gap with the 61st Guards Regiment and the 6th Guards Machine Gun Battalion, which halted the advance. By the end of the day the 18th Regiment had fallen back 900m, while the other regiments had retreated from 300 to 500m.

The following night General Galitskii sent further reinforcements, including medium and heavy artillery that had been supporting the siege of the city. During the morning the axis of the attack was shifted northwards in the direction of Height 174.4 and through the afternoon further combined arms attacks secured the height and drove the 18th Regiment back a further 500-600m. On December 21 the German forces concentrated about 40 tanks and 2,000 infantry on a narrow sector in an effort to get around the flanks of the 22nd Regiment and break through to the village of Alekseykovo. The Regiment was forced to fall back 2 km (1.2 mi) but despite this success the offensive paused through the next day. The 23rd saw another attempt to reach the Velikiye Luki - Novosokolniki railway to the north but this made no progress at the cost of significant losses. On the morning of December 24 the 360th Rifle Division was transferred to the 5th Guards Corps and immediately retook Alekseykovo and Height 179.0; the German grouping was forced over to the defensive.

The relief effort was renewed on January 4, 1943 when two German regiments and about 50 tanks struck the 1193rd Rifle Regiment of the 360th Division and broke through an hour later. As the breakthrough widened, part of the German force turned north towards the railway while a second part moved south against the right flank of the 9th Guards. Another strike group had retaken Alekseykovo and was moving on Ivantsovo. A counterattack by the 1193rd Regiment, the 100th Rifle Brigade and the 45th Tank Regiment in the afternoon failed to retake Ivantsovo but forced the attack to stop there. A further German group, including 17 tanks, pressed to the rear of the 9th Guards and captured Borshanka, but they were turned out later that afternoon by the 18th Regiment supported by the 107th Guards Mortar Battalion. Since the front of the 46th Guards Division remained quiet one of its regiments was transferred to the 9th Guards overnight.

By the morning of January 5 the German force managed to reach to within 1000m of the railway, but despite the introduction of two further divisions, the 331st and 707th Infantry Divisions, the next day, the 5th Guards Corps was also reinforced and the attack made no progress. By January 12 the relief force was completely exhausted, 3 km (1.9 mi) short of the western outskirts of the city. Early on January 17 the German garrison there surrendered, with about 4,000 men being made prisoners.

== Into Belarus ==
In February the division was moved to the 4th Shock Army and then in March to 43rd Army, still in Kalinin Front. In May it joined the 2nd Guards Rifle Corps, which was commanded by Maj. Gen. Mikhail Pavlovich Kutuzov, under direct command of the Front. During fighting in the village of Zhukovka in the Smolensk region on August 28 Guardsman Vasilii Ivanovich Solovyov of the 31st Regiment burst into a German trench with his squadmates and helped destroy two machine guns with grenades. Continuing to advance they came under heavy fire from a concealed bunker. After failing to throw a grenade through the embrasure, he blocked it with his body and was killed. On June 4, 1944 Sovolyov was posthumously made a Hero of the Soviet Union.

As of October 1 the 9th Guards had rejoined the 5th Guards Corps which was now in 39th Army. Following the liberation of Smolensk in September, Kalinin Front launched an offensive in the direction of Vitebsk. This began with an assault on the German positions at Rudnya, led by the 1st Penal Battalion and a mobile group from 43rd Army and followed by three divisions of the Corps while 9th Guards remained in second echelon. Rudnya was liberated on September 29.

As of November 1 the 5th Guards Corps (9th, 17th and 19th Guards Rifle Divisions) was still in 39th Army. In early November, Army Gen. A. I. Yeryomenko, commander of the recently renamed 1st Baltic Front, ordered the 43rd and 39th Armies to concentrate north of the Smolensk - Vitebsk railroad and highway in order to renew the advance on the latter city, which had slowed significantly over the past weeks. The assault was to open on November 8 against the positions of the German 206th and 14th Infantry Divisions. Although the divisions of the two Soviet armies were worn down to about half strength from earlier fighting, they still held a five-fold advantage in infantry, as well as superiority in armor and artillery. The offensive, in which the 9th Guards had a leading role, began as planned and opened a gap on a 10 km (6.2 mi) front by the next day, and gained as much as 10 km (6.2 mi) in depth over 10 days of fighting, before the German forces were able to rebuild a continuous front. During this drive, on November 12 the 18-year-old Guards Sen. Sgt. Vladimir Efimovich Smirnov, a squad leader of the division, led the defense against German counterattacks on the village of Derebische, accounting for 12 German soldiers himself. Two days later, during a battle for a height near the village of Shumshino, Smirnov discovered a hidden German machine-gun post and flung himself upon it, at the cost of his life. On June 4, 1944 he was posthumously made a Hero of the Soviet Union.

39th Army, this time with 5th Guards Corps in the lead, began another joint offensive with 43rd Army on December 19, again striking the defenses of 14th Infantry east of Vitebsk, on the Borok - Goriane sector, backed by nearly 100 tanks. The attack made very limited gains, and 5th Guards Corps was withdrawn and sent south of the Smolensk - Vyasma road on December 21, with the entire offensive shut down two days later. This redeployment was made in order to reinforce a new assault by 33rd Army on this sector, which began on December 23. 9th Guards was deployed on the Corps' left (south) flank, with the immediate objective of the village of Laputi, although the overall goal of the offensive was to link up with 4th Shock Army and encircle the German forces in Vitebsk. By December 26, 5th Guards Corps had advanced a mere 2–3 km, leading to a caustic telegram from the STAVKA to the 1st Baltic Front, demanding greater progress. Despite this, 39th Army only managed to gain another 1–2 km by December 28 before stalling completely, while 33rd Army soldiered on until January 6, 1944.

The offensive was renewed on January 8. 5th Guards Corps formed 39th Army's shock group on a 6 km-wide (3.7 mi) between the Smolensk - Vitebsk road and the village of Vaskova, facing the 206th Infantry Division. The division was in the first echelon, with 19th Guards and 91st Guards Rifle Divisions, backed by two tank brigades and the 17th Guards in second echelon. By now these divisions were at less than 40 percent of authorized strength. Although the German forces were similarly weakened, 5th Guards Corps' attack floundered after an advance of only about 1000m. Although 33rd and 5th Armies to the south made greater progress, it was at a heavy cost, and the offensive was finally shut down late in the month. On January 30 General Prostyakov was given command of the 8th Guards Rifle Corps in 11th Guards Army, and was replaced by Col. Porfirii Martynovich Gudz.

Through the rest of January and most of February 5th Guards Corps was in reserve in 39th Army, which had been reassigned to Western Front. Near the end of the month it was ordered the Karamidy region astride the familiar Smolensk - Vitebsk road. A new offensive began on February 29, but just prior to its start the German command withdrew several units east of Vitebsk, including the 206th Infantry, back to shorter and more defensible lines. The STAVKA took this as a preliminary to a full withdrawal from the Vitebsk salient, and ordered a pursuit. This soon turned into yet another bloody frontal assault against fixed defenses. 9th Guards was in the first echelon but even after the commitment of 19th Guards Division on March 5 it was clear that the operation was a failure, after gaining just several hundred metres (apart from the voluntary withdrawals) at heavy cost. This marked the end of major fighting on this sector until summer.

=== Operation Bagration ===
Later in March the 9th Guards returned to 2nd Guards Corps which was now part of 6th Guards Army; it would remain under these commands for the duration of the war. In preparation for the summer offensive the subunits of the division fought many small actions to gain information on German deployment and fire plans. On May 18 Jr. Lt. Anatoly Grigorevich Myagchilov was ordered to break through the German lines in the Idritsa district with his platoon of the 18th Guards Regiment to make a passage for a reconnaissance party and to then seize a hill to cover its withdrawal. The hill was taken but only Myagchilov and six of his men remained when their position came under artillery and mortar fire. During the following counterattacks 50 German infantrymen and two officers were killed or wounded. Myagchilov, who had been wounded in the face by mortar fragments, took his own life to avoid capture. On July 22 he was posthumously made a Hero of the Soviet Union.

On June 6 Colonel Gudz handed his command to Maj. Gen. Nikolai Ivanovich Babakhin, who had previously commanded the 71st Guards Rifle Division. In the three nights before the Soviet summer offensive the 6th Guards made an approach march of 110 km (68 mi) to a new sector of 1st Baltic Front 30 km (19 mi) wide that had been vacated by 43rd Army to the south. This move was not noticed by the German command until the battle began on June 22. 2nd Guards Corps was in the Army's second echelon and even on the second and third days was struggling to keep up with the lead elements which had reached the Western Dvina River but not yet broken through the German defenses there. This was left to 2nd Guards Corps on June 25 which forced a crossing at Beshankovichy with support from the 3rd Air Army, followed by the 1st Rifle Corps of 43rd Army. By June 28 there were two large gaps to the north and south of the retreating German IX Army Corps and the 6th Guards was pushing into both. The previous night the 2nd Guards Corps and 1st Tank Corps had attacked the 252nd Infantry Division and only 300 of its men had managed to escape. By the afternoon of June 29 the remnants of IX Corps were holding a small semi-circle about 75 km (47 mi) southwest of Polotsk with a gap over 50 km (31 mi) wide stretching to its north, giving 6th Guards Army free rein to advance towards the Baltic states. On the same day, while the 18th and 22nd Regiments were mopping up defeated German forces from the forests around Selishche and Zhuravno, General Babakhin was killed in the explosion of an antitank mine. He was replaced the following day by Col. Yakov Yakovlevich Verbov.

== Baltic Offensives ==
As of July 8 the 9th Guards was located not far west of Polotsk, while most of its Army had advanced as far as Sharkawshchyna. On July 21 Colonel Verbov was succeeded in command by Col. Valerii Ivanovich Savchuk. During fighting for the village of Plusy, 20 km (12 mi) north of Braslaw in Belarus on July 24 Guards Captain Ivan Nikitivich Volchkov, commander of a rifle platoon of the 22nd Guards Regiment, led the defense of an important height nearby during counterattacks by German infantry and tanks. Despite being wounded he refused to leave the battlefield and was eventually killed in a desperate attack at the head of five remaining men. On March 24, 1945 he was posthumously recognized as a Hero of the Soviet Union.

By August 1 the division had caught up with 6th Guards Army and had crossed the border into Lithuania, into the vicinity of Rokiškis. Two weeks later, when Operation Doppelkopf began, the division was on the defense north of Biržai. Once this counteroffensive was dealt with the 9th Guards continued to advance westward into Lithuania during September and October. On October 31 the 31st Guards Rifle Regiment received recognition for its role in the occupation of Šiauliai with the award of the Order of the Red Banner.

The division saw three more changes of command before the war ended. On November 2 Maj. Gen. Dmitrii Semenovich Kuropatenko succeeded Colonel Savchuk, but he in turn was replaced on December 21 by Lt. Col. Fyodor Girgorevich Krivomlin. Finally, on January 28, 1945 Col. Bauyrzhan Momyshuly took over command. Momyshuly was by now a minor celebrity in the USSR following the publication of Aleksandr Bek's novel Volokolamsk Highway the previous year; the main character is a lightly-fictionalized version of him serving as a battalion commander in the 316th Rifle Division in front of Moscow in October, 1941.

6th Guards Army moved to the Kurland Group in Leningrad Front in March, where it remained for the duration. Following the German surrender the division carried the full title: 9th Guards Rifle, Order of the Red Banner Division. (Russian: 9-я гвардейская стрелковая Краснознаменная дивизия.) It was disbanded later that year.
