= 8th Guards Motor Rifle Division =

Kyrgyz Armed Forces formation

8th Guards Motor Rifle Panfilov Division
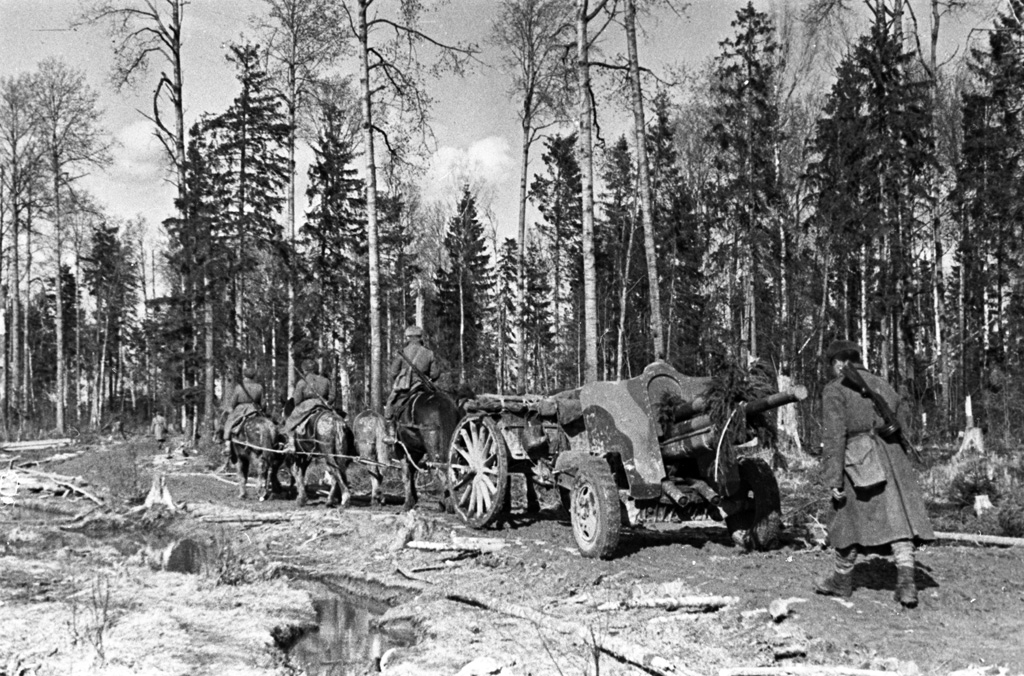
- A gun and carriage of the division's 19th Guards Rifle Regiment near the front, 1943.
- Active: 12 July 1941 – January 2003; 11 July 2011 – present
- Country: Soviet Union (1941–1991); Kyrgyzstan (1992–2003, 2011–present)
- Branch: Soviet Army (1941–1991); Kyrgyz Army (1992–2003, 2011–present)
- Type: Motorized infantry division
- Garrison/HQ: Tokmok
- Nickname: Panfilov's Men
- March: March of the Panfilov Division
- Anniversaries: 12 July (formation day)
- Engagements: World War II
- Battle honours: Rezhitskaya

Commanders
- Current commander: Colonel Berdibek Asanov
- Notable commanders: Ivan Panfilov

The 8th Guards Motor Rifle Panfilov Division (Russian: 8-я гвардейская Панфиловская дивизия; Kyrgyz: 8-гвардиялык мотоаткычтар Панфилов дивизиясынын) originally the 316th Rifle Division, is a motorized infantry division of the Armed Forces of the Kyrgyz Republic. Formed as a Soviet Red Army division during World War II, it was dissolved in 2003 but established anew in 2011. Its full title is 8th Guards Rezhitskaya Motorized Rifle Division Named after Hero of the Soviet Union Major General Ivan Vasilyevich Panfilov, awarded the Orders of Lenin, the Red Banner and Suvorov.

== History ==
=== Formation ===
After Nazi Germany invaded the Soviet Union on 22 June 1941, reserves were mobilized to be sent to the front. On 12 July 1941, the 316th Rifle Division was established in Alma Ata, the capital of the Kazakh SSR. Major General Ivan Panfilov, the military commissar of the Kirghiz SSR, was appointed its commander. The reservists allotted to the 316th were mostly from the two republics. It consisted of:

- 1073th Rifle Regiment
- 1075th Rifle Regiment
- 1077th Rifle Regiment
- 857th Artillery Regiment
- 597th Sapper Battalion

The 316th's soldiers were sworn in on 1 August, and boarded trains to the front from the 18th to the 20th. They arrived in Borovichi, near Malaya Vishera, in late August. Intense fighting against the Germans had already taken place in the region, as part of the campaign to defend Leningrad from the attack of Army Group North. The 316th was involved in several skirmishes, but on 8 September was consigned as the reserve of the 52nd Army. It spent a month in the rear.

=== Battle of Moscow ===
In early October, the Germans began their offensive on Moscow. On 7 October, Panfilov's division was transferred to the vicinity of the Soviet capital, arriving on the 11th. It was assigned to Konstantin Rokossovsky's 16th Army (Western Front), and ordered to defend a 41-km long sector along the Ruza River, especially the highway passing through Volokolamsk. The 316th was reinforced with the 690th Rifle Regiment from the 126th Rifle Division, as well as the 289th and 296th Anti-tank Regiments.

On 14 October, the German XLVI Panzer Corps attacked with superior forces. By the 27th, they had advanced some thirty kilometers, pushing the 316th back to Volokolamsk. On 28 October, after a day of fighting, the city was occupied. Panfilov's soldiers retreated closer to Moscow.

The German Army resumed its offensive on 15 November. In the meantime, the 316th had received some of the first PTRD anti-tank rifles. On the 16th, the 46th Panzer Corps engaged the 316th in its new line of defense, near the village of Dubosekovo. Soviet newspapers later reported that twenty-eight soldiers from the division's 1075th Regiment destroyed eighteen enemy tanks while fighting to the last; although the story gained wide publicity, it was later revealed to be exaggerated.

The threat to the 16th Army's flank forced the Stavka to send in the reserve 78th Rifle Division. Although they were forced to retreat after three days, the German advance ceased due to the Soviets' resistance and the harsh weather conditions.

On 17 November, Joseph Stalin as People's Commissar of Defense passed a decree to promote the 316th to a Guards formation, in recognition of the role it played in defending the capital; it sustained 9,920 casualties, including 3,620 soldiers killed in action and 6,300 wounded. Marshal Dmitry Yazov, who researched the division's history, wrote that it considerably delayed the enemy's march on Moscow in its sector.

On the 18th, a group of journalists traveled to Panfilov's headquarters in the village of Guseniovo, and told him of the news. As he briefed them in the open, they came under a mortar attack. The general was killed by a shell splinter. The decree came into effect on that very day, turning the 316th to the 8th Guards Rifle Division; it also received the Order of the Red Banner. It was named in honor of Panfilov on 23 November, thus becoming one of the only two Red Army divisions to be named after their commanders, along with the Chapayevska. As a Guards Division the numbering of its subordinate units was as follows:

- 19th Guards Rifle Regiment – from 1073rd Rifle Regiment
- 23rd Guards Rifle Regiment – from 1075rd Rifle Regiment
- 30th Guards Rifle Regiment – from 1077rd Rifle Regiment
- 27th Guards Artillery Regiment – from 857th Artillery Regiment
- 2nd Guards Sapper Battalion – from 597th Sapper Battalion

The 8th Guards took part in the December counteroffensive in Moscow, liberating the villages of Kryukovo and Istra.

=== Remainder of war ===
During late January 1942, the 8th Guards was assigned to the 2nd Guards Rifle Corps of Northwestern Front, and participated in the battles near the Demyansk Pocket; for its performance during the operation, it was collectively awarded the Order of Lenin on 16 March. In June, still in 2nd Guards Corps, it was transferred to 3rd Shock Army in Kalinin Front. In late 1942, the 30th Guards Rifle Regiment fought as a separate unit in the Battle of Velikiye Luki near the Lovat River. In 1944, it took part in the Leningrad–Novgorod Offensive and later, in the battle of Rēzekne; for its role in taking the city and the surrounding region, it was awarded the honorary title Rezhitskaya on 27 July 1944. On 3 November, the division received the Order of Suvorov 2nd Class. The 8th Guards ended the war with the 10th Guards Army, as part of the forces besieging Courland.

According to Soviet official reports, during World War II the division killed or disabled 85,000 enemy troops, captured 5,000 more and destroyed or captured 387 tanks, 65 other armored vehicles, 43 planes, 451 guns, 180 mortars, 2010 automobiles and 328 motorcycles. In total, the soldiers of the division were awarded twenty-nine Orders of Lenin, 371 Orders of the Red Banner, two Orders of Kutuzov, eight Orders of Suvorov, fifty-three Orders of Alexander Nevsky, one Order of Bogdan Khmelnitsky, 391 Orders of the Patriotic War 1st class, 1783 Orders of the Patriotic War 2nd Class, 4747 Orders of the Red Star, forty-one Orders of Glory 2nd degree and 2061 Orders of Glory 3rd degree.

Thirty-four soldiers received the highest Soviet military decoration, Hero of the Soviet Union. The first was Major General Ivan Panfilov himself, posthumously. Panfilov's Twenty-Eight Guardsmen were also all awarded the title posthumously; when six of them were revealed to be alive, two were stripped of it. The other wartime Heroes were Piotr Vikhrev, Malik Gabdulin, Ivan Shapshaev and Tulegen Tokhtarov. Baurzhan Momyshuly received the honor in 1991, three years after his death.

=== Post-war ===
The 8th Guards Division was stationed at Haapsalu in the Estonian SSR with the 4th Guards Rifle Corps after the war. On 25 June 1957, it became a motor rifle division. It was disbanded on 18 March 1960. On 23 May, the 36th Guards Motor Rifle Division at Klooga was redesignated as the 8th Guards Motor Rifle Division, inheriting the honors of the previous formation. Then it was recalled to Frunze, Kyrgyzstan in May 1967 and assigned to the 17th Army Corps of the Turkestan Military District.

=== Independence years ===
After the dissolution of the Soviet Union, it became part of the Kyrgyz Armed Forces, but was disbanded in January 2003.

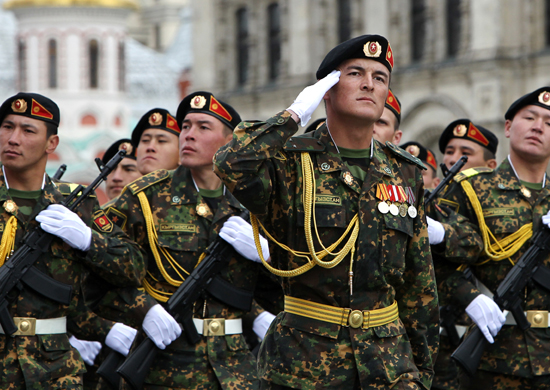
The parade contingent from the division on Red Square in 2010.

On 11 July 2011, on the eve of the division's 70th anniversary, the 8th Guards was re-established in a ceremony attended by President Roza Otunbayeva and Defence Minister Abibilla Kudayberdiev. The year before, the predecessor of the unit took part in the 2010 Moscow Victory Day Parade on Red Square. It is now garrisoned in Tokmok and commanded by Colonel Berdibek Asanov. The combat banner of the division was carried on Red Square by the Military Institute of the Armed Forces during the military parade in Moscow in 2020.

On its 80th anniversary in 2021, servicemen of the division marched to Panfilov Park.

== Legacy ==
During 1943 and 1944, war reporter Alexander Bek escorted the 8th Guards. Drawing from the memories of Major Baurzhan Momyshuly, he authored a book, Volokolamsk Highway (known also as Panfilov's Men), about the fighting near the city. After the war, in 1960 and 1961, he completed two sequels, Several Days and General Panfilov's Reserve. The trilogy described the experiences of Momyshuly as a battalion commander, from the formation of the division in Alma Ata until the Soviet counter-offensive in Moscow.

Bek's Volokolamsk Highway served as one of the settings for an eponymous series of five plays by Heiner Müller, written from 1984 to 1987. The first part, "Russian Opening", was based on Heinrich von Kleist's The Prince of Homburg. In Müller's reinterpretation, Momyshuly assumes the role of the Great Elector. Beside Bek's trilogy, Momyshuly himself authored his accounts on the division's fighting near Moscow.

A copy of the divisional banner is located at the Military History Museum of Almaty.

== Commanders ==
=== Soviet Period ===
- Major General Ivan Panfilov (12.07.1941 – 18.11.1941);
- Major General Vasily Reviakin (20.11.1941 – 18.01.1942);
- Major General Ivan Chistyakov (19.01.1942 – 03.04.1942);
- Colonel Ivan Serebryakov (04.04.1942 – 18.10.1942);
- Major General Spiridon Chernyugov (19.10.1942 – 12.03.1944);
- Colonel Dmitry Dulov (13.03.1944 – 28.05.1944);
- Major General Ernst Sedulin (29.05.1944 – 07.06.1944);
- Major General Andrei Kuleshov (08.06.1944 – 17.08.1944);
- Colonel Grigory Panishev (18.08.1944 – 07.09.1944);
- Colonel Grigory Lomov (08.09.1944 – 09.05.1945);
- Major-General Ivan Belayev (06.01.1945 – 01.1946);
- Major-General Mikhail Seryugin (01.1946 – 07.1946);
- Major-General Pyotr Romanenko (07.1946 – 03.1947);
- Major-General Mikhail Papchenko (03.1947 – 07.1949);
- Major General Nikolai Lysenko (08.1949 – 09.1952);
- Major-General Vasily Larin (01.1953 – 11.1955);
- Major-General Yevgeny Shundalov (11.1955 – 06.1959);
- Colonel Vasily Bachilo (06.1959 – 08.1960);
- Major General Valentin Luk'yanov (1985 – 1991).

=== Since Independence ===
- Colonel Ryskeldi Musayev (1998 – 2001);
- Colonel Nurdin Tursunaliev (2001 – 2003);
- Colonel Melis Satybaldiev (2011 – 2013);
- Colonel Artur Temirov (2013 – 2015);
- Colonel Nurlan Kiresheyev (2015 – 2016);
- Colonel Baktybek Bekbolotov (2016 – 2017);
- Colonel Talantbek Ergeshov (2017 – 2019);
- Colonel Berdibek Asanov (2019 – present)

== Command staff during the Battle of Moscow ==
- Commander: Ivan Panfilov.
- Chief of staff: Colonel Ivan Serebryakov.
- Commissar: Senior Battalion Commissar (Lt. Colonel) Sergei Egorov.
- Chief of political department: Battalion Commissar (Major) Alexander Galushko.
- Chief of divisional artillery: Major Vitaly Makarov.
- 1073th Infantry Regiment: commanded by Major Grigory Efimovich Elin.
- 1075th Infantry Regiment: commanded by Colonel Ilya Kaprov.
- 1077 Infantry Regiment: commanded by Major Zinovi Shechtmann.
