= Panfilovtsy =

Panfilovtsy (Панфиловцы; Russian for "Panfilov's men") may refer to:

- The 316th Division, that was renamed the Panfilov 8th Guards Rifle Division in honor its fallen commander, General Ivan Panfilov. Its soldiers were known as Panfilovtsy.
- Panfilov's Twenty-Eight Guardsmen, a group of soldiers from the Division who were all awarded the title Hero of the Soviet Union
