= Bauyrzhan Momyshuly =

Kazakh-Soviet military officer and author

- Бауыржан Момышұлы
- Bauyrzhan in 1941
- Born: 24 December 1910; Orak Balga, Syr-Darya Oblast, Russian Empire (now Jualy District, Jambyl Region, Kazakhstan)
- Died: 10 June 1982 (aged 71); Alma-Ata, Kazakh SSR, Soviet Union (now Almaty, Kazakhstan)
- Burial place: Kensai Cemetery, Almaty
- Military career
- Allegiance: Soviet Union
- Service years: 1932–1934; 1936–1955
- Rank: Colonel
- Unit: Mounted troops
- Commands: 9th Guards Rifle Division
- Conflicts: Battle of Lake Khasan; World War II; Eastern Front
- Awards: Military: Hero of the Soviet Union; Order of Lenin; Order of the Red Banner (2x); Order of the Red Star; Order of the Patriotic War; Medal "For the Victory over Germany in the Great Patriotic War 1941–1945"; Medal "For the Defence of Moscow"; Medal for Battle Merit; Civilian: People's Hero of Kazakhstan; Order of the Red Banner of Labour; Order of Friendship of Peoples; Order of the Badge of Honour

Bauyrzhan Momyshuly, also spelled Baurjan Momish-Uli (Note: While publications of the Kazakh government use the first version, all the English translations of Alexander Bek's books use the second.) (Kazakh: Бауыржан Момышұлы, Bauyrjan Momyşūly; Russified: Бауыржан Момышулы; 24 December [O.S. 11 December] 1910 – 10 June 1982) was a Soviet Kazakh military officer and author, posthumously awarded with the titles Hero of the Soviet Union and People's Hero of Kazakhstan.

== Biography ==
=== Early life ===
Bauyrzhan was born in Orak Balga, a now abandoned Aul in the modern Jualy District in southern Kazakhstan, to a family of nomadic herders from the Dulat tribe. He lived with his relatives until the age of thirteen, but spent his teenage years in Soviet boarding schools. After completing his secondary education in 1929, he worked as a teacher, a secretary of a district committee and as an assistant-prosecutor. He was later employed as a department chief in the Kazakh ASSR's Central Agency for Economic Planning.

In November 1932, Bauyrzhan was conscripted for a two-year service in the Red Army, and posted as a cadet in the 14th Mountain Infantry Regiment. After his discharge, he studied a course in economics in the Leningrad Institute of Finance and worked in the Kazakh branch of the Commercial-Industrial Soviet State Bank.

=== Military career ===
On 25 March 1936, Bauyrzhan was again called for military service, becoming a platoon commander in the Central Asian Military District's 315th Regiment. He remained in the military for the next two decades. In March 1937, the regiment was transferred to the Far Eastern Front in Siberia. While not subject to repression during the Great Purge, the remark "unreliable, with extreme nationalist views" was inscribed in his personal dossier in 1937. His biographer, Mekemtas Myrzakhmetov, believed this happened because Bauyrzhan was known to read the poetry of Magzhan Zhumabayev and works of other authors associated with the Alash Orda.

In 1939, Bauyrzhan was assigned to command the 105th Infantry Division's artillery. From February 1940, he headed the 202nd Independent Anti-Tank Battalion, based in Zhytomyr.

In January, the following year, Lieutenant Bauyrzhan returned to Kazakhstan, serving in Alma-Ata's military commissariat. When Germany invaded the Soviet Union on 22 June, he was appointed a battalion commander – Kombat – in the 1073rd Regiment of the newly formed 316th Rifle Division, headed by the military commissar of the Kirghiz SSR, Major General Ivan Panfilov.

=== World War II ===
In September 1941, the division was sent to the front in Malaya Vishera, in the vicinity of Leningrad. During October, as the Wehrmacht advanced on Moscow, the 316th – now part of General Konstantin Rokossovsky's 16th Army – was transferred to the theater and tasked with defending the highway passing through the city of Volokolamsk and the surrounding area. Bauyrzhan's battalion was assigned an eight-kilometer-long sector along the Ruza River; Senior Lieutenant Bauyrzhan took part in 27 engagements during the defense of the Soviet capital. From 16 to 18 November, he and his unit were cut off from the rest of the division in the village of Matryonino, yet managed to hold off the German forces and eventually broke out back to their lines. For its performances, the 316th was awarded the status of a Guards formation on 23 November, and named the Panfilov 8th Guards Rifle Division in honor of its fallen commander, who was killed in action on 18 November. In late November, Bauyrzhan was promoted to the rank of captain.

Bauyrzhan participated in the Soviet counter-offensive and was severely wounded on 5 December, though he declined to be evacuated to receive treatment.

In March 1942, war correspondent Alexander Bek arrived in the 8th Guards Division. During the spring of that year, Bek convinced Bauyrzhan, who was reluctant at first, to cooperate with him in writing a novel about the fighting in Volokolamsk, which would eventually be published in 1944 under the title Volokolamsk Highway. Bauyrzhan strongly disapproved of Bek's book, which he claimed to be an unrealistic depiction of events, and criticized the author relentlessly for the remainder of his life.

In April 1942, his commanding officer approved his promotion to the rank of major. In August 1942, his superiors had submitted a highly positive report on his conduct, and he was recommended to be awarded the title Hero of the Soviet Union. The proposal was rejected. The poet Mikhail Isinaliev, a friend of Bauyrzhan, wrote that a former political officer from the 8th Guards told him that this was due to his Kazakh patriotism, which was regarded as dangerous nationalism by the unit's commissars. Bauyrzhan joined the Communist Party during the same year. In October, he was promoted to the rank of lieutenant colonel. After eight months, he became a colonel.

During 1943, due to the effects of his old injury, he was forced to rest in a hospital for a prolonged period. After being released from the hospital in March 1944, he underwent an advanced officers' course in the Voroshilov Academy. On 21 January 1945, Colonel Baurzhan was appointed as the commander of the 9th Guards Rifle Division, a unit of the 2nd Guards Rifle Corps in the 1st Baltic Front's 6th Guards Army. The 9th participated in the East Prussian offensive, taking fifteen towns near the city of Priekule. After the war ended, Bauyrzhan was awarded the Order of Lenin.

=== Post-war years ===
In 1946, Bauyrzhan entered the Voroshilov Academy again. On 16 June 1948, the Kazakh SSR's Council of Ministers appointed him as chief of the republic's Voluntary Society for Cooperation with the Armed Forces, while he still served in the military. In late 1948, he became deputy commander of the 49th Independent Infantry Brigade in the East Siberian Military District. From 1950, he served as a senior lecturer in the Red Army's Military Academy of Logistics and Transport. According to Myrzakhmetov, he was the only one of the 500 officers who graduated with him to never receive the rank of a General; the author claimed this was due to a political decision to deny Turkic people a high status in the Soviet Armed Forces.

In 1955, Colonel Bauyrzhan retired from the army due an illness. He turned to a literary career, writing several novels as well as books about his wartime experiences. He was also a lecturer in the Kazakhstan Academy of Sciences.

In 1963, at the invitation of Raúl Castro, Colonel Bauyrzhan travelled to Cuba, where he lectured members of the Cuban Revolutionary Armed Forces on tactics.

Bauyrzhan is mainly known for his appearance in Bek's Volokolamsk Highway. The author wrote two sequels, Several Days and General Panfilov's Reserve. The series gained international, as well as Soviet, recognition.

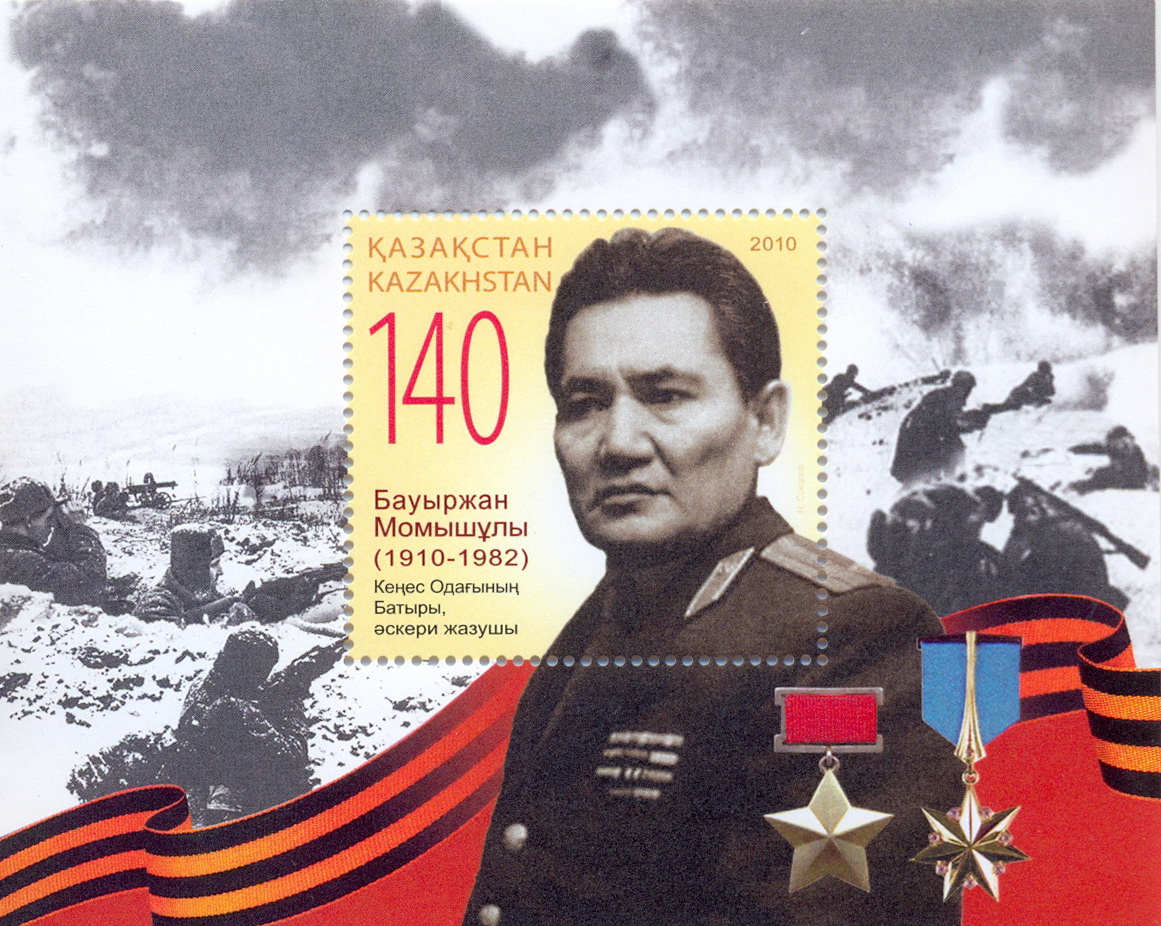
A 2010 Kazakh stamp dedicated to Bauyrzhan

Bauyrzhan's book about the 1941 battles in Volokolamsk, Moscow is Behind Us, was adapted to cinema during 1967. In 1976, he won the Kazakh SSR's Abai Qunanbaiuly State Prize for his autobiography, Our Family.

Bauyrzhan opposed the Brezhnevite establishment's exaltation of the battle of Malaya Zemlya; according to his son and biographer, Bahytzhan, his position made him powerful enemies in the state apparatus, and nullified his chances to receive the title Hero of the Soviet Union while alive. When Isinaliev approached Dinmukhamed Kunaev and requested him to arrange for Bauyrzhan to become one such, the First Secretary replied that as long as General Alexei Yepishev was the head of the Red Army's Main Political Directorate, the decoration would never be bestowed. Bahytzhan also recalled that in his later years, his father – who was a "loosely practicing Muslim" all his life – turned to Sufism. Bauyrzhan died in 1982 and was buried in Alma-Ata.

Shortly before the collapse of the USSR, the chief of the Kazakh Supreme Soviet, Nursultan Nazarbayev, had managed to convince the authorities in Moscow to posthumously grant Bauyrzhan the country's highest military honor, and he was declared a Hero of the Soviet Union on 11 December 1990. After the republic became independent, he was also made a Hero of Kazakhstan. The capital of his native Jualy District, Bauyrzhan Momyshuly, is named after him. The Almaty Zhas Ulan Republican School is also named in his honor.

Today, the Center for Bauyrzhan Studies is located at the Taraz State Pedagogical Institute in Taraz, Kazakhstan. The Center is home to a wide variety of Russian and Kazakh sources on the life and times of Bauyrzhan Momyshuly.

On 26 November 2022, the Military Unit 5571 of the National Guard of Kazakhstan in the center of Almaty was named after Bauyrzhan.

== Notable facts ==
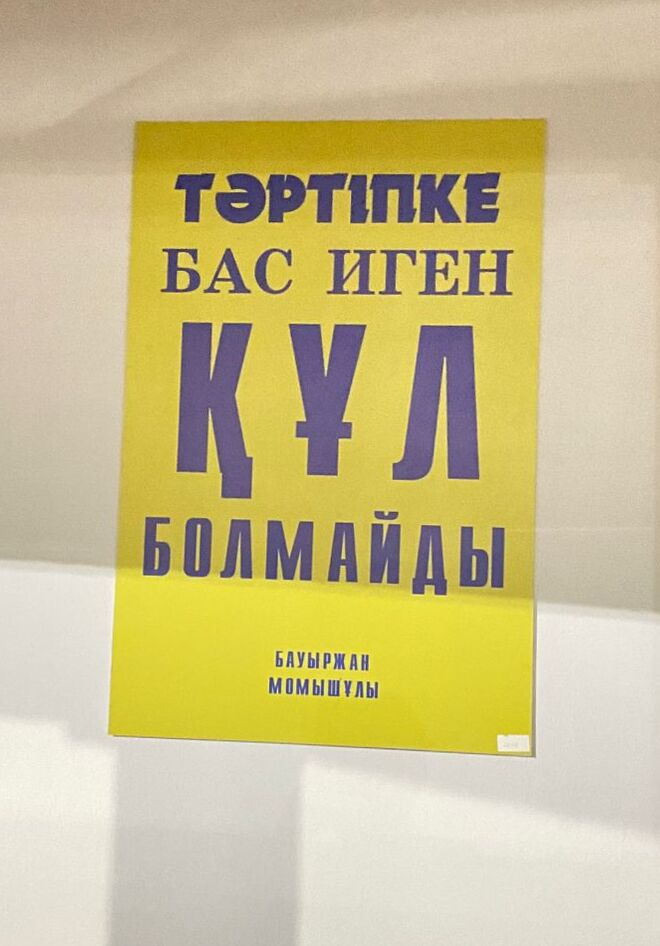
Bauyrzhan's quote "The follower of discipline won't be a slave" in Astana, Kazakhstan

During the Great Patriotic War, among Kazakhs, only Baurzhan Momyshuly commanded a division (in 1945), and Galiy Adilbekov commanded a separate tank brigade (in 1942). According to the Handbook of Commanders of Corps, Divisions, and Naval Bases of the Soviet Armed Forces during the Great Patriotic War 1941–1945, commanders of separate tank brigades are equivalent to division commanders, as tank divisions were reorganized and used as the basis for forming tank brigades during the early stages of the war.

Baurzhan Momyshuly was born to a 53-year-old father, following the births of three sisters.

== Books ==
- Moscow Behind Us ( «За нами Москва»)
- Our General, Ivan Panfilov («Наш генерал»)
- One Night's Tale («История одной ночи»)
- Our Family (Kazakh: «Ұшқан ұя», Russian: «Наша семья»)
- The Officer's Diary («Дневник офицера»)
- Psychology of War: Part 1 («Психология войны: 1 часть»)
- Psychology of War: Part 2 («Психология войны: 2 часть»)
- Meetings in Cuba («Кубинские встречи»)

== Media ==
Bauyrzhan Bauyrzhan has been depicted by the following actors in film and television productions:

- Asanbek Umuraliyev in the 1968 picture Moscow is Behind Us.
- Boris Scherbakov in the 1984 TV mini-series Volokolamsk Highway.

In 2010, Kazakhfilm Studio released the documentary Legendary Bauyrzhan («Қазақтың Бауыржаны»), directed by Kalila Umarov.

In 2013, released TV mini-series named "Bauyrzhan Momyshuly" by famous director of Kazakhstan Akan Satayev.

== See also ==
- List of Kazakh Heroes of the Soviet Union
