= 304th Rifle Division =

- Active: 1941–1945
- Country: Soviet Union
- Branch: Red Army
- Type: Infantry
- Size: Division
- Engagements: Operation Barbarossa; Battle of Kiev; Operation Blue; Operation Uranus; Operation Ring; Taman Peninsula Offensive; Zhitomir–Berdichev Offensive; Lvov–Sandomierz Offensive; Vistula–Oder Offensive; Prague Offensive
- Decorations: Order of the Red Banner (2nd Formation)
- Battle honours: Zhitomir (2nd formation)

Commanders
- Notable commanders: Maj. Gen. Nikolai Pavlovich Pukhov; Col. Serafim Petrovich Merkulov; Col. Mikhail Maksimovich Muzikin

The 304th Rifle Division had its roots in the 109th Mechanized Division, which served before the Great Patriotic War as a mixed armor and infantry formation. Soon after the German invasion it was reorganized as a standard rifle division and renumbered as the 304th. It served in the southwestern part of the Soviet-German front for more than a year and a half, fighting under difficult conditions, including the German summer offensive of 1942. The division did not distinguish itself until Operation Uranus in late 1942 and the subsequent Operation Ring, in which it helped defeat the encircled German Sixth Army. In recognition of these successes, even before the German surrender at Stalingrad, it was raised to Guards status as the 67th Guards Rifle Division. A second 304th was raised six months later, based on a pair of rifle brigades, facing the German 17th Army in the Kuban. After helping to liberate this region the division continued in combat through Ukraine and Poland, winning its own distinctions at Zhitomir and an Order of the Red Banner, before ending the war near Prague.

== 1st Formation ==
After losing most of its trucks and tanks in its first battles near Kiev, the 109th Mechanized Division of 5th Mechanized Corps began moving back to Zolotonosha, east of the Dniepr River, to reform as the 304th Rifle Division on July 12, 1941. Its order of battle was revised to the following:

- 807th Rifle Regiment - newly formed from reserves and added to replace the 16th Tank Regiment
- 809th Rifle Regiment - from 381st Motorized Rifle Regiment
- 812th Rifle Regiment - from 602nd Motorized Rifle Regiment
- 560th Artillery Regiment - from 404th Motorized Artillery Regiment
- 378th Antitank Battalion
- 602nd Sapper Battalion
- 635th Signal Battalion
- 318th Reconnaissance Company

The first commander of the new division was Col. Timofei Ilich Sidorenko, but he was replaced after about six weeks by Maj. Gen. Nikolai Pavlovich Pukhov.

After several weeks in Southwestern Front reserves, the 304th was assigned to the 38th Army in early August, just as that Army was itself forming up. The division remained in that Army until July, 1942. It was able to avoid encirclement near Kiev as it was located just east of the point where 1st Panzer Group broke through the Soviet front, and was able to retreat through Poltava. In late January, 1942, Maj. Gen. Pukhov was reassigned to command of 13th Army, and was replaced by Col. Ivan Vasilievich Khazov. The division also managed to stay clear of the debacle at Kharkov in May, 1942.

In early June the 304th was facing the difficult task of helping to defend the sector from the Northern Donets River east of Chuguev southwards 60 km to the west of Izium; the division itself was holding the area near Balakleia. As a preliminary to its summer offensive, on June 22 German Army Group South launched Operation Fridericus II to gain control of Izium and Kupiansk, and also to encircle and destroy as much as possible of the Soviet 38th and 9th Armies. The German advance on the latter city was held up by a strenuous defense by 9th Guards Rifle Division, which allowed the 304th and three other divisions to escape encirclement and join 38th Army's new line behind the Oskol without serious losses. It was in these positions when Operation Blue began.

=== Operation Blue ===
38th Army was directly in the path when the second phase of this offensive began on July 7, and by the 9th was in deep trouble. Maj. Gen. Kirill Moskalenko, the Army's commander, sent urgent messages to the STAVKA requesting permission to withdraw well east of the Aidar River to prevent his forces being entirely cut off. When no reply was forthcoming, he ordered the retreat on his own authority. While the 304th suffered significant casualties in this retreat, and German intelligence counted it as one of the divisions that had been "bagged", Moskalenko's order saved enough to allow it to be rebuilt.

On July 31, Col. Serafim Petrovich Merkulov took command of the division, and would hold it for the remainder of the 1st Formation's existence. Shortly before this the 304th was moved to the 21st Army, under the newly formed Stalingrad Front. In August, as the defense of Stalingrad was being planned, the division was assigned to hold part of its Army's 140 km-wide sector from the mouth of the Khoper River as far as Melo-Kletsky.

In mid-August, after German 6th Army had cleared the great bend of the Don River and was clearly preparing for an advance on Stalingrad, Col. Gen. Andrey Yeryomenko conceived a plan to distract the German forces from this objective. On August 19 he issued an attack order to 21st and 63rd Armies to cross the Don southwards in the 30 km sector west of Serafimovich. Most of this sector had been taken up by elements of the Italian 8th Army within the past week, although they still had some backup from the Germans. The 304th, along with the 96th Rifle Division, were to play 21st Army's part in this offensive, attacking on a 15 km sector from Serafimovich to the Khoper. In the event, the 96th had no success against the German forces in Serafimovich itself in the early going, but the 304th managed to establish a small bridgehead, and over the following days pushed forwards 7 km and began digging in on August 27, while the 96th liberated Serafimovich. The gains made by 63rd Army were more extensive, and together these created one of the bridgeheads across the Don which would play an important role in Operation Uranus. The division, in company with the 124th Rifle Division, launched a heavy diversionary attack against the 79th Infantry Division on September 4 with the objective of tying down German forces in the region.

=== Operation Uranus ===
In October the division was reassigned to 65th Army in Don Front as that Army was being organized. In Maj. Gen. P.I. Batov's plan for the offensive in November, the 304th formed half of the Army's shock group, alongside the 27th Guards Rifle Division, on a 6 km-wide sector on the south bank of the Don between Kletskaia and Melo-Kletskii. This bridgehead had been won from the Germans by the 1st Guards Army in August. The attack began on the morning of November 19 with a massive artillery barrage. Between 0848 and 0850 hrs. Moscow time, riflemen and sappers of the leading battalions, bolstered by 49 tanks of the 91st Tank Brigade, commenced the assault, aimed at the boundary between 1st Romanian Cavalry and the German 376th Infantry Divisions. The immediate objective was to smash the Romanian cavalry, then attack southeastward to turn the flank of 6th Army's XI Corps and protect the left flank of 21st Army's mobile group as it exploited southwards. General Batov recorded:

"The first two trench lines on the high ground on the [southern] bank were taken immediately. Fighting then developed on the nearby heights... The guardsmen [27th Guards] on the right, which were pressed up against the neighboring 76th Division, advanced well. In the center it was worse: Merkulov [304th Rifle Division] was forced to the ground in front of Melo-Kletskaia."

The 304th had encountered skillfully fortified strongpoints manned by German troops that they could not overcome. Further, they faced nearly constant counterattacks from 376th Infantry, supported later in the day by elements of 14th Panzer Division.

One of these strongpoints was the village of Orekhovsky, which was attacked repeatedly through the day with tank support with only minimal success. However, a single battalion of the 807th Rifle Regiment, commanded by Major Chebotaev, managed to capture Marker 202.2 on the high ground just 2 km west of the village's center. Overnight, Batov and his staff worked out a new plan to exploit this limited success. A mobile group was formed, made up of about 45 T-34 and KV tanks from 91st Brigade, with submachine gunners riding on their decks, accompanied by motorized infantry and artillery. This force came under the command of Col. G.I. Anisimov on the morning of November 20 and was ready to advance in the early afternoon, following the rifle forces that were developing the 807th Regiment's penetration. Diversionary attacks were made by 65th Army's left-flank forces, while the 304th continued its assault on Orekhovsky and another strongpoint at Logovsky. This would be assisted by the fresh 252nd Rifle Division entering the battle at the boundary between the 304th and the 27th Guards. During the morning these two divisions pushed deeply into the Romanian defenses, after which the 252nd created a breach which Anisimov's mobile group entered and began its exploitation, advancing 23 km into XI Corps' left rear by nightfall, sowing panic and helping convince the German Corps that its position was becoming untenable. Meanwhile, the three rifle divisions advanced 2 to 4 km to the southeast, and on the following day completed the liberation of Orekhovsky, as well as Logovsky and Osinki.

On November 21 the advance of the division and its neighbors became more difficult as the 376th Infantry consolidated its positions and was gradually reinforced. Despite the slow progress on this sector, over the next two days Southwestern and Stalingrad Fronts completed the encirclement of German 6th Army, and the mission of Don Front changed to that of liquidating the enemy pocket. 65th Army resumed its advance early on November 25. XI Corps, reinforced with elements of XIV Panzer Corps, began to pull back southeast across the Don, giving up its bridgehead in the Great Bend, which was untenable. Batov began a slow pursuit with his 24th, 304th and 252nd Rifle Divisions; the 304th advanced from Rodionov to Kubantseva Balka, with the support of 91st Tank Brigade. By the end of the day the area of the German bridgehead had been reduced by roughly half. The next day the pursuit continued, and the division reached the northern slope of Hill 204.0, 2 km south of Biriuchkov, before being stopped by heavy fire from the hill. Overnight on November 26/27 the last German forces were withdrawn. Batov wrote:

"The 304th Rifle Division's... forward detachments rushed up to the crossings at Petrovatka and, during the day on 27 November, the division's main forces captured Luchenskii, and the forward units on the eastern bank abruptly turned toward the northeast and joined battle on the approaches to Vertiachii. The shock group of 65th Army (with its regimental artillery) was already on that side of the Don."

This shock group was led by two battalions of the 812th Rifle Regiment, which made a night crossing of the ice-covered river under protective fire from 91st Tank Brigade. It was a risky move because the ice was not as firm as Batov would have liked, but with the help of the 14th Engineer Brigade the rest of the 304th made it across safely, and the sappers soon erected a bridge. Within 24 hours Vertiachii was taken, as the German forces continued to withdraw to the defensive line designated by 6th Army command several days earlier. Batov then withdrew the division into 65th Army's reserves.

=== Operation Ring ===
The 304th re-entered the battle at 0700 hrs. on December 2. A reconnaissance group of 27th Guards had found a small gap in the German lines the day before, and the two divisions were tasked to exploit it. The attack, supported by 12 tanks plus antitank guns of the 52nd Tank Destroyer Regiment, against the German 131st Regiment of 44th Infantry Division defending Hill 124.5 (Chernyi Kurgan), advanced several hundred metres after a full day of intense fighting, but fell short of taking the hill. 24th Rifle Division took the lead in a further attack on December 4. The 304th was to support and protect its right flank as it drove on Hill 113.6 and the village of Baburkin, 3 km beyond. Despite significant artillery support the assault made only limited gains. Chernyi Kurgan was taken, and would be a thorn in the side of 44th Division through the coming weeks, but nearly all other gains were erased by German counterattacks. On December 6, in an effort to restore its main battle line, German VIII Army Corps launched several counterattacks against the hill, which 24th Division had turned into a virtual fortress, as well as the Golaia ravine, defended by the 27th Guards and 304th. In fighting that went on into December 8, these gains were held.

Through most of the rest of the month the lines surrounding 6th Army became relatively quiet as the Soviet Fronts prepared for Operation Ring. One exception to this pattern occurred on December 28/29, when five divisions of 21st and 65th Armies, including the 304th, launched assault groups against the much-reduced 44th and 376th Infantry Divisions. The former lost 177 men over the two days, while the latter lost 130 men on the 28th and 392 in counterattacks the following day.

When Ring formally began on January 10, 1943, the division was one of ten in the first echelon of 21st, 65th and 24th Armies that would make Don Front's main attack, facing 44th Infantry and 29th Motorized Divisions. The 304th and 173rd Rifle Divisions, on the right wing of 65th Army, had a long-range artillery group of three army-level regiments, firing in their direct support. After a 55-minute opening barrage the infantry assault began at 0900 hrs., supported by over 100 tanks, and soon overwhelmed the enemy defenses. The 304th and 24th Divisions, led by the KV tanks of the 5th and 14th Guards Tank Regiments, overran the three weak battalions of 44th Infantry's 134th and 132nd Regiments, plus the battalion-sized Group Weller of 29th Motorized along a 4 km-wide sector. The two Soviet divisions advanced 2 km, shattered all four enemy battalions, and opened a 2 km-wide breach of the German line by day's end.

On January 11, Batov exploited this gap by ordering his 23rd Rifle Division straight into it from second echelon and over that day it advanced, along with the 304th, about 3 km, reaching to within 1 km of the Rossoshka valley and, in the process, rendering VIII Corps' defenses west of the Rossoshka completely untenable. In the course of the next day's fighting the division managed to win a 1- to 2 km- wide bridgehead across this river. On the 13th, the 304th, with two other divisions, continued to attack the remaining defenses of 44th Infantry, but made limited gains. The next day the division, in concert with the 23rd, enveloped the 44th's forces defending Novo-Alekseevsky but failed to capture the town; they were later reinforced by 273rd Rifle Division. From January 15 to 17 the pace of the Soviet advance slowed, and Rokossovsky finally called a halt for rest and replenishment.

Before the offensive was officially set to resume, on January 21 65th Army went back to the attack with four divisions, including the 304th, backed again by 91st Tank Brigade, striking eastward, and penetrating the defenses of VIII Corps' 76th Infantry Division. These attacks finished off the 44th Infantry and did severe damage to the 76th, and also created a 6 km-wide gap in 6th Army's western front, bringing divisional artillery within range of Gumrak airfield. In recognition of the accomplishments of the division, late in the day the 304th Rifle Division was re-designated as the 67th Guards Rifle Division.

== 2nd Formation ==
The second 304th Rifle Division was formed from the 43rd Rifle Brigade and the 256th Rifle Brigade of 9th Rifle Corps, on August 1, 1943, in 9th Army in the North Caucasus Front.

=== 43rd Rifle Brigade ===
The second formation of this brigade took place in August, 1942, in the reserves of Transcaucasus Front by mobilizing training units in the Transcaucasus Military District. Early in October it was assigned to the 58th Army in the Northern Group of its Front. 58th Army was acting as a reserve backing the Terek River line, blocking the German advance on Baku and the Caspian oil fields. At the end of the month the 43rd advanced into the 9th Rifle Corps' positions in 44th Army along the Terek. On November 22, the brigade consisted of:

- 4 rifle battalions, each 700-800 men, plus:
  - 1 AT rifle section (2 AT rifles)
  - 1 machine gun company
  - 1 mortar company (6 82mm mortars)
  - 1 AT rifle platoon (6 AT rifles)
- 1 mortar battalion (24 82mm mortars)
- 1 submachine gun company (100-120 men)
- 1 "assault troop" (100-120 men)

The lack of artillery and other heavy weapons was typical of the units formed in the region during the crisis of July to September. As the front began to move north and west towards the Kuban the brigade was reassigned to 9th Army in the North Caucasus Front and served there facing the German 17th Army from February to July, 1943, until it was disbanded.

=== 256th Rifle Brigade ===
This brigade was formed in February - March, 1942, in the Moscow Military District. It was in the Moscow Defense Zone from April to August, when it was railed south to the Transcaucasus Military District. When it arrived it consisted of:

- 4 rifle battalions, each:
  - 3 rifle companies (123 men each)
  - 1 submachine gun company (100 men)
  - 1 machine gun company
  - 1 mortar company (82mm mortars)
  - AT rifle, sapper supply platoons
- 1 artillery battalion (20 76mm and 45mm cannon)
- 1 antitank battalion (346 men)
  - 3 companies (108 antitank rifles total)
- 1 sapper company (120 men)
- 1 reconnaissance platoon

The brigade was commanded by Col. V.S. Antonov. It was quickly assigned to 44th Army, then in September to 9th Army along the Terek River defense line. In November, during the last gasps of the German offensive, the 256th became part of 9th Rifle Corps back in 44th Army, and remained there while the enemy retreat began. In January, 1943, that Corps moved to 9th Army in North Caucasus Front, and the brigade served the next six months facing the German positions on the Taman Peninsula until it was disbanded.

The order of battle of the new 304th Rifle Division remained as previous. The first commander assigned was Col. Timofeiy Ustinovich Grinchenko. After just over one month of forming up, the division was assigned to the 11th Rifle Corps of 9th Army.

== Advance ==
On September 19 the 304th began operations in the Taman as part of the final offensive to drive German forces from their last foothold in the Kuban. It formed part of a strike group attacking the village of Kurchanskaya, which was taken. On the 25th, in concert with the 316th Rifle Division and following a powerful artillery and air attack, it stormed the city of Temryuk, which was taken two days later after heavy street fighting. The surviving Germans fled to the village of Golubitskaya; the 304th, crossing the Kuban River using improvised means, pursued. On October 9 the entire peninsula was cleared of Axis troops. Two weeks later Colonel Grinchenko was replaced in command by Col. Mikhail Maksimovich Muzikin.

In November, 9th Army was disbanded, and its forces were redeployed to other Fronts and Armies. 11th Rifle Corps was railed northwestward, joining 38th Army in 1st Ukrainian Front west of Kiev in December. The 304th would remain in this Front until the last few weeks of the war. During the Zhitomir–Berdichev Offensive, the division played an important role in the second liberation of Zhitomir on the last day of 1943, and was awarded the name of that city as an honorific:

"ZHITOMIR - ...304th Rifle Division (Colonel Muzikin, Mikhail Maksimovich)... By order of the Supreme High Command of 1 January 1944, and a commendation in Moscow, the troops who participated in the battles for the liberation of Zhitomir are given a salute of 20 artillery salvoes from 224 guns."

At this time the division was in the 6th Guards Rifle Corps of 1st Guards Army.

On March 29, 1944, Col. Ivan Mikhailovich Boldanov took command from Colonel Muzikin, but was in turn replaced by Col. Aleksandr Stepanovich Galtzev on June 3. On April 3, the division was recognized for its role in the liberation of Kamianets-Podilskyi and several other towns with the Order of the Red Banner. On July 21 the 304th was shifted to 52nd Rifle Corps, back in 38th Army, and then in October to 106th Rifle Corps of 60th Army. The division remained in that Corps and that Army for the duration. In a final change of command on February 7, 1945, Colonel Galtzev handed over to Col. Khaiyrbek Demirbekovich Zamanov. In the last weeks of the war the 60th Army was transferred to 4th Ukrainian Front, and the 304th ended hostilities in the vicinity of Prague. The division ended the war with the official name: 304th Rifle, Zhitomir, Order of the Red Banner Division. (Russian: 304-я стрелковая Житомирская Краснознамённая дивизия.)

The division was disbanded "in place" during the summer of 1945 with the Northern Group of Forces.

== See also ==
- Charge of the Savoia Cavalleria at Izbushensky (August 1942)
