= Baktybek Bekbolotov =

Kyrgyz lieutenant general

- Бактыбек Бекболотов
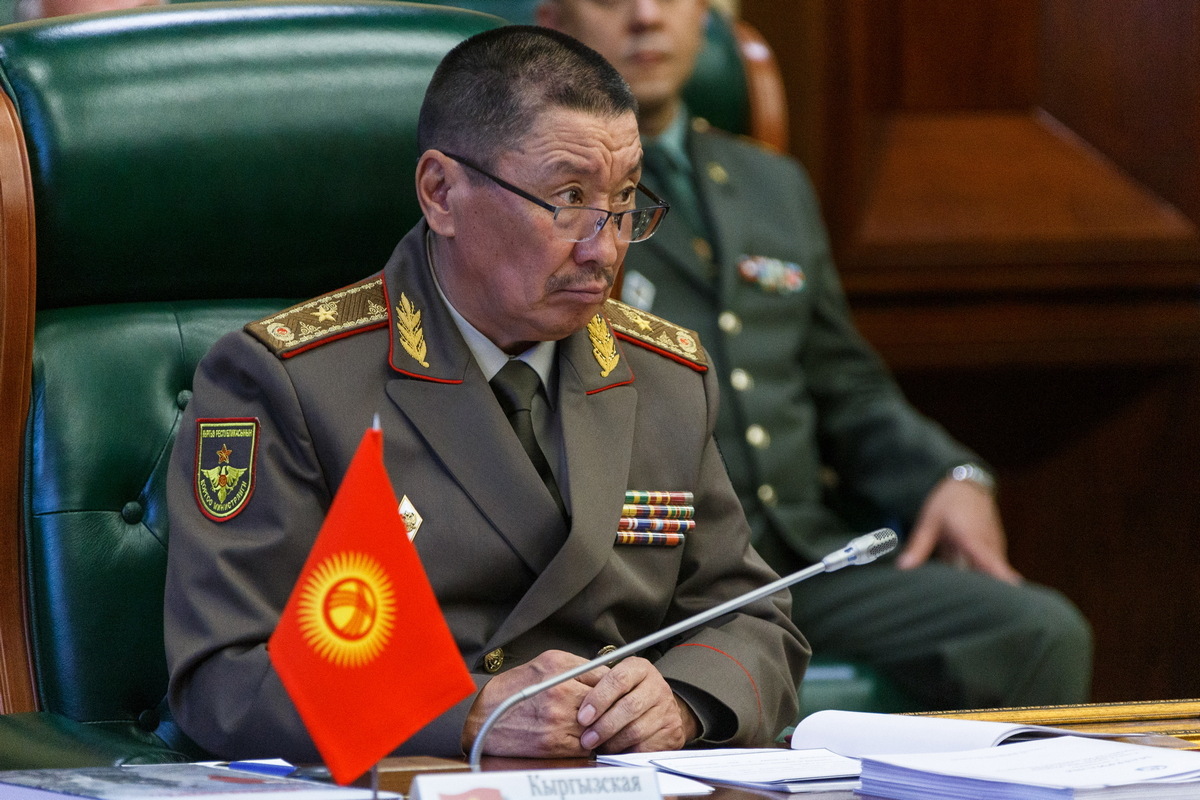
- Bekbolotov in 2021

Secretary of the Security Council of Kyrgyzstan
- In office 15 May 2025 – 1 December 2025
- President: Sadyr Japarov
- Preceded by: Marat Imankulov
- Succeeded by: Marat Imankulov

Minister of Defense
- In office 6 September 2021 – 15 May 2025
- President: Sadyr Japarov
- Preceded by: Taalaibek Omuraliev
- Succeeded by: Ruslan Mukambetov

Personal details
- Born: 15 October 1964 (age 61) Tyup, Kirghiz SSR, Soviet Union (now Kyrgyzstan)

Baktybek Asankaliyevich Bekbolotov (Kyrgyz: Бактыбек Асанкалы уулу Бекболотов; born 15 October 1964) is a Kyrgyz lieutenant general who was the Secretary of the Security Council of Kyrgyzstan from 15 May 2025 to 1 December 2025.

== Biography ==
Baktybek Bekbolotov was born in the village of Tyup, Issyk-Kul Region on 15 October 1964. He is a member of the Kyrgyz tribe Bugu. From 1983 to 1985, he served in the Central Asian Military District. In 1989, he graduated from the Leningrad Higher Artillery Command School.

He served in the military from 1989 to 1992 in the Western Group of Forces as an artillery platoon and battery commander. From 1992 to 1999, he served as commander of an artillery battery, chief of staff, commander of a division, chief of artillery, commander of an artillery regiment and military commandant of the garrison of the Armed Forces of Kyrgyzstan.

From 1999 to 2001, he studied at the Mikhailovskaya Military Artillery Academy in Saint Petersburg. From 2001 to 2007, he was the head of the artillery unit and the commander of a separate unit, and from 2007 to 2008, he was the head of the operational department.

He served as First Deputy Commander - Chief of Staff of the National Guard - from July 24, 2008 to November 13, 2009. He headed the Military Institute of the Armed Forces of Kyrgyzstan from 2012 to 2014.

From 2014 to 2015, he completed a full course of study at the Academy of the General Staff of the Armed Forces of Russia, after which he was appointed commander of the 8th Guards Motorized Rifle Division named after Hero of the Soviet Union, Major General Ivan Panfilov. In 2017, he was appointed Chief of Staff - First Deputy Commander of the Ground Forces of Kyrgyzstan, and then later retired from the army. He served as Chairman of the Board of JSC "Bishkek Machine-Building Plant".

On 6 September 2021, by presidential decree, Bekbolotov was appointed Minister of Defense of Kyrgyzstan, replacing Taalaibek Omuraliev. At the time of his appointment, he had the rank of colonel to major general and was promoted on 7 September. Together with other members of the Cabinet of Ministers, he received a vote of confidence from the Parliament (Zhogorku Kenesh) on 13 October and took the oath on the same day.

The press associated the appointment of Bekbolotov with the growing tension in the region caused by the seizure of power by the Taliban in Afghanistan.
