= 78th Rifle Division =

Infantry division of the Red Army

The 78th Rifle Division (Russian: 78-я стрелковая дивизия, romanized: 78-ya strelkovaya diviziya) was an infantry division of the Red Army, formed in 1932, in Novosibirsk, in the Siberian Military District. After being used to provide cadres for new divisions, in September 1939 the division was reformed for the second time. In 1940 the division was transferred to Khabarovsk in the Far Eastern Front.

At the Battle of Moscow it fought alongside the 316th Rifle Division, and its commander Ivan Panfilov, in November 1941. For its distinguished service, the division was awarded Guards status and renamed as the 9th Guards Rifle Division on November 26, 1941.

== Second wartime formation ==
Colonel Nikolay Matveyevich Mikhailov (promoted to major general on 17 November 1943) became division commander of the 403rd Rifle Division at Samarkand in March 1942. Between 24 April and 17 May the 403rd was relocated to the settlement of Pesochnoye, Yaroslavl Oblast, in the Moscow Military District, where it was disbanded. The personnel from the 403rd were sent to the 78th Rifle Division, forming at Kostroma, and Mikhailov became commander of the latter. The 78th was sent to the Kalinin Front in July and assigned to the 30th Army. The division entered combat on 30 July near Rzhev and the village of Khanino. In its first three days of combat, the 78th lost as many as half of its personnel. Subsequently, elements of the division defended the approaches to Rzhev, as part of the 30th, 49th, and 5th Armies; the 5th Army transferred to the Western Front on 31 August.

The division was withdrawn for rebuilding in December, then sent to the Southwestern Front where it fought in the Voroshilovgrad Offensive with the 1st Guards Army. From late February to 29 August, as part of the 3rd Guards Army, it defended positions on the left bank of the Seversky Donets in the area of Privolnoye. The division approached the main defensive line at Zaporozhye on 20 September and in October, as part of the 33rd Rifle Corps of the 8th Guards Army, fought in the Zaporizhia Offensive. For its actions in the capture of Zaporozhye, the 78th received the city name as an honorific on 14 October. With its corps, the division went into the army reserve between 16 October and 2 November. Elements of the 78th participated in fierce fighting on the right bank of the Dnieper near Fyodorovka, providing a crossing for the troops of the 3rd Ukrainian Front, between 4 and 7 November, before being withdrawn to front reserve.

The division became part of the 35th Guards Rifle Corps in January 1944, successively serving with the 5th and 7th Guards and 27th Armies in the Kirovograd and the Uman–Botoșani Offensives. It transferred to the 33rd Rifle Corps in March. It went on to participate in the Second Jassy–Kishinev, Debrecen, and Budapest Offensives with the 27th Army during the remainder of the year. For its "courage and valor" displayed during the capture of Ploiești during the Second Jassy–Kishinev Offensive, the division was awarded the Order of Suvorov, 2nd class, on 15 September. During the Budapest Offensive, elements of the division captured Miskolc on 3 December. For its "courage and valor" in this action, the 78th received the Order of the Red Banner on 16 December.

From 21 February, the 78th, with the 35th Guards Rifle Corps of the 27th Army of the 3rd Ukrainian Front, fought in the Balaton Defensive Operation and the Vienna Offensive. After capturing Fürstenberg, south of Vienna, on 16 April, Mikhailov came under German machine gun fire while conducting a reconnaissance and was severely wounded. He was evacuated and spent more than a year hospitalized, being made a Hero of the Soviet Union on 28 April. Mikhailov was replaced on 17 April by Tatar Colonel Garif Volodkin, who commanded the division for the rest of the war.

At the end of the war, the division was subordinated to the 3rd Ukrainian Front, within the 27th Army. The division was withdrawn with the 33rd Rifle Corps to the Carpathian Military District as part of the 38th Army after 27th Army disbanded. The division was based at Starokonstantinov. It was disbanded with the corps by May 1946.

== Postwar ==
According to Crofoot's Armies of the Bear, the 78th Rifle Division was once again formed, for the fourth time, in 1955 and was subordinated to the Volga-Ural Military District, being reorganized in 1957 into the 78th Motor Rifle Division (later motor rifle training division) which stayed at Chebarkul until it became the 471 DTC in 1987 and the 5355th Weapons and Equipment Storage Base in October 1989. Later on (1990 or 1992), briefly, the 167th Motor Rifle Brigade was formed at Chebarkul also, but later disbanded, possibly after helping to collect troops to form the 205th Motor Rifle Brigade in the North Caucasus. It may have folded into the 5355th Base. The base was disbanded in 1994.

Later the 15th Guards Tank Division 'Mozyr' was withdrawn from the Central Group of Forces and relocated to Chebarkul.

== Structure during 1941 ==
- 40th Rifle Regiment (formerly the 232nd Rifle Regiment)
- 131st Rifle Regiment (formerly the 233rd Rifle Regiment)
- 258th Rifle Regiment (formerly the 234th Rifle Regiment)
- 71st Light Artillery Regiment (renamed the 159th Light Artillery Regiment on 5 November 1939)
- 210th Howitzer Artillery Regiment
- 139th Independent Anti-Tank Artillery Battalion
- 435th Independent Anti-Aircraft Artillery Battalion
- 60th Reconnaissance Battalion
- 89th Sapper Battalion
- 110th Independent Signals Battalion
- 104th Medical-Sanitation Battalion
- 70th Auto-Transport Battalion (reorganized into the 168th Auto-Transport Company)
- 25th Mobile Field Bakery
- 485th Field Postal Station
- 451st Field Cash Office of the State Bank

== External links and sources ==
- 78th Rifle Division Order of Battle.
- Feskov et al., The Soviet Army during the Period of the Cold War, Tomsk University Press, Tomsk, 2004
