= Almaty Zhas Ulan Republican School =

Kazakhstan military academy

- Type: boarding school
- Established: 28 February 1983; 43 years ago
- Affiliations: Armed Forces of the Republic of Kazakhstan
- Location: Almaty, Almaty Region, Kazakhstan
- Language: Kazakh, Russian
- Colors: Light Blue

The Zhas Ulan Republican School named after Baurzhan Momyshuly (Kazakh: Бауыржан Момышұлы атындағы Жас ұлан республикалық мектебі, Bawırjan Momışulı atındağı Jas ulan respublikalıq mektebi; Russian: Республиканская школа Жаса Улана имени Бауржана Момышулы) also known as the Almaty Zhas Ulan Republican School is a military boarding school in Kazakhstan's Armed Forces which specializes in the training of Kazakh youth who want to join the military.

== History ==
The school was opened on February 28, 1983, on the basis of a decree of the Council of Ministers of the Kazakh SSR. It was known originally as the Almaty Republican School with in-depth study of the Russian language and enhanced military physical training. In 1991, following the fall of the USSR, the name was changed in order to honour Kazakh Hero of the Soviet Union Bauyrzhan Momyshuly. The standard curriculum was approved by the Minister of Education and Science in 2013. In 2015, it was transferred to the Ministry of Defense and renamed in accordance with a government resolution to its current name. The current charter of the school was approved by order of the Minister of Defense Imangali Tasmagambetov on 17 November of that year.

== School overview ==
It is named after Kazakh-Soviet Hero of the Soviet Union and People's Hero of Kazakhstan, Colonel Bauyrzhan Momyshuly. The words "the day when Bauke received the Star can be considered the day when the Star of the people rose" are carved on the pedestal to Momyshuly installed on the territory of the school. Teachers from the school took part in the International Scientific and Practical Conference at the Boarding School for Girls of the Ministry of Defense of Russia.

=== Educational system ===
The educational and material base of the school includes an educational building, consisting of one 2-storey building with 25 classrooms, of which:

- 20 classrooms of general education disciplines
- 1 class of basic military training
- 2 language labs

== See also ==
- Armed Forces of the Republic of Kazakhstan
- Military Institute of the Kazakh Ground Forces
- Astana Zhas Ulan Republican School
