= Panfilov Park (Bishkek) =

Park in Bishkek, Kyrgyzstan

Panfilov Park Russian: Парк Панфилова
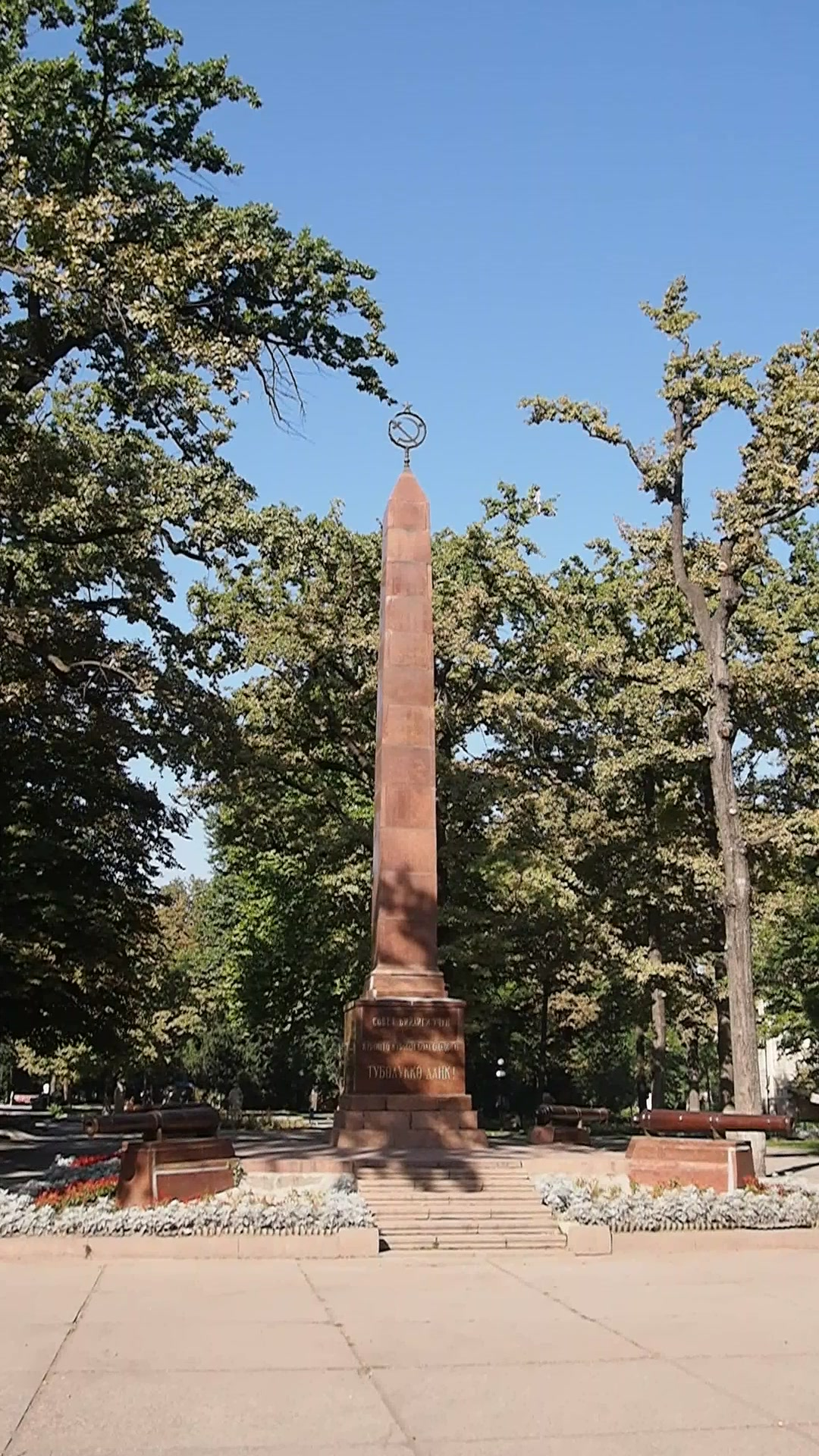
- Panfilov Park in the daytime
- Interactive map of Panfilov Park; Russian: Парк Панфилова
- Type: Memorial
- Location: Bishkek, Kyrgyzstan
- Coordinates: 42°52′47″N 74°36′01″E
- Created: 1940
- Status: All year

Panfilov Park (Kyrgyz: Панфилов паркы, romanized: Panfilov parkı; Russian: Парк Панфилова) is an urban park located near Old Square and Manas Square in Bishkek, the capital of the Kyrgyz Republic. The park bears the name of Hero of the Soviet Union, and the chairman of the Military Committee of the Kirghiz SSR, Ivan Panfilov. The park was made in the shape of a star when it was built.

== History ==
It was founded in 1924 as Zvezda park. In 1942 it was named after Ivan Panfilov. In the same year reconstructed in connection with the establishment of Panfilov IV. monument. In the park is a monument to Ivan Panfilov, which was opened in 1944 and was the first monument in the USSR established to commemorate this Panfilov's service.

On the 80th anniversary of the 8th Guards Motor Rifle Division in 2021, Kyrgyz servicemen of the division marched to Panfilov Park for the anniversary ceremony.
