= Volokolamsk =

Town in Moscow Oblast, Russia

Volokolamsk Волоколамск
- Town
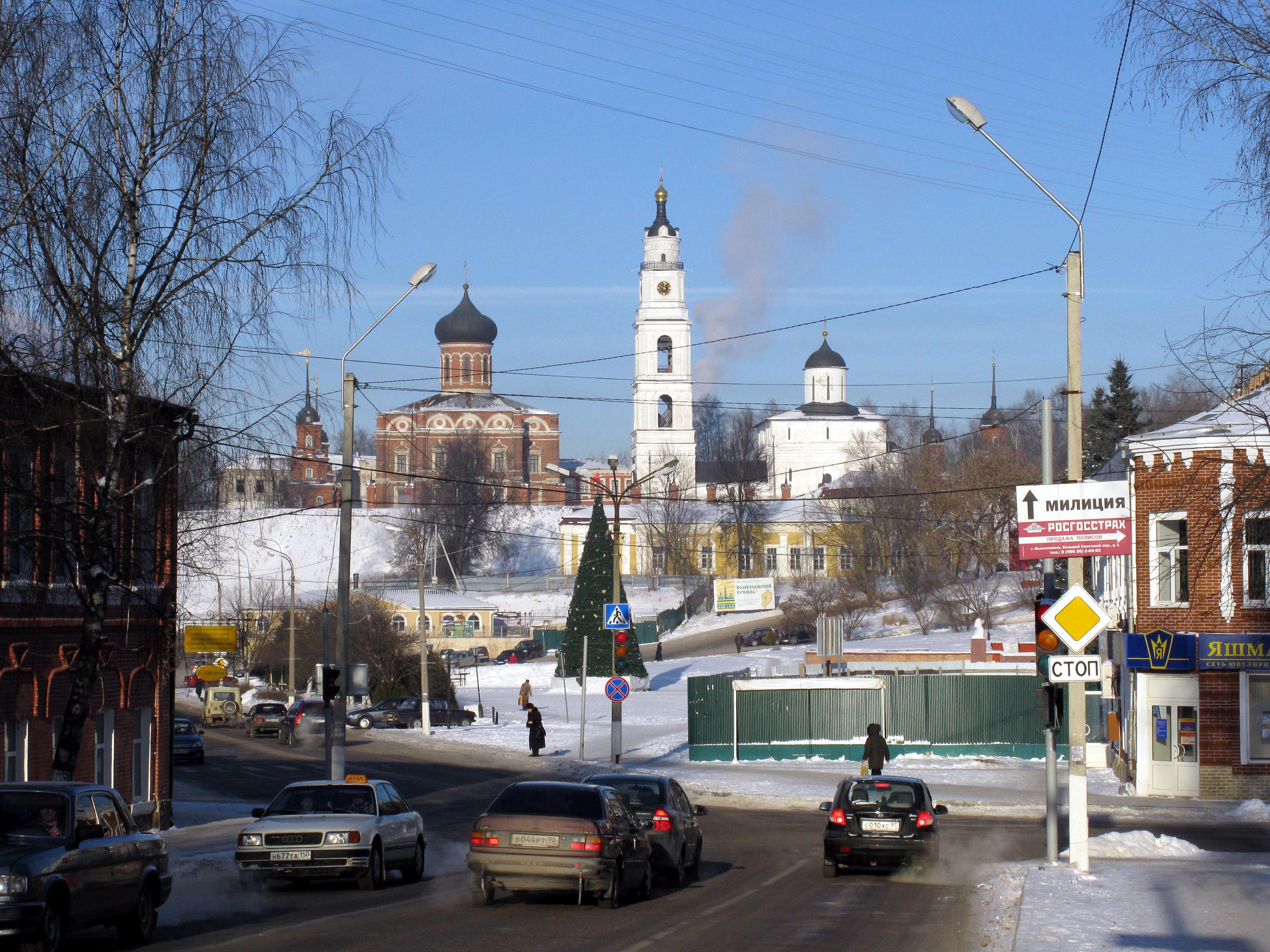
- View of Volokolamsk Kremlin

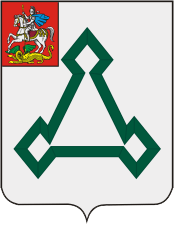
- Flag Coat of arms
- Interactive map of Volokolamsk
- Location of Volokolamsk Volokolamsk (Moscow Oblast)
- Coordinates: 56°02′N 35°57′E
- Country: Russia
- Federal subject: Moscow Oblast
- Administrative district: Volokolamsky District
- TownSelsoviet: Volokolamsk
- First mentioned: 1135
- Elevation: 170 m (560 ft)

Population (2010 Census)
  - Total: 23,433
  - Estimate (2025): 25,394 (+8.4%)

Administrative status
  - Capital of: Volokolamsky District, Town of Volokolamsk

Municipal status
  - Municipal district: Volokolamsky Municipal District
  - Urban settlement: Volokolamsk Urban Settlement
  - Capital of: Volokolamsky Municipal District, Volokolamsk Urban Settlement
- Time zone: UTC+3 (MSK)
- Postal codes: 143600, 143602–143604, 143608
- Dialing code: +7 49636
- OKTMO ID: 46508000001

Volokolamsk (Russian: Волокола́мск) is a town and the administrative center of Volokolamsky District in Moscow Oblast, Russia, located on the Gorodenka River, not far from its confluence with the Lama River, 129 kilometers (80 mi) northwest of Moscow. Population: 25,729 (2024 Estimate); 26,398 (2021 census); 23,433 (2010 census); 16,656 (2002 census); 18,226 (1989 Soviet census).

== History ==
It was first mentioned in the Voskresensk Chronicle under the year 1135. It was built by Novgorodian merchants on a 5-kilometer (3.1 mi) portage (Russian: Волок/Volok) on a waterway from Novgorod to Moscow and Ryazan, hence the name "Volokolamsk" (i.e., "Volok on the Lama"). In 1178, the town was burned by Vsevolod the Big Nest, who added it to Vladimir-Suzdal lands. His son Yaroslav II restored it to Novgorod in 1231. After the Mongol invasion of Rus', the town was divided into two parts: one assigned to Novgorod and another one to the Grand Dukes of Vladimir. The Principality of Tver failed to take it in 1273.

Ivan Kalita presented his part of the town to the boyar Rodion Nestorovich, who presently wrested the other part from Novgorod. In 1345, Simeon the Proud gave Volokolamsk to his father-in-law, one of Smolensk princes. While in possession of Smolensk, the town withstood a siege by Algirdas during the Lithuanian–Muscovite War (1368–72). Vladimir the Bold defeated Tokhtamysh near Volokolamsk in 1383. Soon thereafter, it reverted to Novgorod. The town remained the southernmost enclave of the Novgorod Republic until 1398, when Vasily I definitively incorporated it into the Grand Duchy of Moscow. Ten years later, it was granted for two years to Švitrigaila, who had just defected to Moscow. Having lost its Hanseatic trade and connections with Novgorod, the town declined and was not mentioned by any sources for the next half a century. It was in 1462, when Volokolamsk was given by Ivan III to his younger brother, that the town became the seat of a full-scale appanage principality. Its first prince erected the single-domed limestone Resurrection Cathedral, which still stands. Another prince was Andrey Volotsky; the chief monument from his reign is the three-domed cathedral of the Vyazmischi Cloister (1535).

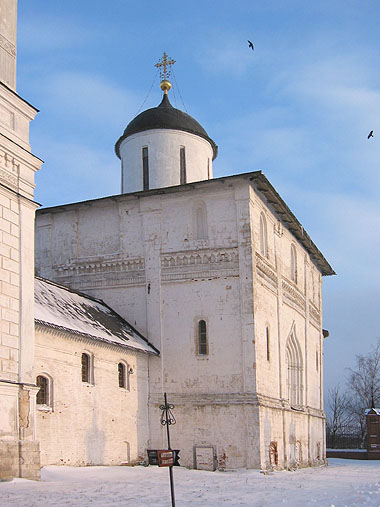
The Resurrection Cathedral, built during the 1460s, is one of the last limestone cathedrals in Russia

In 1613, Volokolamsk braved a siege by Sigismund III Vasa, an event which led to the town's fortifications being represented on its coat of arms. By that time, Volokolamsk had been associated primarily with the Joseph-Volokolamsk Monastery, situated 17 kilometers (11 mi) to the northeast.

The Soviet authority in Volokolamsk was established in late October 1917. During World War II, a number of violent clashes between the German and Soviet troops and partisans took place near Volokolamsk. The town was under German occupation from 27 October to 20 December 1941, when it was liberated by the 331st Rifle Division.

== Administrative and municipal status ==
Within the framework of administrative divisions, Volokolamsk serves as the administrative center of Volokolamsky District. As an administrative division, it is, together with seven rural localities, incorporated within Volokolamsky District as the Town of Volokolamsk. As a municipal division, the Town of Volokolamsk is incorporated within Volokolamsky Municipal District as Volokolamsk Urban Settlement.

== International relations ==
=== Twin towns – sister cities ===
Volokolamsk is twinned with:

- Požarevac, Serbia (since 2013)

== In popular culture ==
Alexander Bek's 1944 novel, Volokolamsk Highway («Волоколамское шоссе»), is a lightly-fictionalized account of the defensive fighting by elements of the 316th Rifle Division along the road from Volokolamsk to Moscow in October 1941.

The online game War Thunder (where one controls Armored vehicles such as Tanks) features a ground forces map titled "Volokolamsk", and a larger version titled "Surroundings of Volokolamsk". The map is derided from players as being too open and being too big.

== Volokolamsk landfill ==
In Volokolamsk, there is a controversial landfill. Many protests have occurred over it as the landfill has given many people respiratory problems. The Russian authorities have not yet done anything about the problem.
