= Volokolamsk Highway =

Novel by Alexander Bek

Dustcover illustration of English edition of the novel.

Volokolamsk Highway (Russian: Волоколамское шоссе) is a novel written by Alexandr Bek, published in Russian in 1944, with later translations into English, Hebrew, Spanish, Chinese, German and many other languages during the 1940s and '50s. The novel, based on real events in October, 1941, during the Battle of Moscow, describes defensive fighting over several days by a single battalion of the 316th Rifle Division against elements of German Army Group Center. Both for its realism and for its practical advice on infantry tactics in modern war, Volokolamsk Highway became standard reading for junior officers in the Red Army and later Soviet Army, the forces of the arising State of Israel, and most socialist and revolutionary movements during the latter part of the 20th century. The novel has been out of print in English for several decades.

== Creation and inspiration ==
After a short term of service as a volunteer in the 8th (Krasnaya Presnya) Volunteer Rifle Division, Bek, who already had an established reputation as a writer, was reassigned as a war correspondent. In March, 1942, he was attached to the former 316th Rifle Division, now the 8th Guards "Panfilov" Rifle Division, where he met then-Captain Baurjan Momysh-Uly. Bek had been told of Momysh-Uly's heroic conduct as a Senior Lieutenant in command of the 1st Battalion of the 1077th Rifle Regiment in the October battles before Moscow. Bek saw this as the basis of a lightly-fictionalized novel to commemorate the defenders of the Soviet capital. Momysh-Uly was very reluctant to cooperate, but he eventually gave his story, and Bek captured his reluctance in the novel. In the end, Momysh-Uly strongly disapproved of Bek's book, which he claimed to be an unrealistic depiction of events, and criticized the author relentlessly for the remainder of his life. He later produced his own series of books to tell the story from his perspective.

== Plot summary ==
The structure of the novel is as an interview between a war correspondent and the commander of the battalion. The opening paragraph is as follows:

"In this book I am merely the faithful and conscientious scribe. Here is the story of the book."

The remainder of the novel is almost entirely told in the first person by Momysh-Uly, and is in two parts.

Part One begins with Momysh-Uly and the correspondent negotiating the terms of their collaboration. Momysh-Uly then recounts the arrival of the battalion along the Ruza River west of Moscow in October, 1941. In order to combat fear among his men he finds it necessary to order the execution of a sergeant who has deserted the line and shot himself through the hand. The next day he goes on to try to convince his men that their duty is not to die for their country, but to make their enemies die for theirs. Division commander I.V. Panfilov arrives in the battalion's position on Oct. 13. He points out that while the defensive positions of the battalion are good, Momysh-Uly has made no provisions for offensive action in the no-man's-land between the Ruza and the Germans. A party of picked men then successfully stage a deep raid at night against a German-held village, raising the morale of the entire battalion.

The story then goes back to July. The division is being organized near Alma-Ata, from men from Kazakhstan (like Momysh-Uly) and Kirghizia. The remainder of Part One describes the formation and training of the division, the growing personal relationship between Momysh-Uly and Panfilov, and the sound advice the former takes from the latter.

Part Two begins with the battalion dug in very thinly along the Ruza, trying to cover a sector 8 km wide. Other sectors are coming under attack from German tanks. Panfilov visits for an hour, and persuades Momysh-Uly to send two platoons into no-man's-land to set up ambush positions along the two roads leading to his sector, and describes how they should fall back to the main position. One platoon is very successful in this operation, but the second cuts and runs after its first encounter.

On Oct. 23 the main position comes under attack, with an artillery barrage directed by a spotting aircraft. Much of the barrage falls on dummy positions, and the battalion takes few casualties. Just as German infantry are about to attack, the Russian artillery observer is wounded by German shellfire, and Momysh-Uly (who is a former artilleryman) takes over, directing fire from the eight guns supporting his battalion from a church steeple. This fire blunts the German attack.

At the close of the day, Momysh-Uly learns that Germans to his north have penetrated the front, and that the scratch battalion to his south has been routed; he is facing encirclement. He helps lead a counter-attack to the north, then orders a retreat eastwards to a grove of woods. Following this, he is presented with 87 stragglers from the routed scratch battalion. At first he wants nothing to do with them, as they had already broken and run once. On impulse he decides to test them, by leading them into a night counter-attack against the Germans in the village they have captured just east of the Ruza. To his surprise, all 87 follow him and redeem themselves by killing Germans, destroying a lot of their equipment, and burning their bridge across the river. He then welcomes them to join his battalion. He further orders them to recover their battalion guns, which delays the withdrawal of the rest of the battalion, almost fatally. In the end, Momysh-Uly devises a tactic to enable his entire combat group to escape from encirclement, breaking through German forces bogged down in the mud, and the troops rejoin the division in Volokolamsk, much to the approval of Gen. Panfilov.

== Impact of the novel ==
Bek also wrote two sequels, Several Days and General Panfilov's Reserve. The series gained international, as well as Soviet, recognition: Published in Hebrew in 1946, Volokolamsk Highway "held an almost cult status in the Palmach and later in the Israeli Army" according to media researcher Yuval Shachal, and became a standard tactical handbook in the Israeli Defense Forces. Inspired by the novel, future Israeli Chief of the General Staff Motta Gur once held a "Panfilov Roll Call" for two soldiers who deserted from his company when he was a young officer, shaming them in front of the other troops; he wrote that it was a common practice in the IDF at the time. During 2005, Ehud Barak told "we, as young officers, were raised on Momyshuly." Volokolamsk Highway was popular in Cuba, as well. Fidel Castro told Norberto Fuentes that "the idea to use the love of the Motherland for convincing people to support me, came to me after reading the novel." The novel was well known among members of the Cuban Revolutionary Armed Forces; in 1961, Raúl Castro told a journalist that every regimental commander was "compelled to have a copy". In Jesús Díaz's acclaimed 1987 novel Las iniciales de la tierra, the protagonist cites Bek's book as a major influence on his life. The novel was also included in the list of "compulsory reading" for members of the Chinese Communist Party and People's Liberation Army personnel. On 27 June 1963, the East German Ministry of National Defense issued its Order no. 50/63 - drafted on the initiative of Walter Ulbricht - which introduced Volokolamsk Highway as part of the political education program for the soldiers of the National People's Army. In the official history of the NVA, historian Major General Reinhard Brühl had cited it as having a major influence on the soldiers.
