= Ivan Panfilov =

Soviet general (1893–1941)

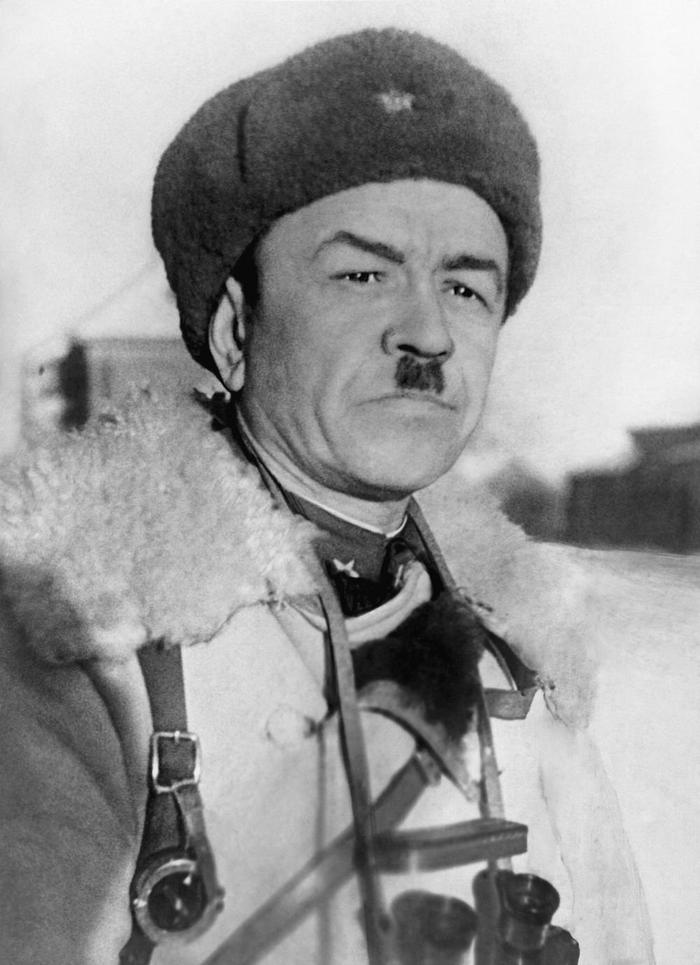
- Born: 1 January 1893; Petrovsk, Saratov Governorate, Russian Empire
- Died: 18 November 1941 (aged 48); Guseniovo, Volokolamsky District, Soviet Union
- Burial place: Novodevichy Cemetery
- Military career
- Allegiance: Russian Empire (1915–1917); USSR (1918–1941)
- Service years: 1915–1941
- Rank: Major General
- Nicknames: Dad, Aqsaqal
- Commands: 316th Rifle Division
- Conflicts: World War I Russian Civil War; Polish–Soviet War; Basmachi Revolt; World War II
- Awards: Hero of the Soviet Union; Order of Lenin; Order of the Red Banner (3); Jubilee Medal "XX Years of the Workers' and Peasants' Red Army"

Ivan Vasilyevich Panfilov (Russian: Иван Васильевич Панфилов; 1 January 1893 [O.S. 20 December 1892] – 18 November 1941) was a Soviet general and a posthumous Hero of the Soviet Union, known for his command of the 316th Rifle Division during the defense of Moscow at the Second World War.

== Biography ==
=== Early life ===
Panfilov was born in Petrovsk. After the death of his mother in 1904, the child was forced to quit school and started working in a local shop when he was eleven years old. His father died in 1912.

In 1915, during the First World War, Panfilov was drafted into the Imperial Russian Army and stationed in the 638th Olpinsk Infantry Regiment. Afterwards, he was transferred to the Southwestern Front, where he was promoted to sergeant. During 1917, following the February Revolution, Panfilov was elected by his fellow soldiers to be a member of the Regimental Soviet.

=== Civil War ===
After the October Revolution and the beginning of the Russian Civil War, Panfilov volunteered into the nascent Red Army in 1918, where he was stationed as a platoon commander in the 25th Rifle Division under the command of Vasily Chapayev. In March 1919, the division was sent to the Urals to confront the Cossack White army led by Alexander Dutov, a follower of Admiral Aleksandr Kolchak. In the autumn, Panfilov's regiment was transferred to the southern city of Tsaritsyn, taking part in the battle against Anton Denikin's forces. During the campaign, Panfilov contacted typhus and had to be evacuated to the rear.

In April 1920, after recovering, he volunteered to return to active duty. He was assigned as a platoon commander to the 100th Infantry Regiment and fought in the Polish-Soviet War, joining the Russian Communist Party (Bolsheviks) in September (membership number: 0291274). For his performances during the fighting, Panfilov was awarded the Order of the Red Banner in 1921. Afterwards, Panfilov joined the 183rd Border Battalion in Ukraine and took part in counter-insurgency operations against local guerrillas. In November 1921, he entered the Sergey Kamenev Infantry School in Kiev. In the same year, he married Maria Kolomietz, with whom he had five children: four daughters – Valentina, Evgenia, Galina and Maya – and a son, Vladlen. After graduating in September 1923, he was posted to the 52nd Yaroslavl Infantry Regiment with the rank of company commander.

=== Central Asia ===
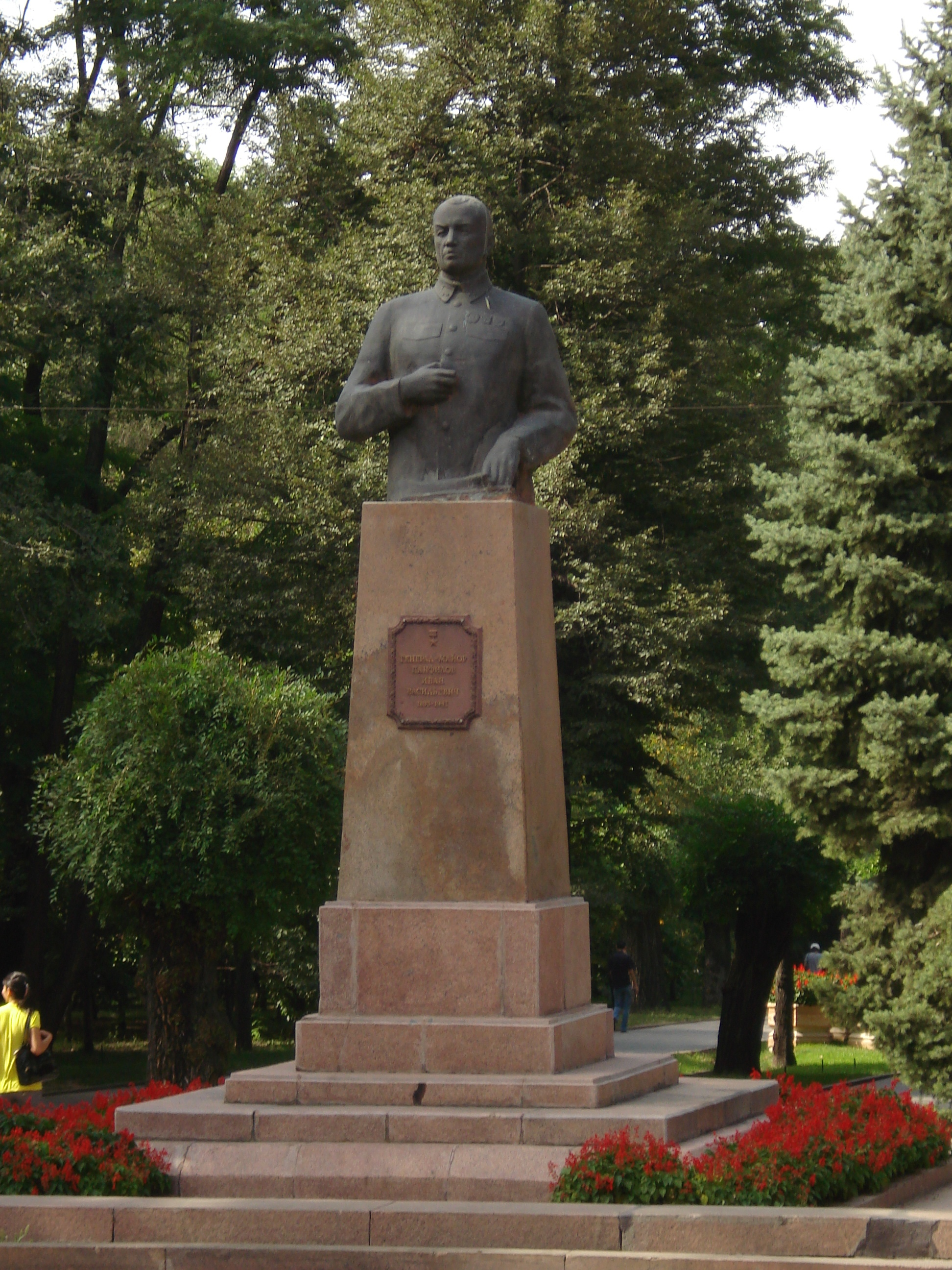
Panfilov's bust in Almaty.

In March 1924, Panfilov volunteered for the campaign against the Basmachi and traveled to the Turkestan Military District. In April, he was given command of a company in the 1st Turkestan Rifle Regiment. In October he was transferred to head the Regimental School. In August 1925, he was returned to the field and later commanded an outpost in the Pamir Mountains. In April 1928 he was promoted to command a regiment, a post he held for three years. His involvement in the quelling of the Basmachi revolt gained him his second Order of the Red Banner, awarded in 1929.

In June 1931, Panfilov was appointed commander of the 8th Independent Rifle Battalion. In December 1932 he was transferred to head the 9th Red Banner Mountain Infantry Regiment. From 1935, Panfilov served in an instruction post in the Vladimir Lenin Red Banner Military Academy in Tashkent. In September 1937 he was designated the Central Asian Military District's chief of staff. In October 1938 he was assigned as the military commissar of the Kyrgyz SSR, and promoted to Combrig on 26 January 1939. On 4 June 1940 he received the rank of Major General.

After Germany invaded the Soviet Union on 22 June 1941, Panfilov began mobilizing reserves to be sent to the front. On 12 July he was assigned as the commander of the 316th Rifle Division, a new unit being formed in Alma Ata. The division consisted mainly of reservists from the Kazakh and Kyrgyz Soviet Republics.

=== Battle of Moscow ===
On 27 August 1941, the division arrived in Borovichi, near Leningrad, and joined the Fifty-Second Army. On 2 September, it was consigned to the reserve, spending a month in the rear.

On 7 October, after the Wehrmacht commenced Operation Typhoon, the division was sent to the Moscow region, where it arrived on the 10th. It was stationed on the left flank of General Konstantin Rokossovsky's Sixteenth Army and tasked with defending a 41-kilometer long sector to the south of Volokolamsk, a part of the Mozhaisk fortified line.

On 15 October, the Germans attacked the region. After two weeks of fighting, the 316th was abandoned by the other defenders. Together with the rest of the Sixteenth Army, the division retreated towards Moscow. In spite of suffering heavy casualties, the 316th managed to significantly delay the German advance on the capital, buying time for the defenders of the city. On 11 November, Panfilov was awarded his third Order of the Red Banner for the personal courage he displayed during the fighting. According to historian Richard Overy, Marshal Georgy Zhukov told Panfilov that he would be shot if he were to retreat.

The 316th Division's new line of defense, near the village of Dubosekovo, was overrun by the Germans on 15–16 November; Soviet newspapers later claimed that on the 16th, twenty-eight soldiers from the division's 1075th Regiment destroyed eighteen German tanks while fighting to the last man, though an investigation by a Soviet military judge in 1948 revealed the tale was exaggerated. The threat to Rokossovsky's flank prompted the Stavka to send in the reserve 78th Siberian Rifle Division. The 78th's soldiers were forced to retreat after three days, but the Wehrmacht's advance was slowed down due to the Soviets' resistance and the weather conditions, gradually grinding into a standstill.

On 17 November, the People's Commissar of Defense passed a decree to grant the 316th the status of a Guards formation, renaming it the 8th Guards Rifle Division. On the 18th, a group of correspondents visited Panfilov's command post in the village of Guseniovo, and informed him of the resolution. While he briefed the journalists in the open, they came under a mortar attack. Panfilov was killed by a shell splinter. The Defense Commissar's edict was brought into effect on that day.

== Demeanor ==
I. V. Panfilov was noted for his care for ordinary soldiers. There is evidence that before the war he sent dispatches to the Kremlin asking them to provide warm clothing, uniforms, and other everyday necessities for the troops. In 1945, war correspondents recorded an inscription on the walls of the Reichstag: “We are Panfilov’s men. Thank you, Father, for the felt boots.”

According to his granddaughter Aigul Baikadamova, Panfilov managed to find “common ground” with his multinational division because “he lived in Central Asia for a long time, knew the customs, traditions, and languages of these peoples, and was able to become a true father-commander to them.”

== Legacy ==
=== Aftermath ===
On 23 November, the 8th Guards was awarded the sobriquet Panfilovskaya in honor of its fallen commander, and its soldiers were henceforth known as "Panfilov's Men" (Panfilovtsy). It took part in the Red Army's counter-offensive which drove the Wehrmacht away from Moscow during December. The division ended the Second World War in Latvia, as part of the forces besieging the German pocket in Courland.

On 12 April 1942, Panfilov was posthumously awarded the title Hero of the Soviet Union. The general is buried in the Novodevichy Cemetery alongside two other Heroes of the USSR, Lev Dovator and Viktor Talalikhin.

=== Literature ===
Panfilov's character gained recognition through the book trilogy authored by Alexander Bek, which described the fighting around Moscow through the eyes of Baurzhan Momyshuly, a Kazakh officer who served under Panfilov in the 316th Division. The books – Volokolamsk Highway, Several Days, and General Panfilov's Reserve – were popular both in the USSR and abroad. In particular, Volokolamsk Highway had wide influence as a tactical and motivational text within the Israel Defense Forces, the Cuban Revolutionary Armed Forces, China's People's Liberation Army, and East Germany's National People's Army. Volokolamsk Highway served as one of the settings for an eponymous series of five plays by Heiner Müller, written from 1984 to 1987. The first part, "Russian Opening", was based on Heinrich von Kleist's The Prince of Homburg. In Müller's reinterpretation, Momyshuly assumes the role of the Great Elector.

Momyshuly had himself turned to writing after the war, and discussed the battles near Volokolamsk in several works, like Moscow Is Behind Us and Our General, Ivan Panfilov.

=== Controversy ===
The director of Russia's State Archive of Socio-Political History Sergei Mironenko called the legend of Panfilov's 28 Guardsmen to be a deliberate falsification. On March 16, 2016, Sergei Mironenko left his post after he reached the age limit for civil servants in 65 years. He retained the position of the supervisor of the State Archive. Mironenko claimed that he left his post at his own request, in order to "focus on scientific work": "Do you really think that I would not fight if it was not my decision? ... There is nothing to worry about in my dismissal."

The Russian Culture Minister was quoted saying "even if this story was invented from start to finish, if there had been no Panfilov, if there had been nothing, this is a sacred legend that shouldn't be interfered with. People that do that are filthy scum."

=== List of places named after Ivan Panfilov ===
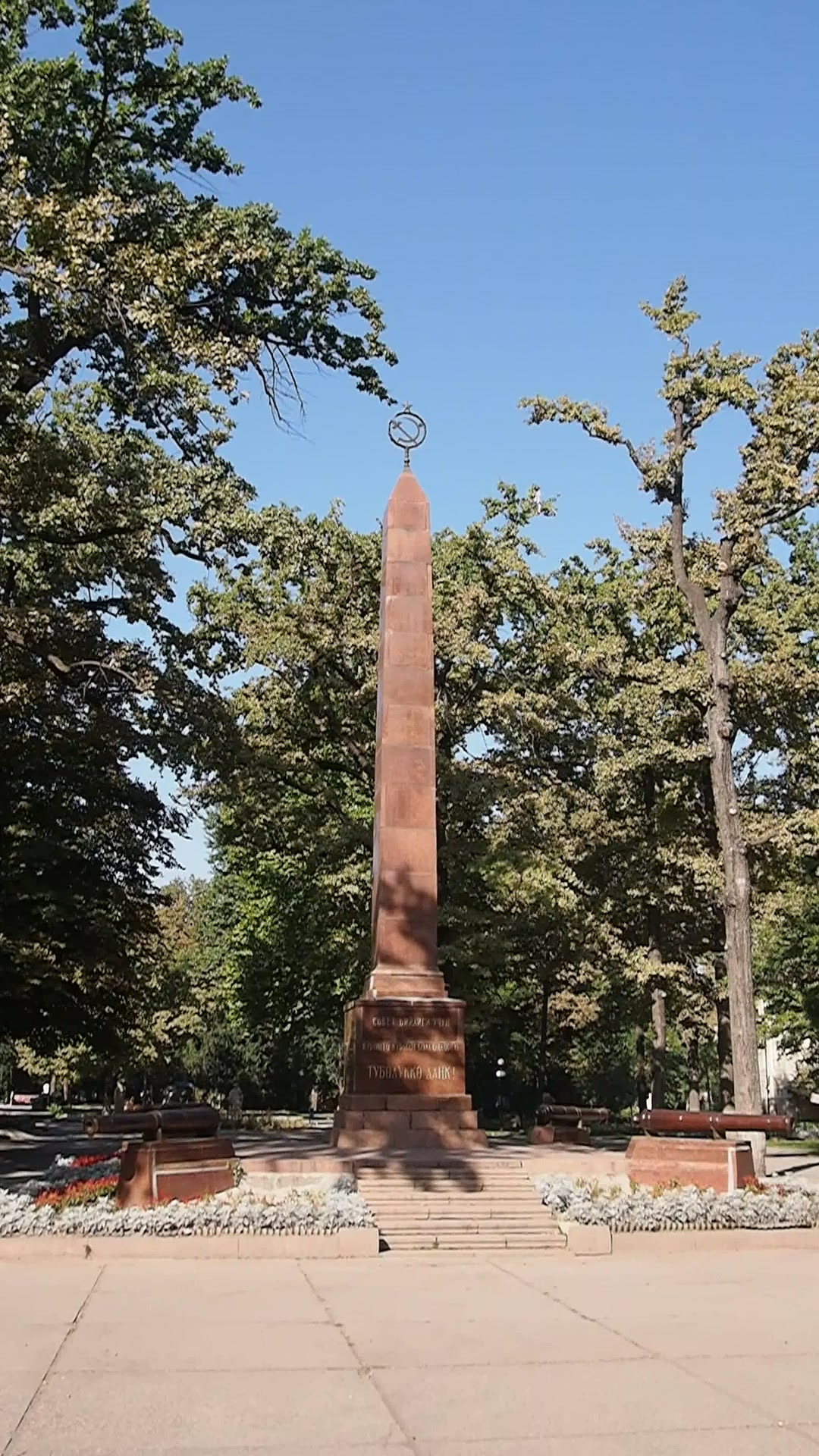
Panfilov Park, Bishkek

- Geroyev Panfilovtsev Street in Severnoye Tushino neighborhood, Moscow.
- Panfilov Peak, a 4300-meter high summit in the Kyrgyz Tien Shan Mountains.
- Panfilov District in Kazakhstan's Almaty Region.
- Panfilov District in Kyrgyzstan's Chüy Region.
- Panfilov Park in Bishkek, Kyrgyzstan.
- Panfilov Park in Almaty, Kazakhstan.
- The city of Zharkent was called "Panfilov" between 1942 and 1991.
- Panfilov Prospekt, an offshoot of the Leningradskoye highway in Zelenograd, Moscow.
- Panfilov Street in Zelenograd, Moscow.
- Panfilov Street in Sokol neighborhood, Moscow and Panfilovskaya station of Moscow Central Ring.
- Panfilov Street in Volokolamsk.
- Panfilov Street in Nakhabino, Krasnogorsky County.
- Panfilov Street in Krasnogvardeysky District, Saint Petersburg.
- Panfilov Street in Perm.
- Panfilov Street in Saransk.
- Panfilov Street in Taganrog.
- Panfilov Street in Almaty.
- Panfilov Street in Nur-Sultan.
- Panfilov Street in Bishkek
- Panfilov Street in Lutsk.
- Panfilov Street in Dnipropetrovsk.
- Panfilov Street in Lipetsk.
- Panfilov Street in Barnaul.
- Panfilov Street in Saratov.

=== Portrayal in the media ===
Ivan Panfilov has been depicted by the following actors in film and television productions:

- Vsevolod Sanaev in the 1968 film Moscow is Behind Us.
- Georgi Burkov in the 1984 TV mini-series Volokolamsk Highway.
- Konstantin Stepnakov in the 1985 film Battle of Moscow.
- Maksim Abrosimov in the 2016 film Panfilov's 28 Men.
