= 316th Rifle Division =

316th Rifle Division (July 12, 1941 – 1945)
- Active: 1941–1945
- Country: Soviet Union
- Branch: Red Army
- Type: Infantry
- Size: Division
- Engagements: Battle of Moscow; Battle of Stalingrad

The 316th Rifle Division was formed as a Red Army division during World War II. The division was initially formed in July 1941, renamed the 8th Guards Rifle Division on 18 November 1941. The division was recreated at Vjasniki in July 1942, fought in the early battles around Stalingrad and was disbanded in November 1942. The division was recreated for the third time from the 57th and 131st Rifle Brigades in September 1943. The division ended the war assigned to the 27th Army of the 3rd Ukrainian Front.

== History ==
=== 1st Formation ===
After Germany invaded the Soviet Union on 22 June 1941, reserves were mobilized to be sent to the front. On 12 July 1941, the 316th Rifle Division was established in Alma Ata, the capital of the Kazakh SSR. Major General Ivan Panfilov, the military commissar of the Kyrgyz SSR, was appointed its commander. The reservists allotted to the 316th were mostly from the two republics; when formed, the division was noted as being 90 percent Kazakh and Kirgiz, with 10 percent Russians. It consisted of three infantry regiments: the 1073rd, the 1075th and the 1077th.

The 316th soldiers' were sworn in on 1 August, and boarded trains to the front from the 18th to the 20th. They arrived in Borovichi, near Malaya Vishera, in late August. Intense fighting against the Germans already took place in the region, as part of the campaign to defend Leningrad from the attack of Army Group North. The 316th was involved in several skirmishes, but on 8 September was consigned as the reserve of the 52nd Army. It spent a month in the rear.

==== Subordinate Units ====
- 1073rd Rifle Regiment
- 1075th Rifle Regiment
- 1077th Rifle Regiment
- 857th Artillery Regiment
- 597th Sapper Battalion
- 690th Rifle Regiment (Attached from 126th Rifle Division) 14 October

=== 2nd Formation ===
Formed in late June to 10 July 1942 at Vyazniki in the Moscow Military District. The cadre for the unit came from either the 41st, 52nd or 157th Rifle Brigades. The division was assigned to the 9th Reserve Army in the STAVKA reserve and remained there until late August. The division was then assigned to the 8th Reserve Army and remained assigned to the army when it was redesignated as the 66th Army on 24 August and sent south to the Stalingrad Front. From the divisions arrival at the front in September it fought under the 24th, 66th, and 1st Guards Armies. The division was practically destroyed in the fighting and on 4 November 1942 the division headquarters was disbanded and the remnants of the division used to reinforce the 260th Rifle Division.

==== Subordinate Units ====
- 1073rd Rifle Regiment
- 1075th Rifle Regiment
- 1077th Rifle Regiment
- 857th Artillery Regiment
- 597th Sapper Battalion

=== 3rd Formation ===
The third formation of the 316th Rifle Division began on Sept. 3, 1943, based on the 57th Rifle Brigade and the 131st Rifle Brigade in the 11th Rifle Corps of 9th Army of the North Caucasus Front. Its order of battle remained as previous.

Postwar, the division moved to Mogilev-Podolsky with the 37th Rifle Corps. It was disbanded either before or around July 1946 when the corps disbanded.

== In popular culture ==
The first formation of the 316th, and specifically one battalion of the 1073rd Rifle Regiment, commanded by Senior Lieutenant Bauyrzhan Momyshuly, in the battles before Moscow, was immortalized in Aleksandr Bek's novel Volokolamsk Highway.

== See also ==
- List of infantry divisions of the Soviet Union 1917–1957
