= Ruza (river) =

River in Russia

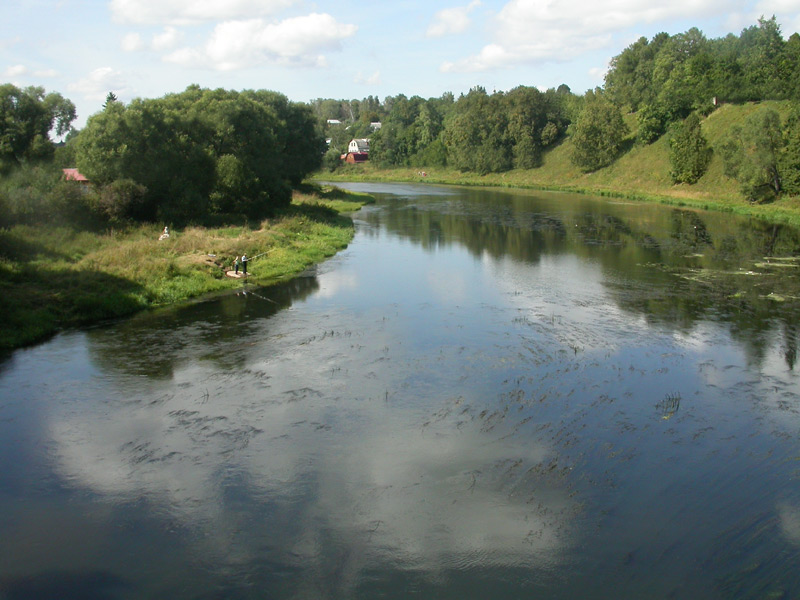
- Native name: Руза (Russian)

Location
- Country: Russia

Physical characteristics
- Mouth: Moskva
  - coordinates: 55.6283°N 36.2813°E
- Length: 145 km (90 mi)
- Basin size: 1,990 km^{2} (770 sq mi)

Basin features
- Progression: Moskva→ Oka→ Volga→ Caspian Sea

The Ruza (Russian: Руза) is a river in Moscow Oblast, Russia. It is a left tributary of the Moskva. The length of the river is 145 kilometres (90 mi). The area of its basin is 1,990 square kilometres (770 sq mi). It usually freezes over in November and stays under the ice until April.
