= Alexander Bek =

Soviet novelist and writer (1903–1972)

- Александр Бек
- Born: 3 January 1903; Saratov Governorate, Russian Empire
- Died: 2 November 1972 (aged 69); Moscow, Russian SFSR, Soviet Union

Alexander Alfredovich Bek (Russian: Александр Альфредович Бек; 3 January 1903 [O.S. 21 December 1902] – 2 November 1972), sometimes transliterated from the Russian Cyrillic as Aleksandr Bek or Anglicized to Alexander Beck, was a Soviet novelist, war correspondent, and writer.

== Biography ==
Alexander Bek was born on 3 January 1903. The son of a physician employed by the Imperial Russian Army, Bek received an upbringing in his native city of Saratov, where he attended a Realschule.

Following the Russian Revolution of 1917 and the outbreak of the Russian Civil War between the Red and White movements, he joined the Bolsheviks' Red Army as a sixteen-year-old volunteer and began contributing articles to the army's divisional newspaper in 1919. His first novel, Kurako, completed in honor of the outstanding russian metallurgist Mikhail Kurako and set down following the impressions left on Bek after a visit to the town of Kuznetsk, was published in 1934. Several other works in the style of socialist realism were written during the 1930s.

Bek returned for duty in the Red Army during World War II at Moscow as a volunteer in the 3rd Company, 1st Battalion, 24th Regiment of the 8th (Krasnaya Presnya) Volunteer Rifle Division, known as "The Writers' Company". However, before entering combat he was reassigned to serve as a war correspondent, in which role he witnessed the Soviet defense of Moscow in 1941. He produced one of his life's most famous works, Volokolamsk Highway («Волоколамское шоссе»), in 1944, depicting the heroism of Moscow's defenders. He witnessed the surrender of Nazi Germany in World War II in Berlin the following year.

The more famous of Bek's 1950s and 1960s works included the Several Days («Несколько дней») and General Panfilov's Reserve («Резерв генерала Панфилова»), both of which appeared in 1960, as well as the 1956 Talent (The Life of Berezhkov) («Талант (Жизнь Бережкова)»), which appeared in English as Berezhkov - The Story Of An Inventor and was based on the real life of a specialist involved in the Soviet automobile industry.

Bek's 1965 novel The New Appointment was written as a roman à clef centered around Soviet politician Ivan Tevosian, who under Joseph Stalin's period as head of the Soviet Union had been appointed to play a key role in heading the Soviet metallurgical production. Despite the initial announcement of the book's publication in the pages of Novy Mir, the novel was not published in the Soviet Union until 1986 – in large part as a result of the protests of Tevosian's widow, who complained that the work unfairly discussed the more private aspects of her late husband's life. Accordingly, The New Appointment first appeared in Frankfurt am Main in 1972.

Bek died on 2 November 1972 in Moscow.

== English Translations ==
- Volokolamsk Highway, Foreign Languages Publishing House, date unknown.
- And Not to Die: A Novel, SRT Publications, 1949.
- Berezhkov: The Story of an Inventor, Foreign Languages Publishing House, 1958.
