= Colour revolution =

21st century protests in Eastern Europe

Colour revolutions
- Part of Protests against democratic backsliding
- Date: 5 October 2000 onwards
- Location: Post-Soviet states, Federal Republic of Yugoslavia (today Serbia and Montenegro)
- Caused by: Authoritarianism; Electoral fraud; Human rights violations; Kleptocracy; Political corruption
- Methods: Civil disobedience; Civil disorder; Internet activism; Nonviolent resistance; Political demonstration; Student activism
- Result: Establishment of new governments (in Georgia, Kyrgyzstan, Yugoslavia, and Ukraine); Violent suppression of protests (in Belarus, Russia and Kazakhstan); Spread of liberal democracy in the former Soviet Union; Failure of post-revolution governments to substantially reduce corruption; A resurgence in anti-Americanism and jingoism in post-Soviet Russia

The colour revolutions (Note: Also spelled color revolutions.) are a series of protests and attempted or successful changes of government and society, particularly in post-Soviet states or states allied to Russia. The aim of colour revolutions is to establish liberal democracy, in opposition to corruption, autocracy and authoritarianism. They have often been triggered by election results widely viewed as falsified.

The term was popularised after successful revolutions in Georgia, Ukraine and Kyrgyzstan between 2003 and 2005, which political scientists Valerie Jane Bunce and Seva Gunitsky describe as a wave of democracy occurring between the Revolutions of 1989 and the 2010–2012 Arab Spring.

Some of the movements successful in their goal of removing the government include:

- Federal Republic of Yugoslavia's Bulldozer Revolution (2000)
- Georgia's Rose Revolution (2003)
- Ukraine's Orange Revolution (2004)
- Kyrgyzstan's Tulip Revolution (2005)
- Armenia's Velvet Revolution (2018).

The colour revolutions have been marked by the use of the social media as a method of communication, as well as a strong role of non-governmental organizations in the protests.

The Russian, Chinese and Iranian governments have accused the Western world of orchestrating colour revolutions to expand its influence. In turn, authoritarian governments, right-wing populists and pro-Russian groups have been accused of using the term to delegitimise pro-democracy and human rights protests. Russia has invaded two countries, Georgia in 2008 and Ukraine in 2014 and 2022, after successful popular movements.

== Background ==
A definition of "colour revolution" suggested by Pavel Baev is "A mass protest or an unarmed uprising aimed at replacing, through elections, the sitting government that represents a semi/quasi-democratic regime." He noted that this definition was deliberately vague, but the revolutions did not target any reorganization of society or redistribution of property, had a non-violent nature, and a close connection with elections.

An earlier revolution named for a colour or flower was the 1974 Carnation Revolution in Portugal.

=== Student movements ===
The first of the student movements was Otpor! ('Resistance!') in the Federal Republic of Yugoslavia, founded at Belgrade University in October 1998 and began protesting against President Slobodan Miloševic during the Kosovo War. Most of them were already veterans of anti-Milošević demonstrations such as the 1996–97 protests and the 9 March 1991 protest. Many of its members were arrested or beaten by the police. Despite this, during the presidential campaign in September 2000, Otpor! launched its Gotov je (He's finished) campaign that galvanized Serbian discontent with Milošević and resulted in his defeat.

Members of Otpor! have inspired and trained members of related student movements, including Kmara in Georgia, PORA in Ukraine, Zubr in Belarus, and MJAFT! in Albania. These groups have been explicit and scrupulous in their non-violent resistance, as advocated and explained in Gene Sharp's writings.

== Successful protests ==
=== Serbia (2000) ===
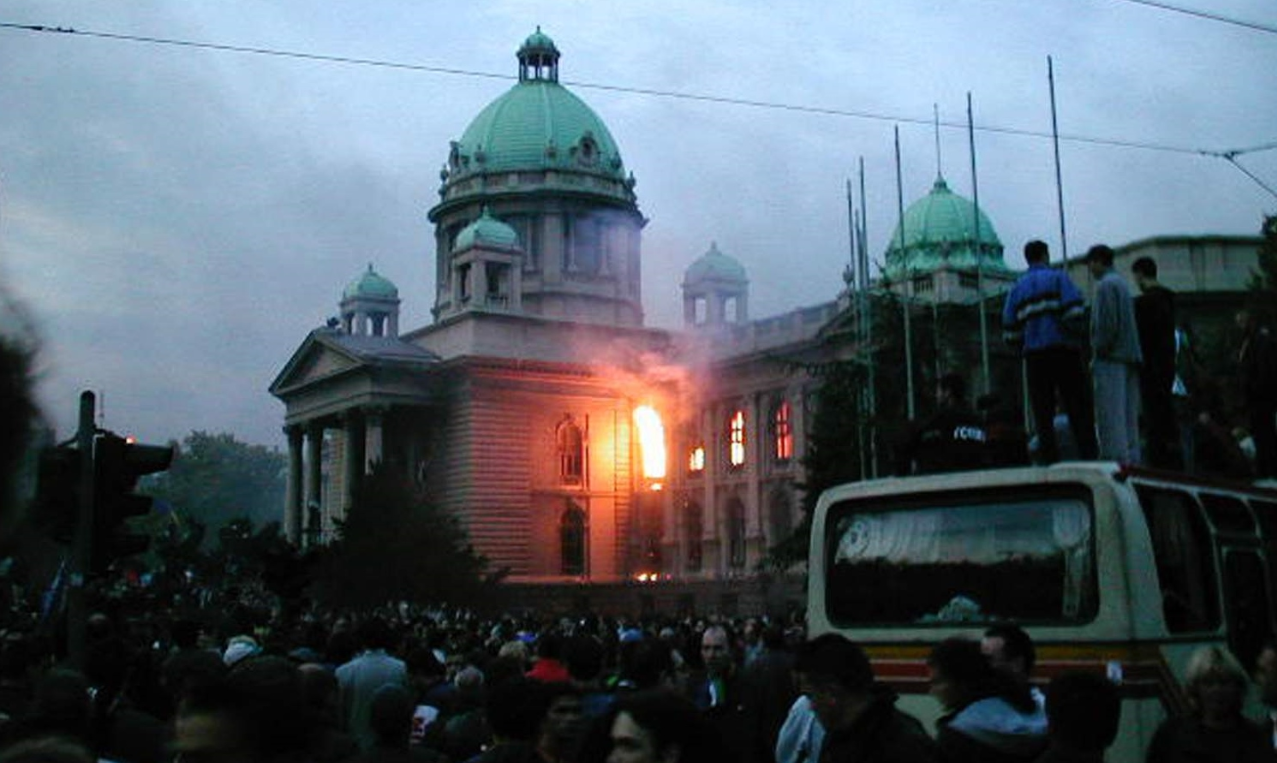
The House of the National Assembly burning during the 2000 Bulldozer Revolution

In the 2000 Yugoslavian general election, activists that opposed the government of Milošević created a unified opposition and engaged in civic mobilization through get-out-the-vote campaigns. This approach had been used in other parliamentary elections in Bulgaria (1997), Slovakia (1998), and Croatia (2000). However, election results were contested with the Federal Election Commission announcing that opposition candidate Vojislav Koštunica had not received the absolute majority necessary to avoid a runoff election despite some political sources believing he had earned nearly 55% of the vote. Discrepancies in vote totals and the incineration of election documents by authorities lead the opposition alliance to accuse the government of electoral fraud.

Protests erupted in Belgrade, culminating in the overthrow of Slobodan Milošević. The demonstrations were supported by the youth movement Otpor!, some of whose members were later involved in revolutions in other countries. These demonstrations are usually considered to be the first example of the peaceful revolutions that followed in former Soviet states. Despite the nationwide protesters not adopting a colour or a specific symbol, the slogan "Gotov je" (Serbian Cyrillic: Готов је, lit. 'He is finished') become a defining symbol in retrospect, celebrating the success of the protests. The protests have come to be known as the Bulldozer Revolution due to the use of a wheel loader that protesters drove into the building used by Radio Television of Serbia, which was the main broadcast arm of Milošević's government.

==== Anti-corruption protests (2024–2026) and 2026 parliamentary election ====
After the Novi Sad railway station canopy collapse in November 2024, a student-led mass protest movement began, protesting against government corruption and authoritarianism. President Aleksandar Vučić dismissed the protests as an attempted "colour revolution". In September 2026, Vučić resigned as president in order to contest a snap parliamentary election, which the students contested as the Student List. The Student List won 53.7% of the vote, defeating Vučić's Serbian Progressive Party on 39.5%. With Vučić in power since 2014, Reuters called the election a "profound political shift" for Serbia, and likened it to the defeat of Viktor Orbán in the 2026 Hungarian parliamentary election.

=== Georgia (2003) ===
The Rose Revolution or Revolution of Roses (Georgian: ვარდების რევოლუცია, romanized: vardebis revolutsia) was a nonviolent change of power that occurred in Georgia in November 2003. The event was brought about by widespread protests over the disputed parliamentary elections and culminated in the resignation of President Eduard Shevardnadze, which marked the end of Soviet-era leadership in the country. The revolution derives its name from the climactic moment, when demonstrators led by Mikheil Saakashvili stormed the Parliament session with red roses in hand.

==== Adjara ====
The Adjara crisis (Georgian: აჭარის კრიზისი, romanized: ach'aris k'rizisi), also known as the Adjarian Revolution or the Second Rose Revolution, was a political crisis in Georgia's Adjaran Autonomous Republic, then led by Aslan Abashidze, who refused to obey the central authorities after President Eduard Shevardnadze's ouster during the Rose Revolution of November 2003. The crisis threatened to develop into military confrontation as both sides mobilized their forces at the internal border. However, Georgia's post-revolutionary government of President Mikheil Saakashvili managed to avoid bloodshed and with the help of Adjaran opposition reasserted its supremacy. Abashidze left the region in exile in May 2004 and was succeeded by Levan Varshalomidze.

=== Ukraine (2004) ===
The Orange Revolution (Ukrainian: Помаранчева революція, romanized: Pomarancheva revoliutsiia) was a series of protests that led to political upheaval in Ukraine from late November 2004 to January 2005. It gained momentum primarily due to the initiative of the general population, sparked by the aftermath of the 2004 Ukrainian presidential election runoff which was claimed to be marred by massive corruption, voter intimidation, and electoral fraud. Kyiv, the Ukrainian capital, was the focal point of the movement's campaign of civil resistance, with thousands of protesters demonstrating daily. Nationwide, this was highlighted by a series of acts of civil disobedience, sit-ins, and general strikes organized by the opposition movement.

=== Kyrgyzstan (2005) ===
The Tulip Revolution, also known as the First Kyrgyz Revolution, led to Kyrgyzstan's then-President Askar Akayev's fall from power. The revolution began after parliamentary elections on 27 February and 13 March 2005. The revolutionaries alleged corruption and authoritarianism by Akayev, his family and supporters. Akayev fled to Kazakhstan and then to Russia. On 4 April 2005, at the Kyrgyz embassy in Moscow, Akayev signed his resignation statement in the presence of a Kyrgyz parliamentary delegation. The resignation was ratified by the Kyrgyz interim parliament on 11 April 2005.

=== Moldova (2009) ===
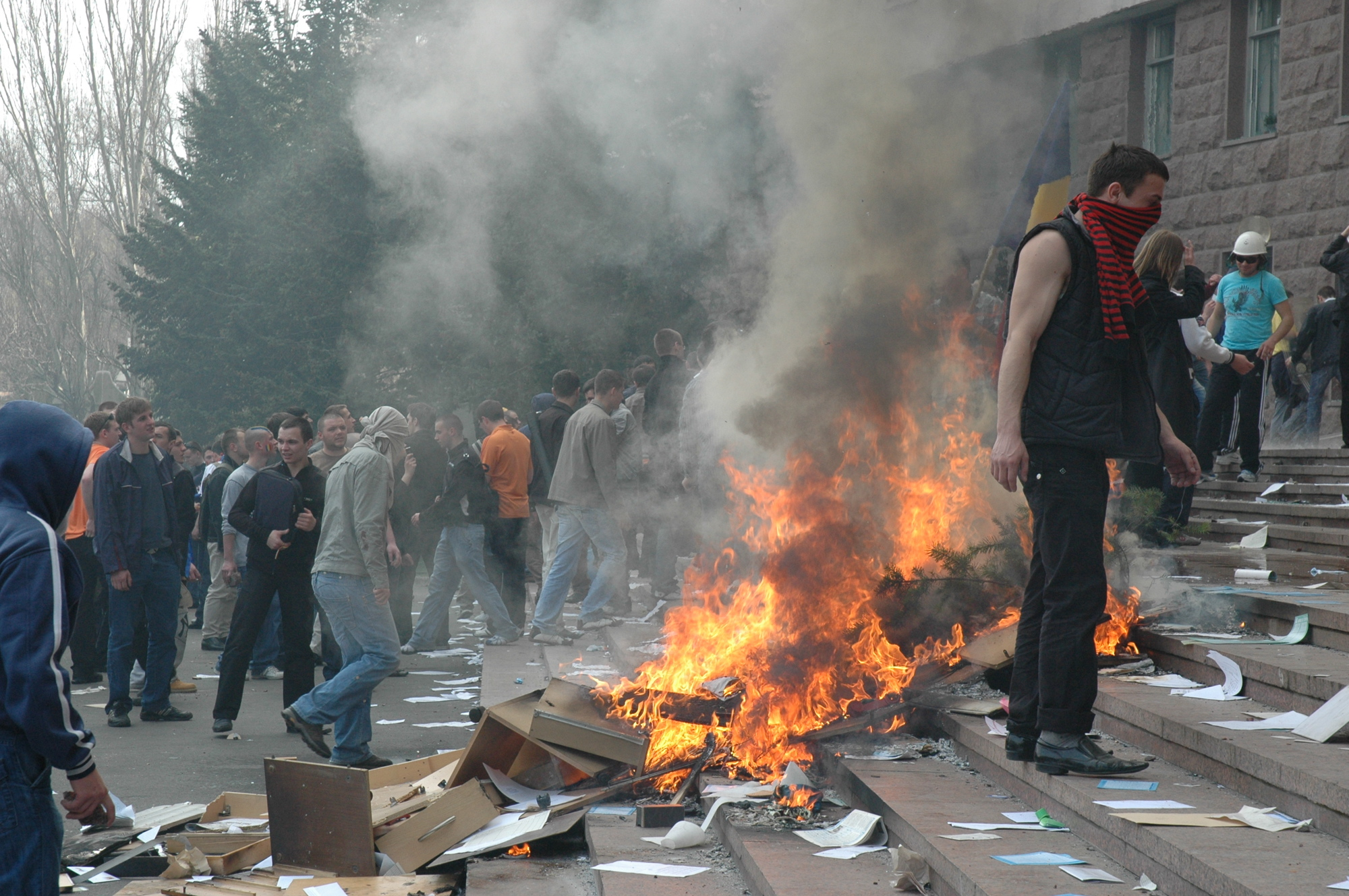
Rioters in Chișinău during the April 2009 Moldovan parliamentary election protests

There was civil unrest, described by some as a revolution, all over Moldova following the 2009 Parliamentary election, owing to the opposition's assertion that the communists had fixed the election. In the lead-up to the election, there had been an overwhelming pro-communist bias in the media, and the composition of electoral registers was subject to scrutiny. European electoral observers had concluded that there was "undue administrative influence" in the election. There had also been anger at president Vladimir Voronin, who had agreed to step down as term limits in the constitution required but who then said he would retain a key role in politics, leading to fears that there would be no real change in power. The views and actions of the Soviet-trained and Russian-speaking political elite contrasted with the majority of the country's population as a whole, which favoured a more pro-European direction. Also key to the context was the question of relations with Romania, which Moldova had been separated from after Russian occupation under the Nazi-Soviet Pact of 1939. Demands for closer relations with Romania had increased due to Romania's EU membership contrasting with economic stagnation and failure in Moldova. Under the communists, Moldova had the status of the poorest country in Europe, and international agencies had criticised the government for failing to address corruption and for limiting press freedoms.

The government attempted to discredit the protests by claiming foreign involvement of Romania, but little evidence existed which suggested this was the case. Between 10,000 and 15,000 people joined protests on 6 and 7 April 2009 in the capital city of Chișinău. Some of the chants protesters were heard to say were "We want Europe", "We are Romanians" and "Down with Communism". With social media playing a role in the organisation of the protests, the internet was cut off in the capital by the government, and president Voronin declared the protesters to be "fascists intoxicated with hatred". Voronin's reaction to the protests were subject to criticism; he utilised the secret police, oversaw mass arrests, sealed the country's borders and censored media, leading to comparisons to Stalinist methods of communist repression. Amnesty International and the BBC reported on numerous cases of torture and ill-treatment and brutality towards protesters. Russia backed and supported the ruling Moldovan communist government. The only foreign leader to congratulate Voronin and Moldova after the disputed election was Russian president Dmitry Medvedev. Analysts observed that the protests appeared to be spontaneous and that they partly originated from protesters dislike of the government's increasing compliance with Russia.

One of the key demands of the protests was achieved when a recount of votes in the election was accepted and ordered by president Voronin. Then, in July 2009 a new election was held in which opposition parties won a slight majority of the vote, which was seen as a decisive success for the four pro-Western, pro-European parties. One of the factors believed to have led to the opposition victory was the anger at the way the communist government had handled the April protests. The deputy leader of the opposition Liberal Party stated that "Democracy has won". The opposition alliance (named the Alliance for European Integration) created a governing coalition that pushed the Party of Communists into opposition.

=== North Macedonia (2016) ===
In 2016, due to perceived authoritarian actions of the government mass protests began in the Republic of Macedonia against the ruling VMRO-DPMNE party. The protests, referred to as the Colorful Revolution (Macedonian: Шарена револуција), were a turning point in Macedonian politics, with the nationalist conservative policies of the previous establishment being replaced with reconciliatory policies towards Bulgaria and Greece and the EU and NATO path of Republic of Macedonia.

=== Armenia (2018) ===
The 2018 Armenian Revolution, most commonly known in Armenia as #MerzhirSerzhin (Armenian: #ՄերժիրՍերժին, lit. '#RejectSerzh'), was a series of anti-government protests in Armenia from April to May 2018 staged by various political and civil groups led by a member of the Armenian parliament – Nikol Pashinyan (head of the Civil Contract party). Protests and marches took place initially in response to Serzh Sargsyan's third consecutive term as the most powerful figure in the government of Armenia, later broadening against the ruling Republican Party, who were in power since 1999. Pashinyan declared it a Velvet Revolution (Թավշյա հեղափոխություն, T'avshya heghap'vokhut'yun).

== Unsuccessful protests ==
=== Belarus ===
==== 2006 Jeans Revolution ====
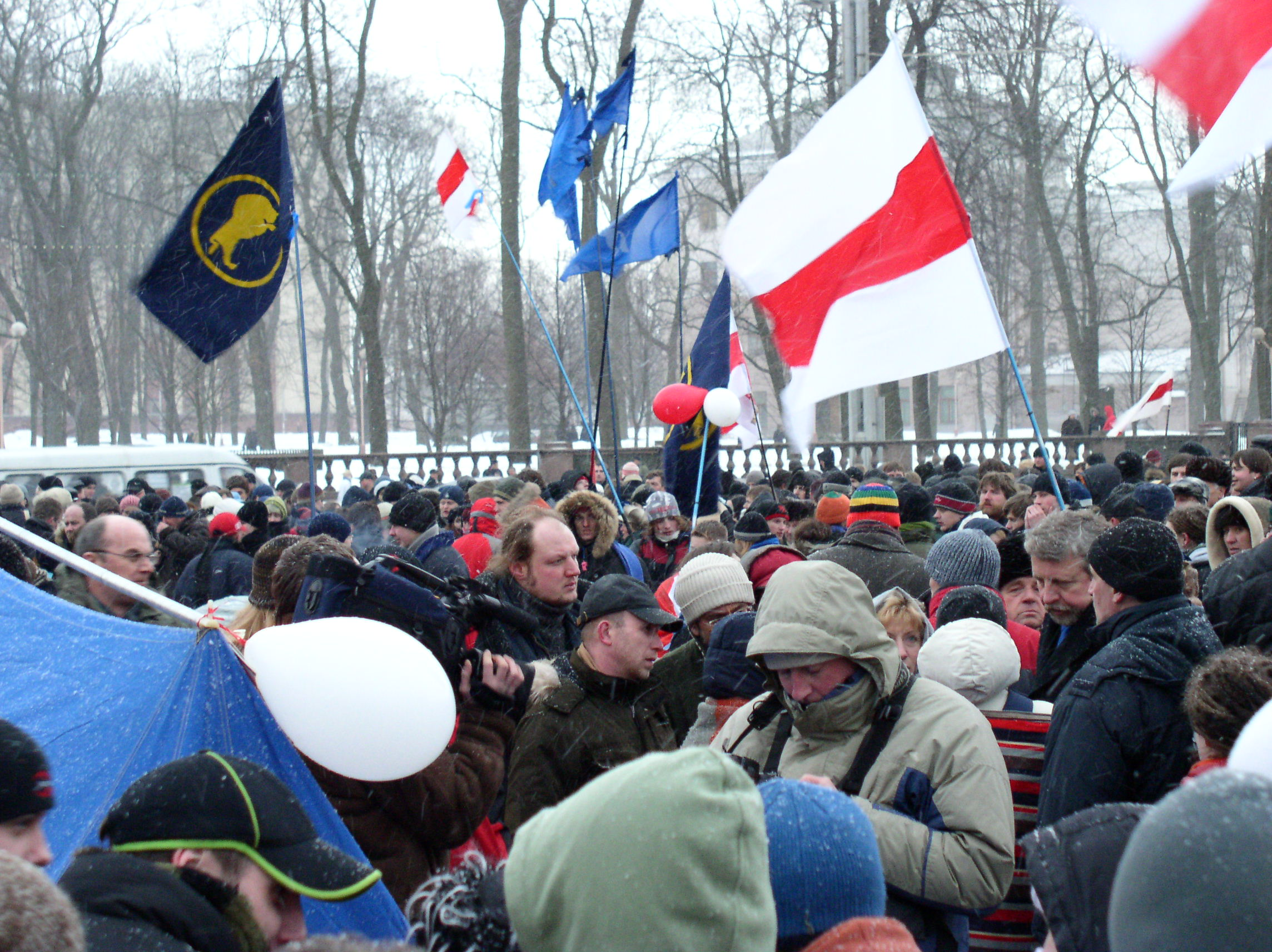
Belarusians protesting against the results of the 2006 Belarusian presidential election in Minsk during the Jeans Revolution

By March 2006, authoritarian and pro-Russian president Alexander Lukashenko had ruled Belarus for twelve years, and was aiming for a third term after term limits were cancelled by a dubious referendum in 2004 that was judged to not be free and fair internationally. Lukashenko had faced widespread international criticism for crushing dissent, neglecting human rights and restricting civil society. By this point the Belarus parliament did not contain any opposition members and acted as a "rubber stamp" parliament. Subsequently, it was after Lukashenko was declared the winner of the disputed 2006 presidential election that mass protests began against his rule.

The main challenger to Lukashenko in the election was Alexander Milinkevich, who advocated liberal democratic values and who was supported by a coalition of the major opposition parties. International observers noted intimidation and harassment of opposition campaigners including Milinkevich during the campaign, and police disrupted his election meetings on numerous occasions whilst also detaining his election agents and confiscating his campaign material. Another opposition candidate, Alyaksandr Kazulin, was beaten up by police and held for several hours, which led to international outrage. The entirety of Belarus media was controlled by Lukashenko's government and the opposition candidates had no access to it or representation on it. In the lead up to the vote, Lukashenko's regime expelled a number of foreign election observers, preventing them from overseeing the vote's standards. The regime also further limited the freedoms of independent and foreign journalists, with it being noted by analysts that Lukashenko was attempting to prevent a repeat of the popular uprisings which had ousted authoritarian governments in the Georgian and Ukrainian colour revolutions. As had previously been the case, Russia generally supported the authoritarian Belarusian authorities, with some top-level Russian officials openly declaring their wish for a Lukashenko victory. Analysts noted how it was an aim of Russia to prevent more Georgia or Ukraine-style colour revolutions, and that Russia desired to keep Lukashenko in power to prevent Belarus from turning towards the west.

Lukashenko was contentiously declared the winner of the election, with official results granting him 83% of the vote. International monitors severely criticised the legitimacy of the poll. The opposition and Milinkevich immediately called for protests. Immediately after the official results were announced, 30,000 protested in the capital of Minsk. CBS News said that this alone was "an enormous turnout in a country where police usually suppress unauthorized gatherings swiftly and brutally". Thousands of protestors then maintained a tent protest camp on October Square for several days and nights, which failed to be broken up by police and indicated that the opposition had gained a foothold. Subsequently, on Friday 24 March, riot police stormed the camp and wrestled around fifty people into trucks and detained hundreds of others. The next day, Saturday 25 March 2006, a large opposition rally took place, despite police attempting to prevent protesters gathering at October Square. Alyaksandr Kazulin was among many protesters arrested as they attempted to march on a jail where many of the democracy activists taken from the tent camp had been imprisoned. In total there were 40,000 protestors.

The opposition originally used as a symbol the white-red-white flag of Belarus prior to 1995; the movement has had significant connections with that in neighbouring Ukraine. During the Orange Revolution, some white-red-white flags were seen being waved in Kyiv. During the 2006 protests, some called it the "Jeans Revolution" or "Denim Revolution", blue jeans being considered a symbol for freedom. Some protesters cut up jeans into ribbons and hung them in public places.

Lukashenko had previously indicated his plans to crush any potential election protests, saying: "In our country, there will be no pink or orange, or even banana revolution." On 24 February 2005, he said, "They [the West] think that Belarus is ready for some 'orange' or, what is a rather frightening option, 'blue' or 'cornflower blue' revolution. Such 'blue' revolutions are the last thing we need". On 19 April 2005, he further commented: "All these coloured revolutions are pure and simple banditry."

Lukashenko later himself apparently admitted that the 2006 election was rigged, being quoted in Belarusian media as saying: "last presidential elections were rigged; I already told this to the Westerners. [...] 93.5% voted for the President Lukashenko [sic]. They said it's not a European number. We made it 86. This really happened. And if [one is to] start recounting the votes, I don't know what to do with them. Before the elections they told us that if we showed the European numbers, our elections would be accepted. We were planning to make the European numbers. But, as you can see, this didn't help either."

==== 2020 Belarusian presidential election ====
After the 2020 Belarusian presidential election, there were another wave of mass protests to challenge Lukashenko's authority. The protests started claiming fraud after incumbent president Alexander Lukashenko was re-elected. The main opposition candidate Sviatlana Tsikhanouskaya declared herself the winner, saying that she won by a large margin. She then set up the "Coordination Council", which was recognized as the legitimate interim government by the European Parliament. As of December 2020, some of the media states say that the revolution failed and that Lukashenko managed to prevent a repeat of the Euromaidan.

=== Russia ===
==== 2011–2013 protests ====
In September 2011, Russian president Dmitry Medvedev, who had ruled for four years in a more liberal direction than his predecessor Vladimir Putin, declared that Putin would run again in the upcoming presidential election. Putin had previously had to step down and make way for Medvedev to become president in 2008 due to limits on consecutive presidential terms, but the plans for his return were now made public. However, many Russians appeared to find the choreographed move to allow Medvedev and Putin to simply swap positions brazen and displeasing. In November, Putin suffered a notable humiliation when he was loudly booed by the 20,000 strong crowd when attending and speaking at a public and televised fight bout, which indicated that there was opposition to him again returning to the presidency. State TV edited out the boos to hide the opposition to him, but videos of it quickly spread online. Then, Putin's ruling party was controversially declared the winner of the parliamentary elections, despite well-documented accusations and evidence of fraud. Independent estimates showed that over a million votes may have been altered. The belief that the election had been rigged led to mass protests starting. State TV purposely ignored the protests, even after more than 1,000 arrests and the key organisers being targeted.

The protests began on 4 December 2011 in the Russian capital of Moscow against the election results, leading to the arrests of over 500 people. On 10 December, protests erupted in tens of cities across the country; a few months later, they spread to hundreds both inside the country and abroad. The protests were described as "Snow Revolution". It derives from December—the month when the revolution had started—and from the white ribbons that the protesters wore. The focus of the protests were the ruling party, United Russia, and Putin.

Protests intensified after Putin dubiously won the 2012 Russian presidential election by a preposterous margin. Video footage was discovered showing examples of vote rigging, such as an individual secretly and repeatedly feeding ballot papers into a voting machine. At a victory rally held in suspicious circumstances only minutes after polls closed and before vote-counting was even completed, Putin was seen to be showing emotion and apparently crying as he was abruptly declared the winner. With the background of the mass protests, Putin started his third term amid chaotic circumstances; he responded by becoming markedly more authoritarian, and soon further reduced human rights and civil liberties. At the time it was noted that it was possible that he would rule until 2024 when the next consecutive term limit would take effect, but in fact the constitution was changed in 2020 in controversial circumstances, which allowed him to rule until 2036 without having to step down again as he had in 2008–2012.

Boris Nemtsov, one of the leaders of the protest movement, was later assassinated with the apparent involvement of the Russian security services (and the possible involvement of Putin himself) in 2015. Another of the key leaders, Alexei Navalny, was poisoned in 2020, apparently by the FSB, and then was imprisoned in a labour colony on charges widely considered politically motivated before dying in suspicious circumstances in 2024 shortly before the presidential election, aged only 47. Vladimir Kara-Murza, another key figure in the protests, later survived suspected poisonings in 2015 and 2017 before being imprisoned for 25 years on charges widely considered politically motivated in 2022. Ilya Yashin, another key leader of the protests, was likewise another figure convicted on politically-motivated charges after Russia's 2022 invasion of Ukraine. Protest figure Dmitry Bykov was also poisoned in 2019, having been trailed by the same FSB agents who poisoned Navalny in 2020.

== Opposition ==
International geopolitics scholars Paul J. Bolt and Sharyl N. Cross state that "Moscow and Beijing share almost indistinguishable views on the potential domestic and international security threats posed by colored revolutions, and both nations view these revolutionary movements as being orchestrated by the United States and its Western democratic partners to advance geopolitical ambitions."

=== In Russia ===
According to Anthony Cordesman of the Center for Strategic and International Studies, Russian military leaders view the "colour revolutions" (Russian: «цветные революции», romanized: tsvetnye revolyutsii) as a "new US and European approach to warfare that focuses on creating destabilizing revolutions in other states as a means of serving their security interests at low cost and with minimal casualties."

Government figures in Russia, such as Defence Minister Sergei Shoigu (in office from 2012 to 2024) and Foreign Minister Sergei Lavrov (in office from 2004), have characterized colour revolutions as externally-fuelled acts with a clear goal of influencing the internal affairs that destabilize the economy, conflict with the law and represent a new form of warfare. Russian President Vladimir Putin stated in November 2014 that Russia must prevent any colour revolutions in Russia: "We see what tragic consequences the wave of so-called colour revolutions led to. For us, this is a lesson and a warning. We should do everything necessary so that nothing similar ever happens in Russia". In December 2023 Putin stated that "the so-called color revolutions" had "been used by the Western elites in many world regions more than once" as "methods of such destabilization". He added "But these scenarios have failed to work and I am convinced will never work in Russia, a free, independent and sovereign state."

The 2015 presidential decree The Russian Federation's National Security Strategy (Russian: О Стратегии Национальной Безопасности Российской Федерации) cites foreign-sponsored regime change among "main threats to public and national security" including:

the activities of radical public associations and groups using nationalist and religious extremist ideology, foreign and international non-governmental organizations, and financial and economic structures, and also individuals, focused on destroying the unity and territorial integrity of the Russian Federation, destabilizing the domestic political and social situation—including through inciting "color revolutions"—and destroying traditional Russian religious and moral values.

In the aftermath of the colour revolutions, the term "colour revolution" has been used as a pejorative term to refer to protests which are believed to be a result of influence by foreign countries. Euromaidan, the 2018 Armenian revolution, the 2019 protests in Georgia, the 2019–2020 Hong Kong protests, and the 2020–2021 Belarusian protests have been described by pro-Kremlin outlets as being "colour revolutions" aimed at destabilising the respective governments of each country.

=== In China ===
Motivated in part by its desire to prevent colour revolutions, in 2009, the People's Republic of China banned YouTube, Twitter, and Facebook.

The 2015 policy white paper "China's Military Strategy" (中国的军事战略) by the State Council Information Office said that "anti-China forces have never given up their attempt to instigate a 'color revolution' in this country."

In 2018, General Secretary of the Chinese Communist Party Xi Jinping accused unnamed foreign forces of attempting to plot a colour revolution.

In September 2022, at a summit of the Shanghai Cooperation Organisation, Xi Jinping stated that the group must prevent "external forces" from promoting colour revolutions.

== Pattern of revolution ==
Michael McFaul identified seven stages of successful political revolutions common in colour revolutions:

1. A semi-autocratic rather than fully autocratic regime
2. An unpopular incumbent
3. A united and organized opposition
4. An ability to quickly drive home the point that voting results were falsified
5. Enough independent media to inform citizens about the falsified vote
6. A political opposition capable of mobilizing tens of thousands or more demonstrators to protest electoral fraud
7. Divisions among the regime's coercive forces

== See also ==
- People power
- Civil resistance
- Revolutions of 1989
- Arab Spring
- Spring (political terminology)
- United States involvement in regime change
- Post-Soviet conflicts
