= Aigul Japarova =

First Lady of Kyrgyzstan

- Айгүл Жапарова
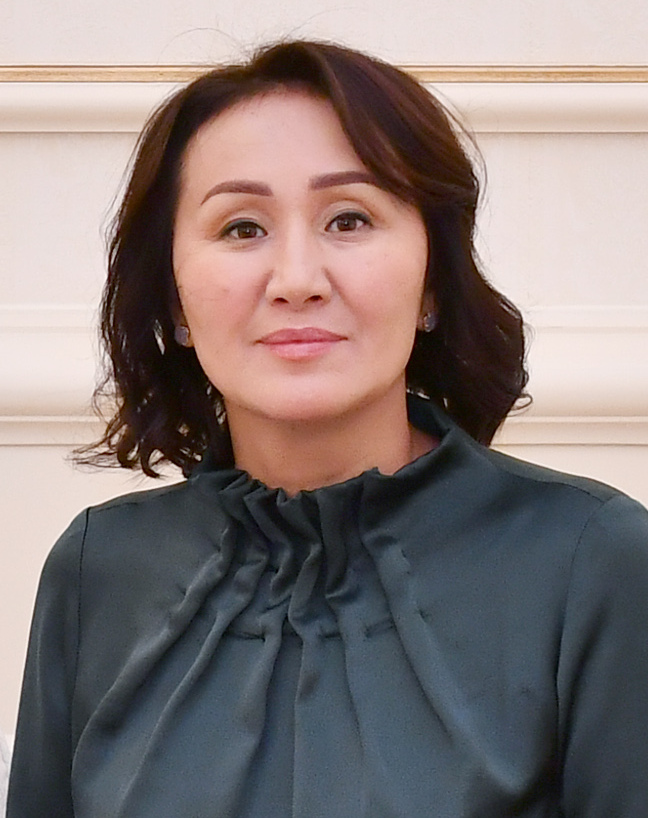
- Japarova in 2022

First Lady of Kyrgyzstan
- Current
- Assumed role 28 January 2021
- President: Sadyr Japarov
- Preceded by: Aigul Jeenbekova

Personal details
- Born: Aigul Asanbaeva (Айгүл Асанбаева); November 14, 1973 (age 52) Tüp District, Issyk-Kul Region, Kyrgyz SSR, Soviet Union
- Spouse: Sadyr Japarov (m. 1991)
- Education: Arabaev Kyrgyz State University

Aigul Japarovna Japarova (Note: Kyrgyz: Айгүл Жапаровна Жапарова) (née Asanbaeva; born 14 November 1973) is the wife of President Sadyr Japarov and the incumbent First Lady of Kyrgyzstan.

== Biography ==
She was born in a village in the Tüp District on 14 November 1973. She studied at a medical school, then received a higher education at the Arabaev Kyrgyz State University. Asanbayeva lived with her children abroad for three years during her husband's exile, mainly in Poland and Russia. In an interview, she claimed that she turned to President Almazbek Atambayev's wife, Raisa, for help, when her husband and son were detained by the security forces at the Kyrgyz border. She and Japarov are the parents of four children, one of whom died on 26 August 2019 in an accident.

== Tenure as First Lady ==
During her husband's acting presidency, she volunteered to help volunteers in the fight against the COVID-19 pandemic in Kyrgyzstan. In June 2021, she joined her husband on his official visit to Turkey in her first such foreign trip.

== Perception ==
She has been compared to Mayram Akayeva, the wife of the first president Askar Akayev. It has also been noted that her father has been working at the Kumtor Gold Mine for many years, a place which Japarov for many years has advocated for its nationalization.
