= KelKel =

Kyrgyzstan political youth organization

KelKel is a youth movement in Kyrgyzstan that gained some prominence during the Tulip Revolution of March 2005 that culminated in the ousting of President Askar Akayev. In Kyrgyz, KelKel means renaissance.

In many of the post-communist revolutions, youth groups were at the forefront of protests. The most famous of these was Otpor!, the young people's movement that helped oust Slobodan Milošević in Serbia. In Georgia the movement was called Kmara. In the Ukrainian Orange Revolution, the movement worked under the slogan 'PORA'— "It's Time"; KelKel is based on these movements.

In an attempt to create confusion, a rival group was formed, presumably by supporters of President Akayev. This group was also called KelKel and used the same yellow logo as the original group. The rival KelKel disappeared after the revolution of 24 March, 2005. At present, KelKel is a registered youth organization - "KelKel: civil youth movement" - that aims to be an active but non-partisan part of civil society and a participant in public debate and strategic discussions.

== See also ==
- Tulip Revolution
- Kyrgyz parliamentary elections, 2005
