= Maxim Bakiyev =

Kyrgyz politician (born 1977)

- Максим Бакиев
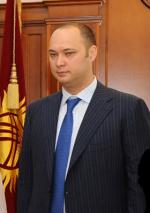

Director of the Central Agency for Development, Investment and Innovation of the Kyrgyz Republic
- In office 29 October 2009 – 7 April 2010
- Preceded by: Post established
- Succeeded by: Post abolished

Personal details
- Born: 27 August 1977 (age 49) Samara, Russian SFSR, USSR
- Spouse: Kenenbaeva Aizhan
- Parent(s): Kurmanbek Bakiyev; Tatyana Petrova
- Profession: Politician

Maksim Kurmanbekovich Bakiyev (also referred to as Bakiev) (Russian: Максим Курманбекович Бакиев; born 27 October 1977), is a Kyrgyz politician, the youngest son of former president of Kyrgyzstan, Kurmanbek Bakiyev, from his marriage to Russian-born Tatyana Petrova. He is a resident of the UK having been granted political asylum.

== Biography ==
=== Early life ===
Maksim Bakiyev has a legal background, having graduated from the joint Kyrgyz-Russian Slavic University. As a student, Maksim worked in a consulting firm, specialized in investment into emerging markets in Central Asia and the Middle East.

=== Career ===
Maksim was appointed the head of the Central Agency for Development in October 2009. Since the 2010 overthrow he has been charged with embezzlement and abuse of power by the interim government of Kyrgyzstan. It is suspected that he transferred about $35 million of a $300 million loan from Russia into his private bank accounts. Prosecutors also alleged that his companies owed almost $80 million in taxes on aviation fuel sales. A civil fraud claim regarding this was brought in the UK High Court and was withdrawn by two Kygrz Republic agencies in October 2016, and he has no charges for fraud against him.

During the 2010 uprising in Kyrgyzstan, Maxim Bakiyev was headed to the US for a series of meetings in Washington. However, he never showed up. In May Interpol posted Maxim Bakiyev as wanted on its website. In 2016, following the successful dismissal of all fraud and criminal charges against Maxim Bakiev, Interpol withdrew its red notice against Mr Bakiev.

== Arrest and asylum ==
On 13 June 2010, Maksim was arrested in the UK when he landed at Farnborough Airport in Hampshire in a privately hired jet. He sought asylum there but the interim government demanded his extradition at the time. A senior Kyrgyz official warned that the interim government would consider shutting down the U.S. Manas airbase if Britain refuses to hand him over. However, this was later denounced by president of Kyrgyzstan, Roza Otunbayeva. Bakiyev was granted temporary political asylum in the UK.

On 12 October 2012, Bakiyev was arrested in London by UK extradition officers on the request of U.S. authorities, who want to question him for alleged involvement in fraud. In a statement, the Kyrgyz presidency declared: "Because of the absence of an extradition agreement between the Kyrgyz Republic and Great Britain, the British side is now considering the issue of extraditing Maxim Bakiyev to the United States."

On 27 March 2013, a Kyrgyz court sentenced Bakiyev in absentia to 25 years in prison for corruption.

In May 2013, a US criminal securities fraud case against him was dismissed.

In March 2015 Global Witness reported that Bakiev lives in a £3.5 million Surrey mansion in the UK and may be eligible for permanent residency in June 2015, with UK citizenship in June 2016.

In 2016 a personal injury claim against Maxim Bakiev was brought by British businessman Mr Sean Daley, alleging that his shooting and attempted murder in Bishkek had been organized and arranged by Mr Bakiev, was dismissed at the High Court of Justice in London as not "credible", "unsatisfactory" and "wholly implausible". Evidence submitted was stated by Mr Justice Supperstone to give "rise to real concern that it was made in collaboration with Mr Ismailov (the Kyrgyz prosecutor) for the purpose of ensuring the conviction of Mr Bakiev.

== 2010 South Kyrgyzstan unrest ==
In May 2010, an audio recording was posted anonymously on YouTube with a caption identifying the voices as those of Maxim and his uncle Janish Bakiyev. The men were discussing plans to arm groups to spread chaos across the south of Kyrgyzstan, sometime in June. Both men have denied the authenticity of the tape and Bakiyev has repeatedly said he has no involvement in the violence.

Kyrgyz Deputy Prime Minister Almazbek Atambayev, claims that the 2010 inter-ethnic riots in south Kyrgyzstan were paid for with $10 million from Bakiyev's pocket.
