= Janish Bakiyev =

Kyrgyzstani politician

Janysh Bakiyev (Kyrgyz: Жаныш Салиевич Бакиев, Zhanysh Saliyevich Baqiyev; born on March 16, 1958, in the Suzak District) is the former chief of the State Protection Service of Kyrgyzstan and brother of former president Kurmanbek Bakiyev.

In September 2006, Janybek resigned from his senior intelligence after being implicated in planting heroin in the luggage of the main opposition leader, Omurbek Tekebayev, who was later detained in Poland.

In the summer of 2008 his son Asylbek Saliev successfully sued two independent newspapers 'De Facto' and 'Alibi' for libel after they published an article alleging he was involved in a traffic accident that resulted in the death of a pedestrian. Saliev was awarded one million soms (approximately US$35,000) from each in compensation.

Kyrgyz politicians have regularly accused Janysh Bakiyev of manipulating the law enforcement agencies' illegal operations against the opposition and being the strong hand for his president brother.

In May 2010, an audio recording was posted anonymously on YouTube with a caption identifying the voices as those of Janish and Maxim Bakiyev, the former president's son. The men were discussing plans to arm groups to spread chaos across the south of Kyrgyzstan, sometime in June. Both men have denied the authenticity of the tape.

Janish Bakiyev is wanted by the new government, and it is claimed that he, as head of the State Protection Service, authorized the firing that killed dozens of protesters during the 2010 Kyrgyzstani uprising as well as authorizing the contract killing of Medet Sadyrkulov, former presidential chief of staff. Janish stated in an interview with the Azerbaijani Press Agency on April 19, 2010, that he will not surrender to the interim government. Along with other members of the Bakiyev clan, Janish is currently living in Belarus, whence the authorities are refusing to extradite him.
