= State Secretary of Kyrgyzstan =

State Secretary of the Kyrgyz Republic Кыргыз Республикасынын мамлекеттик катчысы
- Incumbent; Arslan Koichiev since 1 December 2025
- Presidential Administration of Kyrgyzstan
- Style: Mister Secretary
- Reports to: President of Kyrgyzstan
- Residence: Bishkek, Kyrgyzstan
- Seat: Bishkek
- Nominator: The president
- Appointer: President
- Inaugural holder: Esenbek Duysheev
- Formation: 1991 (first iteration); 5 May 2021 (second iteration)

The state secretary or secretary of state of the Kyrgyz Republic (Kyrgyz: Кыргыз Республикасынын мамлекеттик катчысы) is an appointed post under the direct supervision of the president of Kyrgyzstan.

== History ==
It was founded in 1991 as the secretary of state of the Cabinet of Ministers of Kyrgyzstan. On 5 May 2021, with the introduction of the new constitution, the office of state secretary was re-established for the first time since 2009.

As of 2026 the post is held by Arslan Koichiev. Formerly a BBC producer and newsreader, Koichiev resigned after claims he helped foment a revolution in Kyrgyzstan. He replaced Marat Imankulov on 1 December 2025.

== Role ==
The state counsellor develops proposals for the president on domestic and foreign policy and coordinates activities on social and cultural issues. It also conducts the following, on behalf of the president:

- The implementation of programs and projects on issues of interethnic and interfaith unity.
- Organizes an analysis of the state, trends in the cultural and spiritual development of society.
- Develops proposals for improving education and developing science, culture and art.
- Protecting the country's historical and cultural heritage.
- Interacts with public institutions and the media on various issues of state and public life.
- Coordinates work with regional leaders.

== List of state secretaries ==
- Esenbek Duysheev (1991)
- Tursunbek Chingyshev (1991–1992)
- Zhanysh Rustenbekov (1993 - 1995)
- Jumabek Ibraimov (1995–1996)
- Osmonakun Ibraimov (2000–2005)
- Adakhan Madumarov (2006–2007)
- Cholponbek Abykeev (2 July – 12 October 2021)
- Suyunbek Kasmambetov (12 October 2021 – 15 May 2025)
- Marat Imankulov (15 May 2025 – 1 December 2022)
- Arslan Koichiev (1 December 2025 - )
