= Kyrgyz-Russian Slavic University =

University in Bishkek, Kyrgyzstan

- Киргизско-Российский Славянский университет имени Бориса Ельцина
- Other name: KRSU
- Established: 1992
- Rector: Sergey Volkov
- Students: 11,000
- Location: Bishkek, Kyrgyzstan
- Campus: Urban
- Website: Kyrgyz Russian Slavic University

Kyrgyz-Russian Slavic University named after Boris Yeltsin (Russian: Кыргызско-Российский Славянский университет имени Бориса Ельцина, romanized: Kyrgyzsko-Rossiyskiy Slavyanskiy universitet imeni Borisa Yeltsina) is a university which is jointly operated by the Kyrgyz government and the Government of Russia, located in city of Bishkek, the capital of Kyrgyzstan.

== History ==
The KRSU was established in 1992. Kyrgyz-Russian Slavic University was founded in 1993 in accordance with the Treaty of Friendship, Cooperation and Mutual Assistance between the Kyrgyz Republic and the Russian Federation, which was signed on June 10, 1992, in Moscow. By February 1994, the school's regulations were enshrined into law by the governments of Russia and Kyrgyzstan. On February 14 of that year, the State Committee of the Russian Federation for Higher Education and the Ministry of Education and Science of the Kyrgyz Republic jointly established the Kyrgyz-Russian Slavic University. Since its establishment, the university has been cooperating with the Yeltsin Foundation that remains a trusted partner up to the present day. The foundation has been providing financial support to the university such as grants for 50 students in the KRSU, as well as money for the improvement of university equipment. Knowing this, in 2004, by the decree of Kyrgyz President Askar Akayev, the university was named after Boris Yeltsin as a sign of respect to the former president of Russia in his support and encouragement in establishing the KRSU.

== Awards ==
- Order Dostyk - Presented by PM Sapar Isakov to the rector of the university Vladimir Nifadiev - August 30, 2017)
- Gratitude of the president of the Russian Federation - June 29, 2018
- Gratitude of the president of the Russian Federation - September 5, 2003.

== International cooperation ==
Today, the KRSU has close links with the following universities and research institutes of Europe, Asia and America:

- Moscow State University
- Moscow State Technical University
- Diplomatic Academy of the Ministry of Foreign Affairs of the Russian Federation
- Moscow State Institute of Foreign Relations
- Plekhanov Russian University of Economics
- Russian State University for the Humanities
- Kyrgyz Academy of Sciences
- Westminster University
- National Technical University of Athens
- Eindhoven University of Technology
- Lanzhou University
- Kwangju Ecological College
- Plymouth University
- Newcastle University
- University of Gothenburg

== Notable alumni ==
- Bermet Borubaeva, artist and activist.
- Sadyr Japarov, incumbent president of Kyrgyzstan.
- Maxim Bakiyev, the youngest son of former president of Kyrgyzstan, Kurmanbek Bakiyev.
- Baktygul Jeenbekova, daughter of a former president Sooronbay Jeenbekov and Aigul Jeenbekova.
