= Medet Sadyrkulov =

Kyrgyz politician

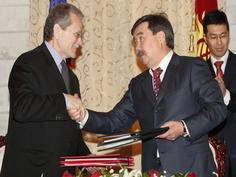

Medet Sadyrkulov (Kyrgyz: Медет Садыркулов, Medet Sadırqulov; December 13, 1953–March 13, 2009) was a Kyrgyz politician and former chief of staff for presidents Askar Akayev and Kurmanbek Bakiyev. He was also Kyrgyzstan's ambassador to Iran from 2000 to 2005. In January 2009 he stepped down from his post with the Bakiyev administration, refusing an offer to become Foreign Minister of Kyrgyzstan, and became active in opposition politics.

Sadyrkulov was killed along with his driver and one other companion at about 5 a.m. on March 13, 2009 in what the government claimed was an accidental car crash. In September 2011 an arrest warrant was issued against Janish Bakiyev, brother of the former President and former head of the presidential guard, for the contract killing of Sadyrkulov. Along with other members of the Bakiyev clan, Janish is currently living in Belarus, whence the authorities are refusing to extradite him. Sadyrkulov was on his way back to the Kyrgyz capital, Bishkek from neighboring Kazakhstan, where he had been mustering support for opposition to the government. Sadyrkulov was 55.
