= Jeenbekov =

Jeenbekov is a masculine surname, its feminine counterpart is Jeenbekova. Notable people with the surname include:

- Aigul Jeenbekova, First Lady of Kyrgyzstan
- Asylbek Jêênbekov (born 1963), Kyrgyz politician
- Sooronbay Jeenbekov (born 1958), Kyrgyz politician, elected President of Kyrgyzstan
