= State Security Service (Kyrgyzstan) =

Protective service agency of Kyrgyzstan

State Security Service of the Kyrgyz Republic
- Mамлекеттик Kоопсуздук Kызматы (Kyrgyz)

Agency overview
- Formed: 10 February 2026
- Preceding agency: 9th Service of the State Committee for National Security
- Jurisdiction: President of Kyrgyzstan
- Headquarters: Bishkek, Kyrgyzstan
- Agency executive: Syrgak Berdikozhoyev, Chairman of the State Security Service

The State Security Service (Kyrgyz: мамлекеттик коопсуздук кызматы) is a protective service agency under the President of Kyrgyzstan.

== History ==
The Ninth Chief Directorate of the KGB of the Kirghiz Soviet Socialist Republic (the republic branch of the union KGB) was responsible for the protection of high-ranking Communist Party of Kirghizia (CPSU) members and important government facilities. Modelled on its national counterpart, it consisted of uniformed troops that provided bodyguard services to the republic's leadership and their families.

Post independence, the State Security Service (former State Protection Service) was established. Post the 2010 Kyrgyz Revolution, it was incorporated into the State Committee for National Security, where it became the 9th Service of the State Committee for National Security. The main task of the 9th Service was to ensure security of top officials of the state. On 10 February 2026, President Sadyr Japarov signed an order on the establishment of the State Security Service. This was part of a broader shift in the GKNB following the removal of Kamchybek Tashiev as its chairman and Deputy Chairman of the Cabinet of Ministers of the Kyrgyz Republic, as well as the removal of the State Border Guard Service from the GKNB and its transfer to the Security Council of Kyrgyzstan.

== Role ==
The State Security Service, together with the National Guard of Kyrgyzstan is responsible for the Ala Archa State Residence.

== Leaders ==
=== Head of the State Protection Service ===
- Janish Bakiyev (June 2008 - Chief of the State Security Service of the Kyrgyz Republic.

=== Head of the 9th Service of the State Committee for National Security ===
- Zamir Sabaev (January 23, 2013 - May 27, 2015)
- Bolot Suyunbaev (May 27, 2015 - June 1, 2016)
- Damir Musakeev (June 1, 2016 - April 4, 2018)
- Toktosun Sabyrov (April 6, 2018 - 2 March 2019)
- Colonel Timur Shabdanbekov (2 March 2019 - 7 December 2019)
- Colonel Sanzhar Erkinbaev (7 December 2019)
- Major General Zhumgalbek Shabdanbekov (19 October 2020 - 10 February 2026)

=== Chairman of the State Security Service ===
- Syrgak Berdikozhoyev (since 10 February 2026)

== See also ==
- Special State Protection Service of Azerbaijan
- Federal Protective Service (Russia)
- Federal Protective Service (United States)
- Presidential Security Service (Belarus)
