= First ladies and gentlemen of Kyrgyzstan =

Political title

First Lady of Kyrgyzstan

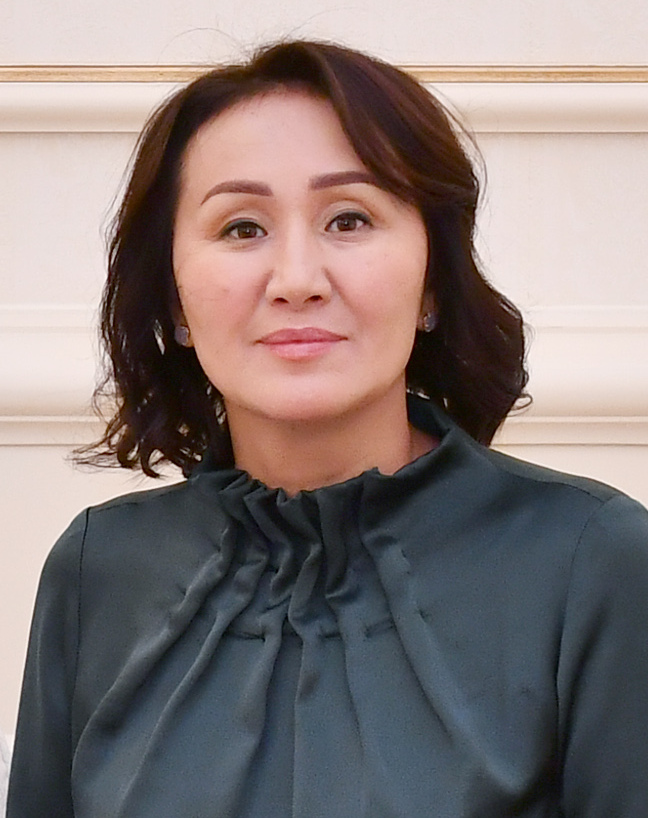
- Incumbent; Aigul Japarova since 28 January 2021
- Inaugural holder: Mayram Akayeva
- Formation: October 27, 1990

First Lady (Kyrgyz: биринчи айым, romanized: birinçi ayım) or First Gentleman of Kyrgyzstan is the title attributed to the spouse of the president of Kyrgyzstan. The current first lady is Aigul Japarova, the wife of President Sadyr Japarov. To date, there has been no official first gentleman of Kyrgyzstan. The country's first female president, Roza Otunbayeva, was divorced during her presidency.

== First ladies of Kyrgyzstan ==
No.	Name	Term begins	Term ends	President of Kyrgyzstan	Notes	Photo
1	Mayram Akayeva	October 27, 1990	March 24, 2005	Askar Akayev		
2	Tatyana Bakiyeva	March 25, 2005	April 15, 2010	Kurmanbek Bakiyev		
-	position vacant	April 7, 2010	December 1, 2011	Roza Otunbayeva	Otunbayeva divorced Bolot Otunbaev in 1997. The position of First Gentleman remained vacant during her tenure.	
4	Raisa Atambayeva	December 1, 2011	November 24, 2017	Almazbek Atambayev		
5	Aigul Jeenbekova	November 24, 2017	October 15, 2020	Sooronbay Jeenbekov		
6	Aigul Japarova	January 28, 2021	Incumbent	Sadyr Japarov		

== See also ==
- President of Kyrgyzstan
