= Bermet Akayeva =

Kyrgyz politician and former MP

Bermet Akayeva Бермет Акаева

Member of Parliament
- In office April 14, 2005 – May 16, 2005

Personal details
- Born: June 3, 1972 (age 53) Leningrad, Russian SFSR, Soviet Union (now Saint Petersburg, Russia)
- Party: Forward Kyrgyzstan Party
- Parent(s): Askar Akayev; Mayram Akayeva

Bermet Askarevna Akayeva (Kyrgyz: Бермет Аскаревна Акаева; born June 3, 1972, in Leningrad) is a Kyrgyz politician and former MP. She is the daughter of ousted former President of Kyrgyzstan Askar Akayev. She graduated from the Frunze physics and mathematics school in 1989, studied at the Faculty of Computational Mathematics and Cybernetics, Moscow State University from 1989 to 1992 and at the Business School of Lausanne from 1992 to 1994. After receiving her MBA in 1994 she worked in the United Nations Compensation Commission in Geneva as a legal assistant. In 2000, she moved to Kyrgyzstan and became involved in business there.

Bermet Akayeva ran for Parliament during the 2005 legislative election. Roza Otunbayeva, a leading opposition figure, was deregistered from the same district where Akayeva was running. The 'Alga, Kyrgyzstan' Party led by Akayeva was accused of numerous machinations and falsifications during the elections. After fleeing during the Tulip Revolution, Bermet Akayeva returned to the Parliament on April 14, 2005, meeting a protest of around 100 people. They accused her of attempting to stir up tensions within the nation. However, Edil Baisalov of the Coalition for Democracy and Civil Society said her return demonstrated that she was ready to take "responsibility for numerous machinations, political as well as economic, which turned the fate of our country into a playground for the Akayev family." Bolotbek Maripov, who lost to Akayeva in a disputed parliament seat, said that her return showed courage. "I'm glad that there's at least one man in the Akayev family," he added. However, on May 16 her mandate was revoked by the Central Election Commission of Kyrgyzstan. They had undertaken an investigation into voting in Akayeva's district and ruled that the elections in the area were illegitimate.

In early August 2007, Akayeva, who had won a parliamentary mandate in by-elections in Kemin, was charged with "obstruction of justice, contempt of court, and stealing, destroying, damaging or concealing documents, stamps or seals" in connection with rioting that occurred in Chuy Province in the north of the country in April 2007.
