= Tatyana Bakiyeva =

First Lady of Kyrgyzstan from 2005 to 2010

- Татьяна Бакиева
- Bakiyeva in 2005

First Lady of Kyrgyzstan
- In role 25 March 2005 – 15 April 2010
- President: Kurmanbek Bakiyev
- Preceded by: Mayram Akayeva
- Succeeded by: Amiya Sadybakasova (daughter of President)

Personal details
- Born: Tatyana Vasilevna Petrova; 26 January, late-1940s Samara, RSFSR, Soviet Union
- Spouse: Kurmanbek Bakiyev (m. 1970)
- Children: 2, including Maxim

Tatyana Vasilevna Bakiyeva (Russian: Татьяна Васильевна Бакиева; née Petrova; born on 26 January, late-1940s) is a Kyrgyzstani public figure who is married to former President of Kyrgyzstan, Kurmanbek Bakiyev and the First Lady of Kyrgyzstan from March 2005 to April 2010.

== Early life ==
Russian by ethnicity, she was born in Kuybyshev (now Samara) in the RSFSR and was raised in the Moldovan SSR (now Moldova). She eventually moved back to Samara and studied at the Kuybyshev Polytechnical Institute. She began her career in 1971 working at large industrial enterprises such as the production association "ZIM" in Samara. It was in Samara, where she met her husband Kurmanbek Bakiyev, who was studying at her alma-mater. When she originally told her parents about her relationship with Bakiyev, they questioned her over why she would be engaged with someone of Kyrgyz ethnicity over an ethnic Russian. They eventually married in 1970 and had their sons Marat and Maxim in the city 2 and 7 years later respectively.

== Life in Kyrgyzstan ==
In 1979, her whole family moved to Bakiev's native Kyrgyzstan and settled down in Jalal-Abad. For a short period of time, she headed the Chui Regional Branch of the Meerim Foundation, which her predecessor Mayram Akayeva, founded. After the 2005 Tulip Revolution, her husband became president and she became first lady. While she was first lady, she showed minimal activity, limiting herself to accompanying Bakiyev at official meetings and various government events. She has not been seen since the Kyrgyz Revolution of 2010, with her husband going into exile in Minsk with his 2 sons and Kyrgyz mistress Nazgul Tolomusheva. Besides the Russian language, which is Bakiyeva's native language, she is also conversant in the Kyrgyz language.
