= Anti-Corruption Business Council =

Advisory body in the Kyrgyz Republic

- Коррупцияга каршы күрөшүү боюнча ишкер кеңеш

Agency overview
- Formed: July 8, 2021
- Jurisdiction: Government of Kyrgyzstan
- Headquarters: Bishkek, Kyrgyzstan
- Employees: 43
- Agency executives: Sadyr Japarov, Chairman; Nuruipa Mukanova, Secretary General
- Parent agency: Presidential Administration of Kyrgyzstan
- Key document: Anti-Corruption Policy Strategy
- Website: Website

The Anti-Corruption Business Council (Kyrgyz: Коррупцияга каршы күрөшүү боюнча ишкер кеңеш) is an advisory body under the President of Kyrgyzstan to facilitate dialogue between the public sector, the business community, and civil society in combating corruption in Kyrgyzstan.

== Overview ==
The Anti-Corruption Business Council was established on July 8, 2021, by decree signed by of newly elected Kyrgyz president Sadyr Japarov. Its membership includes representatives of prominent business associations and leaders of industry, as well as activists within civil society, academic experts and the heads of relevant government agencies. It heavily coordinates and cooperated with the OSCE Programme Office in Bishkek.
