= Raisa Atambayeva =

Former First Lady of Kyrgyzstan

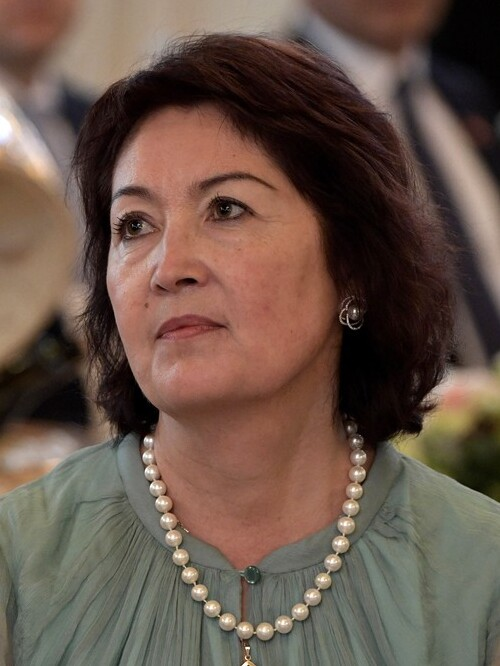
- Atambayeva in 2017

First Lady of Kyrgyzstan
- In role 1 December 2011 – 24 November 2017
- President: Almazbek Atambayev
- Preceded by: Amiya Sadybakasova (daughter of President)
- Succeeded by: Aigul Tokoyeva

Personal details
- Born: 25 June 1959 (age 67) Tatar ASSR, RSFSR, Soviet Union
- Spouse: Almazbek Atambayev
- Children: 2
- Profession: Doctor

Raisa Minakhmedovna Atambayeva (Russian: Раиса Минахмедовна Атамбаева; born 25 June 1959) is the wife of the former President of Kyrgyzstan Almazbek Atambayev and First Lady of Kyrgyzstan from 2011 to 2017. She is an ethnic Tatar and was born in the Tatar Autonomous Soviet Socialist Republic. She is a doctor.

== Early life and career ==
She was born on 25 June 1959 in the Urals of the Russian SFSR. During the Soviet era, she moved with her parents to Osh, Kyrgyz SSR. Here she graduated from the secondary school named after Lomonosov, where she learned English and Kyrgyz. Atambaeva is a candidate of medical sciences.

== Personal life ==
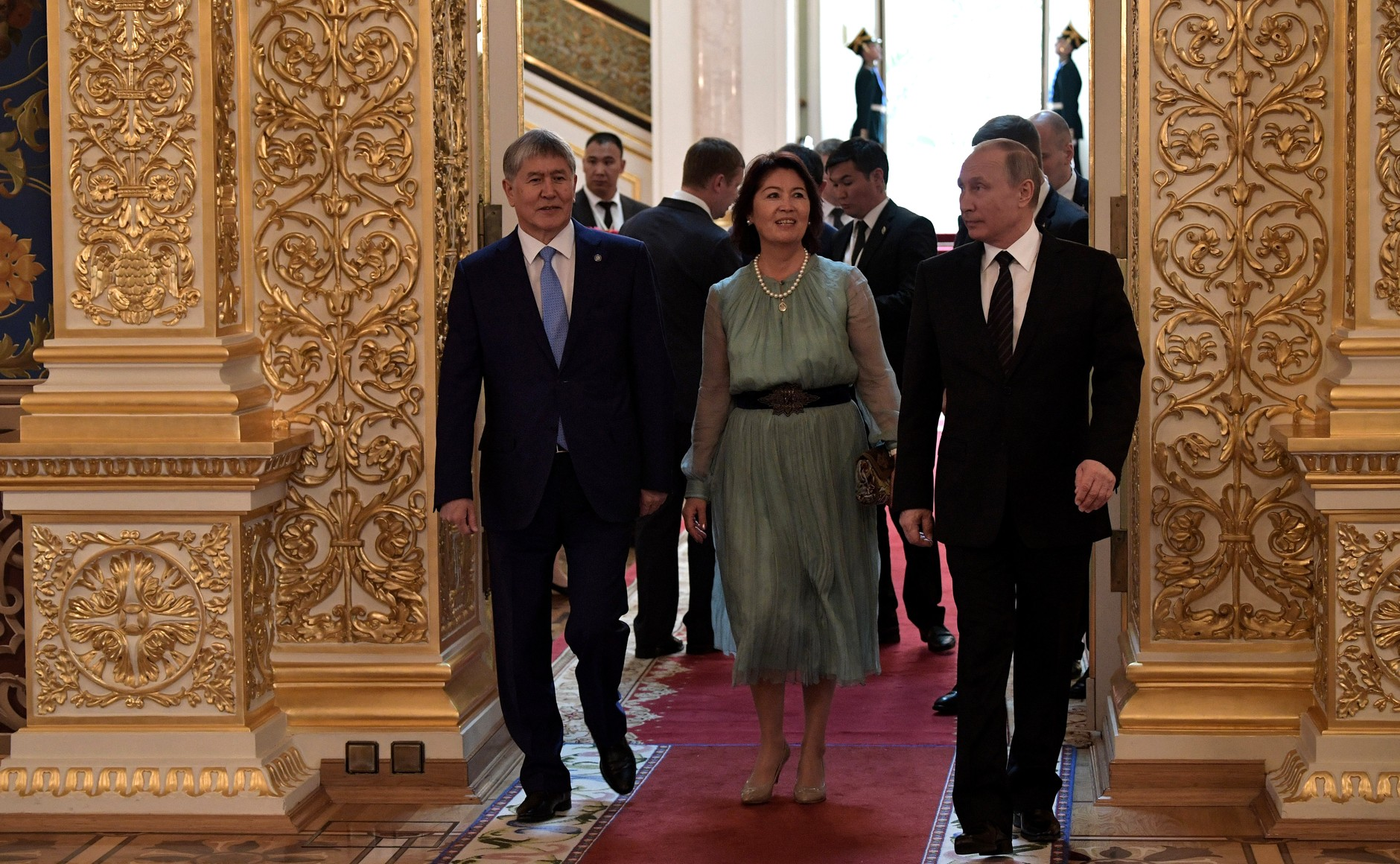
Raisa with her husband Almazbek Atambayev and Russian president Vladimir Putin in the Kremlin in 2017.

She is married to Almazbek Atambayev. She has 2 children with Atambayev, a boy Khadyrbek and a girl Aliya.
