= Presidential Administration of Kyrgyzstan =

Presidential Administration
- Президенттик Администрациясы
- Coat of arms of Kyrgyzstan

- Yntymak Ordo in central Bishkek.

Agency overview
- Formed: 1991
- Jurisdiction: Government of Kyrgyzstan
- Headquarters: Yntymak Ordo, 301 Chyngyz Aitmatov Street, Bishkek, Kyrgyzstan
- Agency executive: Adylbek Kasymaliev, Head of the Presidential Administration
- Website: president.kg

The Presidential Administration of Kyrgyzstan (Kyrgyz: Кыргызстандын Президенттик Администрациясы, romanized: Kırgızstandın Prezidenttik Administratsiyası, Russian: Администрация Президента Кыргызстана, romanized: Administratsiya Prezidenta Kyrgyzstana) is a standing advisory body set up by the President of the Kyrgyz Republic. The administration is currently led by Adylbek Kasymaliev, simultaneously the Chairman of the Cabinet of Ministers of Kyrgyzstan since 2024.

== Heads of the Administration ==
- Zhanysh Rustenbekov (1993 - 1995) (concurrently State Secretary of Kyrgyzstan)
- Medet Sadyrkulov (1999)
- Misir Ashirkulov (1999-March 7, 2001)
- Misir Ashirkulov (July 19, 2002-February 7, 2004)
- Toychubek Kasymov (7 February 2004 - March 2005)
- Usen Sydykov (March 2005 – May 2006)
- Myktybek Abdyldayev (May 2006 – April 16, 2007)
- Medet Sadyrkulov (April 16, 2007 – January 8, 2009)
- Kanybek Zhoroyev (October 26, 2009 - April 29, 2010)
- Daniyar Narymbayev (October 19, 2012 - July 20, 2015)
- Temir Dzhumakadyrov (July 20, 2015 - October 7, 2015)
- Farid Niyazov (October 7, 2015 - March 1, 2017)
- Sapar Isakov (March 1, 2017 - August 26, 2017)
- Almazbek Usenov (August 26, 2017 - March 16, 2018)
- Mukhammedkalyi Abylgaziev (March 16, 2018 - August 17, 2018)
- Dosaly Esenaliev (August 17, 2018 - October 13, 2021)
- Akylbek Japarov (October 13, 2021 – December 16, 2024)
- Adylbek Kasymaliev (16 December 2024 – Present)

== Structure ==
=== Leading Personnel ===
- Chairman of the Cabinet of Ministers - Head of the Presidential Administration
- Deputy Chief of Staff of the Presidential Administration - Deputy Head of the Department for Preparing Decisions of the President and the Cabinet of Ministers
- State Secretary of Kyrgyzstan
- Advisor to the President
- Advisor to the President
- Advisor to the President
- Assistant to the President
- Special Representative on the Mountain Agenda
- Commissioner for Children's Rights
- Press Secretary
- Secretary of the Security Council
- Permanent Representative of the President and the Cabinet of Ministers to the Jogorku Kenesh
- Permanent Representative of the President and the Cabinet of Ministers to the Constitutional Court

=== Departments ===
- Deputy Department for Preparing Decisions of the President and the Cabinet of Ministers
- Commission on Citizenship Issues
- Commission on Pardons
- Organizational and Inspection Department
- Department of Industry Policy
- Department of State and Municipal Service
- Department of Legal Support of the President and the Cabinet of Ministers
- Department for Monitoring the Implementation of Decisions of the President and the Cabinet of Ministers
- Control Department
- Director of the Situation Center
- Department of Defense, Law Enforcement and Security
- Special Representative for Special Assignments
- Department of Political and Economic Research
- Department of Strategic Planning and Reform Analysis
- Department of SDGs and External Aid Coordination
- Information Policy Service of the Administration
- Protocol Service of the Administration
- Foreign Policy Department of the Administration
- Department for Interaction with Courts and Prosecutor's Office of the Administration
- Special Representative of the Cabinet of Ministers for Border Issues
- Chancellery

=== Presidential Councils ===
- Security Council
- Anti-Corruption Business Council

== See also ==
- Presidential Administration of Russia
- Executive Office of the President of the United States
