= Party of power =

Political party close to state executive

The term "party of power" refers to a political party that has a close relationship with the executive branch of government such that the party appears to function as an extension of the executive rather than as an autonomous political organization. The concept resembles that of a cartel party. In a presidential republic, the party of power typically forms a legislative block that backs the executive. The concept has been commonly applied to post-Soviet political parties. Claims have been made that United Russia, the New Azerbaijan Party, Kazakhstan's Amanat, the People's Democratic Party of Tajikistan, the Democratic Party of Turkmenistan and Georgian Dream (from 2013) are parties of power. Parties that have been considered as parties of power in the past include the Union of Citizens of Georgia (until 2003), the Georgia's United National Movement (until 2013) and the Republican Party of Armenia (until 2018).

Parties of power typically have a hierarchical top-down structure, being centralised, organised in clientelistic networks, lacking a defined or coherent ideology and playing a subordinate role towards the bureaucracy. They have been created by the state as a method to assist in the political interests of the executive branch but while also being reliant on the state to manipulate election outcomes.

The use of the concept and of the term "party of power" has been criticized, including by those who claim that, strictly speaking, United Russia and Amanat do not possess or exercise power themselves. It is not the parties that make decisions and policies in the last resort. The term "parties of power" may therefore be regarded as misleading.

== Russian parties of power ==
=== List of Russian parties of power ===
These parties were specially established for support of the incumbent president or prime minister in the Russian parliament:

- Inter-regional Deputies Group/Democratic Russia (1990–1993, Congress of People's Deputies of the Soviet Union/Congress of People's Deputies of Russia/Supreme Soviet of Russia)
- Democratic Choice of Russia (1993–1994)
- Our Home – Russia (1995–1999, so called "centre-right party of power")
- Unity (1999–2001/2003)
- A Just Russia (the second "party of power", supporting Vladimir Putin and opposing United Russia)
- United Russia (the primary "party of power"; 2001–present)

== Examples in other countries ==
Current parties of power

- Azerbaijan – New Azerbaijan Party
- Belarus – Belaya Rus (Registered as a political party in 2023)
- Cambodia – Cambodian People's Party
- Egypt – Nation's Future Party
- Georgia – Georgian Dream (Since 2013)
- Luxembourg – Christian Social People's Party
- Kazakhstan – Amanat
- Malaysia – United Malays National Organisation
- Singapore – People's Action Party
- Tajikistan – People's Democratic Party of Tajikistan
- Transnistria (Note: States with limited recognition) – Obnovlenie (Since 2016)
- Turkmenistan – Democratic Party of Turkmenistan
- Uzbekistan – Uzbekistan Liberal Democratic Party (Since 2003)

Former parties of power

- Armenia – Republican Party of Armenia (From 1999 to 2018).
- Artsakh – Free Motherland and Democratic Party of Artsakh (From 2005 to 2023)
- Egypt – National Democratic Party (From 1978 to 2011)
- (Georgia (country)) Georgia – Union of Citizens of Georgia (From 1995 to 2003)
- Georgia – United National Movement (From 2003 to 2013)
- Indonesia – Golkar (From 1971 to 1999)
- Kyrgyzstan – Social Democratic Party of Kyrgyzstan (mid-1990s; noted to lack the meaningful organisation)
- Kyrgyzstan – Union of Democratic Forces (From 2000 to 2003; noted to lack the meaningful organisation)
- Kyrgyzstan – Forward Kyrgyzstan Party (From 2003 to 2005; noted to lack the meaningful organisation)
- Kyrgyzstan – Ak Jol (From 2007 to 2010)
- Kyrgyzstan – Social Democratic Party of Kyrgyzstan/Birimdik (From 2010 to 2020)
- Montenegro – Democratic Party of Socialists of Montenegro (From 1990 to 2020)
- Pakistan – Convention Muslim League (From 1962 to 1969)
- Pakistan – Pakistan Muslim League (J) (From 1986 to 1988)
- Pakistan – Pakistan Muslim League (Q) (From 2002 to 2008)
- South Ossetia – Unity Party (2003 to 2011; disputed but modeled after United Russia)
- Ukraine – People's Democratic Party/For United Ukraine! and Social Democratic Party of Ukraine (united) (From 1996 to 2004)
- Ukraine – Party of Regions (From 2010 to 2014)
- Uzbekistan – People's Democratic Party of Uzbekistan (From 1991 to 2003; replaced by a more pluralist party system)

== See also ==
- Bloc party
- Establishment
- For the Freedom of Nations!
- Dominant-party system
- Multi-party system
- Non-partisan democracy

== Literature ==
- Del Sordi, Adele (2011), Parties of power as authoritarian institutions: The cases of Russia and Kazakhstan, Spanish Political Science Association (AECPA)
- Gel′man, Vladimir (2013). "Party Politics in Russia: From Competition to Hierarchy". Power and Politics in Putin's Russia. Routledge. pp. 35–52.
- Herron, Erik S. (2009). Elections and Democracy After Communism?. Palgrave Macmillan.
- Oversloot, Hans; Verheul, Ruben (2013), "Managing Democracy: Political Parties and the State in Russia", Political Parties and the State in Post-Communist Europe, Routledge
- Remington, Thomas (2013). "Patronage and the Party of Power: President-Parliament Relations under Vladimir Putin". Power and Politics in Putin's Russia. Routledge. pp. 81–110.
