= 2003 Kyrgyz referendum =

A double referendum was held in Kyrgyzstan on 2 February 2003. Voters were asked whether they approved of amendments to the constitution, and whether President Askar Akayev should be allowed to remain in office until 2005. Both were approved by wide margins.

== Background ==
The proposed amendments to the constitution would increase the powers of the President, decrease the powers of the Supreme Council, and make several other changes to the Council, including making it unicameral and reducing the total number of seats in the two houses from 105 to 75 in a single house. They also reduced the role of the Constitutional Court, although gave it the power to oversee the constitutionality of political parties, social organisations and religious organisations.

== Results ==
=== Constitutional amendments ===
Choice	Votes	%
For	1,889,203	89.25
Against	227,587	10.75
Total	2,116,790	100.00
Valid votes	2,116,790	99.04
Invalid/blank votes	20,532	0.96
Total votes	2,137,322	100.00
Registered voters/turnout	2,465,684	86.68
Source: Direct Democracy

=== President Akayev to remain in office until 2005 ===
Choice	Votes	%
For	1,941,558	91.75
Against	174,467	8.25
Total	2,116,025	100.00
Valid votes	2,116,025	99.01
Invalid/blank votes	21,195	0.99
Total votes	2,137,220	100.00
Registered voters/turnout	2,465,684	86.68
Source: Direct Democracy
