= Inauguration of Sooronbay Jeenbekov =

2017 Presidential Inauguration of Sooronbay Jeenbekov
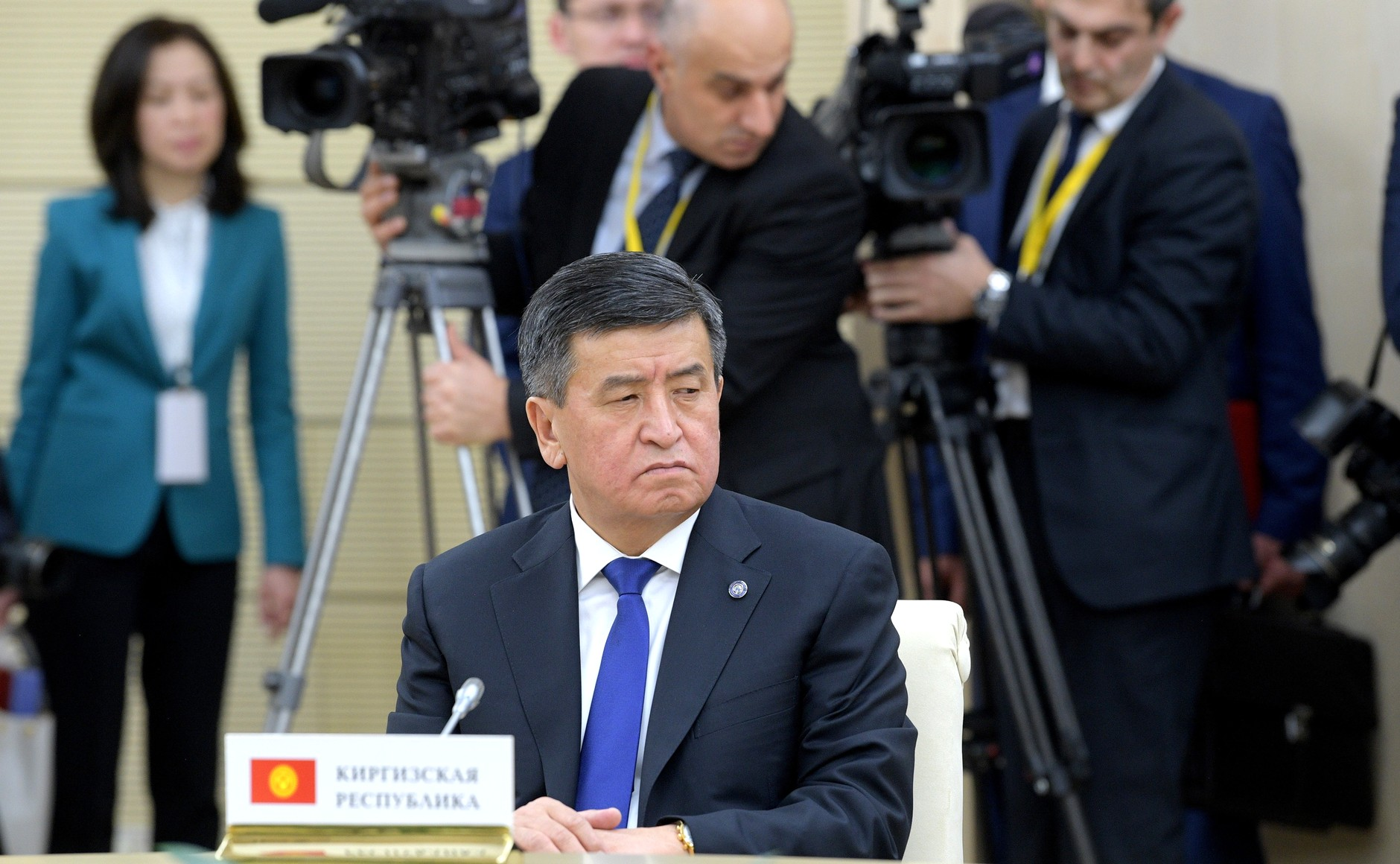
- Date: November 24, 2017; 8 years ago
- Duration: 1 hour and 18 minutes
- Location: Ala Archa State Residence, Bishkek, Kyrgyzstan
- Participants: President of Kyrgyzstan Sooronbay Jeenbekov; outgoing president Almazbek Atambayev

The Inauguration of Sooronbay Jeenbekov as the president of Kyrgyzstan took place on November 24, 2017, in the Enesay reception house of the Ala Archa State Residence in Bishkek. The inauguration was declared the first peaceful transition of power in Kyrgyzstan in its 26-year history by foreign analyst.

== Background ==
Sooronbai Jeenbekov won the presidential elections in Kyrgyzstan that were held on October 15, 2017, beating his opponent Ömürbek Babanov with at least 54.67% of the national vote. His predecessor Almazbek Atambayev, who was limited by one six-year term as president, backed Jeenbekov very strongly for president.

== Ceremony ==
The ceremony took place on November 24, 2017, being the first inauguration ceremony to take place at a state residence of the president of Kyrgyzstan since 2009. 450 people were invited to the inauguration ceremony, including Heroes of the Kyrgyz Republic, members of the Supreme Council, ambassadors to Kyrgyzstan, families of victims and participants of the Kyrgyz Revolution of 2010, as well as representatives of international organizations. The ceremony began at 10:00AM in the Enesai Reception House. It began with Jeenbekov delivering an oath of office before the National Anthem of Kyrgyzstan was played Band of the General Staff of the Armed Forces of Kyrgyzstan. Jeenbekov and outgoing president Almazbek Atambayev then gave remarks at the ceremony. After the ceremony at the state residence concluded, the now president Jeenbekov and former president Atambayev went to the White House where they were met by the Honour Guard Company of the National Guard of Kyrgyzstan, which awaited the two in order to begin the ceremony of Jeenbekov's assumption of the post of commander in chief of the Armed Forces of Kyrgyzstan After Jeenbekov and Atambayev inspected the guard of honor, a parade was held in honor of Jeenbekov.
