= Mayram Akayeva =

Kyrgyz politician

- Майрам Акаева
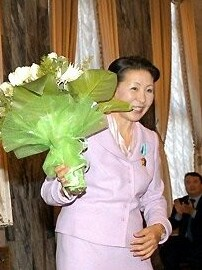
- Akayeva in 2003

First Lady of Kyrgyzstan
- In role 27 October 1990 – 24 March 2005
- President: Askar Akayev
- Preceded by: Office Established
- Succeeded by: Tatyana Bakiyeva

Personal details
- Born: Mayram Duishenovna Akaeva; 7 November 1947 (age 78) Shumkar, Talas District, Kyrgyz SSR, Soviet Union
- Spouse: Askar Akayev (m. 1970)
- Children: 4, Bermet and Aidar
- Occupation: Professor

Mayram Duishenovna Akaeva (Russian: Майрам Дуйшеновна Акаева) is the wife of the ousted President of Kyrgyzstan Askar Akayev and First Lady of Kyrgyzstan from 1990 to 2005.

== Early life and career ==
Akayeva was born in the village of Shumkar in the Talas District of Kyrgyzstan on November 7, 1947. She first met her future husband in 1969 at a house party for fellow college students. At the time, he was a professor at the Leningrad Institute of Precision Mechanics and Optics (ITMO), whence he had graduated two years earlier with an honors degree in mathematics, engineering and computer science. One year later they married and had their first two children in Leningrad. From 1974-1977, she was a lecturer at ITMO, before returning to the Kyrgyz SSR where her kids would spend the rest of their childhood, and where Akayeva continued her career as an associate professor at the Frunze Polytechnic Institute. Following the fall of the Soviet Union, she taught at the Kyrgyz National University in the capital. At around this time, her husband, who was the leader of the Kyrgyz SSR at the time, was elected to the newly formed post of President of the Kyrgyz Republic. As a result, Akayeva automatically became the original First Lady of Kyrgyzstan. She became the first spouse of a leader of a post-Soviet states to publish her memoirs, publishing the book "Hope Has No Night". During her tenure as first lady, she held the post of President of the Meerim International Charitable Foundation for the Support of Motherhood and Childhood, a position she held until 2005. That year, as the events of the Tulip Revolution were unfolding in Kyrgyzstan, Akayeva and her entire family, including President Akayev, were exiled to Kazakhstan, and then more permanently to Moscow, Russia, where they reside today.

== Personal life ==
Akayeva and her husband have four children together: Bermet, Aidar, Saadat, and Ilym. Akayeva herself has two sisters, both of whom worked in government. Besides Kyrgyz, she is also fluent in Russian. In October 2003, she was awarded the Order of Friendship by Russian president Vladimir Putin for her work in supporting mothers of children. Five years later, she was elected in Moscow as a member of the Academy of Noble Affairs in Honor of the Fatherland and the Academy of Security, Defense and Law and Order Issues of the Russian Federation.
