= Ala Archa State Residence =

- "Ала-Арча" мамлекеттик резиденциясы государственная резиденция «Ала-Арча»
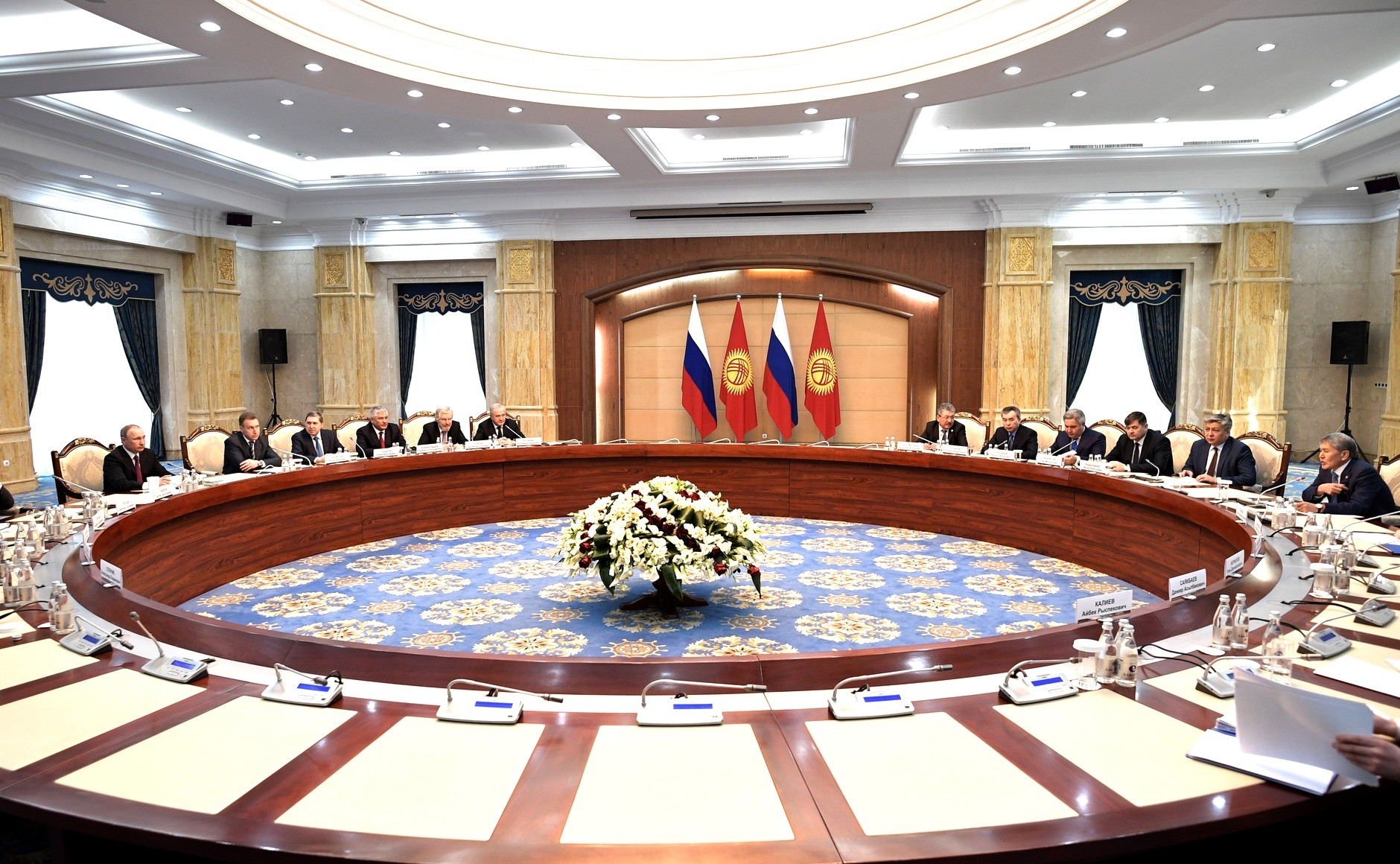
- The Grand Conference hall
- Interactive map of the Ala Archa State Residence area

General information
- Architectural style: Neoclassical
- Location: Chui Avenue, Chong-Aryk, Bishkek, Kyrgyzstan
- Coordinates: 42°47′31″N 74°34′52″E
- Current tenants: President of Kyrgyzstan
- Construction started: 1974
- Completed: 1987

The Ala Archa State Residence (Kyrgyz: "Ала-Арча" мамлекеттик резиденциясы; Russian: государственная резиденция «Ала-Арча») is an official presidential residence in Bishkek, Kyrgyzstan. It is the current official home of President of Kyrgyzstan Sadyr Japarov.

== Purpose ==
The main tasks of the state residence are to provide material, technical, social and residential services for the president of the Kyrgyz Republic and members of his or her family as well as serve as the main venue for state protocol events of the president, the prime minister, and the chairman of the Supreme Council. Many summits that take place in Bishkek have taken place in the residence, such as the CIS summit of 2008. Acting presidents have the right to live in the residence on a temporary basis. It also helps carry out cultural events and provides hotel services for distinguished individuals. The hotels include traditional yurts, a billiard room and a business center.

== Areas ==
In fall 2018, large-scale renovations were done throughout the State Residence, the first in 10 years. It was finished by the time of the SCO summit in Bishkek the following June.

=== Outside pavilion ===
When Sooronbay Jeenbekov welcomed Vladimir Putin to Bishkek in March 2019, a new marble pavilion was created as part of the renovations outside the residence to provide a sound place for the National Guard to render honors. Nicknamed "the pride of Kyrgyzstan", it is made of Issyk-Kul marble and has a height of seven meters 20 centimeters, as well as 43 meters in length and 22 meters in width.

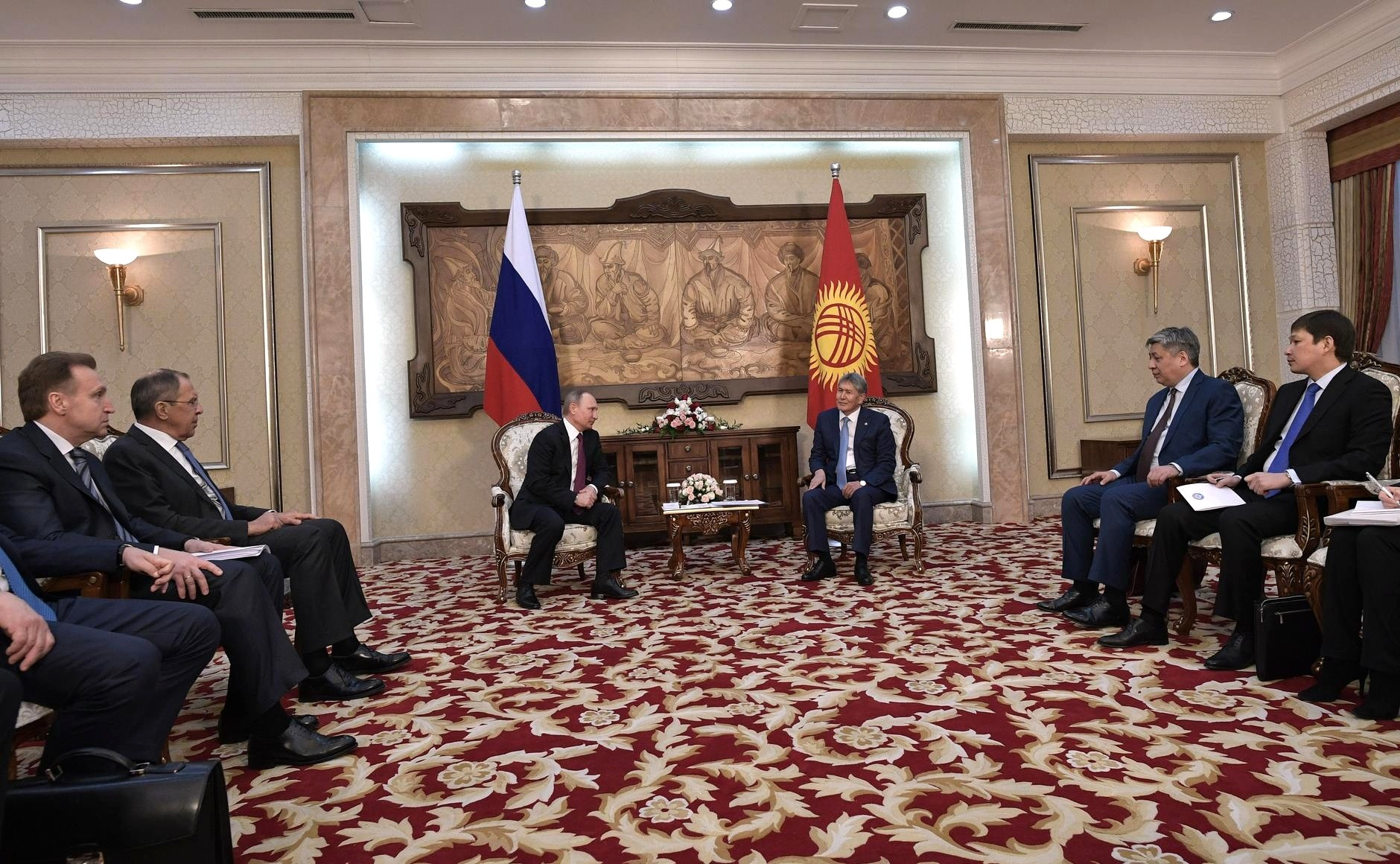
The Aksakal Meeting-Room

=== Enesay Reception House ===
The Enesay Reception House is built in the form of an ethnic Kyrgyz yurt. It hosts many events such as the Inauguration of Sooronbay Jeenbekov in 2017.

=== Residential Area ===
Surrounding the main building also are close to 20 other yurts and residential buildings that were built in 1974 which includes the Ordo House (residence of Sooronbay Jeenbekov) and State Dacha No. 17 (residence of Almazbek Atambayev).

=== Congress Halls ===
- Grand Conference hall
- Small Conference hall
- Press Center
- Banquet hall
- Aksakal Meeting-Room

=== Restaurant ===
The Ala-Archa-4, also known commonly as the Golden Hall restaurant is the oldest building on the territory of the residence, having been built in the 1950s. It is used during state dinners with foreign delegations and foreign guests. It was renovated in 2018 as it had not been renovated since 1998.
