= Valerie Jane Bunce =

American political scientist

- Education: University of Michigan
- Awards: Member, AAAS
- Scientific career
- Fields: Political science; Soviet and Communist studies
- Workplaces: Cornell University; Lake Forest College; Northwestern University; University of Chicago; University of Zagreb; University of Washington; Central European University; Institute for European Studies

Valerie Jane Bunce is an American political scientist, currently the Aaron Binenkorb Professor of International Studies and a Professor of Government at Cornell University. She studies democratization, international democratic movements, ethnic politics, and governance in communist and post-communist states.

== Education and early career ==
Bunce obtained her BA, MA, and PhD from the University of Michigan. She earned her BA in political science and psychology in 1970, and her MA and PhD in 1973 and 1976, respectively, both in political science.

After completing her PhD, Bunce became a professor at Lake Forest College, and then from 1977 until 1991 was a professor at Northwestern University, before joining Cornell University in 1991. She has also been a visiting professor at the University of Chicago, The University of Zagreb, The University of Washington, and the Central European University, and was the director of the Institute for European Studies.

== Career ==
Bunce has been the solo author of two books. Her first book, Do New Leaders Make a Difference? Executive Succession and Public Policy Under Capitalism and Socialism, was released in 1981. Bunce argued that both communist and democratic countries exhibited a similar cycle of policy innovation, in which rapid policy innovations occur whenever a new leader assumes power, followed by a period of incremental or no change until the next leadership transition. Thomas Baylis noted that an important corollary of this theory is that secession crises in Communist regimes therefore must serve a functionalist purpose, which he viewed as a counterintuitive but fundamental claim.

Bunce's second book, Subversive Institutions: The Design and the Collapse of Socialism and the State, was published in 1999. Bunce explains the near-simultaneous collapse of Europe's major communist regimes in terms of their fundamental designs: that they necessarily divided the powerful and strengthened those without power, while also hampering economic performance, a design which was exacerbated by the particular context of the 1980s. In a review written in 2000, Michael Bernhard called Subversive Institutions one of the two "most important books on developments in Europe east of the Elbe since 1989", while Robert Legvold wrote that it "tackles the transcendent questions of an age" with impressive brevity.

In addition to highly cited journal articles in venues like Comparative Political Studies and World Politics, Bunce was also a coauthor of the book Defeating Authoritarian Leaders in Postcommunist Countries (2011) and a co-editor of Democracy and Authoritarianism in the Postcommunist World (2009).

In 2019, a citation analysis by the political scientists Hannah June Kim and Bernard Grofman listed Bunce as the 37th most cited woman who is currently an active political science faculty member at an American university. Bunce's work has also been referenced in major media outlets like The New York Times, The Washington Post, Foreign Affairs, and The New Republic. In 2010, she was inducted in the American Academy of Arts and Sciences.

== Selected works ==
- Do New Leaders Make a Difference? Executive Succession and Public Policy Under Capitalism and Socialism (1981)
- Subversive Institutions: The Design and the Collapse of Socialism and the State (1999)

== Selected awards ==
- Member, American Academy of Arts and Sciences
