= 2005 Kyrgyz parliamentary election =

- 27 February 2005 (first round); 13 March 2005 (second round)
- All 75 seats in the Supreme Council; 38 seats needed for a majority
- Turnout: 57% (first round); 59% (second round)
| Party | Leader | Seats | +/– |
|---|---|---|---|
| Alga, Kyrgyzstan! | Bermet Akayeva | 17 | New |
| Atajurt | Roza Otunbayeva | 6 | New |
| KKP | Nikolay Baylo | 3 | −3 |
| SDPK | Abdygani Erkebaev | 1 | New |
| Independents | — | 47 | −26 |
This lists parties that won seats. See the complete results below.
| Prime Minister before | Prime Minister after |
|---|---|
| Nikolai Tanayev; Independent | Kurmanbek Bakiyev; People's Movement |

Parliamentary elections were held in Kyrgyzstan on 27 February and 13 March 2005. The belief that the elections had been rigged by the government led to widespread protests, culminating in the Tulip Revolution on 24 March in which President Askar Akayev was overthrown.

== Background ==
A new constitution was introduced following a 2003 referendum, and provided for a unicameral 75-seat Supreme Council, replacing the bicameral Supreme Council which had consisted of the Assembly of People's Representatives and Legislative Assembly. MPs were elected from single-member constituencies using the two-round system, in which a candidate had to receive a majority of the vote in the first round to be elected, with a second round held if no candidate achieved a majority.

== Campaign ==
A total of 425 candidates were registered to contest the elections, although this was reduced to 389 by election day as 23 withdrew and 12 were disqualified by the electoral commission. Around 65% of candidates were nominated by either the Forward Kyrgyzstan Party of President Akayev, or the pro-government Democratic Party Adilet. Akayev's children Aidar and Bermet were amongst those nominated.

The 44 opposition parties formed coalitions in an attempt to unite against the ruling coalition, coalescing into four to five blocs. However, several members of the opposition were prevented from running by a new electoral law that required candidates to have lived in the country for at least five years before an election. Among the alliances was the Civic Union "For Fair Elections", formed on 20 May 2004 by several groups, notably the main opposition party Ar-Namys and the Social Democratic Party.

== Conduct ==
Over 550 observers attended the elections. The Commonwealth of Independent States observers reported that the elections had been "fair and transparent", whilst the Organization for Security and Cooperation in Europe (OSCE) stated that the vote had failed to meet international standards. The OSCE highlighted unsealed ballot boxes and inaccuracies in voter rolls as some of the issues.

During the election campaign, most of the Kyrgyz media was heavily focussed on Akayev. The electricity supply to the country's only independent printing house was cut off on 22 February, whilst Azattyk Radio, which had been one of the few media outlets to provide balanced coverage of the elections, was taken off air on 24 February.

== Results ==
In the first round of voting, 32 candidates were elected, of which ten were reported to be from the pro-government Forward Kyrgyzstan and two from the opposition parties Ata-Zhurt and Asaba; the other twenty were pro-government. Voter turnout was reported to be 57%.

In the second round voter turnout was 59%; 35 seats were won by Akayev supporters and four by the opposition, giving Akayev the backing of 65 of the 75 MPs, whilst the opposition held just six seats; a further four seats were left vacant. In two constituencies voting was postponed until 20 March after second round candidates were disqualified.

| Party | Seats |
|---|---|
| Forward Kyrgyzstan Party | 17 |
| Council for the Unity of the People | 6 |
| Party of Communists of Kyrgyzstan | 3 |
| Social Democratic Party of Kyrgyzstan | 1 |
| Independents | 47 |
| Vacant | 1 |
| Total | 75 |
Source: University of Kassel

== Aftermath ==
Following the both rounds of voting, opposition parties held protests. These spread across the country, and on 24 March Akayev fled to Russia, whilst Prime Minister Nikolai Tanayev resigned. An emergency session of parliament on the same day saw Kurmanbek Bakiyev appointed as Acting Prime Minister. The newly elected Supreme Council formally opened on 27 March, with Omurbek Tekebayev elected as Speaker.

Bakiev announced that new presidential and legislative elections would be held on 26 June. However, the presidential elections were delayed until 10 June and parliamentary elections were not held until December 2007.
