= Forward Kyrgyzstan Party =

Forward, Kyrgyzstan! Алга, Кыргызстан!
- Leader: Bermet Akayeva
- Chairman: Bolot Begaliev
- Founded: 7 September 2003
- Registered: 6 November 2003
- Dissolved: 11 April 2005
- Merger of: Jany Zaman; Manas El; Jany Kyymyl; Party of Cooperators; Birimdik Party
- Headquarters: Bishkek
- Newspaper: Alga, Kyrgyzstan!
- Colours: Blue; White
- Slogan: For a strong Kyrgyzstan!
- 3rd Jogorku Kenesh: 17 / 75

Party flag

Forward, Kyrgyzstan! (Kyrgyz: Алга, Кыргызстан!, romanized: Alga, Kyrgyzstan!) was a political party in Kyrgyzstan. The party was founded in September 2003 as a merger of four parties. According to Azattyk Ünalgysy (Radio Liberty), the Forward Kyrgyzstan Party is considered a party of power. The chairman of the party was Bolot Begaliev but one of its notable founders was Bermet Akayeva, eldest daughter of then-President Askar Akayev; per OSCE, Akayeva was deemed the informal leader of the party. In the 2005 Kyrgyz parliamentary election, the party won 17 seats. While Akayeva did not run as a candidate of the party, she did get elected to parliament.

The party was formed from the merger of four separate parties: Manas El, Jany Kyymyl (New Movement), Jany Zaman (New Time), and the Party of Cooperators. On 8 December 2003, the Birimdik Party (led by former prime minister Amangeldy Muraliyev) decided to merge with the party.

Following the 2005 Tulip Revolution that overthrew Askar Akayev, the future of the party was unclear.

== Election results ==
=== Jogorku Kenesh ===
Election	Leader	Seats	+/–	Government
2005	Bermet Akayeva	17 / 75		Snap election

== See also ==
- List of political parties in Kyrgyzstan
- Politics of Kyrgyzstan
