= Yntymak Ordo =

- Ынтымак Ордо
- Sadyr Japarov and Vladimir Putin in front of Yntymak Ordo, November 2025
- Interactive map of the Yntymak Ordo area

General information
- Architectural style: Neoclassical
- Location: Bishkek, Kyrgyzstan
- Coordinates: 42.8079°N 74.5820°E
- Current tenants: President of Kyrgyzstan
- Construction started: 2022
- Completed: 2024
- Opened: 31 August 2024

The Yntymak Ordo (Kyrgyz: Ынтымак Ордо, lit. 'Palace of Unity') is an official presidential residence in Bishkek, Kyrgyzstan. It is the current official home of President of Kyrgyzstan Sadyr Japarov. Opened in 2024, it serves as the seat of the President of Kyrgyzstan and the Cabinet of Ministers. The building stands on the former site of the Issyk-Kul Hotel.

== History ==
The construction began in the spring of 2022, following the demolition of the Soviet-era Issyk-Kul Hotel. The project was initiated by President Sadyr Japarov as part of a broader effort to rebrand Kyrgyzstan's national image. Although initially intended to be completed by 31 August 2023, construction faced delays due to labor shortages. The building was officially inaugurated on Independence Day in 2024. The complex was initially referred to as Yntymak-Manas Ordo, referencing both national unity and the Epic of Manas, a foundational figure in Kyrgyz identity. However, the official presentation dropped the "Manas" component, and the structure was formally unveiled as Yntymak Ordo. The event was attended by numerous dignitaries, including members of parliament, foreign diplomats, and former president Sooronbay Jeenbekov. A performance by Swedish-Kyrgyz violinist Daniel Lozakovich highlighted the cultural significance of the occasion.

In 2024, President Japarov ordered the creation of a portrait of Apas Jumagulov, who served as the Prime Minister of Kyrgyzstan from 14 December 1993 to 24 March 1998, to be displayed in the corridors of Yntymak Ordo in honor of Jumagulov's 90th birthday.

== Controversy ==
The cost of the building and the identities of its investors and contractors have not been publicly disclosed, raising concerns about transparency. Some critics argue that the project reflects authoritarian tendencies and serves more as a symbol of personal power than national unity.
