= Aigul Jeenbekova =

First Lady of Kyrgyzstan 2017–2020

- Айгүл Жээнбекова
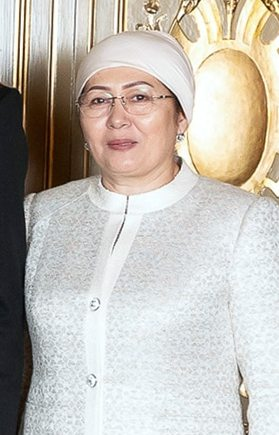

First Lady of Kyrgyzstan
- In role 24 November 2017 – 15 October 2020
- President: Sooronbay Jeenbekov
- Preceded by: Raisa Atambayeva
- Succeeded by: Aigul Japarova (2021)

Personal details
- Born: Aigul Tokoyeva (Айгүл Токоева); 1968 (age 57–58) Kara-Kulja District, Osh Region, Kyrgyz SSR, Soviet Union
- Spouse: Sooronbay Jeenbekov
- Children: 3

Aygül Jeenbekova (Kyrgyz: Айгүл Жээнбекова; née Tokoeva (Токоева); born 1968) was the first lady of Kyrgyzstan from 2017 to 2020 as the wife of President Sooronbay Jeenbekov.

== Biography ==
Jeenbekova was born and raised in the village of Birinchi Kara-Kulja District of the Soviet Union's Osh Region. She studied at the School named after the 23rd Congress of the Communist Party of the Soviet Union (now the Azybek Yusupov School). Her father Toko Kultumushev worked in the district consumer society. Although her family lived in prosperity and well-being, her father died when she was still in her youth, leaving her mother Sylan, raise her through her childhood, which in effect, thought Jeenbekova the idea of hard work.

She first became acquainted with Sooronbay Jeenbekov in 1983, when he was at the time, a chief livestock specialist of the Soviet farm in the Osh region. Jeenbekov saw her once when he passed through her village and asked a saleswoman for her address. Not long after they met, Jeenvekov moved into her husband's house and received a blessing from his parents. They moved around 12 years later to the Kyrgyz capital of Bishkek when Jeenbekov Deputy of the Assembly of People's Representatives. She officially became the First Lady of Kyrgyzstan on 24 November 2017, succeeding Almazbek Atambayev's wife Raisa.

== Personal and public life ==
Jeenbekova is eldest in her family, having 5 younger sisters and 3 brothers. She has 3 children with her husband. The eldest daughter Baktygul is married and graduated from the Kyrgyz-Russian Slavic University, while the youngest son Iman is in the 4th grade. Like most Kyrgyzstanis, she is conversant in Russian as well as Kyrgyz. In the year since she became first lady, she has been known only for her rare appearances to the public. Her first public photo with her husband was during the New Years celebrations on 31 December 2017. She was also, according to MP Irina Karamushkina, seen celebrating former first lady Raisa Atambayeva's 60th birthday at Atambayeva's residence in late June of the year. In September 2018, she took part in a number of events, most notably receiving Emine Erdogan, wife of Turkish President Recep Tayyip Erdoğan, at the 2018 World Nomad Games, opening the Chingiz Aitmatov Hall in the Turkish-Kyrgyz Cultural Center with the Turkish first lady.
