= Kyrgyz National Philharmonic =

Concert hall in Bishkek, Kyrgyzstan

Coordinates: 42.8783°N 74.5875°E

- Orchestra
- Native name: Кыргыз Улуттук филармониясы (Kyrgyz); Кыргызская национальная филармония (Russian)
- Founded: 7 October 1936
- Location: Bishkek, Kyrgyzstan
- Concert hall: Kyrgyz National Philharmonic building

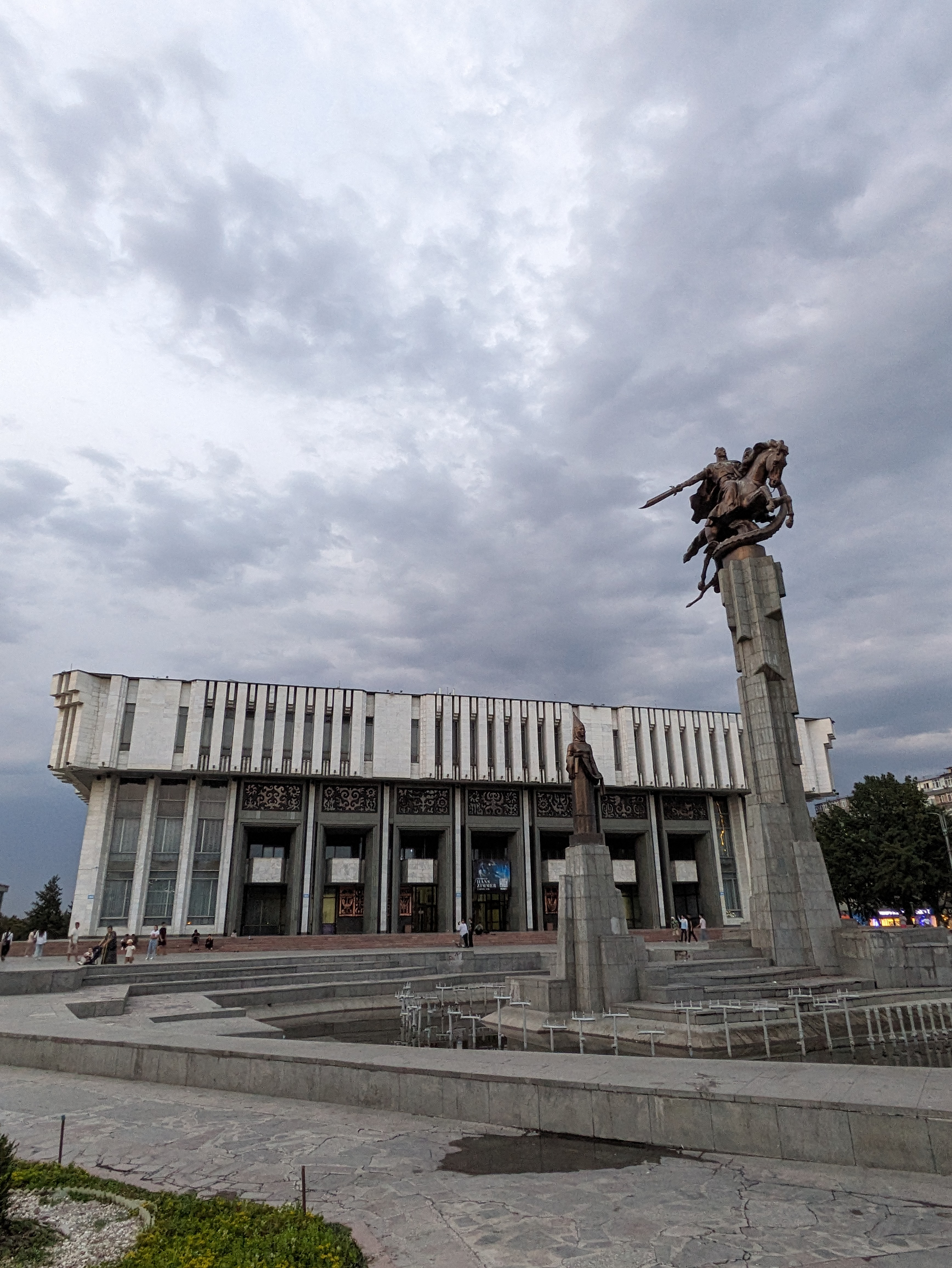
Kyrgyz National Philharmonic

The Toktogul Satylganov Kyrgyz National Philharmonic is a landmark building in Bishkek, Kyrgyzstan and home to musical performances. It is named after Kyrgyz aqyn Toktogul Satylganov.

== Building design ==
The Philharmonic Society, founded on 7 October 1936 on the basis of the orchestra of folk instruments, did not have its own concert hall for many years, with the concerts being staged in the halls of Komvuz as well as the hall of the Ministry of Agriculture. The building has a large hall for 1,108 seats and a small organ hall for 314 seats. The current building was designed by A. Pechenkin and completed in 1980. The building faces city hall. A statue of Manas and fountains are on the grounds. The building's architecture is brutalist from the Soviet era. There was a fire in the building in August 2018.

== Events ==
The Congress of Women of the Kyrgyz Republic hosted 25 U.S. Airmen at the venue in 2010 for International Women's Day. Four presidential inaugurations have taken place at the philharmonic (Askar Akayev in 2000, Roza Otunbayeva in 2010, Almazbek Atambayev in 2011, and Sadyr Japarov in 2021).
