= President of Kyrgyzstan =

Head of state and government

President of the Kyrgyz Republic
- Кыргыз Республикасынын Президенти (Kyrgyz); Президент Кыргызской Республики (Russian)
- Presidential badge

- Presidential standard

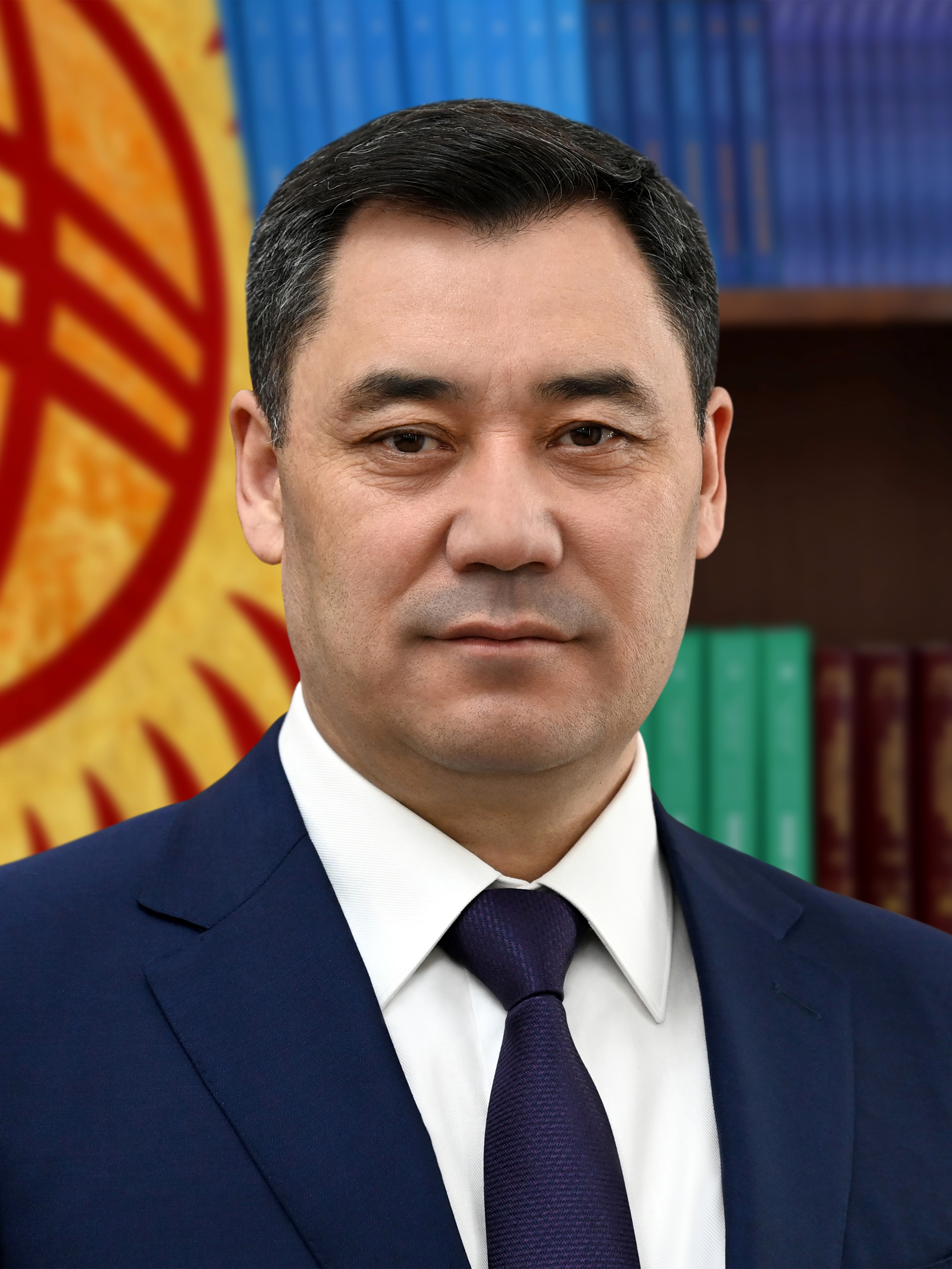
- Incumbent; Sadyr Japarov since 28 January 2021
- Presidential Administration of Kyrgyzstan
- Style: Mr. President (informally); Comrade Commander-in-Chief (military); His Excellency (international correspondence)
- Status: Head of state Head of government
- Member of: Cabinet; Security Council
- Residence: Yntymak Ordo, Bishkek
- Seat: Bishkek, Kyrgyzstan
- Appointer: Direct popular vote
- Term length: Five years, renewable once
- Constituting instrument: Constitution of Kyrgyzstan (2021)
- Precursor: Chairmen of the Supreme Soviet of the Kirghiz SSR
- Inaugural holder: Askar Akayev
- Formation: 27 October 1990; 35 years ago
- Salary: 1 281 609 som/US$ 14,660 annually
- Website: presidentkg.org

The president of Kyrgyzstan, officially the president of the Kyrgyz Republic, (Note: Kyrgyz: Кыргыз Республикасынын Президенти, romanized: Kyrgyz Respublikasynyn Prezidenti; Russian: Президент Кыргызской Республики, romanized: Prezident Kyrgyzskoj Respubliki) is the head of state and government of the Kyrgyz Republic. The president directs the executive branch of the national government, is the commander-in-chief of the Armed Forces of the Kyrgyz Republic and also heads the Security Council.

The president, according to the constitution, "is the symbol of the unity of people and state power, and is the guarantor of the Constitution of the Kyrgyz Republic, and of an individual and citizen."

== History ==
The office of president was established in 1990 replacing the chairman of the Supreme Soviet that existed, in different forms, from 1936 whilst the country was known as the Kirghiz Soviet Socialist Republic.

The first popularly elected officeholder was Askar Akayev, who served from 27 October 1990 until 24 March 2005. In July 2005 after the Tulip Revolution, Kurmanbek Bakiyev was elected. He was re-elected in 2009, but large riots in April 2010 forced him to resign and flee the country. Roza Otunbayeva was selected in April 2010 to head the interim government. She was officially inaugurated on 3 July 2010, as president for a limited term, until elections could be organised. Her successor, Almazbek Atambayev, was elected in the 2011 Kyrgyzstani presidential election and subsequently succeeded Otunbayeva on 1 December that year.

On 16 October 2017, Sooronbay Jeenbekov, the former prime minister, was elected president of the country. He took office on 24 November 2017. On 15 October 2020, Jeenbekov resigned following unrest over the parliamentary elections on 4 October. Jeenbekov was succeeded by Prime Minister Sadyr Japarov, who became acting president before being confirmed as the 6th and current president on 16 October, and officially held the post on 28 January 2021.

== Oath of office ==
On assuming office, the president raises his/her right arm and puts it on the Kyrgyz Constitution while reciting the following oath:

Мен, (аты-жөнү), Кыргыз Республикасынын Президентинин кызматына киришип жатып, өз элимдин алдында жана Ала-Тоо ыйык Ата, мен ант Кыргыз Республикасынын Башмыйзамынын сыйлоого жана коргоого жана анын мыйзамдарын, Кыргыз Республикасынын мамлекеттик, урмат-сый эгемендигин жана көз карандысыздыгын коргоого жана урмат-сый менен Кыргыз Республикасынын бардык жарандарынын эркиндиги менен укуктарын камсыз кылуу жана талыкпай жогорку милдеттерин жүзөгө ашыруу үчүн Кыргыз Республикасынын президенти, бүткүл эл ишенип мага жүктөгөн! Кудай бизди коргой берсин!

Russian Translation:

Я (полное имя), вступая в должность Президента Кыргызской Республики, перед своим народом и священным отечеством Ала-Тоо, клянусь уважать и защищать Конституцию Кыргызской Республики и ее законы, защищать суверенитет и независимость Кыргызского государства, уважать и обеспечивать права и свободы всех граждан Кыргызской Республики с честью и неустанно выполнять высокие обязанности Президент Кыргызской Республики, доверил мне доверие всего народа! Да защитит нас Бог!

English Translation:

I, (full name), in assuming the office of President of the Kyrgyz Republic, before my people and the sacred fatherland of Ala-Too, I swear to respect and protect the Constitution of the Kyrgyz Republic and its laws, to protect the sovereignty and independence of the Kyrgyz state, respect and ensure the rights and freedoms of all citizens of the Kyrgyz Republic with honor and tirelessly carry out the high duties of the President of the Kyrgyz Republic, entrusted to me by the confidence of the whole people! May God protect us!

== Election ==
=== Qualifications ===
The office of president is open to all citizens of Kyrgyzstan who are no younger than 35 years of age, and no older than 65 years of age. A candidate must have a command of the state language, and have resided in the republic for no less than 15 years before the nomination of his or her candidacy for the position. The president cannot be a deputy of the Jogorku Kenesh (Parliament), occupy other positions, or carry out entrepreneurial activities, and must suspend activity in political parties and organizations for their period in office.

On taking office the president must take the following oath, stipulated by Article 45 of the constitution, within 30 days of election before the assembled members of the legislative chamber:

"I, ..., assuming the office of the President of the Kyrgyz Republic, before my People and the Sacred homeland Ala-Too do swear:

to sacredly observe and defend the Constitution and laws of the Kyrgyz Republic; to defend the sovereignty and independence of the Kyrgyz State;

to respect and guarantee the rights and freedoms of all citizens of the Kyrgyz Republic; with honor and tirelessly to perform the great responsibility of the President of the Kyrgyz Republic entrusted to me by the confidence of all the People!".

=== Electoral law ===
The president is elected by the citizens of Kyrgyzstan by a majority of votes cast. These elections are held on the basis of universal suffrage, and by secret ballot. To become a candidate a person must obtain the signatures of fifty thousand registered voters.

For an election to be considered valid the turnout must not be lower than fifty percent. Similarly, if a candidate wins the backing of more than fifty percent of the voters who participated they are the winner. Should no candidate win an outright majority in the first round, the two candidates with the highest number of votes face each other in a second ballot.

== Inauguration ceremony ==
The Inauguration ceremony of the president of Kyrgyzstan is a ceremony that takes place to mark the start of a new term for the president of Kyrgyzstan.

List of inaugural ceremonies

| Date | President | Location^{Place} | Document Sworn On | Notes |
|---|---|---|---|---|
| 10 December 1991 | Askar Akayev | White House, Bishkek | Constitution of the Kyrgyz SSR | It was the first presidential inauguration in the history of Kyrgyzstan. |
| 30 December 1995 | Askar Akayev | White House, Bishkek | Constitution of Kyrgyzstan | |
| 9 December 2000 | Askar Akayev | Philharmonic Hall named after Toktogul Satylganov | Constitution of Kyrgyzstan | |
| 14 August 2005 | Kurmanbek Bakiyev | Ala-Too Square | Constitution of Kyrgyzstan | It took place on Ala-Too Square for the first time. The President of Kazakhstan Nursultan Nazarbayev, the Prime Minister of Tajikistan Oqil Oqilov, the Chairman of the National Assembly of Belarus Gennady Novitsky, the Minister of Defense of Turkey Vecdi Gönül, and the Minister of Foreign Affairs of Ukraine Borys Tarasyuk attended the inauguration. |
| 2 August 2009 | Kurmanbek Bakiyev | Government House, Bishkek | Constitution of Kyrgyzstan | |
| 3 July 2010 | Roza Otunbayeva | Philharmonic Hall named after Toktogul Satylganov | Constitution of Kyrgyzstan | |
| 1 December 2011 | Almazbek Atambayev | Philharmonic Hall named after Toktogul Satylganov | Constitution of Kyrgyzstan | He was inaugurated on 1 December 2011. The ceremony was attended by the president of Turkey, Abdullah Gul, and president of Georgia, Mikheil Saakashvili. The ceremony budget cost less than half of what was spent for inauguration ceremony of Kurmanbek Bakiev in 2009. |
| 24 November 2017 | Sooronbay Jeenbekov | Ala Archa State Residence | Constitution of Kyrgyzstan | Main article: Inauguration of Sooronbay Jeenbekov It was the first inauguration ceremony to take place at the Ala Archa State Residence. |
| 28 January 2021 | Sadyr Japarov | Philharmonic Hall named after Toktogul Satylganov | Constitution of Kyrgyzstan | The President of Turkey Recep Tayyip Erdogan, the first President of Kazakhstan Nursultan Nazarbayev were invited, but ultimately did not attend the inauguration. However former leaders Sooronbay Jeenbekov and Roza Otunbayeva did attend. |

== Residences ==
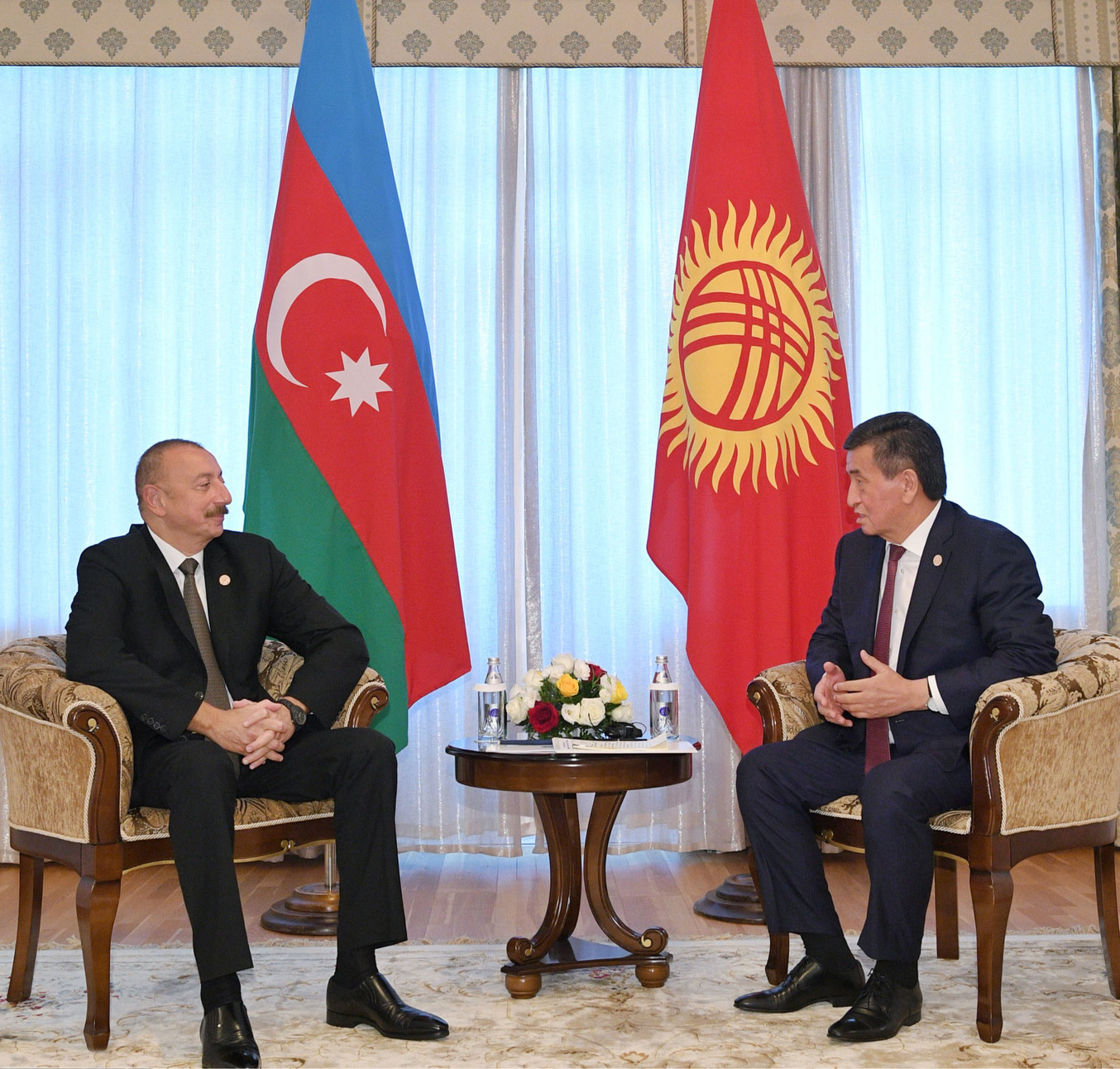
Sooronbay Jeenbekov receiving Ilham Aliyev at the State Residence No.2, or known as the Cholpon-Ata State Residence.

- Yntymak Ordo (Palace of Unity): The new presidential palace of Kyrgyzstan was opened on 30 August 2024. It is located on Mir Avenue in the south of Bishkek.
- White House, Bishkek (after 1985)
- Central Committee Building, Bishkek (before 1985)
- Ala-Archa State Residence
- Cholpon-Ata State Residence
- Jalal-Abad State Residence
- South State Residence

== Duties and functions ==
The head of state holds significant power as provided for in the constitution. This states that they have the authority to:

- Appoint the Prime Minister and other members of government
- Present candidates to Parliament for positions within the Supreme Court
- Direct foreign policy
- Present and sign law
- Announce all elections and enact decrees
- Act as the commander-in-chief of the Armed Forces of Kyrgyzstan

=== Presidential appointments ===
- Prime Minister of Kyrgyzstan
- Cabinet ministers
- Procurator General of Kyrgyzstan
- Chairperson of the State Committee for National Security
- Chairperson of the State Security Service
- Chairperson of the State Border Guard Service
- Chairperson of the State Customs Service
- Chairperson of the State Forensic Experts Service
- Chairperson of the State Penitentiary Service
- Chairperson of the State Service for Combating Economic Crimes
- Chairperson of the National Bank of Kyrgyzstan
- Chief of the General Staff of Armed Forces
- Commanders of the different service branches
- Members of the Supreme Court of Kyrgyzstan
- Head of the Presidential Administration
- Press secretary
- Ambassadors of Kyrgyzstan

== Impeachment ==
The president may be dismissed from office by Parliament only on the basis of a charge made by the Legislative Assembly of state treason or another grievous crime supported by a ruling of the Constitutional Court. Such a decision requires the support of two-thirds of the Jogorku Kenesh who are immediately dismissed should the president be found innocent.

== Succession ==
If the president becomes unable to carry out their duties for reasons such as death, illness or impeachment, the prime minister shall carry out their duties until the election of a new head of state. This must take place within three months of the termination of their Presidency. Kyrgyzstan has only had one peaceful transition of power from president to president (in 2017). Askar Akayev was forced from office by the Tulip Revolution of 2005 and Kurmanbek Bakiyev was forced from office by the Kyrgyz Revolution of 2010. Almazbek Atambayev was peacefully succeeded by Sooronbay Jeenbekov in 2017. However, Jeenbekov resigned from office due to the 2020 Kyrgyzstani protests and was succeeded by Sadyr Japarov.

== List of presidents of Kyrgyzstan ==
indicates an individual serving as an acting or provisional president of Kyrgyzstan

| No. | Portrait | Name (lifespan) | Term of office | | | Political party | Elected |
| No. | Portrait | Name (lifespan) | Took office | Left office | Time in office | Political party | Elected |
|---|---|---|---|---|---|---|---|
| 1 | | Askar Akayev (born 1944) | 27 October 1990 | 24 March 2005 | 14 years, 148 days | Independent (Affiliated with the Forward Kyrgyzstan Party from 2003 until 2005.) | 1990 |
| 1 | | Askar Akayev (born 1944) | 27 October 1990 | 24 March 2005 | 14 years, 148 days | Independent (Affiliated with the Forward Kyrgyzstan Party from 2003 until 2005.) | 1991 |
| 1 | | Askar Akayev (born 1944) | 27 October 1990 | 24 March 2005 | 14 years, 148 days | Independent (Affiliated with the Forward Kyrgyzstan Party from 2003 until 2005.) | 1995 |
| 1 | | Askar Akayev (born 1944) | 27 October 1990 | 24 March 2005 | 14 years, 148 days | Independent (Affiliated with the Forward Kyrgyzstan Party from 2003 until 2005.) | 2000 |
| — | | Ishenbai Kadyrbekov (born 1949) acting | 24 March 2005 | 25 March 2005 | 1 day | Independent | — |
| — | | Kurmanbek Bakiyev (born 1949) | 25 March 2005 | 14 August 2005 | 142 days | Independent (25 March 2005 – 14 August 2005) | — |
| 2 | | Kurmanbek Bakiyev (born 1949) | 14 August 2005 | 2 August 2009 | 4 years, 236 days | People's Movement of Kyrgyzstan (14 August 2005 – 15 October 2007) | 2005 |
| 2 | | Kurmanbek Bakiyev (born 1949) | 2 August 2009 | 7 April 2010 (de facto); 15 April 2010 (de jure) | 4 years, 236 days | Ak Jol (15 October 2007 – 7 April 2010 (de facto)/15 April 2010 (de jure)) | 2009 |
| — | | Roza Otunbayeva (born 1950) | 7 April 2010 | 3 July 2010 | 87 days | Social Democratic Party of Kyrgyzstan | — |
| 3 | | Roza Otunbayeva (born 1950) | 3 July 2010 | 1 December 2011 | 1 year, 151 days | Social Democratic Party of Kyrgyzstan | — (Note: Roza Otunbayeva was proclaimed president of the transitional period on 27 June 2010 after a new constitution had been adopted.) |
| 4 | | Almazbek Atambayev (born 1956) | 1 December 2011 | 24 November 2017 | 5 years, 358 days | Social Democratic Party of Kyrgyzstan | 2011 |
| 5 | | Sooronbay Jeenbekov (born 1958) | 24 November 2017 | 15 October 2020 | 2 years, 326 days | Social Democratic Party of Kyrgyzstan | 2017 |
| — | | Sadyr Japarov (born 1968) acting | 15 October 2020 | 14 November 2020 | 30 days | Mekenchil | — |
| — | | Talant Mamytov (born 1976) acting | 14 November 2020 | 28 January 2021 | 75 days | Kyrgyzstan | — |
| 6 | | Sadyr Japarov (born 1968) | 28 January 2021 | Incumbent | 5 years, 266 days | Mekenchil | 2021 |

== See also ==
- Prime Minister of Kyrgyzstan
- Vice President of Kyrgyzstan
- Leadership of Communist Kyrgyzstan
- Security Council of Kyrgyzstan
