= Honor Guard Battalion (Kyrgyzstan) =

701st Military Unit of the National Guard
- Улуттук гвардиянын 701-аскердик бөлүгү
- Active: July 1992 – present
- Country: Kyrgyzstan
- Branch: National Guard
- Type: Honor Guard
- Role: Ceremonial Guard
- Size: Battalion
- Part of: Bars Separate Commandant's Brigade
- Garrison/HQ: Bishkek
- Nickname: Military Unit 701

Commanders
- Current commander: Captain Maksat Rahimdinov
- Notable commanders: Daniyar Isakov

The Honor Guard Battalion (Kyrgyz: Ардактуу кароол батальону; Russian: Батальон почетного караула), officially known as the 701st Military Unit of the National Guard (Kyrgyz: Улуттук гвардиянын 701-аскердик бөлүгү; Russian: Войсковая часть 701 Национальной гвардии) or simply Military Unit 701. is the ceremonial unit of the National Guard of Kyrgyzstan.

== History ==
The unit has its origins in the Odessa Pilot School, which was evacuated to Frunze (now Bishkek) in 1941 during the Second World War. After independence, the unit territory was transferred to the newly formed National Guard. It assumed its duties in July 1992. In November 2015, the unit received its first unit banner from General Janybek Kaparov. That same year, it was recognized as the best unit and awarded the National Guard's challenge pennant.

== Domestic activities ==
=== State events ===
The unit takes a direct role in the provision of state protocol and ceremonial events, particularly in state visits in Bishkek taking place at Yntymak Ordo (previously at Ala Archa State Residence). It provides ceremonial support for the President of Kyrgyzstan, the Chairman of the Cabinet of Ministers, the Ministry of Defense, and the General Staff of Armed Forces. The unit has been involved in various state events through the years. Activities where they were involved include their attendance in various state funerals and in the Independence Day and Victory Day celebrations in on Ala-Too Square and Victory Square respectively, where they always provide the honor guard unit and color guard detachment for the annual parade among other commemorative activities. It also conducts the presidential inaugural parade of the National Guard during Kyrgyz Presidential Inaugurations.

=== Changing of the Guard ===
The soldiers of the guard of honor of the National Guard stand at attention at the National Flagpole on Ala-Too Square in Bishkek, performing a changing of the guard ceremony every hour since August 16, 1998. The unit was briefly removed in 2009, during work related to replacing the flagpole. It was briefly removed again for similar reasons in 2023.

== Foreign activities ==
It represented the Kyrgyz Republic at foreign military parades:

- 2015 Moscow Victory Day Parade
- 2015 China Victory Day Parade
- 2019 Minsk Independence Day Parade
- 2024 Minsk Independence Day Parade
- 2025 Minsk Victory Day Parade

== See also ==
- 154th Preobrazhensky Independent Commandant's Regiment
- Aibyn Regiment
