= National Guard (Kyrgyzstan) =

Military branch in Kyrgyzstan

- Улуттук гвардия (Kyrgyz)
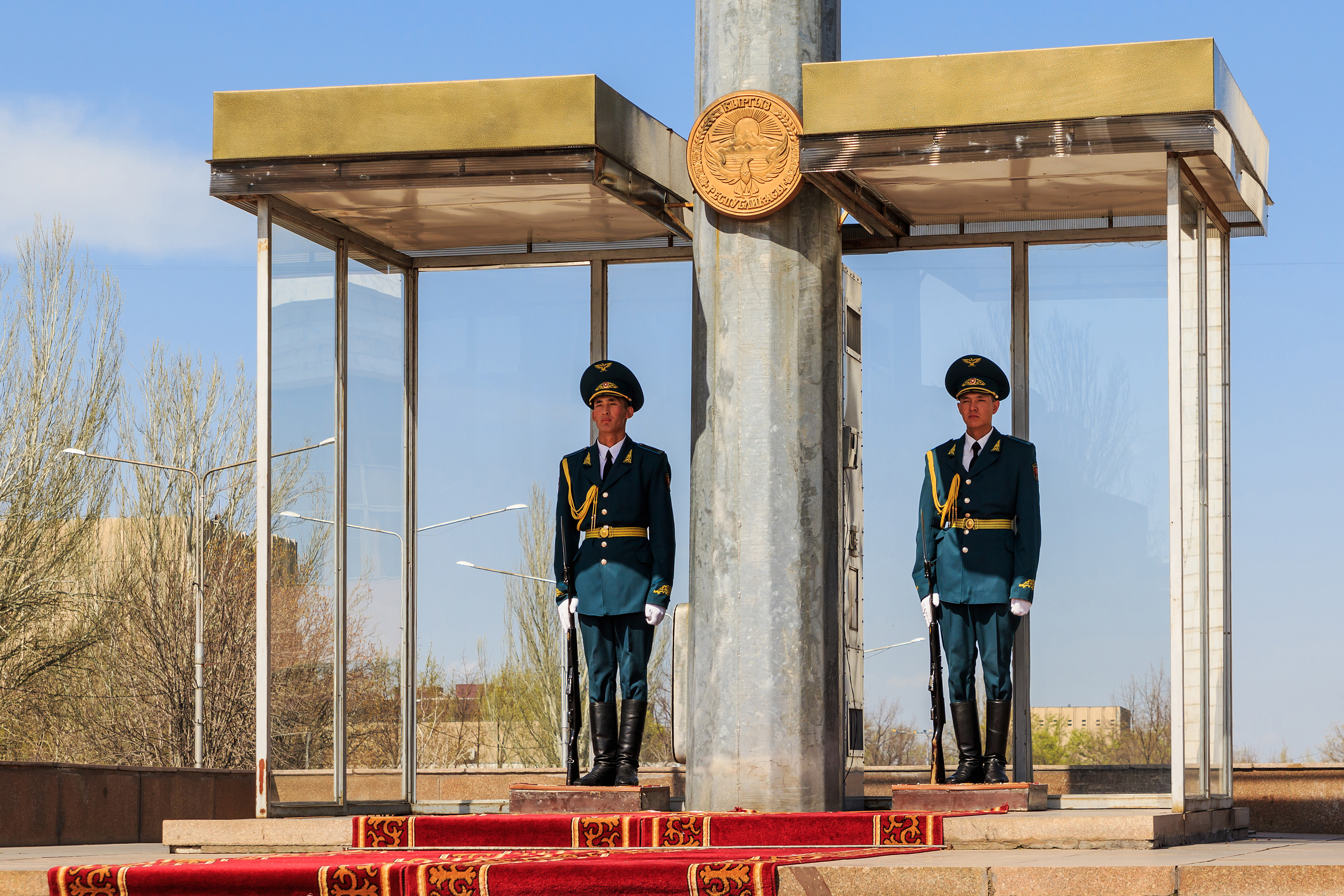
- The honor guard of the National Guard standing at attention on Ala-Too Square
- Active: 6 December 1991; 34 years ago
- Country: Kyrgyzstan
- Role: public duties, physical security
- Size: 3,000
- Part of: Armed Forces of the Kyrgyz Republic
- Headquarters: Bishkek
- March: "Let's Go, Guard!" («Алга, Гвардия!»)
- Anniversaries: July 20 (Day of the National Guard)
- Hymn: Anthem of the National Guard («Улуттук гвардиянын гимни»)

Commanders
- Commander-in-chief: Sadyr Japarov
- Commander of the National Guard: Colonel Daniyar Isakov

Insignia
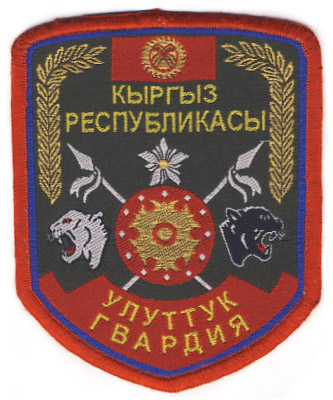
- Shoulder Patch

The National Guard of Kyrgyzstan (Kyrgyz: Кыргыз Республикасынын Улуттук гвардиясы, romanized: Kyrgyz Respublikasynyn Uluttuk gvardia) is the National Guard of the Armed Forces of the Republic of Kyrgyzstan.

== History ==
The national guard was founded on 9 December 1991, by order of President Askar Akayev. The troops took their first oath 20 July 1992. It carries out functions of a representative and protocol nature, protection and protection of strategic facilities of the country, liquidation of the consequences of natural disasters and emergency situations. In 2014, the Internal Troops of the Ministry of the Interior were absorbed into the National Guard as a result of military reforms in the country. This arrangement would stay until September 2018 when the two were separated and the Internal Troops were reformed. In 2016, the Commander of the National Guard was put onto the General Staff of the Armed Forces.

== Functions ==
The following tasks are assigned to the National Guard:

- Protection of the constitutional system and state sovereignty of the country
- Implementation of measures in the conditions of the military and emergency states
- Participation in the territorial defense of the Kyrgyz Republic
- Protection of state and strategic facilities
- Interact with state bodies in charge of national security on issues related to public security
- Implement measures of alertness
- Eliminate of illegal armed groups
- Manage the consequences of natural and man-made emergencies
- Work as an anti-terrorism force
- Perform ceremonial rituals at protocol events
- Ensure the protection of information constituting state secrets

== Composition ==
- Headquarters Command
  - Leadership Staff
    - Commander of the National Guard
    - First Deputy Commander of the National Guard
    - Deputy Commander of the National Guard
    - Deputy Commander of the National Guard
- Bars Separate Commandant's Brigade (Military Unit No. 10126)
  - Honor Guard Battalion (Military Unit No. 701)
    - 1st company (subordinated to the President)
    - 2nd company
    - 3rd company
- Edelweiss Training Center
- Panther Special Forces Brigade
- Rapid Reaction Battalion (at Manas Airbase)
- Band of the National Guard (Улуттук гвардиянын оркестри)
- Medical Division

=== Honor Guard Company ===
The guard of honor is formed from the 701st Military Unit of the National Guard. It take part in state visits and the presidential inaugural parade of the National Guard. The soldiers of the guard of honor of the National Guard stand at attention at the National Flagpole on Ala-Too Square in Bishkek, performing a changing of the guard ceremony every hour since August 16, 1998. It also represented the Kyrgyz Republic at foreign military parades, particularly the 2015 Moscow and Beijing Victory Day Parade. The unit is similar in structure and organization to Russia's 154th Preobrazhensky Independent Commandant's Regiment and Kazakhstan's Aibyn Regiment. In November 2015, the unit received its first unit banner from General Janybek Kaparov. The current commander of the company is the Captain Maksat Rahimdinov.

=== Panther Airborne Brigade ===
The Panther Airborne Brigade (also known as Military Unit 714) was founded in April 1992. It is designed to serve during hostilities. This may include the destruction of gangs, the localization of terrorist groups, and the elimination of natural disasters. It took part in the Batken Conflict of 1999 in southern Kyrgyzstan during which it rebuffed the Islamic Movement of Uzbekistan from the country.

=== Operational Battalion ===
On 20 July 2015, President Almazbek Atambayev presented the battle banner to a separate operational battalion.

== Recruitment and training ==
National Guard personnel are composed of soldiers and civilians alike. The basis for recruitment is laid out under a voluntary contract, as well as conscription of citizens for military service. The selection of servicemen to the National Guard is carried out in coordination with the Ministry of Defence and the Ministry of the Interior. While the National Guard does not provide its own independent educational course, many National Guard personnel are educated in higher military institutions (such as the Armed Forces Military Institute) and foreign institutions (mostly academies in Russia and Kazakhstan). As of recently, new recruits take their oath of allegiance in a ceremony on Victory Square, Bishkek.

== Uniform ==
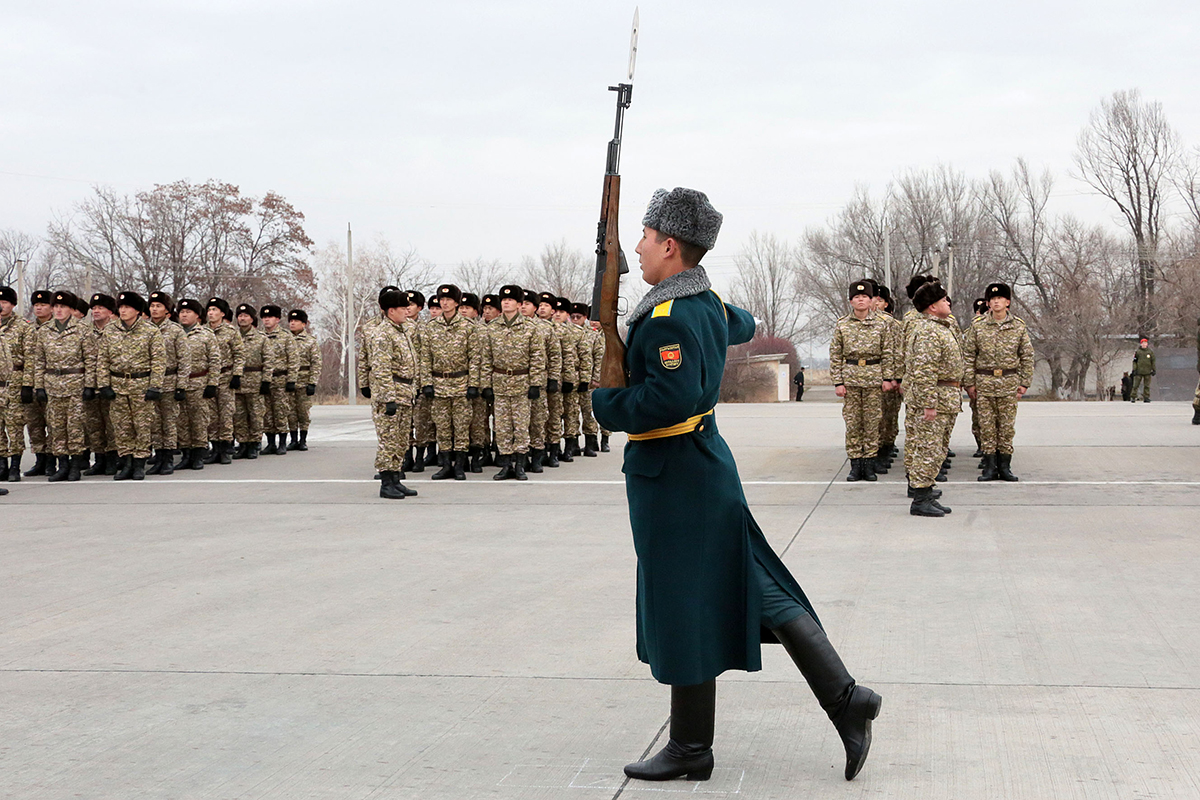
A National Guard member in the winter uniform

In 2015, a new version of the general uniform was presented to the National Guard. The official color of the National Guard is dark turquoise, which is reflected in its uniform. The summer uniform is a dark turquoise tunic worn over a buttoned shirt and tie, which are worn alongside trousers of the same color, as well as boots, white gloves, and a hat. On the other hand, the winter uniform consists of a grey overcoat that is worn over the regular uniform while a traditional Russian Ushanka hat is worn.

== Professional holiday ==
July 20 marks the Day of the National Guard (Kyrgyz: Улуттук гвардия күнү, Russian: День Национальной Гвардии) is the official professional holiday for the National Guard. The holiday coincides with the founding of the National Guard by President Akayev on this date in 1992.

== List of leaders ==
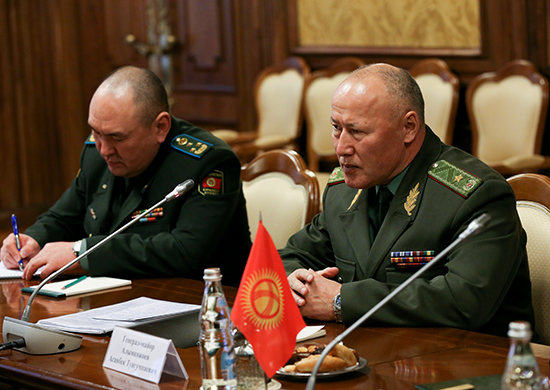
Asanbek Alymkozhoev

- Abdygul Chotbaev (1992 – August 24, 2005)
- Sultan Kurmanov (September 2005 – May 25, 2006)
- Asanbek Alymkozhoev (May 25, 2006 – 2009)
- Asanbek Alymkozhoev (July 24, 2013 – February 6, 2014)
- Melis Satybaldiev (February 22, 2014 – May 12, 2016)
- Melis Satybaldiev (May 12, 2016 - June 16, 2016)
- Mirbek Kasymkulov (June 16, 2016 – February 11, 2017)
- Almazbek Karasartov (February 11, 2017 – January 19, 2019)
- Talantbek Ergeshov (January 19, 2019 – April 29, 2026)
- Daniyar Isakov (April 29, 2026 – Present)

The Commander of the National Guard is the de facto head of the national guard and the highest-ranking officer in the branch. Moreover, he/she is a member of the General Staff and reports directly to its chief.

== Gallery ==
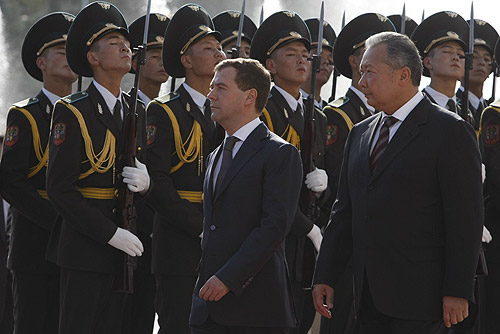
Dmitry Medvedev and Kurmanbek Bakiyev reviewing the National Guard.

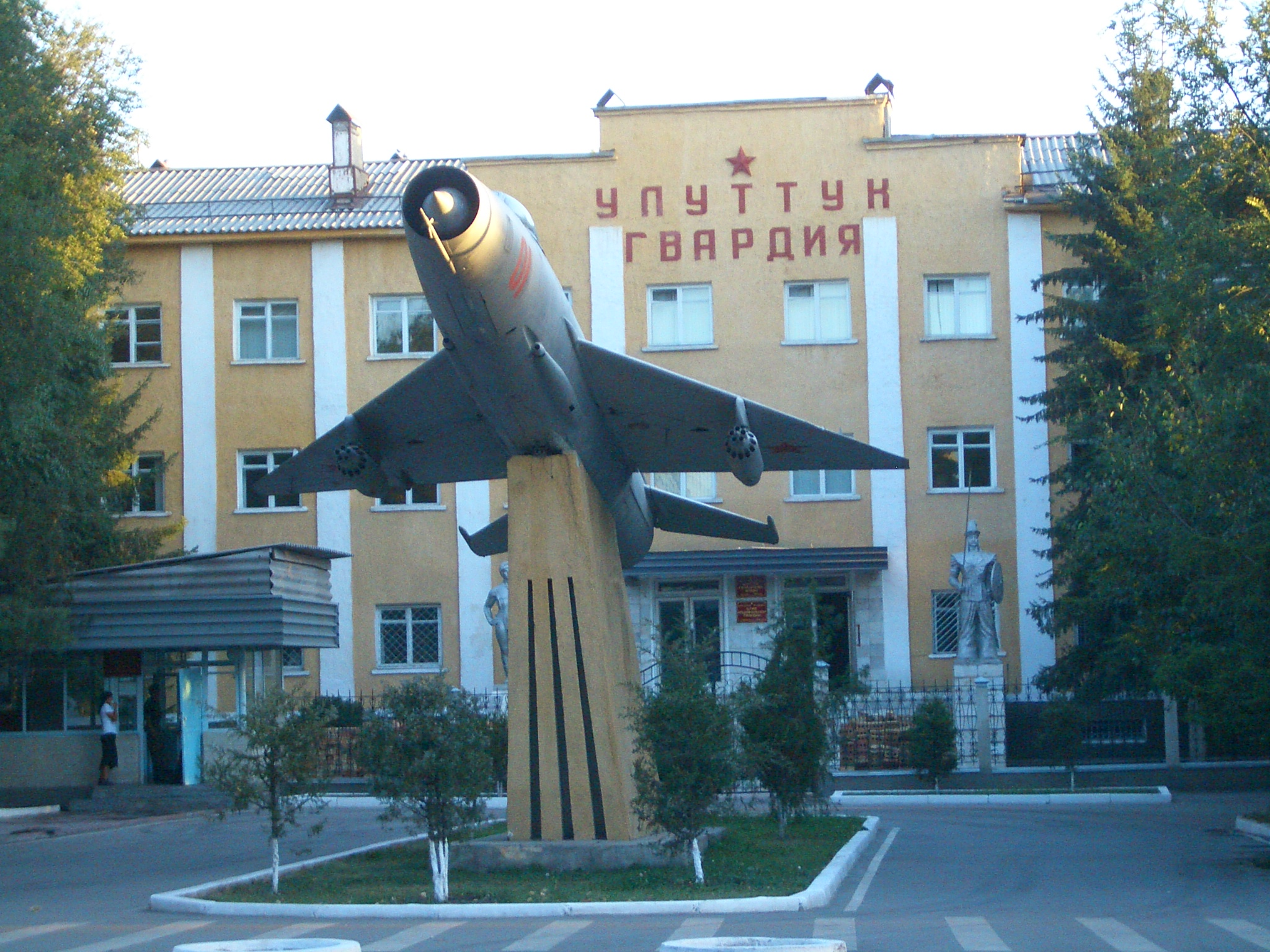
A barracks in downtown Bishkek with a sign saying, "National Guard" in the Kyrgyz language.

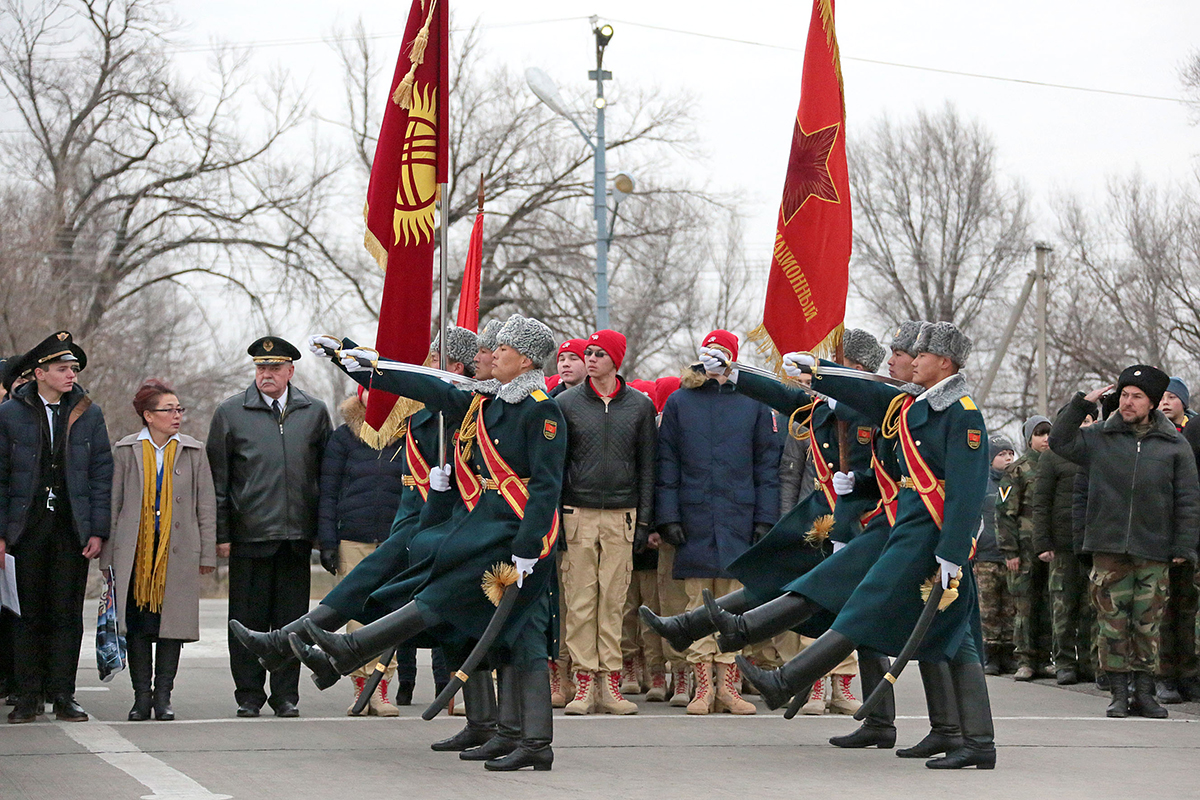
A color guard from the National Guard.

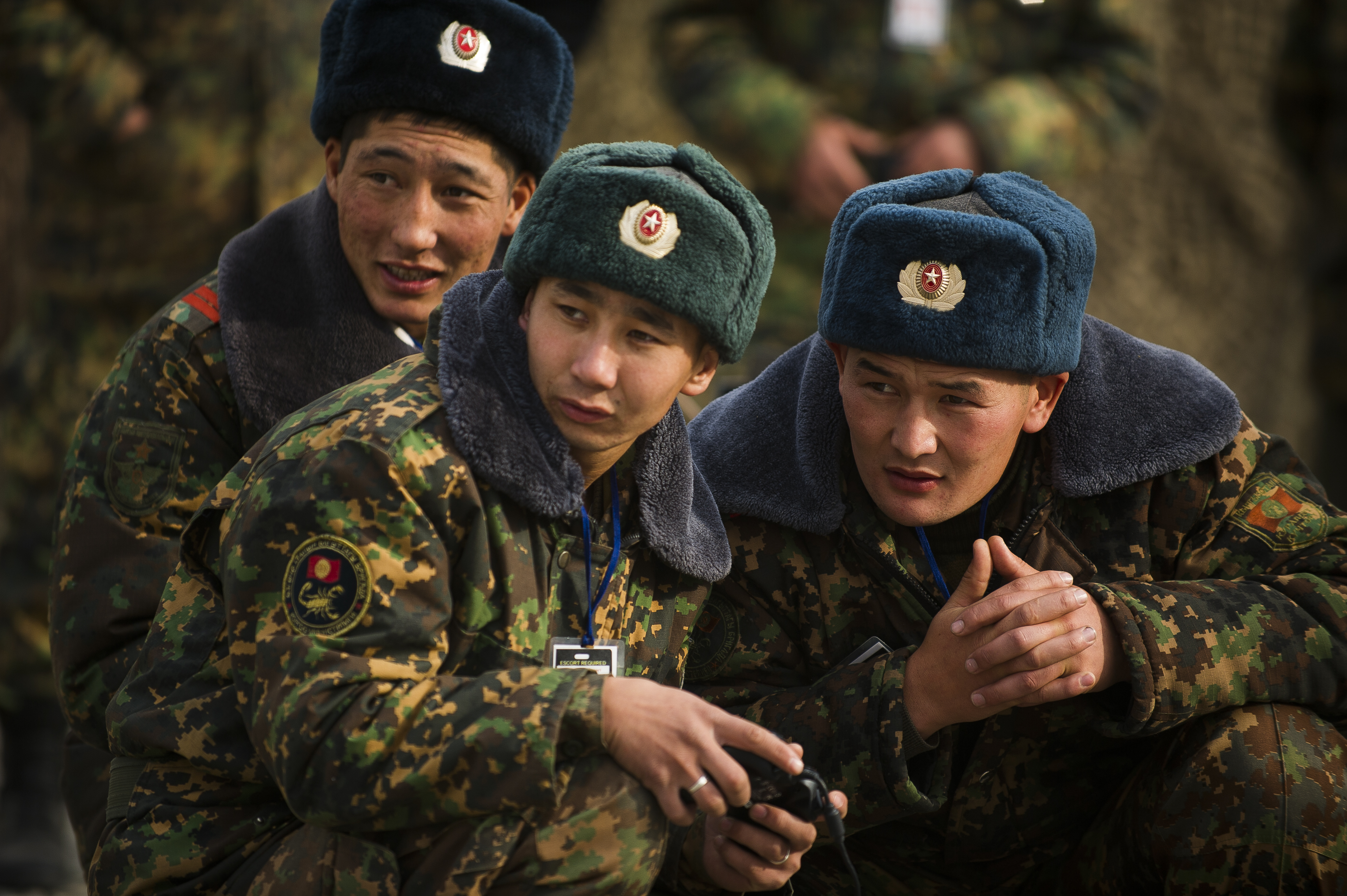
Operational soldiers of the National Guard.

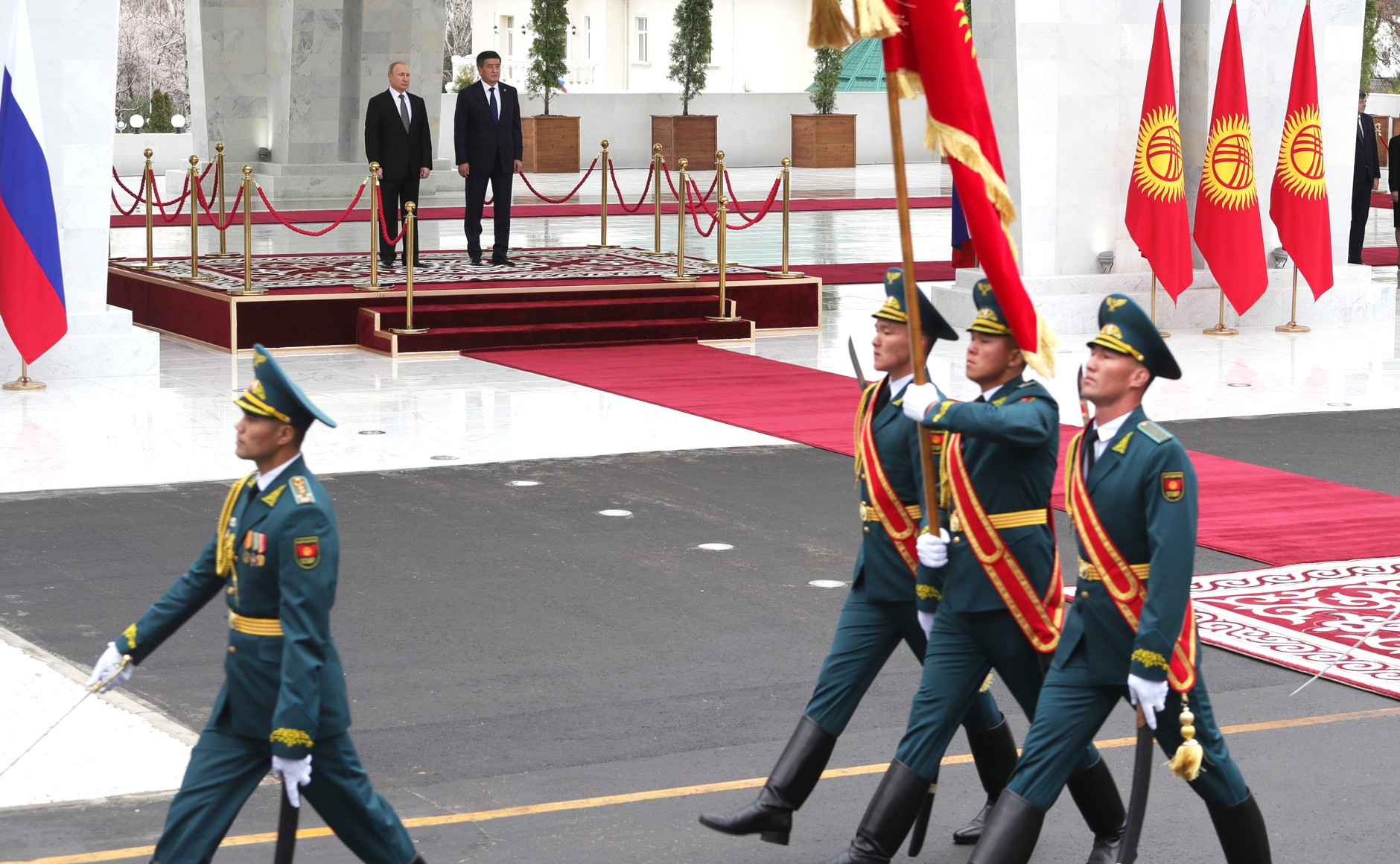
National Guard soldiers marching in front of Presidents Vladimir Putin and Sooronbay Jeenbekov at the Ala Archa State Residence.

== See also ==
- Azerbaijani National Guard
- Republican Guard (Kazakhstan)
- 154th Preobrazhensky Independent Commandant's Regiment
- Independent Honor Guard Battalion of the Ministry of Defence of Turkmenistan
- Presidential National Guard

== Videos ==
- Портретник: Командир военной части №701 Мирлан Темиров
- A member of the National Guard Band
- Показательные выступления Национальной Гвардии 23.07.2012
- Ата Мекен коргоочулар күнүнө арналат
- Улуттук гвардиянын оркестри "Марш Будапешт"/Санат ТВ
- Таңкы беш: Улуттук гвардиянын оркестри
