= Daniyar Isakov =

- Native name: Данияр Исаков
- Born: Daniyar Uchkunbaevich Isakov; 1 May 1974 (age 52); Jangy-Aryk, Kara-Suu, Osh Region, Kyrgyz SSR, Soviet Union
- Allegiance: Kyrgyzstan
- Branch: National Guard
- Service years: 1992-Present
- Rank: Colonel
- Commands: National Guard of Kyrgyzstan

Daniyar Uchkunbaevich Isakov (Kyrgyz: Данияр Учкунбаевич Исаков) is a Kyrgyzstani military officer who served as the Commander of the National Guard of Kyrgyzstan since April 29, 2026.

== Career ==
Isakov was born on May 1, 1974, in the village of Jangy-Aryk of the Kara-Suu District in the Osh Region. He graduated from Kalinin Secondary School No. 70 in 1991 and joined the Armed Forces of the Kyrgyz Republic a year later following its independence from the Soviet Union. He was first assigned to Military Unit 701, the honor guard unit of the National Guard of Kyrgyzstan. He took the oath of allegiance on the same day as Torobay Zulpukarov, who would later become Deputy Speaker of the Supreme Council of Kyrgyzstan. He received a degree from the Ishenally Arabaev Kyrgyz State University in 2000.

He became the commander of the Bars Separate Commandant's Brigade of the National Guard. He also served as Head of the Military Commandant's Office of the Bishkek Garrison of the Ministry of Defense. He commanded an honor guard company contingent from the National Guard on Red Square in Moscow and Tiananmen Square in Beijing during the Moscow Victory Day Parade and the China Victory Day Parade. In 2018, he completed his studies at the Combined Arms Academy of the Armed Forces of the Russian Federation.

On April 29, 2026, he succeeded Talantbek Ergeshov as Commander of the National Guard of Kyrgyzstan. The appointment order was signed by Defense Minister Ruslan Mukambetov.

He is fluent in Kyrgyz and Russian.
