= Military ranks of Kyrgyzstan =

The Military ranks of Kyrgyzstan are the military insignia used by the Armed Forces of the Republic of Kyrgyzstan. Kyrgyzstan is a landlocked country, and does therefore not possess a navy. Being a former Soviet state, Kyrgyzstan shares a rank structure similar to that of Russia.

== Commissioned officer ranks ==
The rank insignia of commissioned officers.

Rank group	General / flag officers	Senior officers			Junior officers
Kyrgyz Army
Kyrgyz Army	Генерал-майор; General-mayor	Полковник; Polkovnik	Подполковник; Podpolkovnik	Майор; Mayor	Капитан; Kapitan	Улук лейтенант Uluk leytenant	Лейтенант; Leytenant	Кенже лейтенант Kenje leytenant
Kyrgyz Air Force
Kyrgyz Air Force	Генерал-майор; General-mayor	Полковник; Polkovnik	Подполковник; Podpolkovnik	Майор; Mayor	Капитан; Kapitan	Улук лейтенант Uluk leytenant	Лейтенант; Leytenant	Кенже лейтенант Kenje leytenant
Rank group	General / flag officers	Senior officers			Junior officers

== Other ranks ==
The rank insignia of non-commissioned officers and enlisted personnel.

Rank group	Senior NCOs						Junior NCOs	Enlisted
Kyrgyz Army
Kyrgyz Army	Улук прапорщик Uluk praporsçik	Прапорщик; Praporsçik	Старшина; Starşina	Улук сержант Uluk serjant	Сержант; Serjant	Кенже сержант Kenje serjant	Ефрейтор; Efreytor	Катардагы жоокер Katardagı jooker
Kyrgyz Air Force
Kyrgyz Air Force	Улук прапорщик Uluk praporsçik	Прапорщик; Praporsçik	Старшина; Starşina	Улук сержант Uluk serjant	Сержант; Serjant	Кенже сержант Kenje serjant	Ефрейтор; Efreytor	Катардагы жоокер Katardagı jooker
Rank group	Senior NCOs						Junior NCOs	Enlisted
