= Victory Square, Bishkek =

Square in Bishkek, Kyrgyzstan

Coordinates: 42.8793°N 74.6162°E

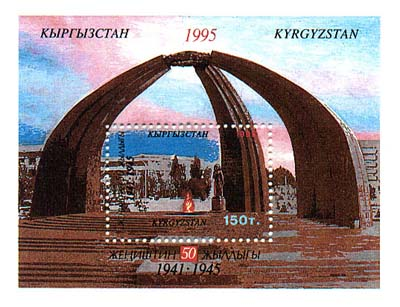
A 1995 stamp of the square.

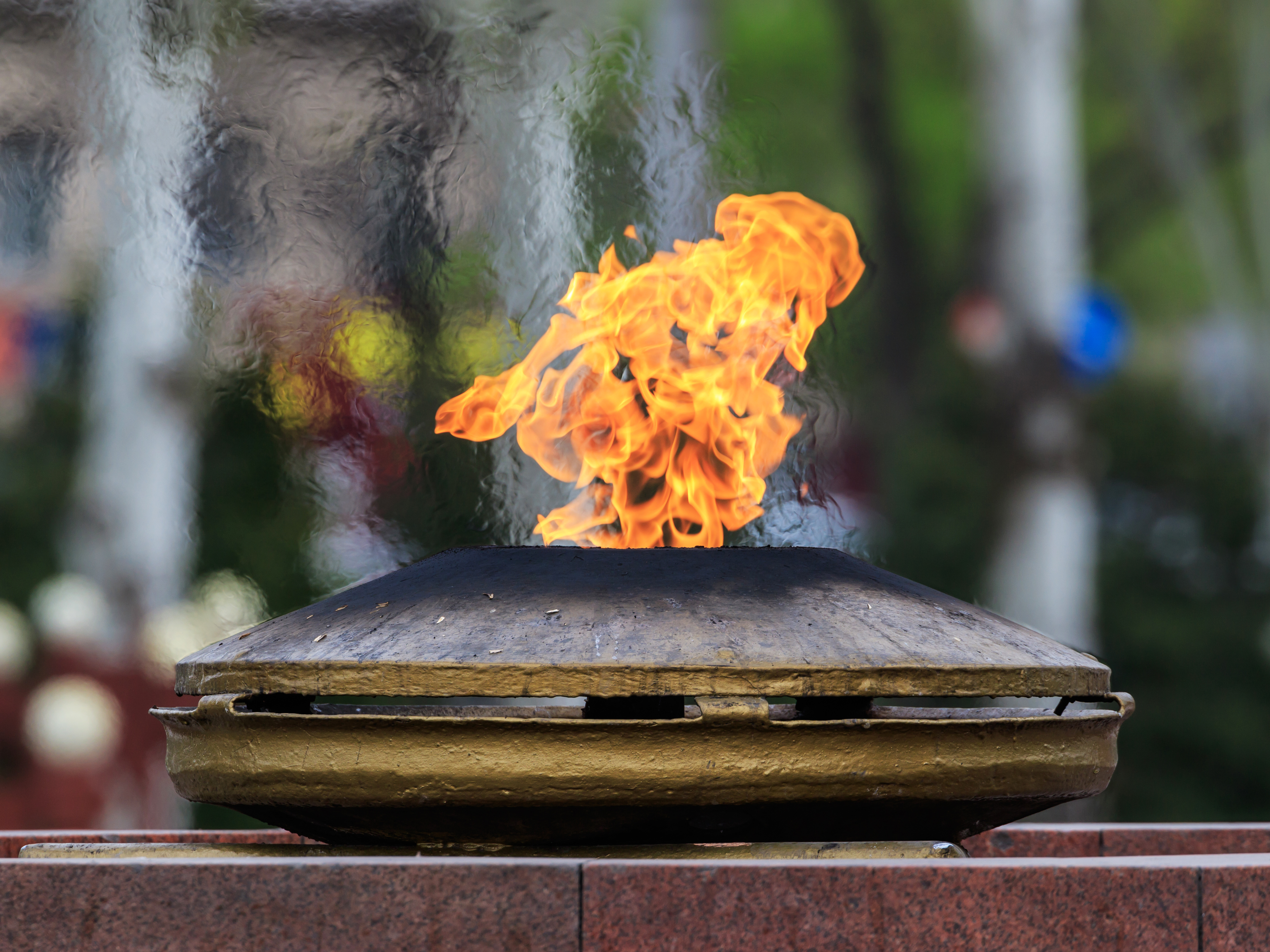
The Eternal Flame in Bishkek.

Victory Square (Kyrgyz: Жеңиш аянты, Russian: Площадь Победы) is a public square in the city of Bishkek, the capital of Kyrgyzstan. It is dedicated to the victory over Nazi Germany. It was created in 1985, on the occasion of the 40th anniversary of the end of the Second World War.

== Victory Monument ==
The central area is filled with a Victory Monument. It was once the site of the main Bishkek Market. The square features a statue of a woman, waiting for her husband to return home from the war. The depicted women is standing under a tynduk in the form of a funeral wreath held by three ribs of red granite representing a yurt.

=== List of notable visitors ===
Many domestic and international dignitaries have paid their respects at the monument.

| Date | Distinguished visitor | Nationality | Note |
|---|---|---|---|
| 7 August 2015 | Gurbanguly Berdimuhamedov | Turkmenistan | visited as President of Turkmenistan |
| 9 May 2016 | Almazbek Atambayev | Kyrgyzstan | visited for the Victory Day celebrations |
| 28 March 2019 | Sooronbay Jeenbekov | Kyrgyzstan | visited as President of Kyrgyzstan |
| 28 March 2019 | Vladimir Putin | Russia | visited as President of Russia |

== Events ==
=== Eternal flame and changing of the guard ===
Another part of the square is the eternal fire. A guard of honour detachment from the National Guard of Kyrgyzstan guards the eternal flame, with the changing of the guard ceremony taking place every hour.

=== Victory Day Parade and celebrations ===
Official Victory Day Parades in honor of Victory Day (9 May) take place on the square. The parades consists of personnel of the Armed Forces of Kyrgyzstan, the Ministry of the Interior and the Emergencies Ministry. In 2020, in honor of the 75th anniversary of the end of the war, Victory Square was decorated with a flower panel, made in the form of a star and the number "75". On 2 May 2020, a ceremony to welcome the Victory Relay by the State Border Guard Service was held on the square.

== Other aspects ==
On the site of Victory Square in the Soviet era. The Naryn restaurant next to it, which appeared here in the mid-1980s, was demolished in the late 2010s.
