= Jill Metzger =

American distance runner and US Air Force officer

Maj. Jill Metzger United States Air Force
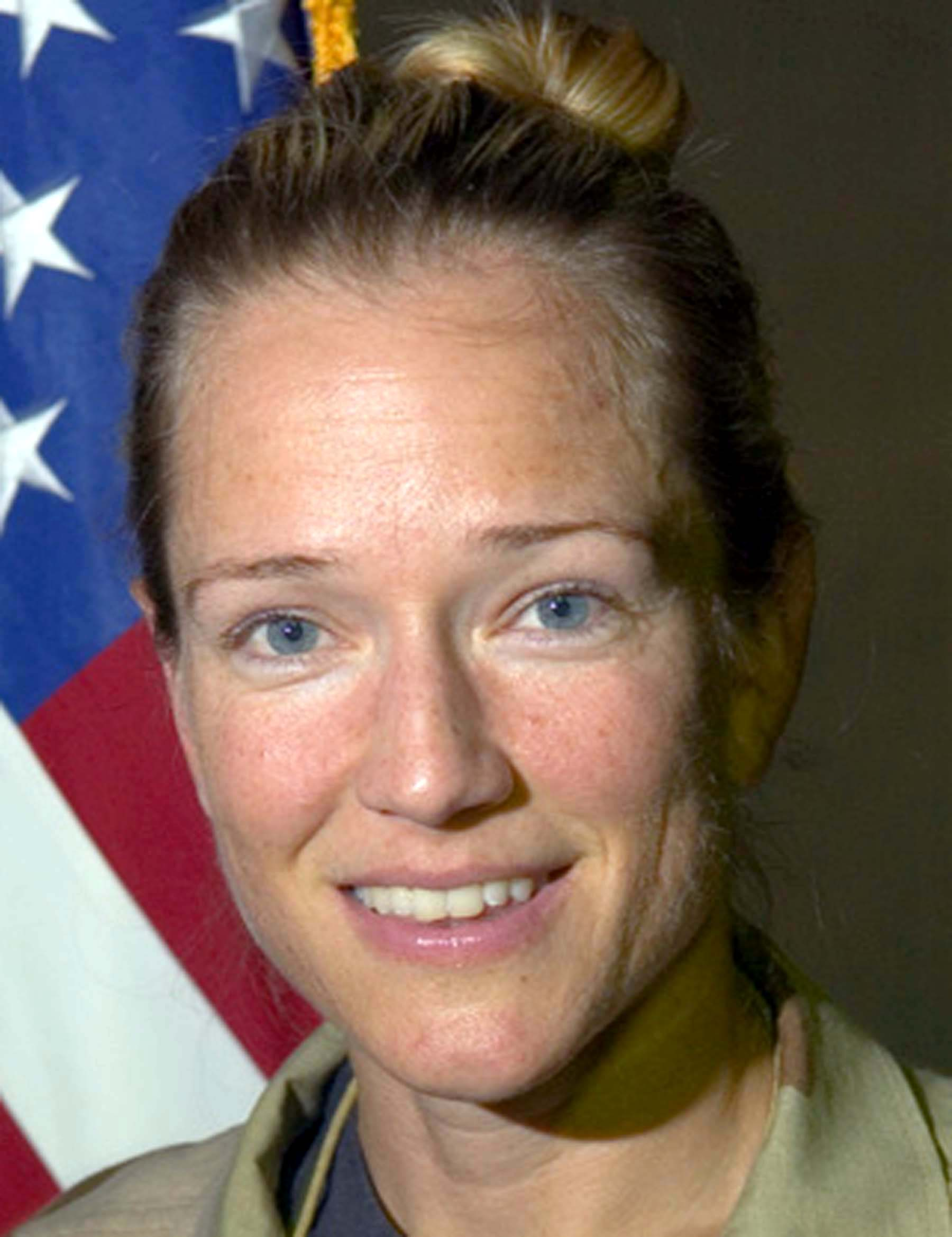
- Air Force Major Jill Metzger
- Born: 1973 (age 52–53)
- Military career
- Allegiance: United States of America
- Branch: United States Air Force
- Rank: Major
- Unit: 376th Air Expeditionary Wing
- Conflicts: Operation Enduring Freedom

Major Jill Metzger is a United States Air Force personnel officer who gained worldwide attention as the result of a three-day disappearance in Bishkek, the capital of Kyrgyzstan.

== Sporting achievements and family ==
She was the women's winner of the United States Air Force Marathon in both 2003 and 2004 and placed 10th in the women's division of the Marine Corps Marathon in 2005. Despite being temporarily retired for medical reasons she came in 2nd place at the 2008 United States Air Force Marathon

She has been married to USAF captain Joshua Mayo since the spring of 2006.

== Kidnapping ==
In September 2006, Metzger was serving with the 376th Air Expeditionary Wing stationed at Manas Air Base, a U.S. military facility that has been located at Manas International Airport, Kyrgyzstan, since 2001, supporting Operation Enduring Freedom's operations in Afghanistan. On September 5, shortly before she was scheduled to return to the United States, she went shopping at the ZUM department store in Bishkek to buy souvenirs for her family. She failed to return to the base as expected and on September 7, The Pentagon reported her as missing (officially, "duty status whereabouts unknown"). She was found three days later in the nearby city of Kant, reporting that she had been abducted from the store, taken via minibus, and escaped from the kidnappers after hitting one of them and fleeing.

The Air Force Office of Special Investigations and other agencies conducted a major investigation, and February 3, 2012, Air Force investigators closed the case, concluding that the evidence was consistent with Metzger's account of being kidnapped. The investigation debunked online smears claiming that Metzger had voluntarily gone AWOL. Shopping center surveillance video showed at least two unidentified persons surveilled Metzger, with one of them following her, and that criminals may have intended to kidnap a different individual who resembled Metzger. The investigation found that Metzger escaped after sharpening a stick into a shank, stabbing one of the captors and locking him in a room, and fleeing to a nearby home, whose residents were able to contact the police. The Federal Bureau of Investigation also completed an investigation into Metzger's disappearance in 2009, but did not make the results public.

== Temporary medical retirement and return to active duty ==
In July 2007, the Air Force Personnel Evaluation Board approved the placement of Metzger (then a member of the 23rd Wing at Moody Air Force Base) on the Temporary Disability Retirement List after she was diagnosed with post-traumatic stress disorder by physicians at Randolph Air Force Base, Texas.

On October 12, 2010, Metzger returned to active duty as the chief of community programs for the Air Force District of Washington at Andrews Air Force Base, Maryland.
