= Kylychbek Aidaraliev =

Kyrgyz general

Colonel Kylychbek Akimovich Aidaraliev (Russian: Кылычбек Акимович Айдаралиев) is a Kyrgyz military leader who is currently the commander the Kyrgyz Air Force. He was born on 5 March 1971 in the village of Myrza-Ake in the Osh Region. In 1993, he graduated from the Stavropol Higher Military School. In 1993, after graduating from the college for further military service, he was sent to military unit 78739 as an instructor pilot of a training helicopter squadron. During his service, he served in the positions of senior instructor pilot, aviation link commander, aviation squadron commander, regiment chief of staff, aviation regiment commander, and deputy aviation commander. In 2012, he graduated from the Academy of Management under the President of the Kyrgyz Republic. On 25 January 2017, Aidaraliev was appointed Commander of the Air Force in a corresponding decree that was signed by President Almazbek Atambayev. In early 2019, Aidaraliev, was severely reprimanded after the crash of Mi-8 MTV helicopter in the mountains of South Inylchek.

He is married with three children. He speaks both the Kyrgyz language and the Russian language.
