= Panther Airborne Brigade =

Kyrgyz specialized unit

- бригады специального назначения «Пантера»
- Active: April 1993 – present
- Country: Kyrgyzstan
- Branch: National Guard
- Type: Spetsnaz
- Role: Special operations
- Size: Battalion (500 personnel)
- Garrison/HQ: Bishkek
- Nickname: Military Unit 714
- Engagements: Batken Conflict

The Panther Airborne Brigade (Russian: бригады специального назначения «Пантера»), also known as Military Unit 714, is a special forces military unit in the National Guard of Kyrgyzstan. Founded in April 1992, it is designed to serve during hostilities such as the destruction of gangs, the localization of terrorist groups, and the elimination of natural disasters.

== History ==
In early 1992, a special forces battalion was created on the territory of the former Military Commissariat of Lenin District, Bishkek. Personnel recruitment took place from April to June. In April 1993, the personnel made the first parachute jumps and today it is the only brigade in the Armed Forces of Kyrgyzstan that is engaged in the airborne training program. It took part in the Batken Conflict of 1999 in southern Kyrgyzstan during which it rebuffed the Islamic Movement of Uzbekistan from the country.

Many personnel of this unit have been trained in the United States, Turkey and China. In addition, the personnel of the brigade have taken part in the United Nations Mission in South Sudan and the United Nations Mission in Liberia.
