= DUSTWUN =

Military status (acronym)

DUSTWUN (abbreviation for duty status—whereabouts unknown) is a transitory casualty status assigned to United States service members who are believed to be involuntarily absent but cannot be located and have not been confirmed dead or captured. Individuals are given the status following the first sign that their absence is involuntary, typically remaining in the status no more than ten days, during which time personnel recovery and fact finding efforts occur which will inform a redesignation.

== Definition ==
"A transitory casualty status used when the responsible commander suspects a member may be a casualty and whose absence is involuntary, but sufficient evidence does not exist to make a definite determination of current status, be it unauthorized absence (UA), missing, or deceased. This applies to members presumed to be lost at sea, or absent ashore due to unknown circumstances."

== Notable uses ==
- On 7 September 2006, US Air Force Lieutenant Jill Metzger received the designation after disappearing while shopping in Bishkek, Kyrgyzstan. She lost the designation when she was found three days later in the nearby city of Kant, where the Air Force Office of Special Investigations concluded she had been taken following an abduction from a store in Bishkek, before attacking and escaping from the kidnappers.
- In 2004, PFC Matthew Maupin was assassinated after his unit was ambushed in Iraq, in a video released by Al-Jazeera. His remains were found in March 2008 and returned to his family.
- In 2009 US Army Private First Class Bowe Bergdahl was assigned the designation and triggered an unsuccessful 45-day manhunt when he abandoned his post in Afghanistan intending to hike 20 miles to the closest ISAF command center but was instead captured by the Taliban.
- On 1 December 2023, seven US Air Force CV-22B Osprey crew members from the 353rd Special Operations Wing were assigned the designation following unsuccessful search and rescue operations when their tiltrotor crashed into the East China Sea approximately one kilometer (0.6 mile) off Yakushima Island, Japan on 29 November 2023. Japanese rescue crews recovered the body of one deceased crew member soon after the crash occurred, but were unable to locate the downed aircraft or the seven remaining crew members. All seven lost the designation when they were declared dead on 4 December.

== See also ==
- Missing in action – MIA
