= Transit Center at Manas =

American airbase in Kyrgyzstan (2001–2014)

Transit Center at Manas (Manas Air Base)
- Sokuluk District, Chüy Region; Near Bishkek in Kyrgyzstan
- A US Air Force C-17A Globemaster III assigned to the 817th Expeditionary Airlift Squadron, Detachment 1 departs the Transit Center Manas during March 2014. The flight signified the end of the airlift mission into Afghanistan from the base.

Site information
- Type: Air Force base
- Owner: Kyrgyzstan Government
- Operator: Kyrgyz Air Force
- Condition: Converted to military logistics command

Location
- Location in Kyrgyzstan
- Coordinates: 43.050278°N 74.469444°E

Site history
- Built: 2001
- In use: 16 December 2001 – 3 June 2014 (12 years, 5 months)
- Fate: Returned to Kyrgyz control
- Events: War in Afghanistan

Airfield information
- Identifiers: IATA: FRU, ICAO: UCFM, WMO: 382200
- Elevation: 637 metres (2,090 ft) AMSL
Runways
Direction	Length and surface
08/26	4,204 metres (13,793 ft) Concrete
- Airfield shared with Manas International Airport. Source: AIP Kyrgyzstan

Transit Center at Manas (formerly Manas Air Base and unofficially Ganci Air Base) is a former U.S. military installation at Manas International Airport, near Bishkek, the capital of Kyrgyzstan. It was primarily operated by the U.S. Air Force. The primary unit at the base was the 376th Air Expeditionary Wing. On 3 June 2014 American troops vacated the base and it was handed over back to the Kyrgyzstan military.

The base was opened in December 2001 to support U.S. military operations in the War in Afghanistan. The base was a transit point for U.S. military personnel coming from and going to Afghanistan. Recreation facilities included internet cafes, wireless internet, pool tables, free video games, and telephone lines via the DSN that allowed coalition forces to call their homes at little or no cost. The base had a large dining facility, a gymnasium, and a chapel. There was also a library where books and magazines were available for active duty airmen. It also hosted forces from several other International Security Assistance Force member states.

Several events, such as the shooting of a local civilian and rumors of fuel dumping, had led to strained relations with some of the local population. Powers such as Russia and China had been pushing for the closure of the base since 2005.

In February 2009, the Kyrgyz Parliament voted to close the base after the two governments failed to agree on a higher rent for the property. American and Kyrgyz officials continued negotiations after the announcement, and on 23 June a tentative agreement was reached. Under the new arrangement, the United States will pay $200 million, three times the previous rent, for continued use of the facilities. Before the handover to the Kyrgyz military, Kyrgyz forces handled security in the areas surrounding the facility, while American forces provided security for the facility, and the site was then called a "transit center" instead of an "air base".

All U.S. forces vacated the base in early June 2014, at which time control of the base was handed over to Kyrgyz authorities. The U.S. lease officially expired in July 2014.

== Name ==
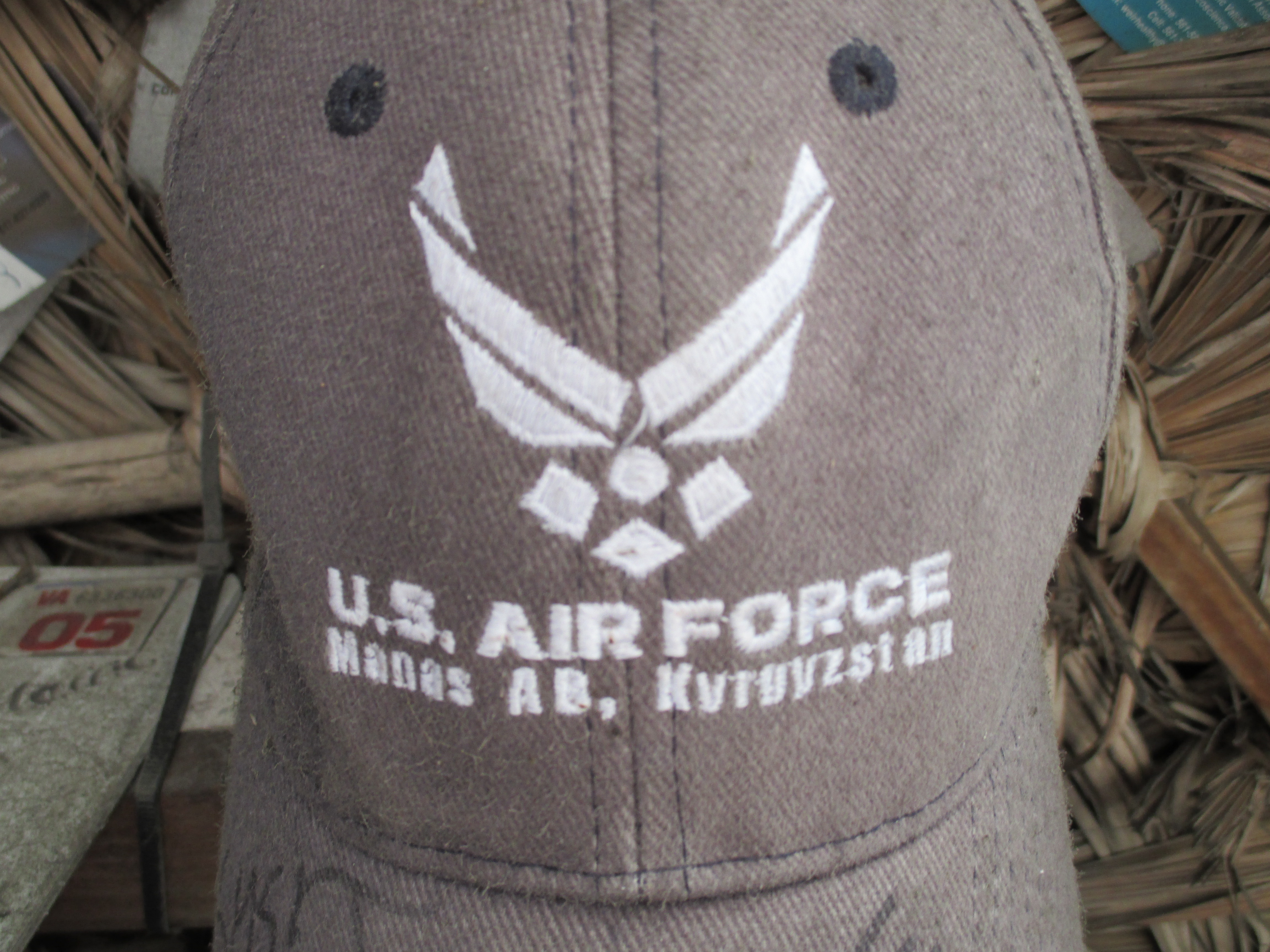
Cap inscribed "U.S. Air Force – Manas Air Base, Kyrgyzstan"

The installation was initially named after New York Fire Department Chief Peter J. Ganci, Jr., who was killed in the September 11 attacks. The all-ranks club/recreation center on base was known as "Pete's Place" in his honor.

Shortly after the U.S. Air Force had used the name "Ganci", it was found that an Air Force Instruction (AFI) dictated that non-U.S. air bases could not bear the name of any U.S. citizens (the former Clark Air Base in the Philippines pre-dated this instruction). Since that time the air base has been officially called Manas Air Base, after the name of Manas International Airport where it is located.

The name "Manas" refers to the Epic of Manas, a world-renowned Kyrgyz epic poem.

The facility was renamed "Transit Center at Manas" following a new agreement between the U.S. and Kyrgyz governments, signed in June 2009. Most English-language sources, however, continue to refer to it as "Manas Air Base".

== History ==
The center opened on 16 December 2001.

=== Operation Enduring Freedom ===
In December 2001, the 86th Contingency Response Group out of Ramstein Air Base in Germany arrived at Manas to open the airfield for military use as part of Operation Enduring Freedom.

U.S. close air support aircraft deployed there included U.S. Air Force F-15Es and U.S. Marine Corps F-18s. In February 2002, a detachment of French Air Force Dassault Mirage 2000D ground attack aircraft and KC-135 air-refueling tankers deployed to Manas in support of ground forces in Afghanistan as part of Operation Enduring Freedom. In March of the same year, the Royal Australian Air Force stationed two B707 air-to-air refueling aircraft at the base. A Norwegian C-130 deployed there in early 2002; it was withdrawn in October 2002 when a tri-national detachment, known as European Participating Airforces (EPAF) of a total of 18 F-16s, 6 from the Danish, 6 from the Dutch and 6 from the Norwegian F-16 multirole aircraft took the place of the Mirages. Support for the new aircraft came in the form of one Netherlands KDC-10 tanker, and several American KC-135s, which remained assigned until June 2014. At the same time, Spain deployed two Superpuma rescue helicopters from its Army Aviation and at least two C-130s. Several of the servicemen from this unit were killed in an air crash on their way home from the base.

=== ISAF support ===
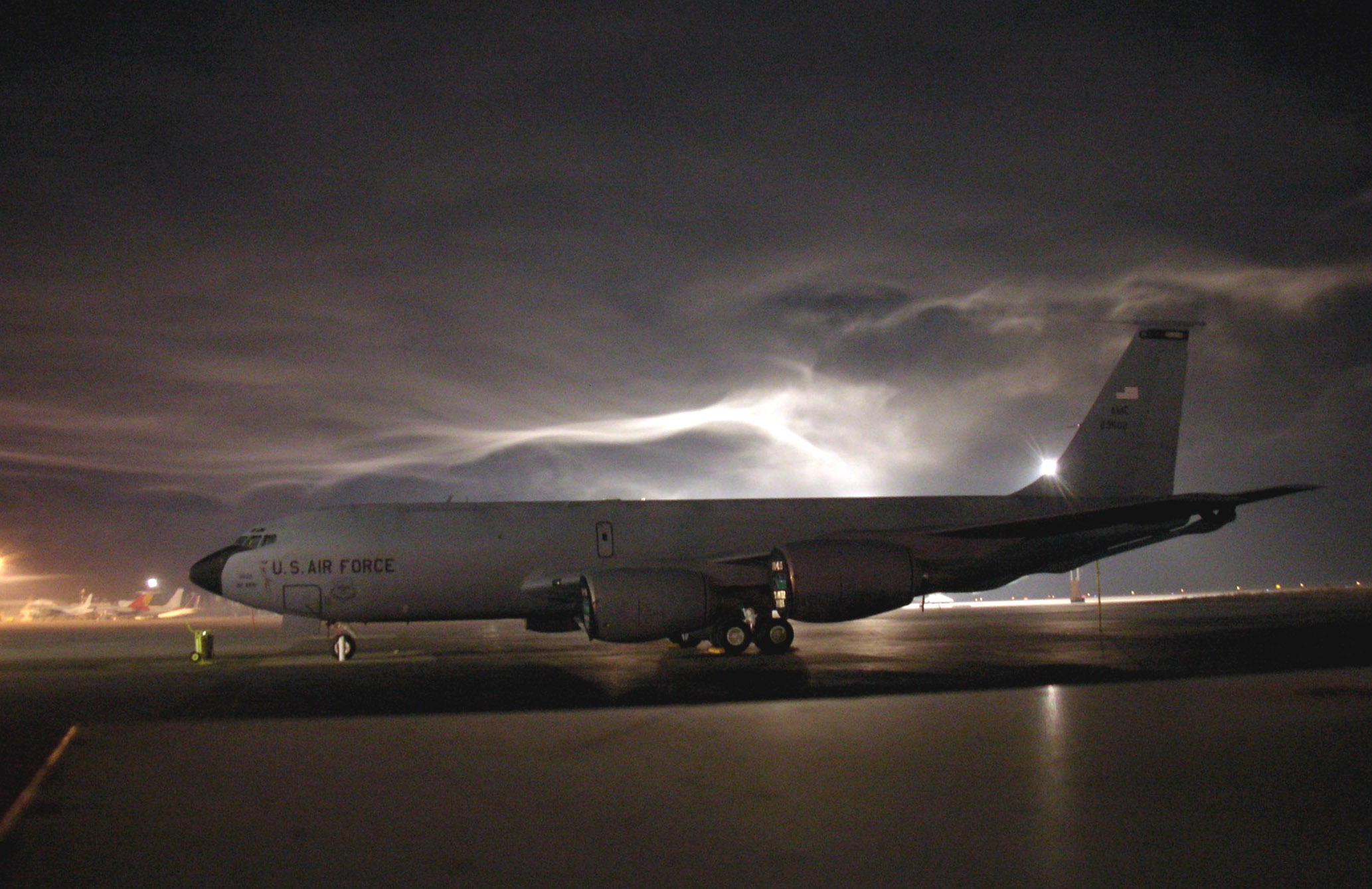
A KC-135 Stratotanker sits on the flightline at Manas Air Base.

In September 2004, the Royal Netherlands Air Force again returned with 5x F-16 fighter/bomber to provide Close Air Support (CAS) for the ISAF mission, which now encompassed both Kabul and Northern Afghanistan. To supplement the small availability of tanker aircraft, a RNLAF KDC-10 was also deployed which flew regularly to supply Dutch F-16s with fuel. At that time, the Spanish Airforce was also giving support with a single C-130. The Dutch, commanded by LtCol Bob "Body" Verkroost, remained until the presidential elections of 9 October 2004 elected Hamid Karzai as president of Afghanistan. The last F-16 mission was flown on 19 November 2004 at which time the F-16s were withdrawn to their homebase of Volkel Airbase in the Netherlands, while the KDC-10 flew the personnel back to Eindhoven Airport. The Dutch returned with F-16s to the Afghan theatre in 2005 but at that time began operating out of Kabul Airport.

=== Tulip Revolution ===
The Tulip Revolution of March 2005 led to the toppling of Kyrgyz president Askar Akayev. However, American and allied personnel did not find themselves disrupted or affected, according to international news reports. One military member even indicated, "It's been business as usual...We did not miss a single flight."

In April 2006, Kyrgyzstan's new president, Kurmanbek Bakiyev, threatened to expel U.S. troops if the United States would not agree by 1 June to pay more for stationing forces in the Central Asian nation. He later withdrew this threat.

On 6 September 2006, U.S. Air Force officer Maj. Jill Metzger went missing after being separated from her group while visiting a shopping center in Bishkek. She was found three days later in the nearby city of Kant. After an Air Force investigation, it was confirmed in February 2012 that Metzger had indeed been kidnapped as she had claimed.

=== December 2006 shooting ===
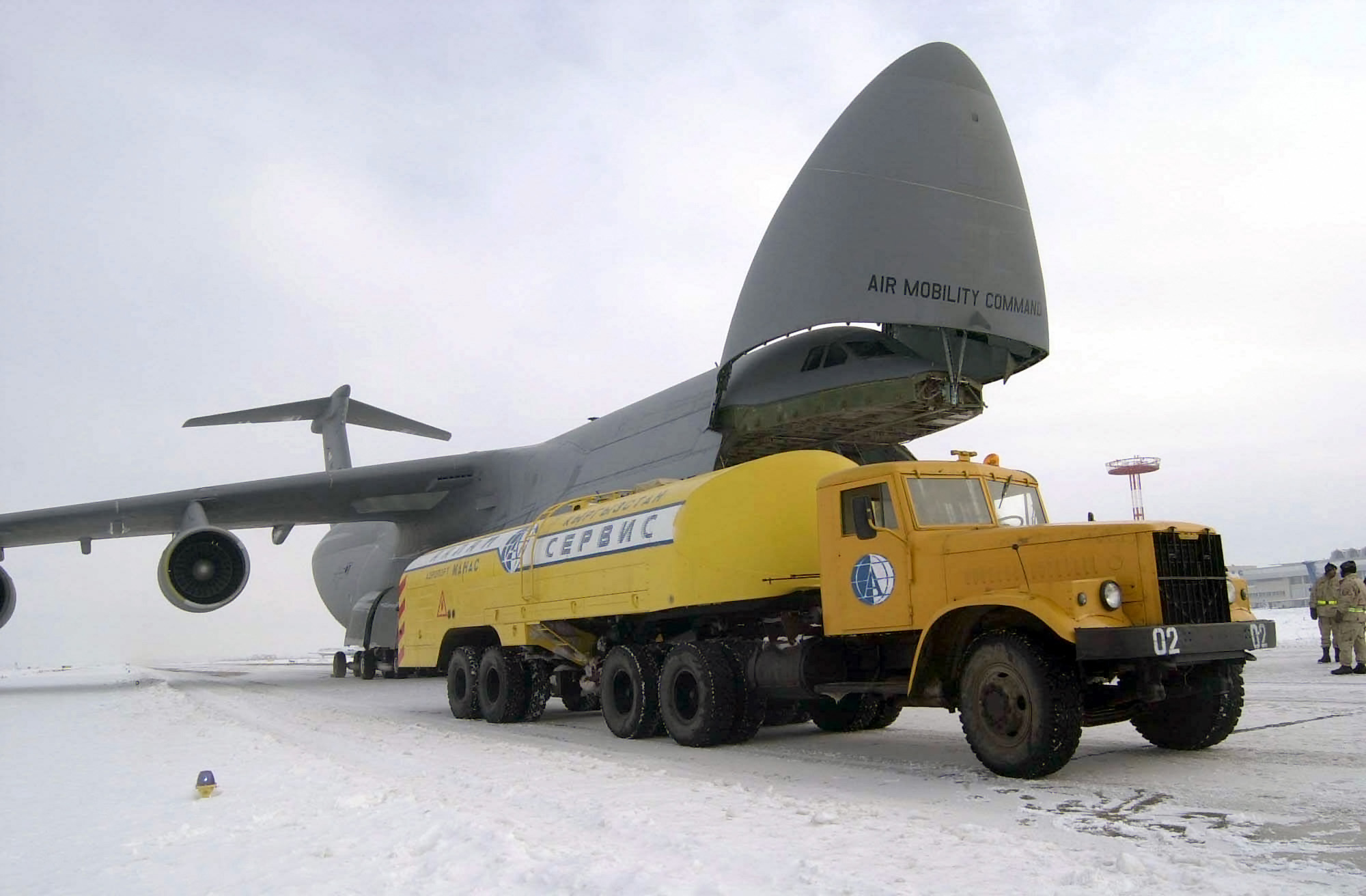
A C-5 Galaxy cargo plane being refuelled by a KrAZ tanker truck at Manas after arriving from Ramstein Air Base.

On 6 December 2006, U.S. serviceman Zachary Hatfield fatally shot Alexander Ivanov, a Kyrgyz civilian, at a truck checkpoint at the base. A statement from the base stated the airman "used deadly force in response to a threat at an entry control checkpoint". Ivanov, a truck driver for Aerocraft Petrol Management, was waiting to finish the security check before proceeding into the U.S.-controlled area. According to a base spokesman, "As the airman approached the tent, the driver physically threatened him with a knife which was discovered at the scene. The airman drew his 9mm weapon and fired in self-defense." Hatfield fired two shots into Ivanov's chest, killing him.

The killing drew widespread condemnation from Kyrgyz authorities and they quickly demanded that Hatfield's immunity from local prosecution be revoked. In the meantime, U.S. authorities agreed to have Hatfield remain in Kyrgyzstan until the matter was resolved. Another issue to come out of the shooting was that of the compensation offered to Ivanov's family. His employer offered the family $50,000 while the U.S. government offered only around $2,000. Galina Skripkina, a lawyer representing Ivanov's widow, described the U.S. offer as "humiliating" and said that if it was not increased the family would take legal action. However, the U.S. embassy stated that this amount was an interim payment and that final compensation would be determined once the investigation into the shooting was concluded.

More detailed data about the hearings on the Hatfield case were published in late December 2010 via the web site Russian Reporter, which issued a series of dispatches from the State Department and U.S. embassies, supposedly originating from the WikiLeaks archive. "Junior Sergeant Hatfield was subject to severe administrative measures against him, which will have long-term effects and negatively affect his career," the dispatch stated though criminal charges against Hatfield never went to a military court. According to the dispatch, the officer authorized to initiate court-martial was General Arthur Lichte, a commander at the airbase, who, "after reviewing the report of the Article 32 investigation and considering the advice of his staff judge advocate...dismissed the charge against SrA Hatfield," the dispatch states. It said that Lichte had ruled for a non-prosecution based "on his own professional and impartial judgment of the facts of the case and the evidence that was available." The paper reported that Lichte was given the power of referral because he was not previously involved in the investigation of the case, nor in the chain of command relating to Hatfield. In the summer of 2009, after dismissing criminal charges against Hatfield, the U.S. military gave Ivanov's widow $250,000.

=== 2009 threat of closure and restructuring ===
Russian news coverage of the vote to close Manas Air Base in the Kyrgish Parliament.

On 3 February 2009, Kyrgyzstan's President Kurmanbek Bakiyev announced that Manas Air Base would soon be closed. A bill calling for the closure of the base and the eviction of U.S. forces was passed by the Kyrgyz parliament by a vote of 78 to one on 19 February 2009. The following day, 20 February, an official eviction notice was delivered to the U.S. Embassy in Bishkek, according to the Kyrgyzstan Ministry of Foreign Affairs.

The news of the base's closure followed the announcement of a new agreement between Russia and Kyrgyzstan in which Kyrgyzstan will receive $2 billion in loans and $150 million in financial aid from Russia. Most observers see the two events as connected, and believe that Russian financial assistance was offered on the condition that U.S. forces were expelled from Kyrgyzstan. As of 2009, the U.S. government provided $150 million in aid annually to Kyrgyzstan. According to General David Petraeus, head of U.S. Central Command, around $63 million of that sum is directly connected to the base. The larger Russian package is viewed by some analysts as an effort to "out-bid" the Americans.

Referring to the closure of Manas Air Base, Pentagon spokesman Geoff S. Morrell directly accused Russia of "attempting to undermine [American] use of that facility". U.S. Secretary of Defense Robert Gates also said that, "The Russians are trying to have it both ways with respect to Afghanistan in terms of Manas. On one hand you're making positive noises about working with us in Afghanistan, and on the other hand you're working against us in terms of that airfield which is clearly important to us." However Russian President Dmitry Medvedev distanced his country from the announcement, saying that it was "within the competence of the Kyrgyz Republic" to decide how the Manas base functioned.

On 23 June 2009 a new deal was reached between the U.S. and Kyrgyz governments. It was ratified by the Kyrgyz parliament two days later, and signed into law by President Bakiyev on 7 July. Under the terms of the new agreement, U.S. payment for use of the facilities will increase from $17.1 million to $60 million. An additional $117 million will be given to the Kyrgyz government, including $36 million for upgrading the airport with additional storage facilities and aircraft parking, $21 million for fighting drug trafficking in the country, and $20 million for economic development.

The facility's official title also was altered under the new agreement. Instead of being referred to as "Manas Air Base", it became the "Transit Center at Manas International Airport". According to a Kyrgyz government spokesman, the facility will officially cease to be an air base in August 2009, after which point its legal status would be altered to a logistic center. Additionally, security around the base will now be handled by Kyrgyz personnel, as opposed to American servicemen.

Several local political observers believe that despite the changes in the new agreement, activities at the base will continue unaltered, and in fact, as of March 2010, operations had continued. In March 2010 the United States transported 50,000 NATO soldiers to Afghanistan via Kyrgyzstan as it represents the quickest and most efficient route. The new agreement does not appear to restrict the kind of materials U.S. forces can move into and out of the base.

According to Bill Gertz, US State Department officials reportedly overheard that China had asked the government of Kyrgyzstan to close the base to U.S. use in return for $3 billion in cash (a sum equal to a tenth of all Chinese foreign aid given from 1950 to 2009). According to Gertz, the Chinese ambassador to Kyrgyzstan subsequently denied to the U.S. ambassador that the covert cash offer had been made.

=== 2010 Kyrgyzstan revolution ===
On 6 April 2010 a second revolution took place. The transit center itself saw few mishaps during the revolution. The 376th Expeditionary Security Forces and augmentees were initially called to combat duty when a Kyrgyz military armored personnel carrier (APC) was taken from a National Guard facility in Bishkek by revolutionaries and was driven to the transit center with the intent to enter the base and stop any fleeing members of the former government. Small arms fire erupted in several locations around the base to include the flight line. The base commander Colonel Holt had all armed combat units and those that were transiting to or from Afghanistan in combat posture to defend the transit center.

=== Closure ===
On 8 November 2011, newly elected President Almazbek Atambayev announced that he would attempt to close the base when its lease ran out in 2014.

In September 2012, Atambayev repeated his view that "Manas should be a civil airport" which "should not be a military base for any country". He reaffirmed his stance that starting from 2014, Manas airport will only be used to transport passengers.

In 2014, American military flights began to fly out of Mihail Kogălniceanu International Airport, Romania instead of Manas.

== Incidents and accidents ==
- On 26 September 2006, a USAF KC-135R, 63-8886, was damaged beyond economical repair when it was struck by a Tupolev Tu-154 of Altyn Air, EX-85718, while stopped on a taxiway after landing at Manas Airbase. The Tu-154 was taking off and its right wing struck the fairing of the KC-135R No. 1 engine. The force of the impact nearly severed the No. 1 engine, but destroyed a portion of the left wing and the resulting fire caused extensive damage to the KC-135. The Tu-154 lost about 6 feet (1.8 m) of its right wingtip, but was able to get airborne and return to the airport for an emergency landing. The tanker crew had been directed to use Taxiway Golf, a taxiway which was not usable for night operations, and the controller failed to note that they reported "holding short" of that taxiway, rather than "clear of" the runway at that point. Both a contractor safety liaison employed by the U.S. Air Force and the air traffic control tower personnel failed to note that the KC-135 was not clear of the runway prior to clearing the Tu-154 for takeoff. The crew of the KC-135 evacuated the aircraft without serious injuries.
- On 3 May 2013, a Fairchild AFB, WA air crew flying a McConnell AFB, KS (USAF) KC-135R, 63-8877, crashed about 8 minutes after taking off from Manas Airbase in Kyrgyzstan, killing three crew members. The aircraft was at cruise altitude about 200 km west of Bishkek when it lost altitude and crashed in a mountainous area near the village of Chorgolu, close to the border between Kyrgyzstan and Kazakhstan. Videotape evidence seems to indicate that the fuselage was in flames as it descended from the clouds overhead, although the tail and some wreckage (left wing, vertical stabilizer, one engine, boom and boom drogue adapter) were not blackened by fire and landed some distance away. This may indicate an inflight explosion or structural failure, possibly related to thunderstorms in the area. Ultimately, the mishap board determined that a rudder system malfunction contributed to development of oscillatory instability, known as "Dutch roll." The aircrew did not adequately diagnose the problem and, by using rudder to maintain course, contributed to structural failure of the aircraft. Although one of the last -135 aircraft built, this airframe was 48 years and 10 months old at the time of its loss.

== See also ==
- Kant Air Base
- Karshi-Khanabad Air Base
- New Great Game
