= Kyrgyz Air Force =

Aerial warfare branch of the armed forces of the Republic of Kyrgyzstan

- Кыргыз Республикасы Аскер-аба күчтөрү
- Kyrgyz Air Force roundel
- Founded: 27 July 1992; 32 years ago
- Country: Kyrgyzstan
- Type: Air force
- Role: Aerial warfare
- Part of: Kyrgyz Armed Forces
- Headquarters: Bishkek
- Anniversaries: 18 August (Aviation Day)
- Engagements: 1999 Batken Conflict; 2022 Isfara missile attacks

Commanders
- Commander-in-Chief: President Sadyr Japarov
- Chief of the Air Force: Colonel Kylychbek Aidaraliev

Insignia
- Roundel

- Fin flash

Aircraft flown
- Helicopter: Mil Mi-8; Mil Mi-24
- Transport: Antonov An-26

The Kyrgyz Air Force (Kyrgyz: Кыргыз Республикасы Аскер-аба күчтөрү) is the official air force of the Armed Forces of the Kyrgyz Republic. Its current commander is Colonel Kylychbek Aidaraliev. The official holiday of the air forces is Aviation Day on August 18.

== History ==
The military aviation in the Kyrgyz SSR dates back to December 1991. Kyrgyzstan's air arm was inherited from the central Soviet Air Force training school (now the Military Institute of the Armed Forces of the Kyrgyz Republic). This presented the nation a fleet with several L-39s, some dismantled MiG-21s, Mi-8s and Mi-24s. However, only a few L-39s and some helicopters are capable of flight. All aircraft are reportedly based at Kant, alongside the Russian 999th Air Base. Because of expense and military doctrine, Kyrgyzstan has not developed its air capability; a large number of the MiG-21 interceptors that it borrowed from Russia were returned in 1993, although a number of former Soviet air bases remain available. In 1996, about 100 decommissioned MiG-21s remained in Kyrgyzstan, along with ninety-six L-39 trainers and sixty-five helicopters. The air defence forces have received aid from Russia, which has sent military advisory units to establish a defence system. The Russians also help patrol Kyrgyz airspace as part of the Joint CIS Air Defence System Presently Kyrgyzstan has twenty-six SA-2 and SA-3 surface-to-air missiles in its air defence arsenal. In 2002, the Kyrgyz government allowed the United States to use Manas air base for support operations in the War on terror. This agreement lasted till June 2014.

The Air Defense Forces were created by the decree of President Kurmanbek Bakiyev on July 27, 2006. On its 11th anniversary in 2017, it was presented with its battle banner. In August 2019, the 60th anniversary of military aviation in the nation was celebrated by the air force, holding an air parade in the Chüy Region.

== Structure ==
- Air Force HQ (Bishkek)
- 5th Guards Independent Anti-Aircraft Missile Brigade (Bishkek)
- 11th Air Defense Brigade (Osh)
- 44th Independent Radio Engineering Battalion (Grigor'yevka)
- Frunze-1 Air Base (Bishkek)
- Central Command Post of the Northern Group of Forces (Bishkek)

== Aircraft ==
=== Current inventory ===
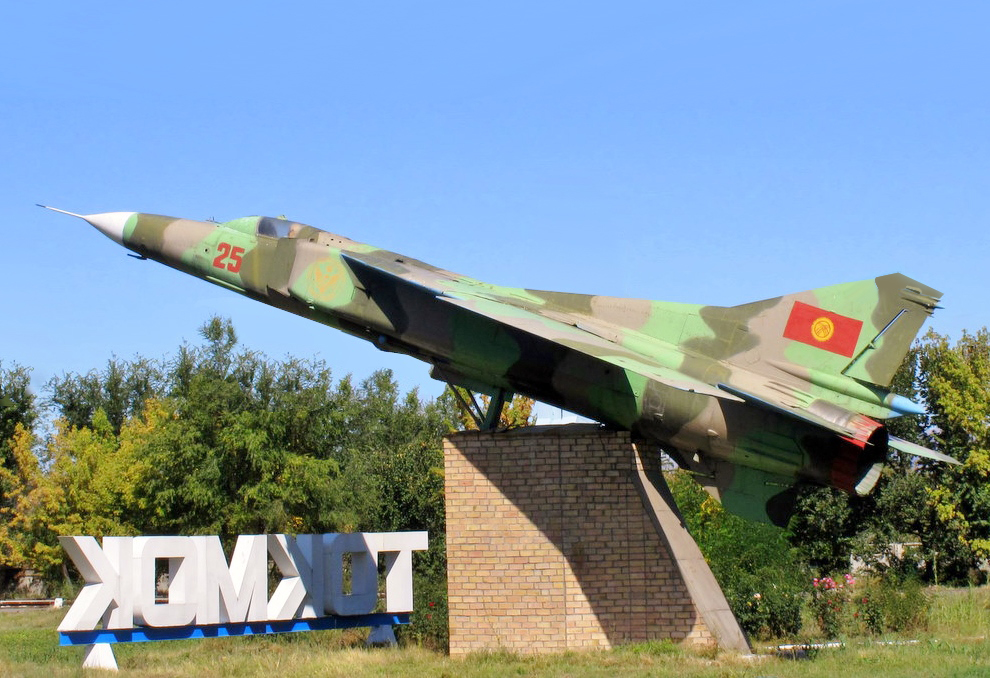
A MiG-23 on display in Tokmok

Aircraft	Origin	Type	Variant	In service	Notes
Transport
Antonov An-26	Russia	Transport		2	
Helicopters
Mil Mi-8	Soviet Union	Utility	Mi-8MT	3	
Mil Mi-17	Soviet Union	Utility	Mi-17V-5	2	
Mil Mi-24	Russia	Attack	Mi-24V	2	
UAV
Orlan-10	Russia	Surveillance			On order

=== Air defence ===
System	Origin	Type	Variant	Quantity	Notes
S-75 Dvina	Soviet Union	Medium-range surface-to-air missile	S-75M3	6	
S-125 Neva/Pechora	Soviet Union	Short-range surface-to-air missile	S-125M1	8	

=== Retired ===
Previous aircraft operated by the Air Force consisted of the L-39 Albatros, MiG-21, MiG-23, MiG-29, An-12, An-2 and the Tupolev Tu-134
