= Jangy-Aryk, Kara-Suu =

Jangy-Aryk Kyrgyz: Жаңы-Арык
- Location within Kyrgyzstan
- Coordinates: 40°39′0″N 73°6′30″E
- Country: Kyrgyzstan
- Region: Osh Region
- District: Kara-Suu District
- Elevation: 950 m (3,120 ft)

Population (2021)
  - Total: 6,693
- Time zone: UTC+6

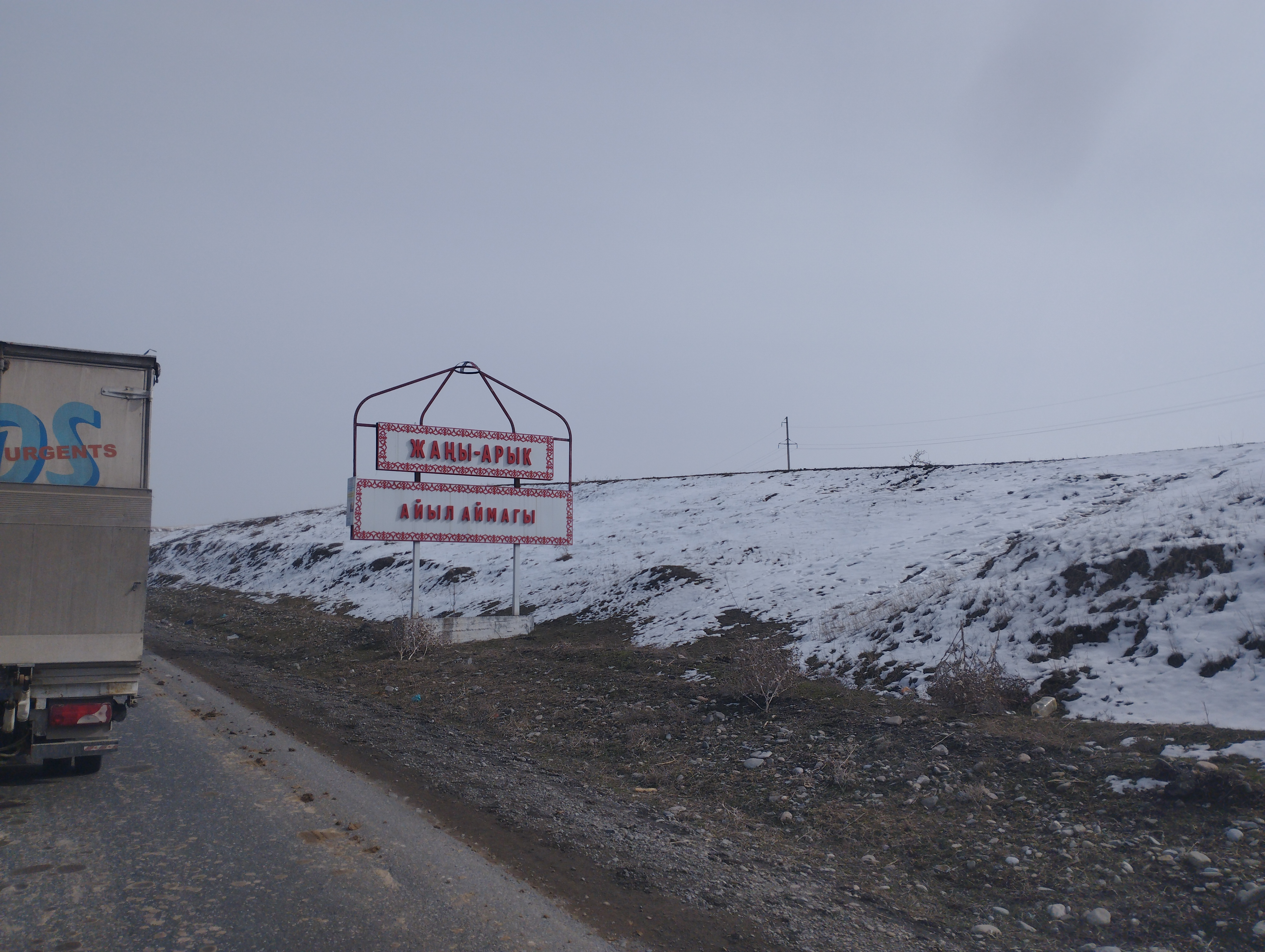
Jangy-Aryk village area

Jangy-Aryk (Kyrgyz: Жаңы-Арык) is a village in the Osh Region of Kyrgyzstan. It is part of the Kara-Suu District. Its population was 6,693 in 2021.

== Population ==
Historical population
Year	Pop.	±% p.a.
2009	5,986	—
2021	6,693	+0.93%
Note: resident population; Sources:
