= Armed Forces of the Kyrgyz Republic =

Military of Kyrgyzstan

- Кыргыз Республикасынын Куралдуу Күчтөрү; Вооружённые силы Кыргызской Республики
- Emblem of the Kyrgyz Armed Forces

- Ensign of Kyrgyz Armed Forces
- Motto: Милдет, Намыс, Ата-Мекен; Mildet, Namys, Ata-Meken (Duty, Honor, and Fatherland)
- Founded: 29 May 1992
- Service branches: Service branches ∟ Ground Forces ∟ Air Force ∟ National Guard; Independent formations ∟ Frontier Force ∟ Internal Troops
- Headquarters: Ministry of Defence, Bishkek
- Website: mil.gov.kg

Leadership
- Commander in Chief: Sadyr Japarov
- Minister of Defense: Major General Ruslan Mukambetov
- Chief of the General Staff: Major General Tariel Otonbaev

Personnel
- Military age: 18
- Conscription: 12 months (high school graduates); 9 months (university graduates)
- Active personnel: 23,000 (2022 est.)

Expenditure
- Budget: $600,000,000 (2022 est)

Industry
- Foreign suppliers: Russia; China; Kazakhstan; Uzbekistan; United States; Pakistan; India; United Kingdom; Turkey

Related articles
- History: Tajikistani Civil War; Batken Conflict; War on terror (2001); Tulip Revolution; War in Afghanistan (2005–2013); 2010 Kyrgyz Revolution; 2010 South Kyrgyzstan ethnic clashes; 2013 Kyrgyzstan protests; Kyrgyz Revolution of 2020; 2021 Kyrgyzstan–Tajikistan clashes; 2022 Kazakh unrest; 2022 Kyrgyzstan–Tajikistan clashes; 2022 Isfara missile attacks; Kyrgyz peacekeeping forces participated: Sierra Leone: UNMSL; Liberia: UNML; Kosovo: UNIAMK; Sudan: UNMS; East Timor: UNTAET; /: UNMEaE; /: UNMCARC
- Ranks: Military ranks of Kyrgyzstan

The Armed Forces of the Kyrgyz Republic (Note: Kyrgyz: Кыргыз Республикасынын Куралдуу Күчтөрү, romanized: Kyrgyz Respublikasynyn Kuralduu Küchtörü; Russian: Вооружённые силы Кыргызской Республики, romanized: Vooružjonnyje sily Kyrgyzskoj Reapubliki) is the national military of Kyrgyzstan. It was originally formed from the former Soviet forces of the Turkestan Military District stationed in newly independent Kyrgyzstan. It consists of the Ground Forces, the Air Force and the National Guard. Affiliated security forces to the armed forces included the Internal Troops, the State Committee for National Security and the Border Troops.

== History ==
=== Early years ===
The Armed Forces were formed on 29 May 1992 when President of the Kyrgyz SSR Askar Akayev signed a decree which effectively consolidated all the formations and units of the Soviet Army deployed in the territory of the new republic under the jurisdiction of Bishkek and not Moscow. Until 1988, these troops were part of the Central Asian Military District. 29 May is today celebrated as the Day of the Armed Forces. In 1993, the State Defense Committee was renamed to the Ministry of Defense on the basis of the headquarters of the 17th Army Corps. In 1998, the 1st Koy Tash, 2nd Osh, and 3rd Balykchinsk Infantry Brigades were created on the basis of the 8th Guards Motor Rifle Division. In August 1999, the Batken Conflict occurred in southwestern Kyrgyzstan, during which militants of the Islamic Movement of Uzbekistan (IMU) made incursions of into Uzbek and Kyrgyz territory from their camps in Tajikistan.

=== 21st century ===
In 2006, the Air Force and Air Defense Forces were combined to form the Kyrgyz Air Force. The same year, the term of service was reduced from 18 to 12 months (1 year). In February 2014, the Armed Forces General Staff was expanded to have complete control over the military apparatus, with the ministry of defense becoming a state defense committee which plays a smaller and more administrative role. Despite this arrangement, many former military/security officials such as Taalaibek Omuraliev and Adyl Kurbanov were in favor of returning the military to its former organization.

Following the inauguration of President Sadyr Japarov in early February 2021, the Ministry of Defense was reestablished following a 7-year hiatus. After signing the new Constitution of Kyrgyzstan in May 2021, President Japarov called for reform in the military, particularly the need to "organize the army according to the principle of special units, fully trained and technologically equipped to conduct military operations in mountainous conditions." He also at the same time called for the creation of "people’s guards", which according to him, will provide mobilization readiness amongst the population living in border areas.

== Army ==
For much of the Soviet period, since 1967, the 8th Guards 'Panfilov' Motor Rifle Division was the main military force in the country. In 1967 the division had been moved to Bishkek from the Baltic Military District, where it had previously been based. It was only disbanded in January 2003. However, in 2011 reports said the division had been reformed with its headquarters in Tokmak. The Army of Kyrgyzstan includes the 1st Motor Rifle Brigade (Mountain) at Osh, a brigade at Koy-Tash, in the Bishkek area, the 25th Special Forces Brigade, independent battalions at Karakol and Naryn, a brigade at Balykchi, and other units. Two Groups of Forces, the Southern, and more recently the Northern, have been active during Kyrgyzstan's history. In 2004, the Northern Group of Forces was reported as consisting of the Balykchynsky brigade, the brigade deployed in suburb of Bishkek, separate battalions in Karakol and Naryn, and other army units.

The Army controls the Combat Training Center and Training Center "Ala-Too".

== Air Force ==
Kyrgyzstan's air arm was inherited from the central Soviet air force training school. This presented the nation a fleet of nearly 70 L-39s, dismantled MiG-21's and several Mi-8's and Mi-24's. However, only a few L-39s and the helicopters are capable of flight. All Kyrgyz military aircraft are reportedly based at Kant, alongside the Russian 999th Air Base. Because of expense and military doctrine, Kyrgyzstan has not developed its air capability; a large number of the MiG-21 interceptors that it borrowed from Russia were returned in 1993, although a number of former Soviet air bases remain available. In 1996 about 100 decommissioned MiG-21s remained in Kyrgyzstan, as of 2017 only 29 MiG-21s are in working order, in service along with ninety-six L-39 trainers and sixty-five helicopters. The air defense forces have received aid from Russia, which has sent military advisory units to establish a defense system. The Russians also help patrol Kyrgyz airspace as part of the Joint CIS Air Defence System. Presently Kyrgyzstan has twenty-six SA-2 and SA-3 surface-to-air missiles in its air defense arsenal. In 2002 the Kyrgyzstan government allowed the United States to use Manas air base for support operations in the war on terror. This agreement lasted until June 2014.

== National Guard ==
The National Guard of Kyrgyzstan was founded on December 6, 1991, and took their first oath July 20 the following year. In 2014, the Internal Troops were absorbed into the National Guard as a result of the ongoing military reforms. This would remain this way until September 2018 when they were separated once again.

== Equipment ==
Military equipment of the Armed Forces of the Kyrgyz Republic
Name	Image	Origin	In service	Notes
Tanks
T-72 "Ural" Early		USSR	N/A	
T-72 "Ural" Late		USSR	N/A	
T-72A		USSR	N/A	
Armoured fighting vehicles
BRDM-2		USSR	N/A	
BRDM-2MS		Russia	N/A	
MT-LB		USSR; Kyrgyzstan	N/A	(Some with ZU-23 AA Guns).
Infantry fighting vehicles
BMP-1		USSR	N/A	
BMP-1(P)		USSR	N/A	
BMP-1D		USSR	N/A	
BMP-2 Obr. 1984		USSR	N/A	
BMP-2D		USSR	N/A	
BMD-1		USSR	N/A	
Armoured personnel carriers
BTR-70		USSR	N/A	
BTR-70M		Russia	N/A	
BTR-80		USSR	N/A	
Infantry mobility vehicles
GAZ Tigr-M		Russia	N/A	
CS/VN3 Dajiang		China	N/A	
Tiger		China	N/A	
EQ2050F		China	N/A	
Technicals
Toyota Land Cruiser		United Arab Emirates	N/A	
Ford Ranger		United States	N/A	
Towed artillery
100mm BS-3		USSR	N/A	(Used for avalanche control).
100mm KS-19		USSR	N/A	(Used for avalanche control).
122mm D-30		USSR	N/A	
152mm 2A65 Msta-B		USSR	N/A	
Self-propelled artillery
120mm 2S9 Nona		USSR	N/A	
122mm 2S1 Gvozdika		USSR	N/A	
Multiple rocket launchers
122mm BM-21 Grad		USSR	N/A	
122mm 9P138 Grad-1		USSR	N/A	
Towed anti-aircraft guns
23mm ZU-23		USSR	N/A	
Self-propelled anti-aircraft guns
ZSU-23-4 'Shilka'		USSR	N/A	
Static surface-to-air missile systems
S-75		USSR	N/A	(One site protecting the capital Bishkek).
S-125		USSR	N/A	(Two sites protecting the capital Bishkek).
Self-propelled surface-to-air missile systems
9K35 Strela-10		USSR	N/A	
Radars
P-15 'Flat Face A'		USSR	N/A	
P-18 'Spoon Rest D'		USSR	N/A	
Smart Hunter		China	N/A	(For use in conjunction with MANPADS).
SNR-75 'Fan Song'		USSR	N/A	(For S-75).
SNR-125 'Low Blow'		USSR	N/A	(For S-125).
Reconnaissance unmanned aerial vehicles
Orlan-10E		Russia	N/A	(Not yet seen).
WJ-100		China	N/A	
Unmanned combat aerial vehicles
Bayraktar Akıncı		Turkey	N/A	
Bayraktar TB2		Turkey	N/A	(Armed with four MAM-C or MAM-L PGMs).
TAI Aksungur		Turkey	2	
Saara-02		Kyrgyzstan	N/A	(Armed with two Bask-80 PGMs).

== Foreign military presence and international cooperation ==
In terms of foreign presence, the U.S.-led Operation Enduring Freedom coalition used the Manas Air Base (Bishkek's international airport) until June 2014. In response, Russia set up the 999th Air Base at Kant to counter the American military presence in the former Soviet state. Moscow is believed to have promised Bishkek $1.1 billion for modernizing its army. Agreements to this effect were reached during the visits to Bishkek by Deputy Prime Minister Igor Shuvalov in August and President Vladimir Putin in September 2012. As of fall 2023, Russia supplies various military equipment and also begins to form a joint air defense system. Since May 1992, Kyrgyzstan has been a member of the Collective Security Treaty Organization. In addition, its leaders work within the framework of the Council of Ministers of Defense of the CIS. Kyrgyzstan hosted the Second CIS Military Sports Games in 2017 in Balykchy. The games included various competition in shooting, fighting, etc. On 16 July 2018, the opening of the Kyrgyz-Indian Mountain Training Center took place in Balykchy at the Edelweiss Training Center, built with funds allocated by the Government of India.

The personnel of the armed forces also take part in UN peacekeeping missions. Currently, Kyrgyz forces are serving in Sierra Leone, Liberia, Sudan, East Timor, Ethiopia and Kosovo.

== Personnel ==
=== Military education ===
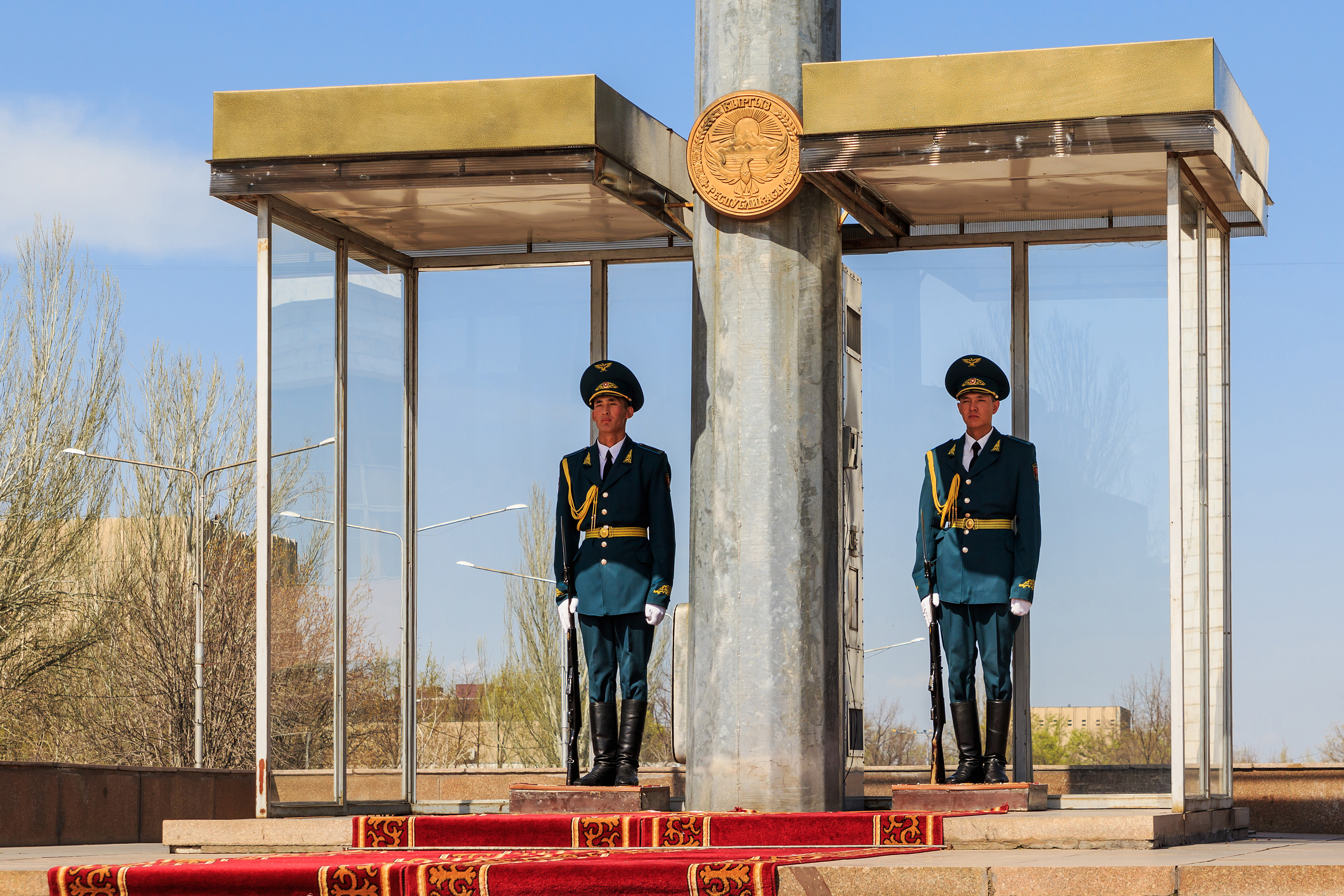
Military guard of honor near a monument in Bishkek's main square

The main military educational institutions include:

- Military Institute of the Armed Forces of the Kyrgyz Republic
- MVD Academy of Kyrgyzstan

Kyrgyzstan has an agreement with the Russian Federation, according to which Kyrgyz soldiers are trained in military academies in Russia. The training of officers is carried out in the military educational institutions of the Republic of Kazakhstan, the Republic of Azerbaijan, the Republic of Turkey and the People's Republic of China.

==== Training centers ====
The Center for Advanced Training of Officers and NCOs of the Defense Ministry was opened in early 2007. It was designed to offer one-month professional training courses. In 2005, the NCO Training School of the Combined Arms Training Center of the Armed Forces was opened at the base of the 2nd Independent Motorized Rifle Brigade. In 2013, the border guard opened classes at more than 100 secondary schools. The Edelweiss Training Center operates in the Issyk-Kul Region.

==== High schools ====
The Kyrgyz State National Military Lyceum and MVD High School are secondary schools that trains middle-tier commanders in the armed forces.

==== Kyrgyz State Medical Academy Faculty ====
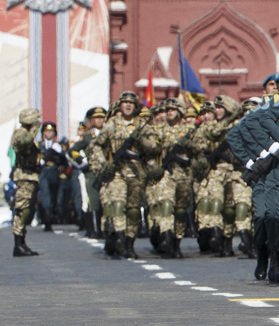
Cadets of the institute during a victory day parade in central Moscow in 2020.

The Military Faculty of Kyrgyz State Medical Academy was created in the beginning of the Second World War, specifically in October 1941 when there was a shortage of medical personnel in the medical service. Originally it was the Sanitary Department of Defence, and in 1942 it was renamed to the Department of Military and Health Training, and has since 1944 been known as the Department of Military Medical Training. It currently engages in the military training of students of medical, pediatric, dental, sanitary and pharmaceutical departments of the armed forces.

=== Conscription ===
Kyrgyz Armed Forces have inherited conscription from the Armed Forces of USSR. The length of conscription was reduced to 12 months from initial 18 in 2006. Today, Kyrgyz Armed Forces employ a policy of reducing the service period for university graduates to 9 months. Alternative service exists, however, it is only offered to conscripts who belong to certain religious groups.

== Affiliated security forces ==
- State Committee for National Security
- Ministry of the Interior
- Kyrgyz Frontier Force
